= 2016–17 FC Midtjylland season =

FC Midtjylland
2016–17 season
- Chairman: Rasmus Ankersen
- Head Coach: Jess Thorup
- Ground: MCH Arena
- Danish Superliga: 4th
- Danish Cup: Semi-final
- UEFA Europa League: Play-off round
- Top goalscorer: League: Paul Onuachu (19); All: Paul Onuachu (25)
- Highest home attendance: League: 10,624
- Lowest home attendance: League: 4,690
- Average home league attendance: League: 7,296
Home colours	Away colours	Third colours

The 2016–17 season was FC Midtjylland's 17th consecutive season in the Danish Superliga. Midtjylland participated in the Europa League this season, after finishing 3rd in the 2015–16 Danish Superliga.

For the 2nd consecutive season, Midtjylland U-19 competed in the UEFA Youth League.

== Squad ==
As of 1 June 2017

No.	Name	Nationality	Position	Date of birth (age)	Previous club
Goalkeepers
16	Johan Dahlin	(Sweden)	GK	8 September 1986 (aged 30)	(Turkey) Gençlerbirliği
30	Andreas Raahauge	(Denmark)	GK	29 June 1997 (aged 19)	Academy
31	Mikkel Andersen	(Denmark)	GK	17 December 1988 (aged 28)	(England) Reading
Defenders
2	Kian Hansen	(Denmark)	DF	3 March 1989 (aged 28)	(France) FC Nantes
5	Marc Dal Hende	(Denmark)	DF	6 November 1990 (aged 26)	(Denmark) SønderjyskE
6	Markus Halsti	(Finland)	DF	19 March 1984 (aged 33)	(United States) D.C. United
18	Kristian Riis	(Denmark)	DF	17 February 1997 (aged 20)	Academy
20	Rasmus Nicolaisen	(Denmark)	DF	16 March 1997 (aged 20)	Academy
28	André Rømer	(Denmark)	DF	18 July 1993 (aged 23)	Academy
40	Andreas Poulsen	(Denmark)	DF	13 October 1999 (aged 17)	Academy
43	Rasmus Nissen	(Denmark)	DF	11 July 1997 (aged 19)	Academy
70	Filip Novák	(Czech Republic)	DF	26 June 1990 (aged 26)	(Czech Republic) Jablonec
Midfielders
3	Tim Sparv	(Finland)	MF	20 February 1987 (aged 30)	(Germany) Greuther Fürth
7	Jakob Poulsen	(Denmark)	MF	7 July 1983 (aged 33)	(France) AS Monaco
8	Rafael van der Vaart	(Netherlands)	MF	11 February 1983 (aged 34)	(Spain) Betis
9	Janus Drachmann	(Denmark)	MF	11 May 1988 (aged 29)	(Denmark) SønderjyskE
11	Jonas Borring	(Denmark)	MF	4 January 1985 (aged 32)	(Denmark) Brøndby IF
14	Simon Kroon	(Sweden)	MF	16 June 1993 (aged 23)	(Denmark) SønderjyskE
21	Kaan Kairinen	(Finland)	MF	22 December 1998 (aged 18)	(Finland) Inter Turku
22	Mikkel Duelund	(Denmark)	MF	29 June 1997 (aged 19)	Academy
34	Mikael Anderson	(Denmark)	MF	1 July 1998 (aged 18)	Academy
35	Gloire Rutikanga	(Democratic Republic of the Congo)	MF	4 February 1997 (aged 20)	Academy
36	Rilwan Hassan	(Nigeria)	MF	9 February 1991 (aged 26)	Academy
42	Babajide David	(Nigeria)	MF	13 January 1996 (aged 21)	Academy
88	Gustav Wikheim	(Norway)	MF	18 March 1993 (aged 24)	Loan from (Belgium) Gent
Forwards
24	Mads Døhr Thychosen	(Denmark)	FW	27 June 1997 (aged 19)	(Denmark) Vejle BK
33	Paul Onuachu	(Nigeria)	FW	28 May 1994 (aged 23)	Academy
77	Bruninho	(Brazil)	FW	29 September 1989 (aged 27)	Loan from (China) Guangzhou R&F

=== Out on loan ===
Note: Flags indicate national team as defined under FIFA eligibility rules; some limited exceptions apply. Players may hold more than one non-FIFA nationality.

No.	Pos.	Nation	Player
—	DF	DEN	Alexander Munksgaard (at Lyngby BK until 30 June 2017)
—	MF	AUS	Awer Mabil (at Esbjerg fB until 30 June 2017)
—	MF	DEN	Jonas Gemmer (at AC Horsens until 30 June 2017)

No.	Pos.	Nation	Player
—	MF	DEN	Marco Larsen (at HB Køge until 30 June 2017)
—	FW	AUT	Martin Pušić (at Sparta Rotterdam until 30 June 2017)

== Transfers ==
=== Summer ===
In: Note: Flags indicate national team as defined under FIFA eligibility rules; some limited exceptions apply. Players may hold more than one non-FIFA nationality.

No.	Pos.	Nation	Player
6	DF	FIN	Markus Halsti
8	MF	NED	Rafael van der Vaart (from (Spain) Real Betis)
11	MF	DEN	Jonas Borring (from (Denmark) Brøndby IF)
44	FW	SWE	Zackarias Faour (loan from (England) Manchester City)
77	FW	BRA	Bruninho (loan from (China) Guangzhou R&F)
88	MF	NOR	Gustav Wikheim (loan from (Belgium) Gent)

Out: Note: Flags indicate national team as defined under FIFA eligibility rules; some limited exceptions apply. Players may hold more than one non-FIFA nationality.

No.	Pos.	Nation	Player
4	DF	BUL	Nikolay Bodurov (loan return to (England) Fulham)
6	DF	DEN	Jim Larsen (end of contract)
8	MF	SWE	Petter Andersson (end of contract)
11	FW	CRC	Marco Ureña (to (Denmark) Brøndby IF)
13	DF	DEN	Alexander Munksgaard (loan to (Denmark) Lyngby BK)
14	FW	CZE	Václav Kadlec (to (Czech Republic) Sparta Prague)
20	DF	FIN	Daniel O'Shaughnessy (loan return to (England) Brentford)
25	GK	POL	Patryk Wolański (Free agent)
27	MF	DEN	Pione Sisto (to (Spain) Celta de Vigo)
29	MF	DEN	Jonas Gemmer (loan to (Denmark) AC Horsens)
32	DF	DEN	Kristian Bak Nielsen (retired)
45	MF	AUS	Awer Mabil (loan to (Denmark) Esbjerg fB)
77	MF	AUT	Daniel Royer (to (United States) New York Red Bulls)
—	MF	NGR	Musefiu Ashiru (to (Slovakia) 1. FC Tatran)

=== Winter ===
In: Note: Flags indicate national team as defined under FIFA eligibility rules; some limited exceptions apply. Players may hold more than one non-FIFA nationality.

No.	Pos.	Nation	Player
5	DF	DEN	Marc Dal Hende (from (Denmark) SønderjyskE)
9	MF	DEN	Janus Drachmann (from (Denmark) SønderjyskE)
14	MF	SWE	Simon Kroon (from (Denmark) SønderjyskE)

Out: Note: Flags indicate national team as defined under FIFA eligibility rules; some limited exceptions apply. Players may hold more than one non-FIFA nationality.

No.	Pos.	Nation	Player
10	FW	AUT	Martin Pušić (loan to (Netherlands) Sparta Rotterdam)
17	MF	SWE	Kristoffer Olsson (to (Sweden) AIK)
19	MF	DEN	Marco Larsen (loan to (Denmark) HB Køge)
26	DF	DEN	Patrick Banggaard (to (Germany) Darmstadt 98)
44	FW	SWE	Zackarias Faour (loan return to (England) Manchester City)

== Friendlies ==
22 June 2016	(Denmark) Midtjylland	2 – 1	(Denmark) Esbjerg fB	Skjern
17:30 CEST		Report

25 June 2016	(Denmark) Midtjylland	1 – 0	(Denmark) Randers	Herning
12:00 CEST		Report		Stadium: MCH Arena

3 July 2016	(Denmark) Skive IK	0 – 4	(Denmark) Midtjylland
14:00 CEST		Report

10 July 2016	(Denmark) AC Horsens	0 – 2	(Denmark) Midtjylland
13:00 CEST		Report

20 January 2017	(Denmark) Midtjylland	2 – 2	(Denmark) Vendsyssel FF
14:00 CET		Report

27 January 2017	(Denmark) Midtjylland	1 – 2	(Denmark) Silkeborg IF
14:00 CET		Report

2 February 2017	(Denmark) Midtjylland	4 – 1	(Denmark) Skive IK
14:30 CET		Report

8 February 2017	(Sweden) AIK	1 – 1 (a.e.t.) (3 – 4 p)	(Denmark) Midtjylland
12:00 CET		Report

10 February 2017	(Denmark) Midtjylland	1 – 2	(Sweden) BK Häcken
12:00 CET		Report

== Competitions ==
=== Danish Superliga ===
==== League tables ====
Regular season
Pos	Team	Pld	W	D	L	GF	GA	GD	Pts	Qualification
3	Lyngby	26	11	6	9	25	23	+2	39	Qualification for the championship round
4	SønderjyskE	26	10	9	7	30	32	−2	39	Qualification for the championship round
5	Midtjylland	26	10	8	8	44	29	+15	38	Qualification for the championship round
6	Nordsjælland	26	9	8	9	41	41	0	35	Qualification for the championship round
7	Randers	26	9	6	11	26	32	−6	33	Qualification for the relegation round

Source: DBU, Soccerway
Rules for classification: 1) Points; 2) Goal difference; 3) Goals scored; 4) Away goals scored; 5) Play-off (played on neutral ground if determining teams for different rounds); 6) Draw.

Championship round
Pos	Team	Pld	W	D	L	GF	GA	GD	Pts	Qualification
1	Copenhagen (C)	36	25	9	2	74	20	+54	84	Qualification for the Champions League second qualifying round
2	Brøndby	36	18	8	10	62	40	+22	62	Qualification for the Europa League second qualifying round
3	Lyngby	36	17	7	12	42	35	+7	58	Qualification for the Europa League first qualifying round
4	Midtjylland (O)	36	15	9	12	67	53	+14	54	Qualification for the European play-off final
5	Nordsjælland	36	13	10	13	59	55	+4	49	
6	SønderjyskE	36	12	10	14	44	54	−10	46	

Source: Soccerway
Rules for classification: 1) Points; 2) Goal difference; 3) Goals scored; 4) Away goals scored; 5) Play-off (played on neutral ground if determining champion or UEFA competitions); 6) Draw.
(C) Champions; (O) Play-off winners

==== Results summary ====
Overall								Home						Away					
Pld	W	D	L	GF	GA	GD	Pts	W	D	L	GF	GA	GD	W	D	L	GF	GA	GD
26	10	8	8	44	29	+15	38	5	5	3	24	16	+8	5	3	5	20	13	+7

Last updated: 1 April 2017.
Source: Soccerway

==== Results ====
18 July 2016 1	Midtjylland	2 – 2	Randers	Herning
19:00 CEST	Kadlec 41'; Olsson (yellow card) 56'; Onuachu 65'; Duelund (yellow card) 69'; Nissen (yellow card) 82'	Report	Fisker 27'; Agesen (yellow card) 73'; Marxen (yellow card) 76'; Masango 77'	Stadium: MCH Arena; Attendance: 5,725; Referee: Jens Maae

24 July 2016 2	Nordsjælland	0 – 4	Midtjylland	Farum
18:00 CEST	C. Køhler (yellow card) 22'; Ramón (yellow card) 90+2'; C. Tanor (yellow card) 90+3'	Report	Poulsen (yellow card) 21' (goal) 68' (pen.); Sisto 75', 82'; Novák 89'	Stadium: Right to Dream Park; Attendance: 2,619; Referee: Anders Poulsen

31 July 2016 3	Midtjylland	3 – 0	Silkeborg	Herning
14:00 CEST	Duelund 12'; Kadlec 47', 53'; Rømer (yellow card) 75'	Report	Gammelby (yellow card) 33'; Vendelbo (yellow card) 36'; Flinta (yellow card) 79'; Skov (yellow card) 89'	Stadium: MCH Arena; Attendance: 7,625; Referee: Peter Kjærsgaard-Andersen

7 August 2016 4	Midtjylland	3 – 3	Brøndby	Herning
18:00 CEST	Onuachu 66'; Poulsen 86' (pen.), 89' (pen.)	Report	Juelsgård (yellow card) 13'; Pukki 40', 76', 79'; Crone (yellow card) 54'; Holst (yellow card) 73'	Stadium: MCH Arena; Attendance: 8,889; Referee: Jakob Kehlet

13 August 2016 5	Copenhagen	3 – 1	Midtjylland	Copenhagen
18:30 CEST	Kvist (yellow card) 45+1'; Johansson 65'; Dahlin 71' (o.g.); Toutouh 88'	Report	Poulsen 24'; Banggaard (yellow card) 42'; Hansen (yellow card) 90+3'	Stadium: Parken Stadium; Attendance: 12,074; Referee: Mads-Kristoffer Kristoffersen

21 August 2016 6	Midtjylland	2 – 2	SønderjyskE	Herning
18:00 CEST	Kanstrup 16' (o.g.); Novák 58'; Banggaard (yellow card) 90+1'	Report	Madsen 8'; Pedersen (yellow card) 75'; Dal Hende (yellow card) 76'; Okwi (yellow card) 81'; Kanstrup (yellow card) 87'; Hansen 90' (o.g.)	Stadium: MCH Arena; Attendance: 4,690; Referee: Michael Johansen

28 August 2016 7	Viborg	0 – 0	Midtjylland	Viborg
20:00 CEST	Fochive (yellow card) 56'	Report	Riis (yellow card) 88'	Stadium: Energi Viborg Arena; Attendance: 6,043; Referee: Dennis Mogensen

9 September 2016 8	Midtjylland	3 – 0	Esbjerg fB	Herning
20:15 CEST	Onuachu (yellow card) 56'; Pušić 77' (pen.); Rømer 84'; Borring 87'	Report	Laursen (yellow card) 13'; Andersen (yellow card) 73'	Stadium: MCH Arena; Attendance: 7,161; Referee: Mads-Kristoffer Kristoffersen

18 September 2016 9	Odense	0 – 1	Midtjylland	Odense
14:00 CEST	Edmundsson (yellow card) 11'; Lund (yellow card) 49'; Festersen (yellow card) 74'; Mikkelsen (yellow card) 85'	Report	Hansen (yellow card) 51'; Halsti (yellow card) 53'; Olsson 75'; Banggaard (yellow card) 88'; Poulsen (yellow card) 90+3'	Stadium: TRE-FOR Park; Attendance: 6,520; Referee: Michael Johansen

21 September 2016 10	AGF	1 – 1	Midtjylland	Aarhus
20:00 CEST	Pedersen (yellow card) 41'; Rasmussen 48'; Jovanović (yellow card) 76'	Report	Novák 51'	Stadium: Ceres Park; Attendance: 8,575; Referee: Jørgen Daugbjerg Burchardt

25 September 2016 11	Midtjylland	5 – 2	Horsens	Herning
18:00 CEST	Banggaard (yellow card) 7'; Wikheim 10' van der Vaart 34'; Rømer (yellow card) 51'; Duelund 54', 88'; Onuachu 79'	Report	Aabech 7' (pen.); Hansson 22'; Sanneh (yellow card) 49'	Stadium: MCH Arena; Attendance: 8,008; Referee: Jens Maae

2 October 2016 12	Lyngby	1 – 0	Midtjylland	Kongens Lyngby
14:00 CEST	Lumb (yellow card) 17'; Larsen 38'	Report	Bruninho (yellow card) 79'	Stadium: Lyngby Stadion; Attendance: 1,957; Referee: Jakob Kehlet

16 October 2016 13	Midtjylland	2 – 0	AaB	Herning
18:00 CEST	Banggaard 40'; Riis (yellow card) 87'; Wikheim 90+1'	Report	Kristensen (yellow card) 8'; Pedersen (yellow card) 66'; Würtz (yellow card) 90'	Stadium: MCH Arena; Attendance: 8,617; Referee: Michael Tykgaard

24 October 2016 14	Esbjerg fB	1 – 3	Midtjylland	Esbjerg
19:00 CEST	Mabil 24'	Report	Hansen (yellow card) 14'; Borring 26'; Poulsen 62'; Duelund 64'	Stadium: Blue Water Arena; Attendance: 4,473; Referee: Morten Krogh

30 October 2016 15	Midtjylland	1 – 3	Copenhagen	Herning
18:00 CET	Pušić 90'	Report	Santander 3', 28'; Delaney (yellow card) 45'; Kvist (yellow card) 47'; Cornelius 85'	Stadium: MCH Arena; Attendance: 10,624; Referee: Anders Poulsen

6 November 2016 16	Horsens	1 – 5	Midtjylland	Horsens
14:00 CET	Jespersen 22'	Report	Onuachu 19', 80'; Borring 43'; Hassan 57'; Novák 60'; Duelund (yellow card) 72'	Stadium: CASA Arena Horsens; Attendance: 1,962; Referee: Jørgen Daugbjerg Burchardt

20 November 2016 17	SønderjyskE	1 – 0	Midtjylland	Haderslev
18:00 CET	Madsen (yellow card) 77'; Zinckernagel 85'	Report	Nissen (yellow card) 34'; Rømer (red card) 44' van der Vaart (yellow card) 44'; Banggaard (yellow card) 81'	Stadium: Sydbank Park; Attendance: 3,322; Referee: Michael Johansen

28 November 2016 18	Midtjylland	1 – 0	Odense	Herning
19:00 CET	Nissen 4'	Report	Edmundsson (yellow card) 79'	Stadium: MCH Arena; Attendance: 6,242; Referee: Jakob Kehlet

1 December 2016 19	Silkeborg	2 – 1	Midtjylland	Silkeborg
18:00 CET	Helenius 57', 62'; S. Skytte (yellow card) 83'; Dahl (yellow card) 90'	Report	Olsson (yellow card) 28'; Hansen (yellow card) 62'; Onuachu 74'	Stadium: Mascot Park; Attendance: 2,943; Referee: Lars Christoffersen

4 December 2016 20	Midtjylland	0 – 1	AGF	Herning
18:00 CET		Report	Ikonomidis (yellow card) 40'; Andersen 66'	Stadium: MCH Arena; Attendance: 6,135; Referee: Jens Maae

11 December 2016 21	Brøndby	2 – 1	Midtjylland	Brøndby
18:00 CET	Pukki 25', 79'	Report	van der Vaart 43'; Onuachu (yellow card) 65'	Stadium: Brøndby Stadium; Attendance: 11,065; Referee: Mads-Kristoffer Kristoffersen

19 February 2017 22	Midtjylland	0 – 0	Viborg	Herning
18:00 CET	Sparv (yellow card) 36' (yellow-red card); Duelund (yellow card) 59'; Wikheim (yellow card) 61'; Hansen (yellow card) 90+4'	Report	Pallesen (yellow card) 61'; Moberg (yellow card) 72'; Frederiksen (yellow card) 79'	Stadium: MCH Arena; Attendance: 8,909; Referee: Michael Johansen

24 February 2017 23	Randers	0 – 2	Midtjylland	Randers
20:15 CET	Fenger (yellow card) 45'	Report	Rilwan Hassan (yellow card) 27'; Duelund 32'; Nissen (yellow card) 52'; Rømer (yellow card) 64'; Onuachu 90'	Stadium: BioNutria Park Randers; Attendance: 3,941; Referee: Michael Tykgaard

3 March 2017 24	Midtjylland	1 – 1	Lyngby	Herning
20:15 CET	Poulsen 61'; Rømer (yellow card) 66'; Riis (yellow card) 81'	Report	Rygaard Jensen (yellow card) 32'; Kjær 45' (yellow card) 63'; Christjansen (yellow card) 51'; Lumb (yellow card) 59'	Stadium: MCH Arena; Attendance: 5,870; Referee: Peter Kjærsgaard-Andersen

13 March 2017 25	AaB	1 – 1	Midtjylland	Aalborg
19:00 CET	Sloth (yellow card) 45'; Børsting 55'	Report	Riis (yellow card) 24'; Rømer (yellow card) 39'; Poulsen (yellow card) 57'; Onuachu 90+1'	Stadium: Nordjyske Arena; Attendance: 6,641; Referee: Jakob Kehlet

19 March 2017 26	Midtjylland	1 – 2	Nordsjælland	Herning
17:00 CET	Hansen (yellow card) 14'; Riis (yellow card) 17'; Drachmann (yellow card) 35'; Wikheim (yellow card) 42'; Onuachu 83'; Halsti (yellow card) 86'	Report	Ingvartsen 43' (yellow card) 55'; Mtiliga (yellow card) 57'; Donyoh (yellow card) 70'; Marcondes 80'	Stadium: MCH Arena; Attendance: 7,350; Referee: Jens Maae

=== European play-off final ===
1 June 2017

Midtjylland	3–0	Randers
Onuachu 37'; R.Nicolaisen 67'; Borring 69'	Report

MCH Arena, Herning
Attendance: 5,534
Referee: Mads-Kristoffer Kristoffersen

=== Danish Cup ===
27 October 2016 Third round	Fremad Amager	1 – 3	Midtjylland	Copenhagen
19:45 CEST	O. Şenoğlu 82'	Report	Duelund 34'; Olsson 58'; Onuachu 90+2'	Stadium: Sundby Idrætspark; Attendance: 2,588

7 March 2017 Fourth round	Kjellerup	0 – 3	Midtjylland	Silkeborg
17:45 CET	J. Nielsen (yellow card) 77'	Report	Bruninho 14'; Duelund 17'; Kroon 34'; Nissen (yellow card) 88'	Stadium: Mascot Park; Attendance: 1,321; Referee: Jørgen Daugbjerg Burchardt

5 April 2017 Quarterfinals	AaB	2 – 3	Midtjylland	Aalborg
CEST		Report		Stadium: Nordjyske Arena; Attendance: 4,124

4 May 2017 Semifinal	Midtjylland	1 – 2	Brøndby	Herning
CEST		Report		Stadium: MCH Arena; Attendance: 9,475

=== UEFA Europa League ===
30 June 2016 First qualifying round 1st leg	Midtjylland (Denmark)	1 – 0	(Lithuania) FK Sūduva	Herning, Denmark
19:00 CEST	Onuachu 56'	Report	Leimonas (yellow card) 62'; Jablan (yellow card) 78'; Pavlović (yellow card) 90+3'	Stadium: MCH Arena; Attendance: 4,347; Referee: Srđan Jovanović (Serbia)

7 July 2016 First qualifying round 2nd leg	FK Sūduva (Lithuania)	0 – 1 (0 – 2 agg.)	(Denmark) Midtjylland	Marijampolė, Lithuania
19:00 CEST	Slavickas (yellow card) 69'; Švrljuga (yellow card) 72'	Report	Novák 16'	Stadium: Sūduva Stadium; Attendance: 1,738; Referee: Peter Kralović (Slovakia)

14 July 2016 Second qualifying round 1st leg	Midtjylland (Denmark)	3 – 0	(Liechtenstein) Vaduz	Herning, Denmark
18:30 CEST	Sisto 21', 82'; Novák (yellow card) 57'; Pušić (yellow card) 62'; Onuachu 73'	Report	Avdijaj (yellow card) 82'	Stadium: MCH Arena; Attendance: 4,455; Referee: Kirill Levnikov (Russia)

21 July 2016 Second qualifying round 1st leg	Vaduz (Liechtenstein)	2 – 2 (2 – 5 agg.)	(Denmark) Midtjylland	Vaduz, Liechtenstein
19:00 CEST	Costanzo (yellow card) 25' (goal) 85' (pen.); M. Strohmaier (yellow card) 64'; M. Brunner 82'; M. Pfründer (yellow card) 90+1'	Report	Sisto 41', 67'; Poulsen (red card) 45+2'; Riis (yellow card) 81'	Stadium: Rheinpark Stadion; Attendance: 842; Referee: Andrew Davey (Northern Ireland)

28 July 2016 Third qualifying round 1st leg	Videoton (Hungary)	0 – 1	(Denmark) Midtjylland	Felcsút, Hungary
20:30 CEST	Pátkai (yellow card) 48'; Filipe Oliveira (yellow card) 88'	Report	Nissen (yellow card) 16'; Novák 55'; Onuachu (yellow card) 78'	Stadium: Pancho Arena; Attendance: 2,899; Referee: Ville Nevalainen (Finland)

4 August 2016 Third qualifying round 2nd leg	Midtjylland (Denmark)	1 – 1 (a.e.t.) (2 – 1 agg.)	(Hungary) Videoton	Herning, Denmark
18:00 CEST	Hansen (yellow card) 23'; Novák (yellow card) 45' (goal) 104'; Onuachu (yellow card) 46'; Banggaard (yellow card) 75'; Duelund (yellow card) 116'	Report	Lang (yellow card) 19'; Paulo Vinícius (red card) 47'; Szolnoki (yellow card) 56'; Barczi (yellow card) 58'; Kovács 75'; Juhász (yellow card) 111'; Bódi (yellow card) 120+2'	Stadium: MCH Arena; Attendance: 6,258; Referee: Marco Guida (Italy)

18 August 2016 Play-off round 1st leg	Midtjylland (Denmark)	0 – 1	(Turkey) Osmanlıspor	Herning, Denmark
18:30 CEST	Onuachu (yellow card) 23'; Halsti (yellow card) 45+2'; Hassan (yellow card) 66'	Report	Kılıçaslan (yellow card) 14'; Banggaard 20' (o.g.); Çürüksu (yellow card) 27'; Delarge (yellow card) 54'; Karčemarskas (yellow card) 86'; Badou (yellow card) 89'	Stadium: MCH Arena; Attendance: 7,003; Referee: István Kovács (Romania)

25 August 2016 Play-off round 2nd leg	Osmanlıspor (Turkey)	2 – 0 (3 – 0 agg.)	(Denmark) Midtjylland	Ankara, Turkey
20:00 CEST	Tiago Pinto 20', 50'; Procházka (yellow card) 54'; Altınay (yellow card) 73'	Report	Kadlec (yellow card) 63'; Pušić (yellow card) 76'	Stadium: Osmanlı Stadyumu; Referee: Yevhen Aranovsky (Ukraine)

== Squad statistics ==
As of Match played 19 March 2017

=== Appearances and goals ===
No.	Pos	Nat	Player	Total		Danish Superliga		Danish Cup		Europa League	
No.	Pos	Nat	Player	Apps	Goals	Apps	Goals	Apps	Goals	Apps	Goals
2	DF	(Denmark) DEN	Kian Hansen	33	0	24	0	1	0	8	0
3	MF	(Finland) FIN	Tim Sparv	5	0	3+1	0	0	0	1	0
6	DF	(Finland) FIN	Markus Halsti	17	0	6+1	0	2	0	7+1	0
7	MF	(Denmark) DEN	Jakob Poulsen	33	6	26	6	1	0	6	0
8	MF	(Netherlands) NED	Rafael van der Vaart	14	2	10+2	2	0+1	0	0+1	0
9	MF	(Denmark) DEN	Janus Drachmann	2	0	1	0	1	0	0	0
11	MF	(Denmark) DEN	Jonas Borring	26	3	14+10	3	2	0	0	0
14	MF	(Sweden) SWE	Simon Kroon	4	1	0+3	0	1	1	0	0
16	GK	(Sweden) SWE	Johan Dahlin	25	0	15	0	2	0	8	0
18	DF	(Denmark) DEN	Kristian Riis	14	0	8+3	0	1	0	0+2	0
20	DF	(Denmark) DEN	Rasmus Nicolaisen	1	0	0	0	0+1	0	0	0
22	MF	(Denmark) DEN	Mikkel Duelund	32	7	16+7	5	2	2	0+7	0
24	FW	(Denmark) DEN	Mads Døhr Thychosen	4	0	0+4	0	0	0	0	0
28	DF	(Denmark) DEN	André Rømer	30	1	20+2	1	1+1	0	3+3	0
31	GK	(Denmark) DEN	Mikkel Andersen	12	0	11+1	0	0	0	0	0
33	FW	(Nigeria) NGR	Paul Onuachu	32	12	18+7	9	1	1	5+1	2
34	MF	(Denmark) DEN	Mikael Anderson	3	0	0+2	0	0+1	0	0	0
36	MF	(Nigeria) NGR	Rilwan Hassan	32	1	21+4	1	0	0	7	0
40	DF	(Denmark) DEN	Andreas Poulsen	1	0	1	0	0	0	0	0
42	MF	(Nigeria) NGR	Babajide David	1	0	0	0	0+1	0	0	0
43	DF	(Denmark) DEN	Rasmus Nissen	35	1	24+1	1	2	0	8	0
70	DF	(Czech Republic) CZE	Filip Novák	33	7	24	4	2	0	7	3
77	FW	(Brazil) BRA	Bruninho	8	1	0+7	0	1	1	0	0
88	MF	(Norway) NOR	Gustav Wikheim	11	2	8+3	2	0	0	0	0
Players who left Midtjylland during the season:
14	FW	(Czech Republic) CZE	Václav Kadlec	15	3	5+2	3	0	0	5+3	0
17	MF	(Sweden) SWE	Kristoffer Olsson	22	2	5+8	1	1	1	7+1	0
26	DF	(Denmark) DEN	Patrick Banggaard	29	1	20	1	1	0	8	0
27	MF	(Denmark) DEN	Pione Sisto	7	6	1+1	2	0	0	5	4
Players away from the club on loan:
10	FW	(Austria) AUT	Martin Pušić	19	2	5+7	2	0+1	0	3+3	0
13	DF	(Denmark) DEN	Alexander Munksgaard	1	0	0+1	0	0	0	0	0
19	MF	(Denmark) DEN	Marco Larsen	2	0	0+1	0	0	0	0+1	0

=== Goal scorers ===
Place	Position	Nation	Number	Name	Danish Superliga	Danish Cup	Europa League	Total
1	FW	(Nigeria)	33	Paul Onuachu	9	1	2	12
2	MF	(Denmark)	22	Mikkel Duelund	5	2	0	7
2	DF	(Czech Republic)	70	Filip Novák	4	0	3	7
4	MF	(Denmark)	7	Jakob Poulsen	6	0	0	6
4	MF	(Denmark)	27	Pione Sisto	2	0	4	6
6	MF	(Denmark)	11	Jonas Borring	3	0	0	3
6	FW	(Czech Republic)	14	Václav Kadlec	3	0	0	3
8	MF	(Netherlands)	8	Rafael van der Vaart	2	0	0	2
8	FW	(Austria)	10	Martin Pušić	2	0	0	2
8	MF	(Sweden)	17	Kristoffer Olsson	1	1	0	2
8	MF	(Norway)	88	Gustav Wikheim	2	0	0	2
12	MF	(Sweden)	14	Simon Kroon	0	1	0	1
12	DF	(Denmark)	26	Patrick Banggaard	1	0	0	1
12	DF	(Denmark)	28	André Rømer	1	0	0	1
12	MF	(Nigeria)	36	Rilwan Hassan	1	0	0	1
12	DF	(Denmark)	43	Rasmus Nissen	1	0	0	1
12	FW	(Brazil)	77	Bruninho	0	1	0	1
12	#	Own goals			1	0	0	1
TOTALS					44	6	9	59

=== Disciplinary record ===
Number	Nation	Position	Name	Danish Superliga		Danish Cup		Europa League		Total	
Number	Nation	Position	Name	Yellow card	Red card	Yellow card	Red card	Yellow card	Red card	Yellow card	Red card
2	(Denmark)	DF	Kian Hansen	6	0	0	0	1	0	7	0
3	(Finland)	MF	Tim Sparv	2	1	0	0	0	0	2	1
6	(Finland)	DF	Markus Halsti	2	0	0	0	1	0	3	0
7	(Denmark)	MF	Jakob Poulsen	3	0	0	0	0	1	3	1
8	(Netherlands)	MF	Rafael van der Vaart	1	0	0	0	0	0	1	0
9	(Denmark)	MF	Janus Drachmann	1	0	0	0	0	0	1	0
10	(Austria)	FW	Martin Pušić	0	0	0	0	2	0	2	0
14	(Czech Republic)	FW	Václav Kadlec	0	0	0	0	1	0	1	0
17	(Sweden)	MF	Kristoffer Olsson	2	0	0	0	0	0	2	0
18	(Denmark)	DF	Kristian Riis	5	0	0	0	1	0	6	0
22	(Denmark)	MF	Mikkel Duelund	3	0	0	0	1	0	3	0
26	(Denmark)	DF	Patrick Banggaard	5	0	0	0	1	0	6	0
28	(Denmark)	DF	André Rømer	5	1	0	0	0	0	5	1
33	(Nigeria)	FW	Paul Onuachu	2	0	0	0	3	0	5	0
36	(Nigeria)	MF	Rilwan Hassan	1	0	0	0	1	0	2	0
43	(Denmark)	DF	Rasmus Nissen	3	0	1	0	1	0	5	0
70	(Czech Republic)	DF	Filip Novák	0	0	0	0	2	0	2	0
77	(Brazil)	FW	Bruninho	1	0	0	0	0	0	1	0
88	(Norway)	MF	Gustav Wikheim	2	0	0	0	0	0	2	0
TOTALS				44	2	1	0	15	1	59	3
