= 2017–18 FC Midtjylland season =

Midtjylland
2017–18 season
- Owner: Matthew Benham
- Chairman: Rasmus Ankersen
- Manager: Jess Thorup
- Stadium: MCH Arena
- Superliga: Champions
- Danish Cup: Semi-finals
- UEFA Europa League: Play-off round
- Top goalscorer: League: Frank Onyeka; Marc Dal Hende (11 each); All: Paul Onuachu (17 goals)
Home colours	Away colours	Third colours

The 2017–18 FC Midtjylland season was FC Midtjylland's 19th season of existence, and their 17th consecutive season in the Danish Superliga, the top tier of football in Denmark. Outside of the Superliga, Midtjylland competed in the Danish Cup and the UEFA Europa League qualifying rounds.

The 2017–18 campaign saw Midtjylland win their second Danish Superliga title, and their first since 2015. The club also reached the semifinals of the 2017–18 Danish Cup, and the play-off round of the 2017–18 UEFA Europa League.

== Squad ==
As of 21 May 2018

No.	Name	Nat	Position	Since	Date of birth (age)	Signed from	Games	Goals
Goalkeepers
1	Jesper Hansen	(Denmark)	GK	2017	x	(Denmark) Lyngby BK	27	0
16	Bill Hamid	(United States)	GK	2018	x	(United States) D.C. United	1	0
30	Oliver Ottesen	(Denmark)	GK	2017	x	(Denmark) Roskilde	0	0
Defenders
2	Kian Hansen	(Denmark)						
4	Zsolt Korcsmár	(Hungary)						
5	Marc Dal Hende	(Denmark)						
6	Markus Halsti	(Finland)						
13	Alexander Munksgaard	(Denmark)						
20	Rasmus Nicolaisen	(Denmark)						
24	Mads Døhr Thychosen	(Denmark)						
25	Bubacarr Sanneh	(The Gambia)						
28	Erik Sviatchenko	(Denmark)						
40	Andreas Poulsen	(Denmark)						
Midfielders
3	Tim Sparv	(Finland)						
8	Rafael van der Vaart	(Netherlands)						
9	Janus Drachmann	(Denmark)						
15	Bozhidar Kraev	(Bulgaria)						
17	Michael Baidoo	(Ghana)						
21	Kaan Kairinen	(Finland)						
22	Mikkel Duelund	(Denmark)						
36	Rilwan Hassan	(Nigeria)						
38	Frank Onyeka	(Nigeria)						
Forwards
26	Artem Dovbyk	(Ukraine)						
33	Paul Onuachu	(Nigeria)						
88	Gustav Wikheim	(Norway)						

== Non-competitive ==
=== Preseason exhibitions ===
20 June 2017	(Denmark) Brande IF	0–10	(Denmark) Midtjylland
19:00		Report

24 June 2017	(Denmark) Midtjylland	1–0	(Denmark) AaB	MCH Arena
13:00		Report

8 July 2017	(Denmark) Horsens	1–0	(Denmark) Midtjylland	CASA Arena Horsens
13:00		Report

=== Mid-season exhibitions ===
17 January 2018	(Germany) 1. FC Kaiserslautern	1-0	(Denmark) FC Midtjylland	Fritz-Walter-Stadion
18:30		Report

19 January 2018	(Denmark) Midtjylland	2-2	(Denmark) Hobro	MCH Arena
13:00		Report

26 January 2018	(Denmark) Midtjylland	0-2	(Denmark) Vendsyssel	MCH Arena
13:00		Report

3 February 2018	(Denmark) Midtjylland	3-1	(Sweden) AIK	Maktoum bin Rashid Al Maktoum Stadium
15:00		Report

3 February 2018	(Denmark) Midtjylland	1-2	(China) Guangzhou Evergrande Taobao	Maktoum bin Rashid Al Maktoum Stadium
21:30		Report

== Competitive ==
=== Danish Superliga ===
==== League table ====
Pos	Team	Pld	W	D	L	GF	GA	GD	Pts	Qualification
1	Brøndby	26	18	6	2	58	24	+34	60	Qualification for the Championship round
2	Midtjylland	26	19	3	4	60	29	+31	60	Qualification for the Championship round
3	Nordsjælland	26	15	5	6	62	41	+21	50	Qualification for the Championship round
4	Copenhagen	26	13	5	8	50	33	+17	44	Qualification for the Championship round
5	Aalborg	26	8	12	6	28	27	+1	36	Qualification for the Championship round

Source: Danish Football Association (in Danish), Soccerway
Rules for classification: 1) Points; 2) Goal difference; 3) Goals scored; 4) Away goals scored; 5) Play-off (played on neutral ground if determining teams for different rounds); 6) Draw.

=== Danish Cup ===
20 September 2017 3rd Round	Greve	0–7	Midtjylland	Greve Strand
16:30		Summary		Stadium: Greve Idræts Center

25 October 2017 4th Round	OB	0–3	Midtjylland	Odense
10:00		Summary	Duelund 36'; Sørloth 54'; Kraev 87'	Stadium: EWII Park; Referee: Mads-Kristoffer Kristoffersen

12 April 2018 Quarterfinals	Hobro IK	1–2 (a.e.t.)	Midtjylland	Hobro
12:30	Mikkelsen 109'	Summary	Kraev 98', 112'	Stadium: DS Arena; Attendance: 1,382; Referee: Mads-Kristoffer Kristoffersen

26 April 2018 Semifinals	Brøndby IF	3–1	Midtjylland	Brøndby
18:30	Wilczek 1', 65'; Pukki 15'	Summary	Wikheim 48'	Stadium: Brøndby Stadium; Attendance: 14,794; Referee: Mads-Kristoffer Kristoffersen

=== UEFA Europa League ===
==== First qualifying round ====
29 June 2017 First leg	Midtjylland (Denmark)	6–1	(Republic of Ireland) Derry City	Herning
20:00 CEST	Hende 4'; Riis 15'; Poulsen 44' (pen.); Kroon 58' 62'; Kraev 84'; Sørloth (yellow card) 90+3'	Report	Boyle (yellow card) 60'; Ronan Curtis 66'	Stadium: MCH Arena; Attendance: 5,122; Referee: Markus Hameter (Austria)

6 July 2017 Second leg	Derry City (Republic of Ireland)	1–4 (2–10 agg.)	(Denmark) Midtjylland	Sligo
20:45 CEST	Scot Whiteside (yellow card) 29'; Aaron McEneff 41'; Sam Todd (yellow card) 90+2'	Report	Onuachu 7' 39' 69'; Kroon (yellow card) 37'; Riis (yellow card) 44'; Wikheim 59'; Hansen (yellow card) 73'	Stadium: The Showgrounds; Attendance: 467; Referee: Rade Obrenović (Slovenia)

==== Second qualifying round ====
13 July 2017 First leg	Ferencváros (Hungary)	2–4	(Denmark) Midtjylland	Budapest
21:00 CEST	Botka 22' (yellow card) 76'; Varga 42'; Koch (red card) 45+1'; Moutari (yellow card) 64'; Batik (yellow card) 83'	Report	Drachmann (yellow card) 33'; Poulsen 45+1' (pen.) 61' 67' (pen.); Hende (yellow card) 60'; Hansen (yellow card) 72'; Korcsmár (yellow card) 75'; Onuachu 90'	Stadium: Groupama Arena; Attendance: 8,034; Referee: Sandro Schärer (Switzerland)

20 July 2017 Second leg	Midtjylland (Denmark)	3–1 (7–3 agg.)	(Hungary) Ferencváros	Herning
19:00 CEST	Onuachu (yellow card) 30'; Wikheim 34'; Drachmann (yellow card) 40'; Hende (yellow card) 65'; Nissen 71'; Sørloth (yellow card) 72' (goal) 81'	Report	Csernik (yellow card) 4'; Moutari (yellow card) 13'; Priskin (yellow card) 38'; Rui Pedro 64'	Stadium: MCH Arena; Attendance: 5,413; Referee: Alper Ulusoy (Turkey)

==== Third qualifying round ====
27 July 2017 First leg	Arka Gdynia (Poland)	3–2	(Denmark) Midtjylland	Gdynia
20:00 CEST	Marcus Vinicius 31' 39' (pen.) (yellow card) 90+2'; Piesio (yellow card) 52'; Siemaszko 90+2'	Report	Hassan 33'; Hende 36'	Stadium: Stadion Miejski w Gdyni; Attendance: 14,037; Referee: Enea Jorgji (Albania)

3 August 2017 Second leg	Midtjylland (Denmark)	2–1 (4–4 (a) agg.)	(Poland) Arka Gdynia	Herning
20:30 CEST	Hassan (yellow card) 57'; Socha 78' (o.g.); Sørloth 90+3'	Report	Socha (yellow card) 5'; Marcus Vinicius (yellow card) 42'; Sobieraj (yellow card) 45+3'; Sołdecki 59'	Stadium: MCH Arena; Attendance: 8,138; Referee: Eitan Shmuelevich (Israel)

==== Play-off round ====
17 August 2017 First leg	Apollon Limassol (Cyprus)	3–2	(Denmark) Midtjylland	Larnaca
19:00 CEST	Kyriakou 15'; Maglica (yellow card) 54'; Alex da Silva (yellow card) 62'; Jander 69'; Ioannis Pittas 90+1'	Report	Hassan (yellow card) 27'; Sørloth 38' 74'; Hende (yellow card) 53'; Drachmann (yellow card) 68'	Stadium: AEK Arena; Attendance: 5,250; Referee: Michael Oliver (England)

24 August 2017 Second leg	Midtjylland (Denmark)	1–1 (3–4 agg.)	(Cyprus) Apollon Limassol	Herning
20:00 CEST	Hassan 10'; Sørloth (yellow card) 37'; Rømer (yellow card) 40'; Nissen (yellow card) 67'; Korcsmár (yellow card) 81'	Report	Jander (yellow card) 47'; Schembri 50'; João Pedro (yellow card) 64'; Adrián Sardinero (yellow card) 85'	Stadium: MCH Arena; Attendance: 9,022; Referee: Robert Schörgenhofer (Austria)

== Statistics ==
As of 30 June 2017

=== Top goalscorers ===
Player	Goals
(Nigeria) Frank Onyeka (Denmark) Marc Dal Hende	11
(Norway) Alexander Sørloth (Nigeria) Paul Onuachu	10
(Denmark) Mikkel Duelund (Denmark) Jakob Poulsen (Denmark) Gustav Wikheim	8
(The Gambia) Bubacarr Sanneh (Czech Republic) Filip Novak (Denmark) Rasmus Kristensen	3
(Hungary) Zsolt Korcsmár	2
(Ukraine) Artem Dovbyk (Bulgaria) Bozhidar Kraev (Denmark) Erik Sviatchenko (Denmark) Jonas Borring (Denmark) Kian Hansen (Denmark) Mads Thychosen (Finland) Tim Sparv	1
