= Tim Sparv =

Finnish footballer (born 1987)

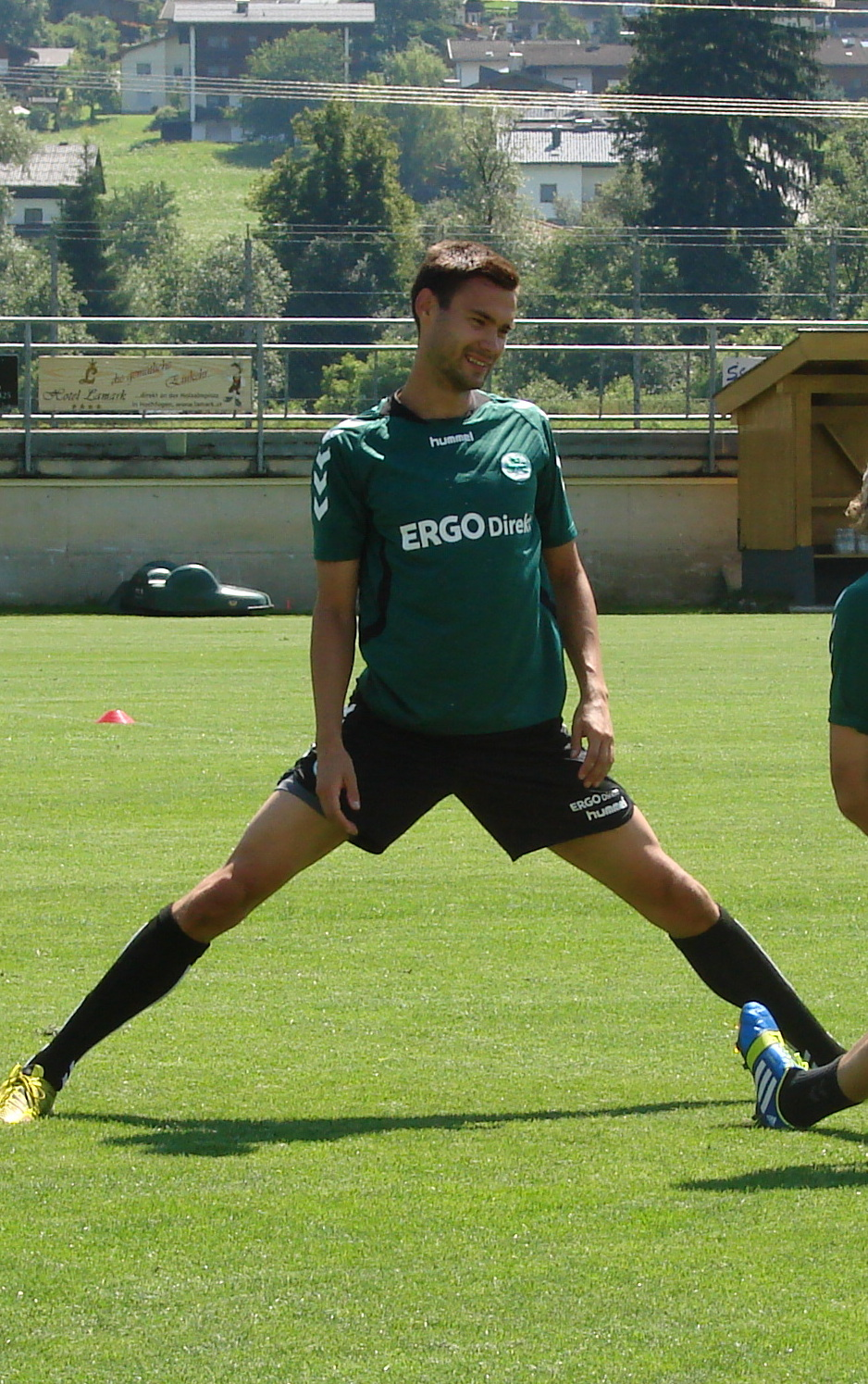
- Sparv in 2013

Personal information
- Date of birth: 20 February 1987 (age 39)
- Place of birth: Oravais, Finland
- Height: 1.94 m (6 ft 4 in)
- Position: Defensive midfielder

Team information
- Current team: Mafra (manager)

Youth career
- 1993–2003: Norrvalla FF
- 2003–2006: Southampton

Senior career*
Years	Team	Apps	(Gls)
2006–2007	Southampton	0	(0)
2007–2009	Halmstad	51	(1)
2008	→ VPS (loan)	8	(0)
2010–2013	Groningen	98	(4)
2013–2014	Greuther Fürth	28	(1)
2014–2020	Midtjylland	143	(3)
2020–2021	AEL	19	(1)
2021	HJK	5	(0)
Total		352	(10)

International career
2002	Finland U15	6	(1)
2003	Finland U16	10	(1)
2003–2004	Finland U17	12	(0)
2004–2005	Finland U18	14	(0)
2004–2006	Finland U19	5	(0)
2006–2009	Finland U21	19	(6)
2009–2021	Finland	84	(1)

Managerial career
- 2022–2024: Sparta Prague B (assistant)
- 2023: Sparta Prague B (interim)
- 2024–2025: Sparta Prague (assistant)
- 2024–2026: Finland (assistant)
- 2025–2026: Sparta Prague (development coach)
- 2026–: Mafra
Medal record
Finland national football team
Second place	Baltic Cup	2012
Third place	Baltic Cup	2014
- * Club domestic league appearances and goals

Tim Sparv (born 20 February 1987) is a Finnish football coach and a former professional footballer who played as a defensive midfielder. He is currently working as an assistant coach of the Finland national football team. Sparv was born in Oravais, and started his football career in Norrvalla FF youth team before moving to Southampton's junior organisation. He began his senior club career playing for Halmstad, before signing with Groningen in 2010.

Sparv made his international debut for Finland in February 2009, at the age of 21 and went on to make 84 caps, including appearing in 2010, 2014 and 2018 FIFA World Cup qualifications. His family is a member of the Swedish-speaking population of Finland.

== Club career ==
=== Southampton ===
Born in Oravais, Ostrobothnia, Sparv spent three years in the youth academy of Southampton. He was a member of Southampton's youth team that reached the final of the FA Youth Cup in 2005, where he played alongside Theo Walcott, losing on aggregate to Ipswich Town. He was named in the first team squad for 2006–07 season and made numerous reserve team appearances but, as Southampton had a plethora of midfielders from which to choose, he was unable to break through into the first team itself.

=== Halmstad ===
On 7 January 2007, he moved to Halmstads BK to play in Allsvenskan, on the advice of both his father and former Halmstads BK player Michael Svensson. He made his Allsvenskan debut on 9 April 2007 in a match against Helsingborg when he replaced Andreas Johansson as a substitute for the second period. On 1 May 2008, he was loaned out to Vaasan Palloseura after suffering illness as well as a lack of playing time with Halmstads.

=== Groningen ===
In August 2009, he was close to a move to Groningen, but Halmstad refused to let him go at that point. On 14 August, FC Groningen announced that Sparv would join them as of 1 January 2010. He made his Eredivisie debut on 7 March 2010 in a 1–0 victory over VVV-Venlo, coming on for Fredrik Stenman in the 78th minute. He scored his first goal for Groningen in the opening match of the 2010–11 season, a 1–1 draw against AZ. His goal came in the 76th minute.

=== Greuther Fürth ===
In May 2013 Sparv signed a three-year contract with Greuther Fürth. He made his 2. Bundesliga debut on 21 July 2013 in a match against Arminia Bielefeld. He scored his first and only league goal for the club on 30 September 2013 in a 4–0 victory over Dynamo Dresden. The goal was the last of the game and came in the 86th minute.

=== FC Midtjylland ===
On 3 July 2014, Tim Sparv signed a four-year contract with Danish Superliga side FC Midtjylland. On 20 August 2015, he scored against former club Southampton in the 2015–16 Europa League play-off first leg, which ended in a 1–1 draw. He also started the second leg in Denmark which Midtjylland won, to secure the Danish club a place in the group stage and send Southampton out of the competition.

=== AEL ===
On 26 August 2020, Sparv signed a two-year contract with Greek Super League club AEL. On 14 May 2021, there was an official announcement about the termination of the player's contract by mutual agreement.

=== HJK ===
On 22 July 2021, Sparv joined HJK. He made his debut on 12 August when he came in as a substitute for Filip Valenčič on 82nd minute in a UEFA Europa League match against Neftçi Baku.

== International career ==
=== Finland youth teams ===
Sparv was the second youngest player in the squad for the 2003 FIFA U-17 World Championship played at home but did not make an appearance in the tournament. He made his Finland U21 debut on 7 October 2006 and played a big part in the successful 2009 European Championship qualifying campaign, playing in nine out of ten games and scoring three goals. He was made team captain during the 2009 UEFA European Under-21 Football Championship and scored a penalty in a 2–1 defeat by England on 15 June 2009.

=== Finland first team ===
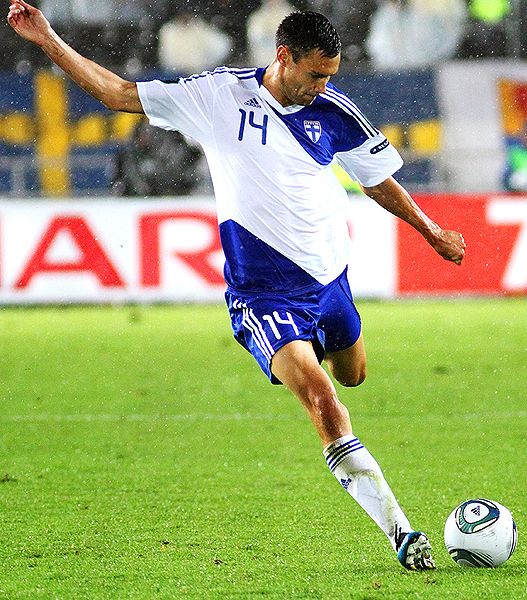
Sparv playing for Finland in 2011

On 4 February 2009, Sparv made his debut for the senior team in a friendly match against Japan, which ended in a 5–1 defeat. He played his first FIFA World Cup qualification game on 10 October 2009 when Stuart Baxter chose him to the starting line up against Wales in Helsinki Olympic Stadium. He was named captain of the national team for the first time for a match against Greece on 4 September 2015.

Sparv was called up for the UEFA Euro 2020 pre-tournament friendly match against Sweden on 29 May 2021. In UEFA Euro 2020 Group B he captained Finland in matches against Denmark and Belgium but missed match against Russia.

== Coaching career ==
Since his retirement, Sparv has worked for Sparta Prague as a youth coach and an assistant coach for Sparta Prague B.

On 17 June 2024, he was named the assistant coach of Sparta Prague first team for the 2024–25 season, under the new head coach Lars Friis. Later in the same day, Sparv was also named an assistant coach of the Finland national football team.

On 23 June 2025, Sparv was named the development coach of Sparta Prague.

On 29 May 2026, Sparv was appointed manager of Liga 3 club Mafra.

== Personal life ==
Sparv is a Swedish-speaking Finn.

Sparv is in a relationship with Jitka Nováčková, a Czech model and winner of the Czech Miss 2011 beauty pageant. Their daughter Leah Elissa was born on 11 January 2021.

In September 2021, Sparv publicly criticized the conditions for migrant workers that had been constructing the stadiums for the 2022 FIFA World Cup in Qatar in an article in The Players' Tribune.

Sparv endorsed Pekka Haavisto for President of Finland during the 2024 Finnish presidential election.

== Career statistics ==
=== Club ===
Appearances and goals by club, season and competition
Club	Season	League			National Cup		Europe		Total	
Club	Season	Division	Apps	Goals	Apps	Goals	Apps	Goals	Apps	Goals
Halmstad	2007	Allsvenskan	12	0	0	0	—		12	0
Halmstad	2008	Allsvenskan	13	0	0	0	—		13	0
Halmstad	2009	Allsvenskan	26	1	1	0	—		27	1
Halmstad	Total		51	1	1	0	0	0	52	1
VPS (loan)	2008	Veikkausliiga	8	0	0	0	—		8	0
Groningen	2009–10	Eredivisie	11	0	0	0	—		11	0
Groningen	2010–11	Eredivisie	34	2	3	0	—		37	2
Groningen	2011–12	Eredivisie	30	0	1	0	—		31	0
Groningen	2012–13	Eredivisie	23	2	1	0	—		24	2
Groningen	Total		98	4	5	0	0	0	103	4
Greuther Fürth	2013–14	2. Bundesliga	28	1	4	0	—		32	1
Midtjylland	2014–15	Danish Superliga	29	0	2	0	1 (Note: Appearances in the UEFA Europa League)	0	31	0
Midtjylland	2015–16	Danish Superliga	31	0	0	0	14 (Note: Four appearances in the UEFA Champions League, ten appearances in the UEFA Europa League)	1	45	1
Midtjylland	2016–17	Danish Superliga	5	0	0	0	1	0	6	0
Midtjylland	2017–18	Danish Superliga	31	1	2	0	8	0	41	1
Midtjylland	2018–19	Danish Superliga	21	2	4	0	4 (Note: Two appearances in the UEFA Champions League, two appearances in the UEFA Europa League)	0	29	2
Midtjylland	2019–20	Danish Superliga	16	0	0	0	2	0	7	0
Midtjylland	Total		133	3	8	0	30	1	171	4
Larissa	2020–21	Super League Greece	19	1	0	0	—		19	1
HJK	2021	Veikkausliiga	5	0	0	0	4 (Note: Three appearances in the UEFA Europa League, one appearance in UEFA Conference League)	0	9	0
Career total			342	10	18	0	34	1	394	11

=== International ===
Appearances and goals by national team and year
National team	Year	Competitive		Friendly		Total	
National team	Year	Apps	Goals	Apps	Goals	Apps	Goals
Finland	2009	2	0	3	0	5	0
Finland	2010	3	0	4	0	7	0
Finland	2011	2	0	4	0	6	0
Finland	2012	2	0	7	1	9	1
Finland	2013	4	0	3	0	7	0
Finland	2014	4	0	5	0	9	0
Finland	2015	6	0	1	0	7	0
Finland	2016	0	0	4	0	4	0
Finland	2017	3	0	0	0	3	0
Finland	2018	4	0	4	0	8	0
Finland	2019	7	0	2	0	9	0
Finland	2020	5	0	0	0	5	0
Finland	2021	4	0	1	0	5	0
Total		46	0	38	1	84	1

Scores and results list Finland's goal tally first, score column indicates score after each Sparv goal.

List of international goals scored by Tim Sparv
No.	Date	Venue	Opponent	Score	Result	Competition
1	15 August 2012	Windsor Park, Belfast, Northern Ireland	Northern Ireland	1–2	3–3	Friendly

== Honours ==
HJK

- Veikkausliiga: 2021

FC Midtjylland

- Danish Superliga: 2014–15, 2017–18, 2019–20
- Danish Cup: 2018–19

Finland

- Baltic Cup: runner-up 2012; bronze 2014

Individual

- Football Association of Finland: Captain's Ball 2021
- Finland U21 Player of the Year: 2007
- FC Midtjylland Player of the Year: 2015
- Finnish Footballer of the Year: 2015
