= Janus Drachmann =

Danish footballer (born 1988)

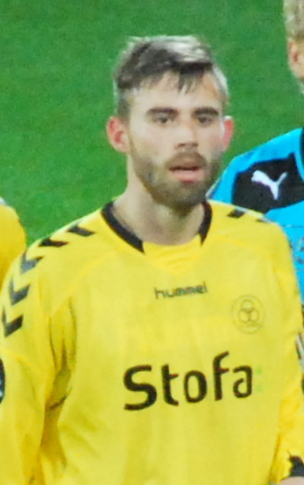
- Drachmann in 2012

Personal information
- Full name: Janus Mats Drachmann
- Date of birth: 11 May 1988 (age 38)
- Place of birth: Frederikssund, Denmark
- Height: 1.79 m (5 ft 10 in)
- Position: Midfielder

Team information
- Current team: Horsens (staff)

Youth career
- 1994–2002: ORI-Fodbold
- 2002–2003: Frederikssund
- 2003–2005: Farum
- 2005–2006: Grenaa

Senior career*
Years	Team	Apps	(Gls)
2006–2015	Horsens	171	(4)
2015–2017	SønderjyskE	44	(1)
2017–2018	Midtjylland	35	(0)
2018–2021	OB	74	(1)
2021–2023	Horsens	49	(0)
Total		373	(6)

International career
2007	Denmark U20	2	(0)
2008	Denmark U21	2	(0)

Managerial career
- 2023: Horsens (assistant)
- 2024–: Horsens (staff)
- * Club domestic league appearances and goals

Janus Mats Drachmann (born 11 May 1988) is a Danish former professional footballer who played as a midfielder.

Born in Frederikssund, Drachmann emerged from the AC Horsens academy in 2006, and grew into a key player in midfield for the club, as well as the team captain. Through his career, he played for SønderjyskE and Midtjylland, and OB, eventually returning to AC Horsens before his retirement in 2023. Drachmann was a youth international for Denmark, having gained caps for the under-20 and under-21 sides.

== Club career ==
=== Horsens ===
Drachmann came to AC Horsens as an 18-year-old in the summer of 2006, to complete his education, and at the same time develop as a player on the club's reserve team. Due to injury to teammate and Horsens star player Allan Søgaard, Drachmann grabbed the opportunity to be the starting defensive midfielder for the club during the 2007–08 Superliga season. Despite his young age he showed himself capable of playing at the highest level. During the next nine years, Drachmann made 171 league appearances for the club, in which he scored four goals, and grew into team captain.

=== SønderjyskE ===
Drachmann signed a two-year contract with SønderjyskE on 5 June 2015. He played there for two seasons, in which he made 44 league appearances and scored one goal.

=== Midtjylland ===
On 4 January 2017, was first announced that Drachmann would move to Midtjylland after the ongoing season, but on 29 January, he was set to move to the club Midtjylland immediately. He made his debut for the club on 7 March 2017 in a match against the third tier club Kjellerup IF in the Danish Cup, which Midtjylland won 3–0 with goals by Bruninho, Mikkel Duelund and Simon Kroon. He made his Superliga debut for the club on 19 March, when he started against Nordsjælland; a match which Midtjylland lost 1–2. He played a total of nine matches in his first half of the season at the club, all of which were from the start. However, he did not play the full 90 minutes against SønderjyskE and Nordsjælland, as he was replaced in the 75th minute for Gustav Wikheim (5–2 defeat away) and was sent off in the 73rd minute after two yellow cards (3–2 win away) by referee Mads-Kristoffer Kristoffersen.

=== OB ===
On 18 July 2018, it was announced that Drachmann had been signed by OB. He penned a four-year agreement, where he was also reunited with head coach Jakob Michelsen, who he had as coach at SønderjyskE. He already made his debut four days later when he started and played every 90 minutes in a 2–2 home draw against SønderjyskE.

=== Return to Horsens ===
Drachmann returned to Horsens on 11 June 2021, after the club had just suffered relegation to the second-tier Danish 1st Division. He helped the club return to the Superliga within one season, captaining the team and making 23 league appearances. At the end of the 2022–23 season, 35-year–old Drachmann announced his retirement from football.

== International career ==
In October 2007, Drachmann was selected for his first matches with the Denmark under-21 team. He has also appeared for the under-20 team.

== Coaching career ==
After retiring in August 2023, Drachmann joined the staff of AC Horsens as an assistant for the first team. In January 2024, Drachmann was moved into a new role as 'assistant transition coach and responsible for individual training at the academy'.

== Honours ==
Midtjylland

- Danish Superliga: 2017–18

Horsens

- Danish 1st Division: 2021–22
