= Paul Onuachu =

Nigerian footballer (born 1994)

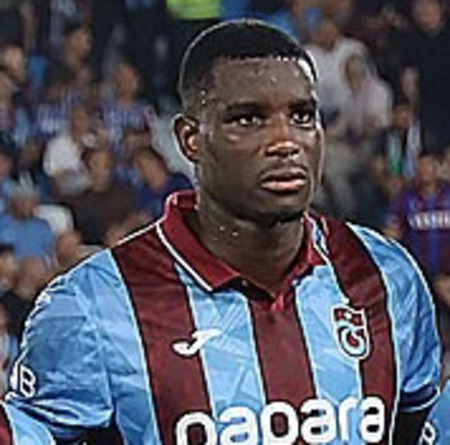
- Onuachu with Trabzonspor in 2025

Personal information
- Full name: Ebere Paul Onuachu
- Date of birth: 28 May 1994 (age 32)
- Place of birth: Owerri, Nigeria
- Height: 2.01 m (6 ft 7 in)
- Position: Striker

Team information
- Current team: Trabzonspor
- Number: 30

Youth career
- Ebedei
- 2012: Midtjylland

Senior career*
Years	Team	Apps	(Gls)
2012–2019	Midtjylland	134	(51)
2015	→ Vejle (loan)	13	(5)
2019–2023	Genk	114	(79)
2023–2025	Southampton	36	(4)
2023–2024	→ Trabzonspor (loan)	21	(15)
2025–	Trabzonspor	39	(24)

International career^{‡}
2019–	Nigeria	33	(5)
Medal record
Men's football
Representing Nigeria
Africa Cup of Nations
Runner-up	2023 Ivory Coast
Third place	2025 Morocco
- * Club domestic league appearances and goals as of 06:17, 13 November 2026 (UTC) ‡ National team caps and goals as of 23:07, 10 June 2026 (UTC)

Ebere Paul Onuachu MON (born 28 May 1994) is a Nigerian professional footballer who plays as a striker for Süper Lig club Trabzonspor and the Nigeria national team.

Onuachu has won league titles in Denmark and Belgium, and while in the latter country was voted Belgian Footballer of the Year and won the country's top scoring Golden Bull trophy.

== Club career ==
=== Midtjylland ===
Onuachu moved to Danish club FC Midtjylland in 2012 on a scholarship from their affiliate team in Nigeria, Ebedei. He was a prolific scorer for their youth team, and made his first-team debut in the Cup later that year, before making his league debut in December 2012. In June 2013 he signed a new three-year contract with the club, before extending it for a further three-years in August 2015. In early 2015 he was loaned to Vejle BK, before returning to FC Midtjylland ahead of the 2015–16 season.

Onuachu helped Midtjylland to the Danish Superliga title twice, in 2015 and 2018, and scored the winner against Manchester United in Midtjylland's home last-32 first-leg of the 2015–16 UEFA Europa League, but two goals from United debutant Marcus Rashford in the second-leg a week later at Old Trafford saw the English side win 5–1 on the night and 6–3 on aggregate.

=== Genk ===
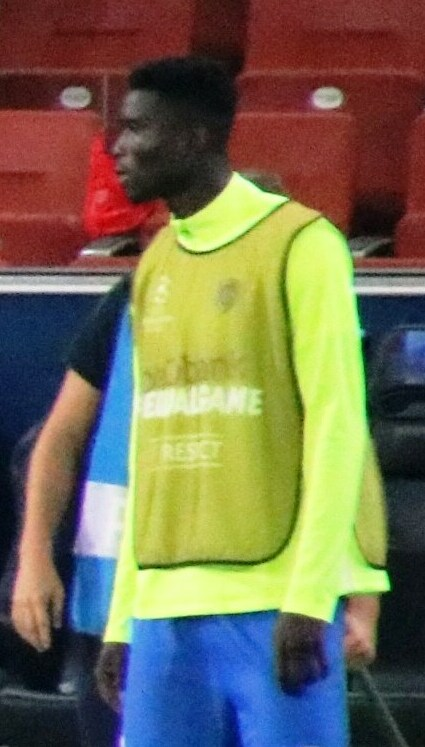
Onuachu training with Genk in 2019.

In August 2019 he signed for then reigning Belgian Pro League champions Genk, who had just appointed Felice Mazzù as coach. At 2.01m tall, Onuachu was seen as being an "atypical" transfer. Onauchu made his debut on 1 September 2019 as a late stoppage-time substitute in a 1–1 draw against Club Brugge, and would score in his next two league games, starting in both a 2–1 defeat against Sporting Charleroi and 3–1 win over Oostende.

Onuachu's second full season at Genk saw him finish top scorer with 33 league goals (35 in all competitions), winning him the Golden Bull for leading Belgian Pro League goalscorer, a feat that saw him named Pro League Player of the Year for 2020–21, and 2021 Belgian Golden Shoe winner for the best footballer of the calendar year. Onuachu also won the Ebony Shoe for best African player in Belgium for 2020–21.

Onuachu scored against all 17 league opponents, netting in four of the six Champions Play-off games, helping propel Genk to runners-up spot in the 2020–21 Belgian First Division A, and winning the 2021 Belgian Cup Final 2–1 against Standard Liege. His haul of 33 goals was the highest in the Belgian top flight since Erwin Vandenbergh's European Golden Boot-winning 39-goal campaign for Lierse in 1980, and broke Wesley Sonck's one-season Genk club goals record of 30, set in 2002–03.

The following season saw Genk's league form suffer due to early-season defensive frailty as Cup-winning coach John van den Brom was sacked mid-season and replaced by Bernd Storck. Genk reached the European play-offs, finishing behind Gent in the table, finishing sixth overall. Onuachu was third-highest scorer in the league for 2021–22 with 21 goals, behind Deniz Undav of Union Saint Gilloise on 26 and Michael Frey of Royal Antwerp on 24.

In scoring four goals against Sporting Charleroi on 4 November 2022, Onuachu became the first Genk player to achieve this feat since Sonck, in 2003. Onuachu scored 16 league goals for Genk up to the end of January 2023, with Racing ten points clear of Union Saint Gilloise at the top of the Belgian Pro League. After expressing frustration previously at being unable to secure a move to one of the five richest European leagues, Onuachu said at the start of January 2023 he was determined to help Genk stay top and win the title. Onuachu scored twice in his final game for Genk, a 4–0 win over bottom club Seraing, to once more propel him to top spot in the Pro League scoring charts, as finally a major bid was made for the Nigerian striker from a club in a major league.

=== Southampton ===
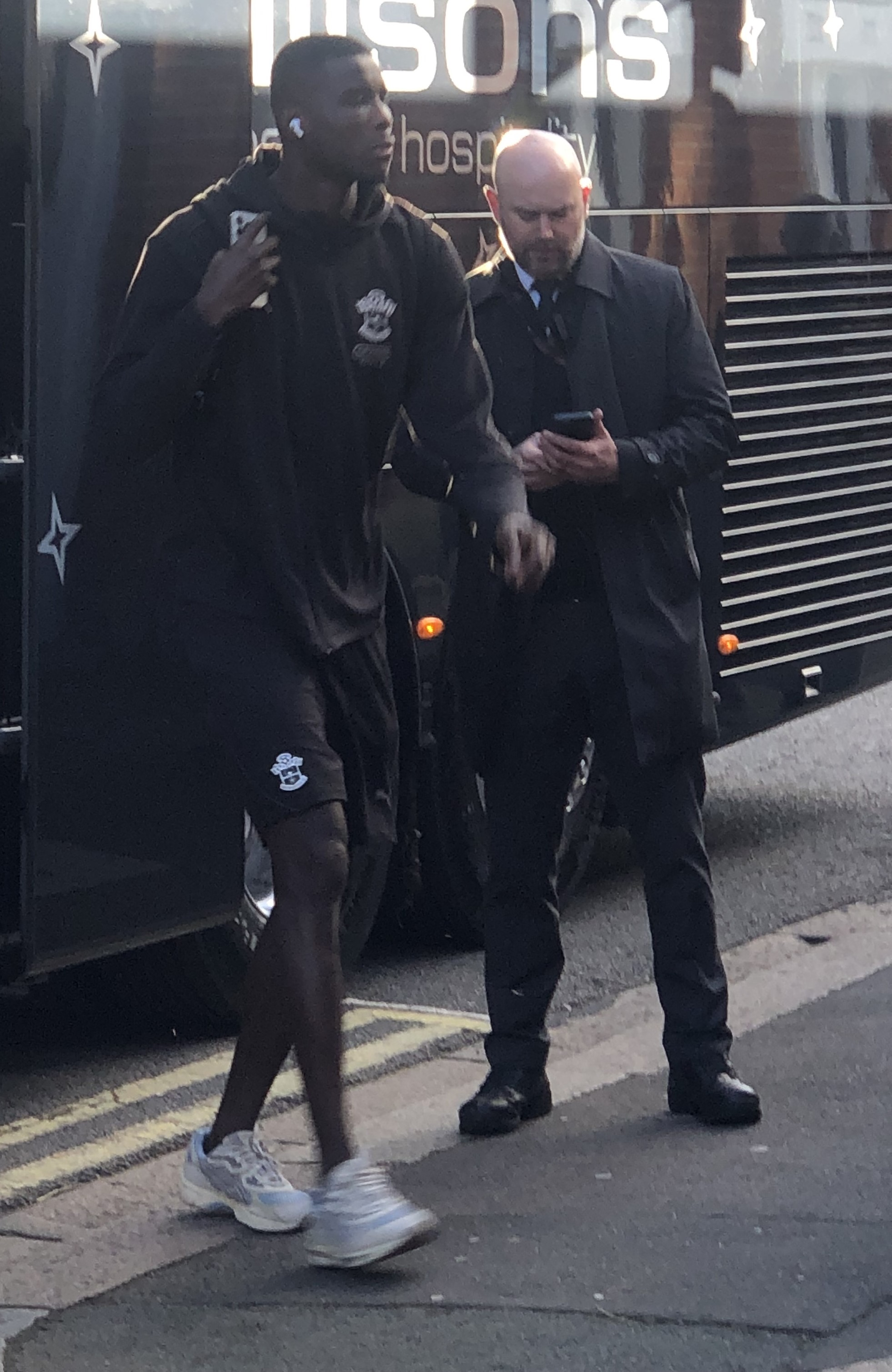
Onuachu in 2024

On 1 February 2023, Onuachu swapped title-chasing Genk for relegation-threatened Premier League club Southampton on a three-and-a-half-year contract. On 4 February 2023, Onuachu made his first Premier League appearance for Southampton in a 3–0 defeat against Brentford, replacing Mohamed Elyounoussi at half-time.

On 11 September 2023, Onuachu joined Trabzonspor on a season-long loan. He scored on his debut for the club on 17 September 2023 in a 3–0 victory against Beşiktaş. On 28 April 2024, Onuachu scored a hat-trick in a 4–2 victory against Gazientep.

Onuachu scored his first goal for Southampton on 19 January 2025 in a 3–2 Premier League defeat against Nottingham Forest.

=== Return to Trabzonspor ===
On 30 June 2025, a deal was agreed for Onuachu to transfer to Turkish club Trabzonspor. He ended his first season with the club on 22 goals, sharing the league's top scorer title with Eldor Shomurodov, and became the sixth player in the club's history to achieve the feat.

On 22 May 2026, Onuachu scored both goals for Trabzonspor in their 2–1 win over Konyaspor in the 2026 Turkish Cup final.

== International career ==
Onuachu was called up to the Nigeria under-23 national team in February 2015. In March 2019 he received his first call-up to the Nigerian senior team.

On 26 March 2019, Onuachu scored his first goal for Nigeria in a friendly match against Egypt. The goal was scored within the first ten seconds of the game, and the fastest ever scored for Nigeria. Following the goal Onuachu was heralded as the "toast of Nigerian football", with "his coach, team-mates, journalists and fans talking about him". He was selected to the Nigeria squad for the 2019 Africa Cup of Nations. He played in Nigeria's 1–0 win over Burundi, as the Super Eagles reached the semi-finals, losing 2–1 to Algeria in the last four, then beating Tunisia 1–0 in the bronze-medal match.

On 12 January 2024, he was called up to the Nigerian squad for the 2023 Africa Cup of Nations in Ivory Coast, replacing injured Umar Sadiq.

On 11 December 2025, Onuachu was called up to the Nigeria squad for the 2025 Africa Cup of Nations.

== Career statistics ==
=== Club ===
As of match played 8 November 2026

Appearances and goals by club, season and competition
Club	Season	League			National cup (Note: Includes Danish Cup, Belgian Cup, FA Cup, Turkish Cup)		League cup (Note: Includes EFL Cup)		Continental		Other		Total	
Club	Season	Division	Apps	Goals	Apps	Goals	Apps	Goals	Apps	Goals	Apps	Goals	Apps	Goals
Midtjylland	2012–13	Danish Superliga	1	0	1	0	—		—		—		2	0
Midtjylland	2013–14	Danish Superliga	11	0	1	0	—		—		—		12	0
Midtjylland	2014–15	Danish Superliga	10	1	2	2	—		2 (Note: Appearances in UEFA Europa League)	0	—		14	3
Midtjylland	2015–16	Danish Superliga	25	6	2	1	—		10 (Note: One appearance in UEFA Champions League, nine appearances and two goals in UEFA Europa League)	2	—		37	9
Midtjylland	2016–17	Danish Superliga	35	17	3	3	—		6	2	1 (Note: Appearance in Danish Superliga European play-off)	1	45	23
Midtjylland	2017–18	Danish Superliga	22	10	3	3	—		6	4	—		31	17
Midtjylland	2018–19	Danish Superliga	30	17	4	3	—		6 (Note: Two appearances in UEFA Champions League, four appearances and two goals in UEFA Europa League)	2	—		40	22
Midtjylland	Total		134	51	16	12	—		30	10	1	1	181	74
Vejle (loan)	2014–15	Danish 1st Division	13	5	0	0	—		—		—		13	5
Genk	2019–20	Belgian Pro League	22	9	1	1	—		5 (Note: Appearances in UEFA Champions League)	0	—		28	10
Genk	2020–21	Belgian Pro League	38	33	3	2	—		—		—		41	35
Genk	2021–22	Belgian Pro League	35	21	0	0	—		7 (Note: Two appearances and one goal in UEFA Champions League, five appearances and one goal in UEFA Europa League)	2	1 (Note: Appearance in Belgian Super Cup)	0	43	23
Genk	2022–23	Belgian Pro League	19	16	3	1	—		—		—		22	17
Genk	Total		114	79	7	4	—		12	2	1	0	134	85
Southampton	2022–23	Premier League	11	0	0	0	—		—		—		11	0
Southampton	2023–24	Championship	0	0	0	0	1	0	—		—		1	0
Southampton	2024–25	Premier League	25	4	1	0	2	0	—		—		28	4
Southampton	Total		36	4	1	0	3	0	—		—		40	4
Trabzonspor (loan)	2023–24	Süper Lig	21	15	4	2	—		—		—		25	17
Trabzonspor	2025–26	Süper Lig	30	22	6	4	—		—		0	0	36	26
Trabzonspor	2026–27	Süper Lig	9	2	0	0	—		4 (Note: Two appearances in UEFA Europa League, two appearance in UEFA Conference League)	1	0	0	13	3
Trabzonspor	Total		39	24	6	4	—		4	1	0	0	49	29
Career total			357	177	34	22	3	0	46	13	2	1	442	214

=== International ===
As of match played 10 June 2026

Appearances and goals by national team and year
National team	Year	Apps	Goals
Nigeria	2019	7	1
Nigeria	2020	2	0
Nigeria	2021	7	2
Nigeria	2022	1	0
Nigeria	2023	1	0
Nigeria	2024	6	0
Nigeria	2025	3	1
Nigeria	2026	6	1
Total		33	5

Scores and results list Nigeria's goal tally first, score column indicates score after each Onuachu goal.

List of international goals scored by Paul Onuachu
No.	Date	Venue	Opponent	Score	Result	Competition
1	26 March 2019	Stephen Keshi Stadium, Asaba, Nigeria	Egypt	1–0	1–0	Friendly
2	27 March 2021	Stade Charles de Gaulle, Porto-Novo, Benin	Benin	1–0	1–0	2021 Africa Cup of Nations qualification
3	30 March 2021	Teslim Balogun Stadium, Lagos, Nigeria	Lesotho	3–0	3–0	2021 Africa Cup of Nations qualification
4	30 December 2025	Fez Stadium, Fez, Morocco	Uganda	1–0	3–1	2025 Africa Cup of Nations
5	3 June 2026	Stadion Narodowy, Warsaw, Poland	Poland	2–1	2–2	Friendly

== Honours ==
Midtjylland

- Danish Superliga: 2014–15, 2017–18
- Danish Cup: 2018–19

Genk

- Belgian Cup: 2020–21

Trabzonspor

- Turkish Cup: 2025–26

Nigeria

- Africa Cup of Nations runner-up: 2023; third place: 2019, 2025

Individual

- Belgian Pro League top goalscorer: 2020–21
- Belgian Professional Footballer of the Year: 2020–21
- Belgian Golden Shoe: 2021
- Belgian Pro League Team of the Year: 2020–21
- Ebony Shoe: 2021
- Süper Lig top goalscorer: 2025–26 (joint)

Orders

- Member of the Order of the Niger
