= André Rømer =

Danish footballer (born 1993)

Personal information
- Full name: André Ibsen Rømer
- Date of birth: 18 July 1993 (age 33)
- Place of birth: Køge, Denmark
- Height: 1.86 m (6 ft 1 in)
- Position: Defensive midfielder

Team information
- Current team: KA
- Number: 6

Youth career
- –2008: Køge
- 2008–2012: Midtjylland

Senior career*
Years	Team	Apps	(Gls)
2012–2018	Midtjylland	119	(6)
2018	OB	11	(0)
2018–2021	Randers	75	(11)
2021–2023	IF Elfsborg	68	(3)
2023–2024	Midtjylland	27	(0)
2024–2026	Randers	49	(1)
2026–	KA	13	(2)

International career
2009	Denmark U-16	3	(0)
2010	Denmark U-18	2	(0)
2012	Denmark U-20	4	(0)
- * Club domestic league appearances and goals as of 16 November 2026

André Ibsen Rømer (born 18 July 1993) is a Danish professional footballer who plays as a defensive midfielder for Besta deild karla club KA.

== Career ==
=== Midtjylland ===
Rømer started playing football for Køge Boldklub alongside his brother Marcel, before moving to the FC Midtjylland academy as a 15-year-old. In March 2012, Rømer signed a five-year contract with Midtjylland, and he was permanently promoted to the first team. He made his debut on 26 September 2012 in a 1–0 win over Rishøj Boldklub in the Danish Cup. Rømer made his Danish Superliga debut on 9 December 2012 in a 2–0 win over AC Horsens, where he came on as a substitute in the 90th minute for Petter Andersson. In total, Rømer made seven league appearances and played one cup match during the 2012–13 season. At the end of the season, he was also named "Newcomer of the Year" in Midtjylland.

Rømer scored his first goal on 18 April 2014 in a 4–0 win over AGF, after coming on as a substitute in the 85th minute. He played a total of 22 league matches and scored one goal, with an additional two cup appearances during the 2013–14 season. In October 2014, Rømer extended his contract with Midtjylland until the summer of 2019. He played 28 competitive matches and scored a goal during the 2014–15 season when Midtjylland became league champions. During the season, Rømer made his UEFA Europa League debut in the play-off round against Greek club Panathinaikos.

In the 2015–16 season, Rømer played 41 competitive matches and scored one goal. He played in the qualifying rounds for the UEFA Champions League and in the Europa League, where Midtjylland reached the round of 16 before they were knocked out by Manchester United. In September 2016, Rømer extended his contract with Midtjylland until 2021. In the 2016–17 season, he played 41 competitive matches and scored three goals. During the autumn of the 2017–18 season, Rømer played 11 competitive matches.

=== OB ===
On 4 January 2018, Rømer signed a three-and-a-half-year contract with league rivals OB. Rømer made his debut on 16 February 2018 in a 1–2 loss against FC Nordsjælland. He played 11 matches for the club during the 2017–18 season.

=== Randers ===
On 19 July 2018, Rømer moved to Randers FC on a three-year deal. Rømer played 35 competitive matches and scored five goals during the 2018–19 season. The following season, he played 34 competitive games and scored two goals. In the first six months of the 2020–21 season, before leaving the club, Rømer played 19 competitive matches and scored four goals.

=== IF Elfsborg ===
On 30 January 2021, Rømer signed a four-year contract with Swedish Allsvenskan club IF Elfsborg, where he signed a four-year contract starting 22 February. Rømer made his debut on 28 February 2021 in a 4–1 win over Utsiktens BK in the Swedish Cup, where he played alongside fellow Danes Jeppe Okkels and Frederik Holst.

=== Return to Midtjylland ===
On 15 July 2023 it was confirmed, that Rømer had returned to his former club, Midtjylland, on a deal until June 2026.

=== Randers FC ===
On August 22, 2024, Danish Superliga club Randers FC confirmed that Rømer returned to the club on a deal until June 2026.

== Career statistics ==
As of match played 26 May 2024

Appearances and goals by club, season and competition
Club	Season	League			National cup (Note: Includes Danish Cup, Svenska Cupen)		Europe		Other		Total	
Club	Season	Division	Apps	Goals	Apps	Goals	Apps	Goals	Apps	Goals	Apps	Goals
Midtjylland	2012–13	Danish Superliga	7	0	1	0	0	0	—		8	0
Midtjylland	2013–14	Danish Superliga	22	1	2	0	—		—		24	1
Midtjylland	2014–15	Danish Superliga	25	1	2	0	1 (Note: Appearances in UEFA Europa League)	0	—		28	1
Midtjylland	2015–16	Danish Superliga	28	1	1	0	12 (Note: Three appearances in UEFA Champions League, nine appearances in UEFA Europa League)	0	—		41	1
Midtjylland	2016–17	Danish Superliga	31	3	3	0	6	0	1 (Note: Appearances in Danish Superliga European play-offs)	0	41	3
Midtjylland	2017–18	Danish Superliga	6	0	1	0	4	0	—		11	0
Midtjylland	Total		119	6	10	0	23	0	1	0	153	6
OB	2017–18	Danish Superliga	11	0	—		—		1	0	12	0
Randers	2018–19	Danish Superliga	31	5	2	0	—		2	0	35	5
Randers	2019–20	Danish Superliga	29	2	3	0	—		2	0	34	2
Randers	2020–21	Danish Superliga	15	4	4	0	—		—		19	4
Randers	Total		75	11	9	0	—		4	0	88	11
IF Elfsborg	2021	Allsvenskan	27	1	2	0	6 (Note: Appearances in UEFA Europa Conference League)	0	—		35	1
IF Elfsborg	2022	Allsvenskan	25	1	6	1	2	0	—		33	2
IF Elfsborg	2023	Allsvenskan	16	1	1	0	—		—		33	2
IF Elfsborg	Total		68	3	9	1	8	0	—		85	4
Midtjylland	2023–24	Danish Superliga	23	0	3	1	1	0	—		27	1
Career total			296	20	30	1	31	0	6	0	363	21

== Honours ==
Midtjylland

- Danish Superliga: 2014–15, 2023–24

Individual

- Danish Superliga Player of the Month: November 2024
