= Rasmus Kristensen =

Danish footballer (born 1997)

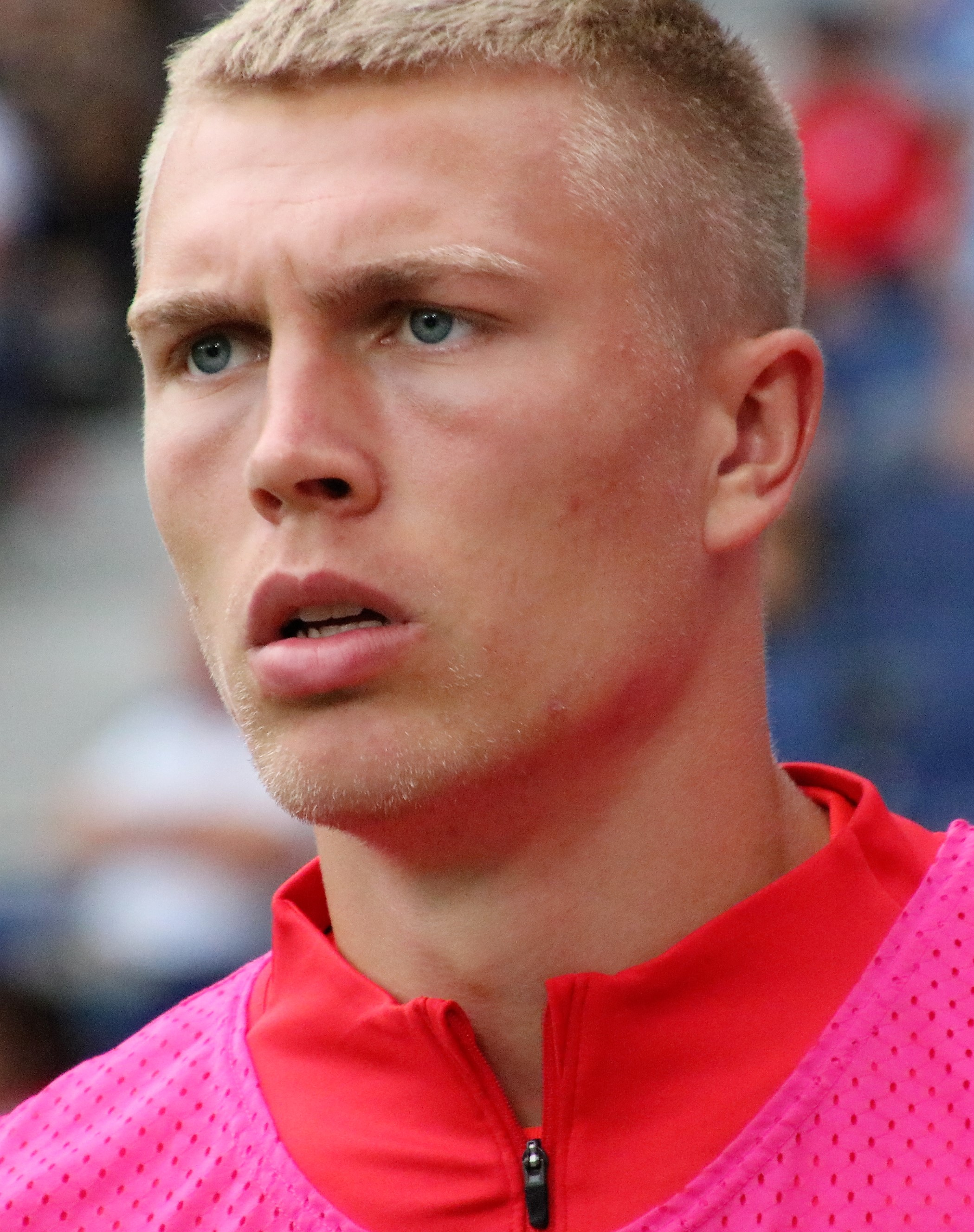
- Kristensen in 2019

Personal information
- Full name: Rasmus Nissen Kristensen
- Date of birth: 11 July 1997 (age 29)
- Place of birth: Brande, Denmark
- Height: 1.87 m (6 ft 2 in)
- Position: Right-back

Team information
- Current team: Midtjylland

Youth career
- 2003–2010: Brande IF
- 2010–2012: Herning Fremad
- 2012–2016: Midtjylland

Senior career*
Years	Team	Apps	(Gls)
2016–2018	Midtjylland	63	(6)
2018	Jong Ajax	2	(0)
2018–2019	Ajax	20	(1)
2019–2022	Red Bull Salzburg	72	(10)
2022–2025	Leeds United	26	(3)
2023–2024	→ Roma (loan)	29	(1)
2024–2025	→ Eintracht Frankfurt (loan)	30	(5)
2025–2026	Eintracht Frankfurt	22	(2)
2026–	Midtjylland	10	(2)

International career^{‡}
2015	Denmark U18	5	(1)
2015–2016	Denmark U19	13	(2)
2016	Denmark U20	1	(0)
2016–2019	Denmark U21	26	(7)
2021–	Denmark	39	(2)
- * Club domestic league appearances and goals as of 21:00, 19 October 2026 (UTC) ‡ National team caps and goals as of 17 November 2026

Rasmus Nissen Kristensen (Danish pronunciation: [ˈʁɑsmus ˈne̝sn̩ ˈkʰʁestn̩sn̩, - ˈkʰʁæs-]; born 11 July 1997) is a Danish professional footballer who plays as a right-back for Midtjylland and the Denmark national team.

== Youth career ==
Kristensen was born to a footballing family and began playing football in Brande IF when he was six years old. He played in the club for six years, before joining Herning Fremad where he played for two years. In 2012, Kristensen signed a youth contract with FC Midtjylland.

== Club career ==
=== FC Midtjylland ===
Kristensen was promoted to the first team squad in summer 2016 at the age of 18 and signed a five-year professional contract.

At the age of 18, Kristensen got his official debut for FCM on 7 March 2016, in a Superliga match against FC Nordsjælland. He started on the bench, but replaced Václav Kadlec in the 39th minute in a match, which FCM lost 1–2. He turned into a key player for the team in the 2016–17 season.

=== Ajax ===
On 23 January 2018, Kristensen joined Ajax on a four-and-a-half-year contract.

=== RB Salzburg ===
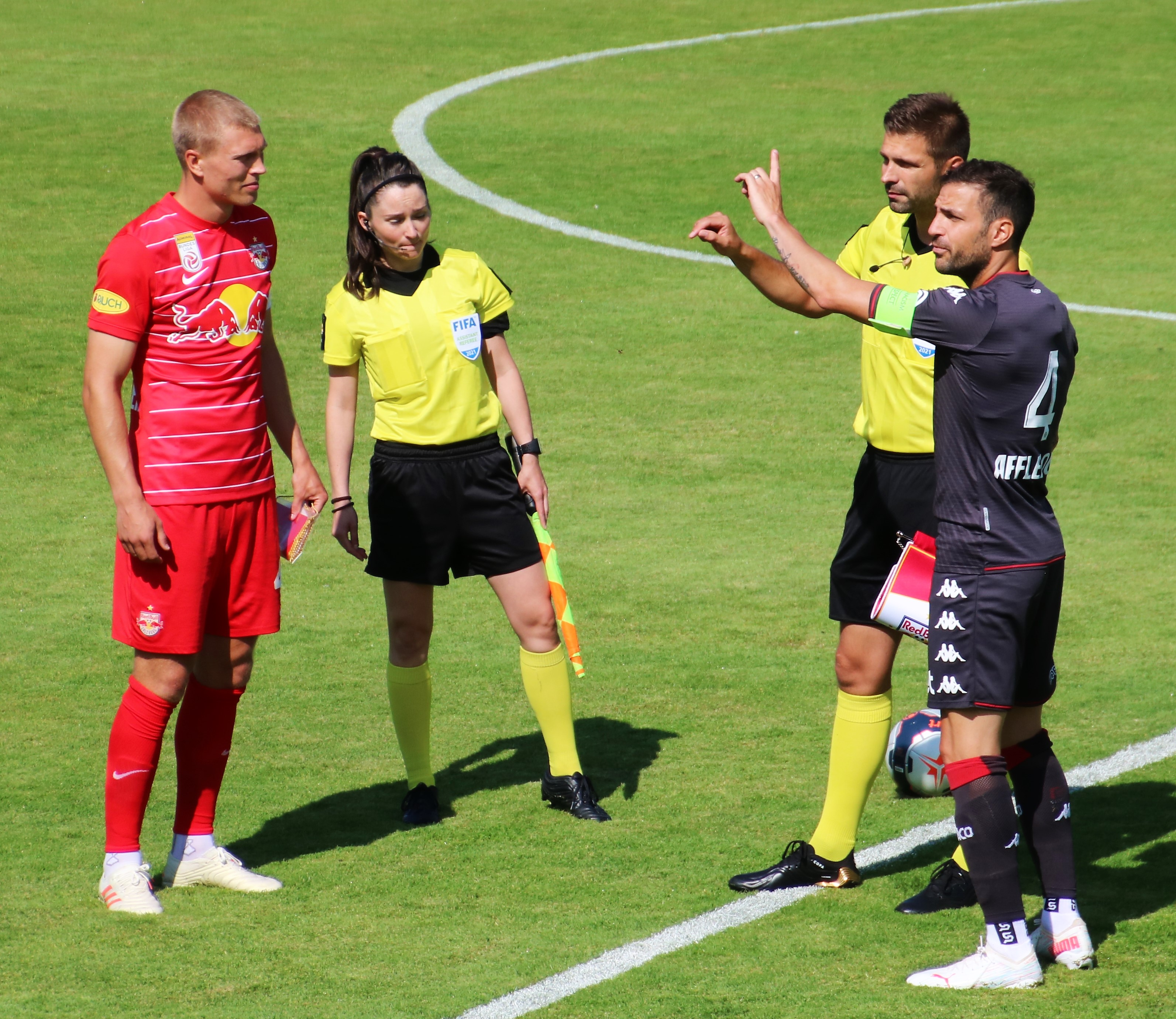
Nissen (furthest left) as team captain for Salzburg in a pre-season friendly against AS Monaco in July 2021.

After one and a half years with Ajax, Kristensen moved to Austria and joined Austrian Football Bundesliga club FC Red Bull Salzburg on a five-year contract.

=== Leeds United ===
On 8 June 2022, Kristensen joined Premier League club Leeds United on a five-year contract for an undisclosed fee in the region of £10 million. He joined the team from 1 July 2022, and became Leeds's second confirmed arrival of the summer transfer window, reuniting with former Salzburg teammate Brenden Aaronson. He made his senior league debut for Leeds as part of the starting eleven in their season opener on 6 August with a 2–1 home win over Wolverhampton Wanderers. On 18 March 2023, he scored seconds after coming on as a substitute in Leeds' 4–2 win at Molineux against Wolverhampton Wanderers.

==== Loan to AS Roma ====
On 14 July 2023, Kristensen joined Serie A club AS Roma on a season long loan. He made his Serie A debut a month later, on 20 August, in a 2–2 draw with Salernitana. Later that year, on 3 December, he scored his first goal and provided an assist in a 2–1 away win over Sassuolo.

=== Eintracht Frankfurt ===
On 19 July 2024, Kristensen signed for Bundesliga club Eintracht Frankfurt on loan with a purchase option worth €15 million. He scored his first Bundesliga goal on 21 December in a 3–1 defeat against Mainz. On 16 April 2025, it was announced that Kristensen will move to the club on a permanent contract when the summer 2025 transfer window opened. Later that year, on 22 October, he scored his first UEFA Champions League goal, opening the scoring in a 5–1 defeat against Liverpool.

=== Return to FC Midtjylland ===
On 30 June 2026, Kristensen returned to Midtjylland with a five-year contract.

== International career ==
In November 2020, he was called up to Kasper Hjulmand's senior squad due to several cancellations from, among others, the Danish national team players playing in England, due to the COVID-19 restrictions, as well as a case of COVID-19 in the squad, which had put several national team players in quarantine.

He made his debut for the Denmark national football team on 4 September 2021 in a World Cup qualifier against the Faroe Islands, a 1–0 away victory. He started the game and was substituted at half-time.

== Personal life ==
Kristensen is the nephew of the former Sturm Graz player Sigurd Kristensen and is the cousin of Leon Jessen. His sister Naja is a professional handball player.

== Career statistics ==
=== Club ===
As of match played 19 October 2026

Appearances and goals by club, season and competition
Club	Season	League			National cup (Note: Includes Danish Cup, KNVB Cup, Austrian Cup, FA Cup, Coppa Italia, DFB-Pokal)		Europe		Total	
Club	Season	Division	Apps	Goals	Apps	Goals	Apps	Goals	Apps	Goals
Midtjylland	2015–16	Danish Superliga	12	1	0	0	0	0	12	1
Midtjylland	2016–17	Danish Superliga	34	2	4	0	8 (Note: Appearances in UEFA Europa League)	0	46	2
Midtjylland	2017–18	Danish Superliga	17	3	0	0	7	1	24	4
Midtjylland	Total		63	6	4	0	15	1	82	7
Jong Ajax	2017–18	Eerste Divisie	2	0	—		—		2	0
Ajax	2017–18	Eredivisie	8	0	0	0	0	0	8	0
Ajax	2018–19	Eredivisie	12	0	5	1	2 (Note: Appearances in UEFA Champions League)	0	19	1
Ajax	Total		20	0	5	1	2	0	27	1
Red Bull Salzburg	2019–20	Austrian Bundesliga	12	0	2	0	6	0	20	0
Red Bull Salzburg	2020–21	Austrian Bundesliga	31	3	5	1	8 (Note: Six appearances in UEFA Champions League, two appearances in UEFA Europa League)	0	44	4
Red Bull Salzburg	2021–22	Austrian Bundesliga	29	7	6	3	10	0	45	10
Red Bull Salzburg	Total		72	10	13	4	24	0	109	14
Leeds United	2022–23	Premier League	26	3	4	0	—		30	3
Roma (loan)	2023–24	Serie A	29	1	2	0	0	0	31	1
Eintracht Frankfurt (loan)	2024–25	Bundesliga	30	5	2	0	11	1	43	6
Eintracht Frankfurt	2025–26	Bundesliga	22	2	2	0	4	1	28	3
Midtjylland	2026–27	Danish Superliga	10	2	0	0	7 (Note: Two appearances in UEFA Europa League, five appearances in UEFA Conference League)	0	17	2
Career total			274	29	32	5	63	3	369	37

=== International ===
As of match played 17 November 2026

Appearances and goals by national team and year
National team	Year	Apps	Goals
Denmark	2021	2	0
Denmark	2022	11	0
Denmark	2023	7	0
Denmark	2024	4	0
Denmark	2025	8	2
Denmark	2026	7	0
Total		39	2

Scores and results list Denmark's goal tally first.

List of international goals scored by Rasmus Kristensen
No.	Date	Cap	Venue	Opponent	Score	Result	Competition
1	23 March 2025	26	Estádio José Alvalade, Lisbon, Portugal	Portugal	1–1	2–5 (a.e.t.)	2024–25 UEFA Nations League A
2	10 June 2025	28	Nature Energy Park, Odense, Denmark	Lithuania	4–0	5–0	Friendly

== Honours ==
Ajax

- Eredivisie: 2018–19
- KNVB Cup: 2018–19

Red Bull Salzburg

- Austrian Bundesliga: 2019–20, 2020–21, 2021–22
- Austrian Cup: 2019–20, 2020–21, 2021–22

Individual

- Austrian Bundesliga Team of the Year: 2020–21, 2021–22
