= Mads Døhr Thychosen =

Danish footballer (born 1997)

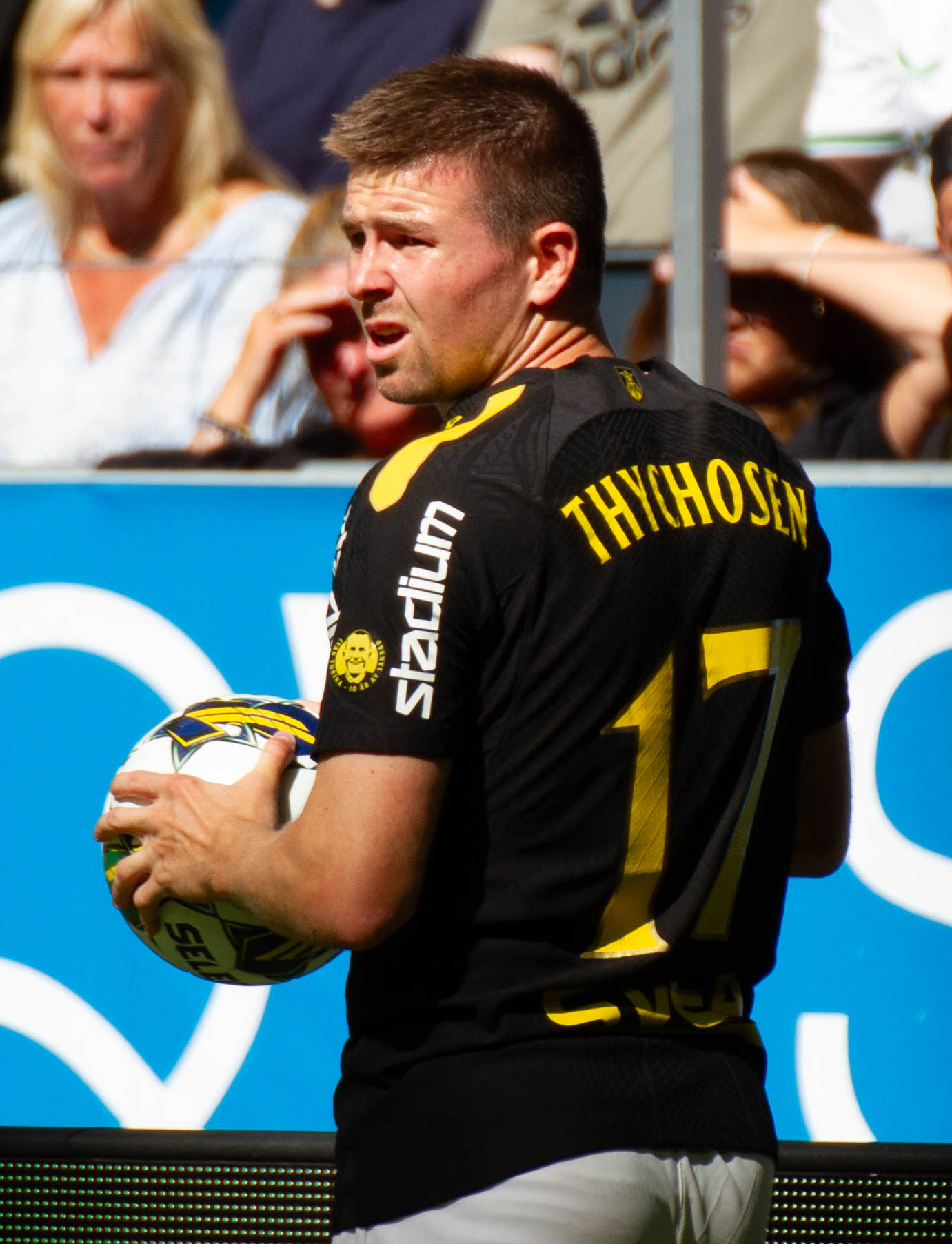

Personal information
- Full name: Mads Døhr Thychosen
- Date of birth: 27 June 1997 (age 29)
- Place of birth: Vejle‚ Denmark
- Height: 1.78 m (5 ft 10 in)
- Position: Right-back

Team information
- Current team: AIK
- Number: 17

Youth career
- 2000–2008: Vinding SF
- 2008–2010: Vejle BK
- 2010–2011: Vinding SF
- 2011–2014: Vejle BK
- 2014–2016: Midtjylland

Senior career*
Years	Team	Apps	(Gls)
2013–2014	Vejle	2	(0)
2015–2019	Midtjylland	31	(3)
2017	→ Horsens (loan)	17	(0)
2019–2022	Nordsjælland	71	(3)
2022–2023	Midtjylland	33	(2)
2023–	AIK	75	(6)

International career
2012–2013	Denmark U-16	8	(4)
2013	Denmark U-17	10	(0)
2014–2015	Denmark U-18	5	(0)
2015–2016	Denmark U-19	13	(3)
2017	Denmark U-20	4	(1)
2018–2019	Denmark U-21	3	(0)
- * Club domestic league appearances and goals as of 8 July 2026

Mads Døhr Thychosen (Danish pronunciation: [ˈmæs tɶɐ̯ ˈtsʰykʰosn̩]; born 27 June 1997) is a Danish footballer who plays as a right-back for AIK.

== Youth career ==
Thychosen started playing football when he was two and a half years old in the amateur club Vinding SF. Then, when he was 11 years old, he transferred to Vejle Boldklub, and played there until he was 13, when he moved back to Vinding. One year later, he went back to Vejle at the age of 14.

He was one of the biggest talents ever in Vejle, and played with the youth team of Arsenal at the Ferolli Cup. After that, he trained with them once again in December 2013.

He signed his first contract with Vejle on his 15th birthday.

== Club career ==
=== Vejle Boldklub ===
At the age of only 16, 3 months and 9 days, Thychosen became the youngest debutant ever for Vejle BK, when he replaced Nicolaj Agger in the 82nd minute, in the 2–0 victory against Hvidovre IF on 6 October 2013.

=== FC Midtjylland ===
On 25 August 2014, FC Midtjylland signed Thychosen for their U19 squad on a 3-year contract.

At the age of 18, Thychosen got his official debut for FCM on 25 October 2015, in a Superliga match against Brøndby IF. Thychosen started on the bench, but replaced Marco Larsen in the 82nd minute in the match that FCM lost 1–2. The player signed a new 5-year contract in September 2016. FCM wanted to loan him out in the winter 2017, however, he stayed at the club. But after playing no games since November 2016, it was clear that he had to leave the club in the summer of 2017.

On 25 January 2018, Thychosen signed a contract extension.

==== Loan to AC Horsens ====
AC Horsens invited Thychosen on a one-week trial in June 2017 and two weeks later the club announced, that they had signed the winger on a loan deal until 31 December 2017.

=== FC Nordsjælland ===
On 8 August 2019 FC Nordsjælland announced, that they had signed Thychosen on a 4-year deal.

=== Return to Midtjylland ===
On 31 January 2022, Tychosen returned to his former club FC Midtjylland on a deal until June 2025.

=== AIK ===
After 1,5 years at Midjylland, Tychosen moved to Swedish club AIK on 30 June 2023, signing a deal until the end of 2025. On 8 July Tychosen scored a debut-goal against BK Häcken in a 2–1-lost at Friends Arena. On 10 January 2025 it was announced that Thychosen had extended his contract until 31 December 2027.

== Personal life ==
Thychosen's father Lars Døhr, uncles Steen Thychosen and Ulrich Thychosen, and cousins Oliver Thychosen and Jacob Thychosen are all former footballers. His younger brother Kasper is a lower-league footballer.

His favourite player is Wayne Rooney and his favourite team is Manchester United.

== Honours ==
FC Midtjylland:

- Danish Superliga: 2017–18
- Danish Cup: 2018–19
