= Mikkel Duelund =

Danish footballer (born 1997)

Personal information
- Full name: Mikkel Duelund Poulsen
- Date of birth: 29 June 1997 (age 29)
- Place of birth: Aarhus, Denmark
- Height: 1.78 m (5 ft 10 in)
- Position: Midfielder

Team information
- Current team: Vejle
- Number: 10

Youth career
- 1999–200?: Virup IF
- 200?–200?: VRI
- 200?–2005: HEI
- 2005–2008: Skovbakken
- 2008–2011: AGF
- 2011–2014: Midtjylland

Senior career*
Years	Team	Apps	(Gls)
2014–2018	Midtjylland	90	(21)
2018–2024	Dynamo Kyiv	21	(1)
2021–2023	→ NEC (loan)	37	(3)
2023–2024	→ AGF (loan)	29	(3)
2024–2025	AGF	7	(0)
2025–	Vejle	25	(8)

International career^{‡}
2012	Denmark U16	1	(0)
2013–2014	Denmark U17	4	(1)
2014–2015	Denmark U18	3	(3)
2015–2016	Denmark U19	13	(10)
2016–2019	Denmark U21	24	(6)
2018	Denmark League XI	1	(0)
- * Club domestic league appearances and goals as of 19 May 2026 ‡ National team caps and goals as of 22 October 2017

Mikkel Duelund Poulsen (born 29 June 1997) is a Danish professional footballer who plays as a midfielder for Danish Superliga club Vejle Boldklub.

== Club career ==
=== Early career ===
Duelund was born in Aarhus and started playing football at the age of two in Virup IF. From the time he was two years old, until he was eight years old, he played first for Vejlby-Risskov Idrætsklub (VRI) and then for Hjortshøj-Egaa Idrætsforening (HEI). At the age of eight, he moved to IK Skovbakken, where he played for three years.

At the age of 11, Duelund joined the AGF academy; the most renowned in the city. He subsequently had offers from several other clubs, but at the age of 14 he chose to move to FC Midtjylland.

=== Midtjylland ===
Duelund began his professional career with Danish Superliga side FC Midtjylland. In 2013, he took part in a trial with Eredivisie club PSV Eindhoven but ultimately remained with Midtjylland's youth team. During his time with the U19 group, Duelund won the Top Goalscorer and Player of the Season awards as the side were crowned Danish champions. In 2014, he was named by The Guardian as one of 40 best young talents in World Football.

Following his form at youth level Duelund was promoted to the first-team, making his league debut in March 2015 against Hobro IK, coming on as a second-half substitute for Petter Andersson. By the end of his debut season he had helped the club to its first ever Superliga title. As a result of his showings in 2015 Duelund won the DBU U19 talent of the year-award.

In the year that followed he made a goalscoring debut in the Champions League against Lincoln Red Imps before later debuting in the Europa League against Napoli. In 2016–17, he became the seventh youngest player ever to score 10 career league goals in the Superliga.

In March 2018, Duelund made his 100th appearance for Midtjylland and marked the occasion with a goal in a 2–1 win over Silkeborg. The club ultimately went on to reclaim the Superliga title, ending ahead of rivals Brøndby.

=== Dynamo Kyiv ===
On 31 August 2018, Duelund signed a contract with Ukrainian club Dynamo Kyiv. He made his debut for the club on 16 September in a 1–1 away draw against Zorya Luhansk, coming on as a substitute in the 59th minute for Volodymyr Shepelyev. In his third game, he scored his first goal for the club – the game-winner in a 1–0 away win over Arsenal Kyiv.

However, he would only play sporadically. Within two months of his move, he suffered an ankle fracture which meant that he barely made any appearances for over a year and a half. After recovering in February 2020, he mostly appeared as a substitute. During the 2020–21 season, Duelund made only four league appearances, of which one was in the starting lineup. In November 2020, Duelund was one of multiple Dynamo players infected with SARS‑CoV‑2 during the COVID-19 pandemic.

==== NEC (loan) ====
On 22 June 2021, recently promoted Dutch Eredivisie club NEC Nijmegen announced that they had signed Duelund on a one-season loan from Dynamo Kyiv with an option to buy. He made his debut on 14 August in a 5–0 loss to defending champions Ajax.

On 5 August 2022, the loan was extended by another season. He started the 2022–23 season in convincing fashion, scoring once and adding two assists on the second matchday in a 4–1 victory against FC Volendam.

On 29 January 2023 NEC confirmed, that Duelund's contract had been terminated by mutual agreement.

=== AGF (loan) ===
Later on the same day which Duelund left NEC Nijmegen, Danish Superliga club AGF confirmed that Duelund had returned to the club, which he played for as a youth player, on a loan deal for the rest of the season.

=== Vejle BK ===
On 17 June 2025 it was confirmed, that Dueland had joined Vejle Boldklub on a deal until June 2027.

== International career ==
In June 2017, Duelund was one of two 19-year-olds named in Denmark's squad for the UEFA European Under-21 Championship in Poland. He featured twice at the tournament, including a start in a 3–0 loss to eventual champions Germany, before Denmark were eliminated during the group stages. He got his debut for the Denmark League XI side in a friendly against Jordan on 15 January 2018, where he scored one goal in Denmark's 2–3 loss.

== Personal life ==
In February 2016, ahead of the Midtjylland's Europa League game against Manchester United, Duelund stated he was a lifelong fan of the Premier League club and named Wayne Rooney as his footballing idol.

== Career statistics ==
=== Club ===
As of match played 13 March 2023

Appearances and goals by club, season and competition
Club	Season	League			Cup (Note: Includes Danish Cup, Ukrainian Cup and KNVB Cup)		Continental (Note: Includes both UEFA Champions League and Europa League)		Other		Total	
Club	Season	League	Apps	Goals	Apps	Goals	Apps	Goals	Apps	Goals	Apps	Goals
Midtjylland	2014–15	Danish Superliga	7	0	2	0	0	0	0	0	9	0
Midtjylland	2015–16	Danish Superliga	22	5	1	1	2	1	0	0	25	7
Midtjylland	2016–17	Danish Superliga	33	8	4	2	7	0	0	0	44	10
Midtjylland	2017–18	Danish Superliga	28	8	4	1	3	0	0	0	35	9
Midtjylland	2018–19	Danish Superliga	5	0	0	0	2	0	—		7	0
Midtjylland	Total		95	21	11	4	14	1	0	0	120	26
Dynamo Kyiv	2018–19	Ukrainian Premier League	9	1	1	0	3	0	0	0	13	1
Dynamo Kyiv	2019–20	Ukrainian Premier League	8	0	1	2	0	0	0	0	9	2
Dynamo Kyiv	2020–21	Ukrainian Premier League	4	0	0	0	0	0	0	0	4	0
Dynamo Kyiv	Total		21	1	2	2	3	0	0	0	26	3
NEC (loan)	2021–22	Eredivisie	22	2	3	1	—		—		25	3
NEC (loan)	2022–23	Eredivisie	15	1	1	0	—		—		16	1
NEC (loan)	Total		37	3	4	1	—		—		41	4
Aarhus GF (loan)	2022–23	Danish Superliga	3	1	0	0	0	0	0	0	3	1
Career total			156	26	17	7	17	1	0	0	190	34

== Honours ==
Midtjylland

- Danish Superliga: 2014–15, 2017–18

Dynamo Kyiv

- Ukrainian Premier League: 2020–21
- Ukrainian Cup: 2019–20, 2020–21
- Ukrainian Super Cup: 2019, 2020
