= Kristian Riis =

Danish footballer (born 1997)

Personal information
- Full name: Kristian Dirks Riis
- Date of birth: 17 February 1997 (age 29)
- Place of birth: Haderslev‚ Denmark
- Height: 1.89 m (6 ft 2 in)
- Position: Centre-back

Team information
- Current team: Midtjylland (academy coach)

Youth career
- Haderslev FK
- –2011: SønderjyskE
- 2011–2016: Midtjylland

Senior career*
Years	Team	Apps	(Gls)
2016–2021	Midtjylland	17	(0)
2017–2018	→ Vendsyssel (loan)	23	(1)
2018–2019	→ Esbjerg (loan)	1	(0)
2021–2023	Lyngby	33	(2)
2023	Stjarnan	0	(0)
Total		74	(3)

International career
2013–2014	Denmark U17	7	(0)
2017	Denmark U20	2	(0)

Managerial career
- 2024–: Midtjylland (academy)
- * Club domestic league appearances and goals

Kristian Dirks Riis (born 17 February 1997) is a Danish former professional footballer who played as a centre-back.

== Club career ==
=== Early career ===
Riis began his career at Haderslev FK before moving to SønderjyskE. In 2011, at the age of 15, he joined Midtjylland's academy. Starting with their under-17 team, he progressed to the under-19s before making it to the first team squad in 2016.

=== Midtjylland ===
Riis was promoted to Midtjylland's first-team squad in the summer 2016 at the age of 19, signing a five-year professional contract on 14 June 2016.

Riis made his official debut for Midtjylland at the age of 19 on 31 July 2016, in a Danish Superliga match against Silkeborg IF. Riis played the whole match, which his club won 3–0.

After unexpectedly earning a spot to represent the Danish under-21s in early April 2017, Riis encountered a setback when he sustained a knee injury, sidelining him for 4 to 5 weeks.

==== Loan to Vendsyssel ====
On 31 August 2017, Riis was loaned out to the Danish 1st Division club Vendsyssel FF for the rest of the season. During his time at the club, he played a big role in Vendsyssel FF's promotion to the 2018–19 Danish Superliga. He played a total of 26 games for the club and scored one goal.

==== Loan to Esbjerg ====
On 21 August 2018, Esbjerg fB announced the signing of Riis on a loan deal for the rest of the season.

After an injury plagued time at the club with only one game played, Midtjylland decided to recall him on 25 March 2019.

=== Lyngby ===
After having only played nine minutes of football throughout the 2020–21 season at Midtjylland, Riis left the club and instead joined newly relegated Danish 1st Division club, Lyngby Boldklub, on 1 July 2021. Riis signed a two-year deal. Riis had a strong first season at Lyngby, helping the team win promotion back to the Danish Superliga for the 2022–23 season with 25 appearances and one goal. Riis played the first eight games of the 2022–23 season, before suffering a torn meniscus in early September 2022, which required surgery and an injury break for the rest of 2022.

Riis left Lyngby at the end of the 2022–23 season, as his contract wasn't renewed.

=== Stjarnan ===
On 14 August 2023, Riis joined Icelandic Besta deild karla club Stjarnan.

On 30 December 2023, Riis confirmed that at the age of 26, he had been forced to end his professional football career as his 'body could no longer keep up' due to numerous injuries.

== Later career ==
After retiring, Riis returned to his former club, FC Midtjylland, where he joined the academy staff, functioning as an individual coach. He later also worked with several of the club's Danish Superliga players.

== Career statistics ==
Appearances and goals by club, season and competition
Club	Season	League			Cup		Europe		Other		Total	
Club	Season	Division	Apps	Goals	Apps	Goals	Apps	Goals	Apps	Goals	Apps	Goals
Midtjylland	2016–17	Superliga	14	0	1	0	2 (Note: Appearance(s) in the UEFA Europa League)	0	1 (Note: Appearance in Danish Superliga Europa League play-off)	0	18	0
Midtjylland	2017–18	Superliga	2	0	0	0	3	1	—		5	1
Midtjylland	2018–19	Superliga	0	0	0	0	—		—		0	0
Midtjylland	2019–20	Superliga	0	0	0	0	—		—		0	0
Midtjylland	2020–21	Superliga	1	0	0	0	—		—		1	0
Midtjylland	Total		17	0	1	0	5	1	1	0	24	1
Vendsyssel (loan)	2017–18	1st Division	23	1	1	0	—		2 (Note: Appearances in the Superliga relegation play-offs)	0	26	1
Esbjerg (loan)	2018–19	Superliga	1	0	0	0	—		—		1	0
Lyngby	2021–22	1st Division	24	1	2	0	—		—		26	1
Lyngby	2022–23	Superliga	9	1	0	0	—		—		9	1
Lyngby	Total		33	2	2	0	—		—		35	2
Stjarnan	2023	Besta deild karla	0	0	0	0	—		—		0	0
Career total			74	3	4	0	5	1	3	0	86	4

== Honours ==
Midtjylland

- Danish Superliga: 2019–20
- Danish Cup: 2018–19
