= Marc Dal Hende =

Danish footballer (born 1990)

Personal information
- Date of birth: 6 November 1990 (age 36)
- Place of birth: Dragør, Denmark
- Height: 1.81 m (5 ft 11 in)
- Position: Left-back

Team information
- Current team: AB
- Number: 5

Youth career
- Dragør
- Kastrup
- B.93
- KB

Senior career*
Years	Team	Apps	(Gls)
2009–2011	Viborg	36	(4)
2011–2013	AB	39	(9)
2013–2015	Vestsjælland	53	(3)
2015–2017	SønderjyskE	34	(7)
2017–2020	Midtjylland	64	(18)
2020–2025	SønderjyskE	114	(8)
2025–	AB	26	(2)
- * Club domestic league appearances and goals as of 18 June 2026

Marc Dal Hende (Danish pronunciation: [ˈmɑːk tæˀl ˈhentə]; born 6 November 1990) is a Danish professional footballer who plays for Danish 2nd Division club AB.

== Career ==
1 December 2009, Dal Hende signed a one-and-a-half-year contract with Viborg FF after having played for the FC Copenhagen reserve team in the Danish third tier. His contract was not renewed, however, and he signed with AB one a one-year deal in the summer of 2011. In June 2013, Dal Hende signed a three-year contract with FC Vestsjælland who had just been promoted to the Danish Superliga. He scored his first goal for FCV on 15 September 2013 against Randers FC. On 31 August 2015, Dal Hende signed a two-year contract with SønderjyskE.

The first rumors of Dal Hende joining FC Midtjylland began during the summer of 2016, but the deal was finalized roughly half a year later, on 29 January 2017. He won two Danish Superliga trophies and a Danish Cup while at Midtjylland, amassing 81 total appearances in which he scored an impressive 21 goals from his position as left back.

On 9 August 2020, Dal Hende returned to SønderjyskE, signing a three-year contract with the club from Haderslev. In May 2023, Dal Hende extended the contract with Sønderjyske by one more year.

On 3 January 2025, Dal Hende signed a contract with Danish 2nd Division club AB starting from 1st July 2025, where his contract with SønderjyskE expires.

== Honours ==
Midtjylland

- Danish Superliga: 2017–18, 2019–20
- Danish Cup: 2018–19
