= Jonas Borring =

Danish footballer (born 1985)

Personal information
- Full name: Jonas Skov Borring
- Date of birth: 4 January 1985 (age 41)
- Place of birth: Ringkøbing, Denmark
- Height: 1.93 m (6 ft 4 in)
- Position: Left winger

Youth career
- Glamsbjerg
- Årslev
- Dalum IF
- 2003–2004: B 1913

Senior career*
Years	Team	Apps	(Gls)
2003–2004	B 1913	16	(7)
2004–2008	OB	86	(11)
2008–2012	FC Midtjylland	121	(24)
2012–2016	Randers	76	(14)
2016	Brøndby	1	(0)
2016–2018	FC Midtjylland	44	(5)
2018–2019	AC Horsens	29	(2)
Total		373	(63)

International career
2002	Denmark U18	1	(0)
2004	Denmark U20	4	(0)
2006	Denmark U21	1	(1)
2008–2009	Denmark	6	(1)
- * Club domestic league appearances and goals

Jonas Skov Borring (born 4 January 1985) is a Danish former professional footballer who played as a left winger.

== Club career ==
=== OB ===
Borring started his career in Glamsbjerg IF and has later played for Årslev Boldklub, Dalum IF and B 1913 before joining OB in July 2004 on a one-year contract. Before his transfer to OB, he had appeared for various of the Danish youth national teams. Borring had a good first year at OB, and got his contract extended until 2007 in December 2004.

In the 2005–06 season, Borring played the first five matches, two of which were from start. But he got injured in the thigh, and was out for a month. A month after a friendly match against Viborg FF in the winter break 2006 where Borring scored two goals, the club offered him a contract extension until 2010. But the rest of the season was filled with injuries for the young winger. He became a regular part of the squad in the 2006–07, when the club's former coach, Bruce Rioch, showed him great confidence, which he utilized. Borring played 32 league games in this season and scored five goals. His good performances gained him a place on the national team in September 2007.

=== FC Midtjylland ===
FC Midtjylland presented on 23 June 2008 Borring as a new player, where he signed a four-year contract with the club. The deal was the biggest deal ever between the two Danish clubs [7] after the price would have been 21 million kr. He quickly became a profile for the team and played 32 league games, scoring ten goals, in his first season at FCM. His first half year at FCM was so successful, that he was followed by Greek club Panathinaikos in the winter break 2009. After this season Borring revealed, that his plans was to play for a foreign club after the upcoming season. He left the club after four good seasons. It was confirmed on 1 May 2012.

=== Randers FC ===
After interest from foreign clubs, Esbjerg fB and a trail at German club FSV Frankfurt, he signed for Randers FC on 31 August 2012. He got his debut on 16 September 2012 in 4–0 defeat against AaB. He had a good first season with 21 league games, the second place in the Danish Cup and the third place in the league. The following season started bad with some small injury problems; however, he played 25 league games in that season. His contract got extended in March 2014 for three years.

Borring incurred an injury in his groin in summer 2014, which resulted in an operation. After he got back from the injury some months later, he started on the bench. Borring only got five games from the start in the 2014–15 season. Contract negotiations began in November 2015, but Borring wasn't sure about his future and decided to postpone it.

==== Marriage episode ====
Randers FC had to miss Jonas Borring for an unknown period, due to some personal reasons. This was announced by the club in March 2015 Two days later, he signed a two-year contract extension. The personal reasons were shortly after being published. The problem was that Borring's wife, Kira Egsgaard Borring, had left him, and had come along with Borring's team-mate, Christian Keller. Borring went out to the media and said that he would not play for Randers again, as long as Keller was on the team: "Directly asked if I want to play with him again, I can clearly answer no. One thing is, that I have lost everything for my ex-wife, especially when we got to children, but another thing is, that I have a captain, who stabbed me in the back and has violated the rules of the locker room, so I’m sad and disappointed, and I’m still in shock." Randers took the captaincy from Keller as a result of his doing. The other players in the squad supported Borring. On 23 March 2016, Borring left Randers due to the romantic involvement between team-mate Christian Keller and Borring's ex-wife.

Borring's coach Colin Todd revealed in June 2016, after Borring had joined Brøndby IF, that he had told Keller that he had lost all of his respect for him and Keller would not play for him again as long as he was the coach.

=== Brøndby IF ===
After Borring left Randers, he had bids from three Norwegian clubs and interest from Lyngby Boldklub, but signed for Brøndby IF on 29 April 2016. Borring could join Brøndby immediately, but first play matches for the club from the coming season. Borring played his first game for Brøndby in May in a reserve match.

Borring got his debut for Brøndby on 17 July 2016 in a 4–0 victory against Esbjerg fB. But the following day Borring revealed, that he was not sure about he would stay in Brøndby. The problem was, that he expected to play as a winger when he signed the contract with Brøndby, but coach Alexander Zorniger was using him as an attacker.

=== FC Midtjylland ===
After only three months at Brøndby, FC Midtjylland and Brøndby agreed a swap deal that sent Borring to FC Midtjylland and Marco Ureña to Brøndby IF. He had a great first season in FCM, where he played 34 games, scored three goals and made 12 assists.

=== AC Horsens ===
Borring signed for AC Horsens on 9 January 2018. He got his contract terminated by mutual consent on 18 August 2019.

=== Retirement ===
On 7 September 2019, Borring announced on Instagram, that he had decided to retire.

== Honours ==
OB

- Danish Cup: 2006–07
