= Rilwan Olanrewaju Hassan =

Nigerian footballer (born 1991)

Rilwan Hassan
Personal information
- Full name: Rilwan Olanrewaju Hassan
- Date of birth: 9 February 1991 (age 35)
- Place of birth: Lagos, Nigeria
- Height: 1.72 m (5 ft 8 in)
- Position: Midfielder

Team information
- Current team: Sreenidi Deccan
- Number: 77

Youth career
- Ebedei

Senior career*
Years	Team	Apps	(Gls)
2010–2019	Midtjylland	223	(23)
2019–2022	SønderjyskE	74	(4)
2022–2023	HamKam	6	(0)
2023–	Sreenidi Deccan	26	(6)
- * Club domestic league appearances and goals as of 10 March 2024

Rilwan Olanrewaju Hassan (born 9 February 1991) is a Nigerian professional footballer who plays as a midfielder for I-League club Sreenidi Deccan.

== Career ==
Hassan played in the Europa League second round qualifying match against The New Saints on 14 July 2011, scoring the equalising goal. He spent ten seasons in the Danish Superliga with Midtjylland, winning two league championships, scoring 23 goals and making 30 assists in 222 appearances.

In May 2019, Hassan joined SønderjyskE signing a one-year contract with the option of a second year. In May 2022, after SønderjyskE's relegation from the Superliga, he left the club.

Hassan joined I-League club Sreenidi Deccan in January 2023. He helped the club qualifying for 2023 Indian Super Cup. On 12 April in their second group stage match against Kerala Blasters, he scored a goal in their 2–0 win. They failed to progress to the semi-finals, after a 1–0 defeat in last group stage match against RoundGlass Punjab on 16 April.

== Honours ==
SønderjyskE

- Danish Cup: 2019–20
