= MCH Arena =

Football stadium in Herning, Denmark

- Logo of MCH Arena since spring of 2016

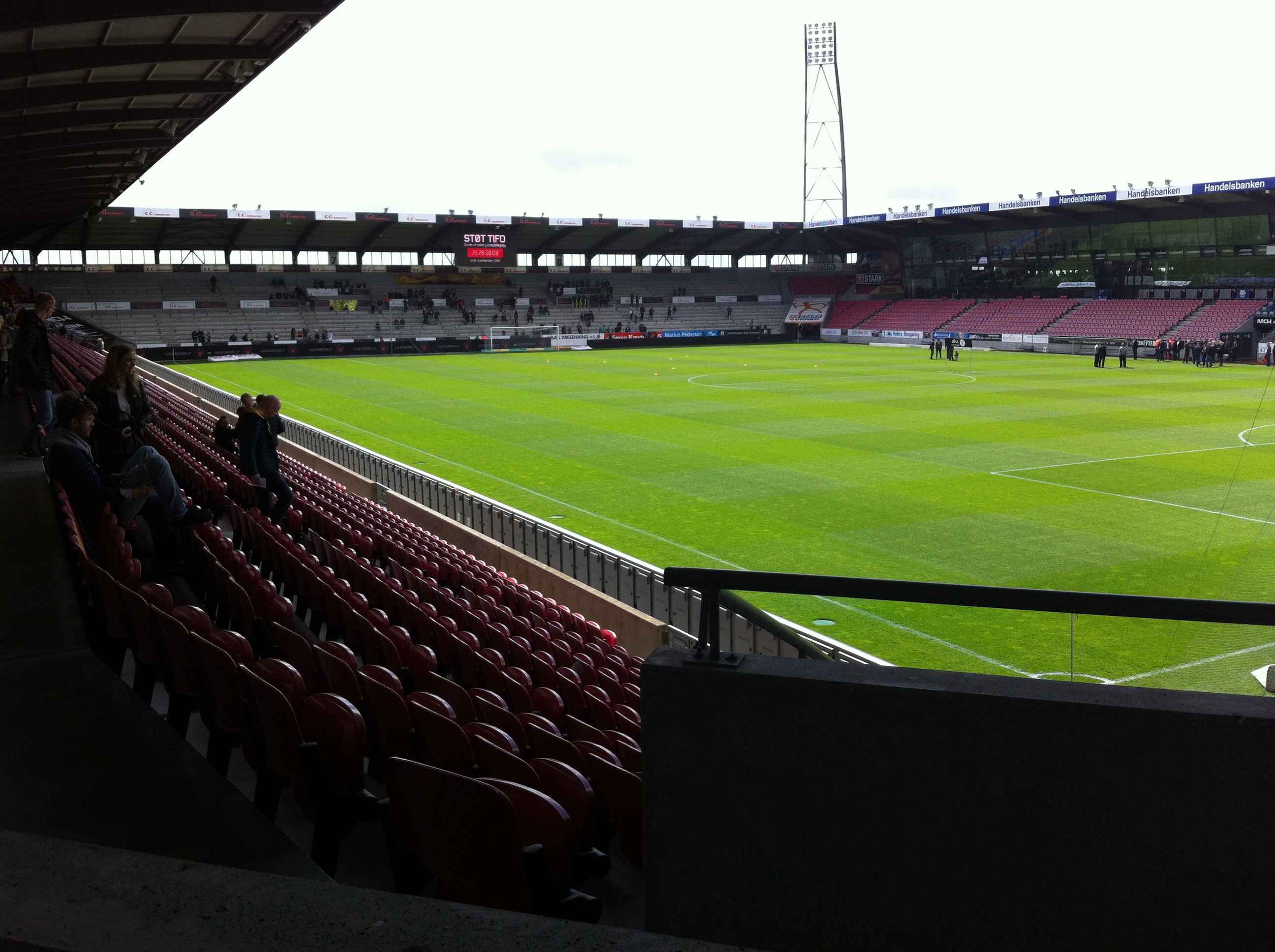
- View of the stadium before a match in July 2015
- Interactive map of MCH Arena
- Full name: MCH Arena
- Former names: Stadion ved Messecenter Herning (2003–2004); SAS Arena (2004–2009); MCH Arena (2009–present); Herning Stadion (2011)
- Location: Kaj Zartows Vej 5; 7400 Herning
- Coordinates: 56°07′01″N 8°57′06″E
- Owner: MCH Group A/S
- Capacity: 12,055 (7,790 seated)
- Surface: Natural grass
- Record attendance: 12,032 (FC Midtjylland vs Aarhus Gymnastikforening, 20 April 2026)
- Field size: 104 by 65 metres (113.7 yd × 71.1 yd)

Construction
- Groundbreaking: 2 April 2003
- Built: 2003–2004
- Opened: 27 March 2004; 22 years ago
- Renovated: ~2008
- Cost: DKK 80–85 million (2003–2004)
- Architect: Kobra Arkitekter A/S

Tenant
- FC Midtjylland (2004–present)

The MCH Arena is an association football stadium situated in the south of Herning, Denmark, that is part of MCH Messecenter Herning complex and owned by MCH Group A/S. It has been the home ground of FC Midtjylland since March 2004. An integrated part of the arena is a main building housing the club's administration and offices for the official fan club (named Black Wolves), and includes player and referee facilities, a restaurant, a VIP lounge, press and sky boxes, and a club shop (named Ulveshoppen). The total capacity during domestic matches is 12,055 spectators with 7,790 seatings (western and eastern grand stands and partly north stand) making it the 9th largest football stadium in Denmark. At international FIFA and UEFA matches, the capacity of the four covered single-tiered stands is reduced to 10,150. The stadium's current attendance record of 12,018 spectators came on 25 May 2025 when FC Midtjylland played against Randers FC.

During the construction period and the first couple of months after the official opening on 27 March 2004, it was called Stadion ved Messecenter Herning (or Messecenter Herning Stadion). On 5 August 2004, it was announced that Scandinavian Airlines (SAS) had acquired the naming rights of the stadium in a sponsorship arrangement, and the stadium was officially known as SAS Arena until 30 June 2009 — the first sponsorship of its kind in Denmark. The current name, MCH Arena, was introduced on 1 July 2009. It was one of four venues for the 2011 UEFA European Under-21 Football Championship, staging three matches in Group B and a semi-final. During the competition, the stadium was known as Herning Stadion. Apart from hosting several European Cup matches, the stadium has also staged four friendlies for the Denmark national team. The 2013 European Dressage Championship was held in Herning with the stadium being one of the locations.

== History ==
On 1 November 2000, the CEO of Messecenter Herning A/S (now known as MCH Group A/S), Georg Sørensen, presented a comprehensive development plan for the company's upcoming 25 years, named Vision 2025, which also launched the plans for the construction of a stadium. On 29 November 2000, the board of the then-newly founded FC Midtjylland had made the decision to eventually relocate the team to a new contemporary stadium in connection with the exhibition centre in Herning — despite great dissatisfaction from one of the team's parents clubs, Ikast FS — arguing that a stadium located at Hammerum in between the cities, Herning and Ikast, of the two former rival mother clubs would not have the same possibilities and visions. At a press briefing at Messecenter Herning on 4 February 2003, it was announced that the plans for a more than 10,000-spectator large stadium as part of a major commercial and entertainment complex would become a greenfield project, located south of the existing buildings of exhibition centre, next to 15,000 parking spots and an upcoming highway intersection, and that the stadium and its facilities was entered in to a lease agreement with FC Midtjylland with an annual rent obligation based on a 25-year rental agreement, irrevocable from both parties until the end of 2027, and giving FC Midtjylland exclusive (and commercial) rights to all association football matches in the stadium. Construction of the stadium broke ground on 2 April 2003 at 08:30 CET and was scheduled to be finished in approximately 11 months, costing in the area of 80–85 million DKK to build.

Integrated with the venue's main stand in the western section is a three-storey main building at 5.000 m^{2}, which from the very beginning have been housing the club's administration and offices for the official supporter's club (Black Wolves), along with a double-high foyer, player and referee changing facilities on the main floor, a VIP lounge with a restaurant on the second floor, press rooms on the first floor and sky boxes on the second floor, and a club shop (Ulveshoppen) to the right of the main building. Three red vertical concrete structures highlight the stadium's main entrance. The top floor have commentator-boxes, a platform for cameras and separate VIP rooms. The spectators enter the stadium using four ticket entrances placed in each corner of the sports facility, giving access to the freestanding stairs leading into the stands. The entire stadium covered 17,000 m^{2} and a total of 7,000 tonnes of concrete was used by the turnkey contractor KPC Byg A/S with Midtconsult A/S as the consulting engineer. The entire grass turf, which had the dimensions of 111 x 72 meters (circa 8,000 m^{2}) and featured a 104 x 65 meters football pitch, was laid by the company Dan Jord (based in Aarhus) i co-operation with Hedeselskabet A/S during the fall of 2003, and allowed to grow firmly in the winter period. 800 m of water pipes and 2,100 m of drainage was installed underneath the grass turf in addition to 27 km of heating pipes with spacing of 30 cm in between. An advanced water sprinkler system was integrated in the grass, which rise above the lawn with an increase of the water pressure.

The architects from the Herning-based company Kobra Arkitekter A/S (merged into Årstiderne Arkitekter A/S in May 2008) sought inspiration from onsite visits at among other Amsterdam ArenA, Philips Stadion and Camp Nou. The corners of the stadium, above the big gates, were closed of to provide a greater feeling of intimacy. The simplicity in both the construction and the use of materials is prevalent, with raw concrete and steel forming the backbone of the stadium. The club specifically asked that the south and north stands be standing-only with seats in red placed only at the main stand and the opposing eastern grand stand — with the option of installing seats at the terraces when needed, expandable to 10,500 seats. Depending on demand, the east standing section of the north stand would be reserved for visiting supporters of the guest teams, separating them from the rest of the spectators by a fence, while the home fans and fan club members would occupy the south standing-only stand and also allocated to half of the north stand. The design of the stadium was made with possible expansion at a later date in mind — the foundation allows for an increase of the capacity of up to 50,000 spectators and the roof could in such a situation be raised. The roof consisting of black lightweight trapez steel plates, covering all four stands, is carried by large free-standing steel columns provided by the Brabrand-based company Richard Thomsen A/S, creating the only separation against the outside of the stadium.

The stadium's official opening competitive match was played on 27 March, when FC Midtjylland faced Akademisk BK in the 2003–04 Danish Superliga in front of 11,083 spectators, resulting in 6–0 win with Mohamed Zidan scoring the first goal after five minutes and five goals in total. FC Midtjylland had been playing all their matches in the fall season of 2003 at Ikast Stadium, that had a capacity of 12,000 with a small grand stand of 1,002 seats, at Ikast, now relocating their home ground to Herning. The average attendance was boosted considerably as a result of the new stadium and better performance on the pitch by the players. The first European fixture at the new venue was played on 3 July 2004, when Esbjerg fB and OGC Nice meet in the second round of the 2004 UEFA Intertoto Cup. Due to reconstruction after 2007, the original capacity of the stadium at approximately 12,500 spectators with 7,500 seats was reduced to 11.432 spectators with 7,070 seats. On 16 August 2005, a national football match featuring the Denmark national under-21 football team against an English squad, was played for the first time at the venue.

== Name, sponsorships and logos ==
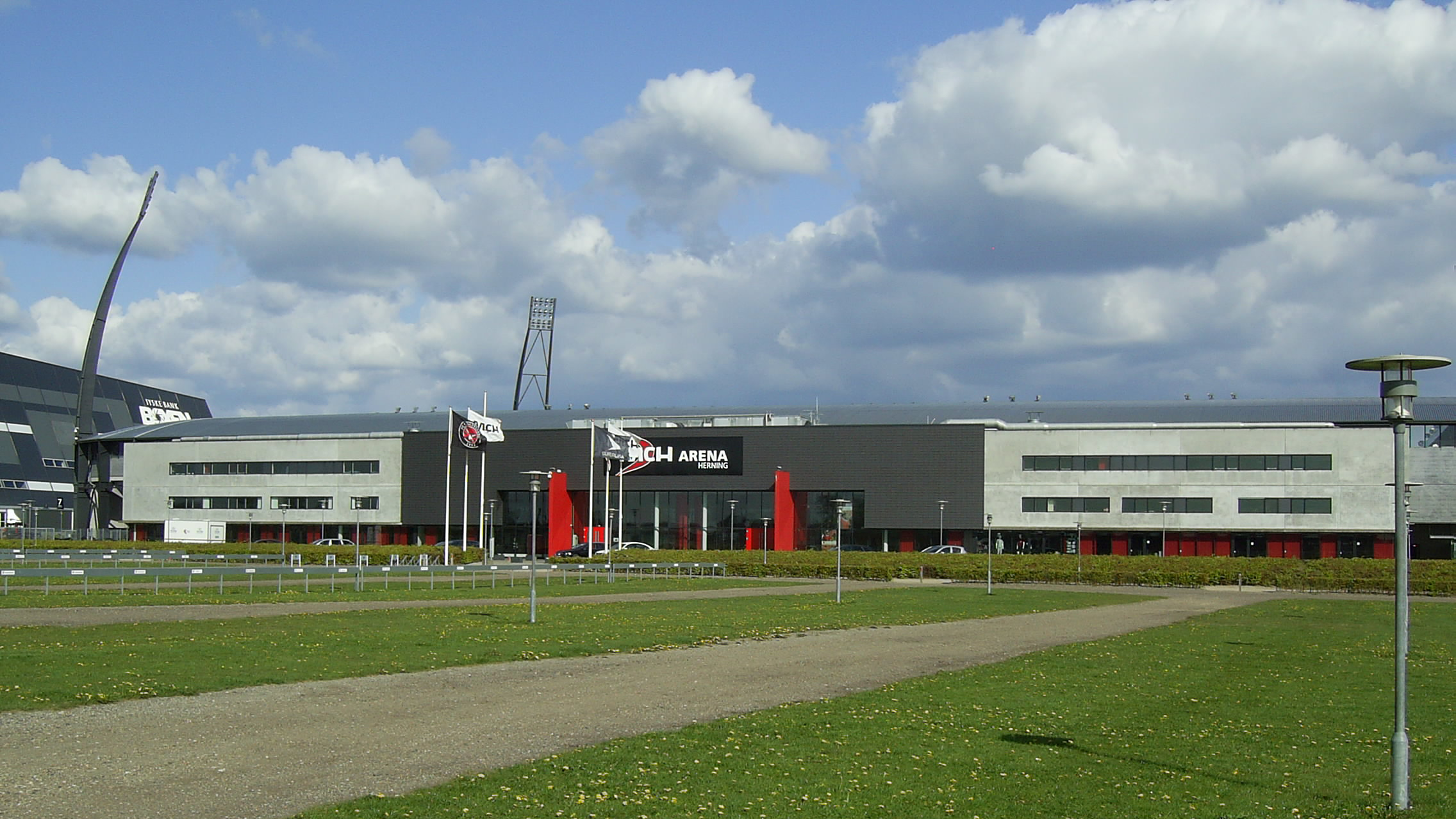
A view of the stadium from the west showing the grand stand and main building, including the previous MCH Arena sign used between 2009 and 2016.

Up until the summer of 2004, the new stadium did not officially have a name and was simply referred to as Stadion ved Messecenter Herning (or Messecenter Herning Stadion), because the owner, MCH, was hoping to sell the name for commercial purposes. On 5 August 2004, Scandinavian Airlines acquired the naming rights to the venue, changing its name to the SAS Arena, becoming the first sponsored football stadium in Denmark. SAS already had the naming rights to the Danish Superliga due to its sponsorship of the league. At the end of the 2009–10 season the sponsorship expired, and was the stadium's name was changed to MCH Arena (short for MesseCenterHerning). In March 2004, the south end stand was initially named Nordea-tribunen, the north end stand became Steff Houlberg-tribunen, the east grand stand was called Faxe Kondi-tribunen, while the main stand went as Elite Miljø-tribunen.

Logos used for the naming rights agreements of the stadium:

SAS Arena
(2004–2009)
Sponsor: Scandinavian Airlines

MCH Arena
(2009–2016)
No sponsor

MCH Arena
(2016–present)
No sponsor
