= Marco Larsen =

Danish footballer (born 1993)

Personal information
- Full name: Marco Tejmer Larsen
- Date of birth: 15 May 1993 (age 33)
- Place of birth: Ringsted, Denmark
- Height: 1.80 m (5 ft 11 in)
- Positions: Midfielder; forward

Youth career
- Ringsted IF
- –2008: Køge BK
- 2008–2011: FC Midtjylland

Senior career*
Years	Team	Apps	(Gls)
2011–2017	FC Midtjylland	56	(7)
2016	→ Vejle BK (loan)	8	(0)
2017	→ HB Køge (loan)	11	(1)

International career
2008–2009	Denmark U16	7	(2)
2009–2010	Denmark U17	9	(2)
2010–2011	Denmark U18	4	(1)
2011–2012	Denmark U19	9	(0)
2013–2014	Denmark U21	4	(0)
- * Club domestic league appearances and goals as of 21 June 2016

Marco Tejmer Larsen (born 15 May 1993) is a Danish retired football player who last played for Danish Superliga club FC Midtjylland. He has represented Denmark internationally at levels up to Denmark under-21.
