= Bruninho (footballer, born 1989) =

Brazilian footballer

Personal information
- Full name: Bruno Anderson da Silva Sabino
- Date of birth: 29 September 1989 (age 37)
- Place of birth: Porto Alegre, Brazil
- Height: 1.78 m (5 ft 10 in)
- Position: Right winger

Senior career*
Years	Team	Apps	(Gls)
2012–2013	Lajeadense		
2012–2013	→ Ponte Preta (loan)	5	(0)
2013	Nacional-AM	6	(4)
2013–2014	Vitória Setúbal	14	(1)
2014	Passo Fundo	9	(2)
2014	Caxias	4	(0)
2014–2015	HB Køge	33	(12)
2015–2016	Nordsjælland	15	(9)
2016–2018	Guangzhou R&F	7	(0)
2016–2017	→ Midtjylland (loan)	11	(0)
2017–2018	→ R&F (loan)	8	(0)
2020	Lajeadense		
2020	Pelotas	6	(1)
2021	HB Køge	3	(0)
- * Club domestic league appearances and goals as of 14:28, 1 January 2022 (UTC)

Bruno Anderson da Silva Sabino, known simply as Bruninho or Bruno Sabino; born 29 September 1989) is a Brazilian professional footballer who plays as a right winger.

== Career ==
=== HB Køge ===
Bruninho signed a three-year contract with Danish 1st Division club HB Køge on 22 July 2014, becoming the fourth Brazilian player to join the club during the transfer window, besides Washington Brandão, Fernando and Kauê. He impressed during his season in the second tier of Danish football, scoring 11 goals for the club.

=== Nordsjælland ===
On 22 July 2015, Bruninho signed a three-year contract with Danish Superliga club Nordsjælland. There, he also had a strong start, scoring in five goals in his first five league appearances. He made a total of 16 appearances for the club, scoring nine goals.

=== Guangzhou R&F ===
After only six months at Nordsjælland, Bruninho moved to Chinese Super League club Guangzhou R&F on 13 January 2016. In August 2016, he returned to Denmark when he signed a one-year loan deal with Midtjylland. He left Guangzhou R&F in April 2018, where he became a free agent.

=== Lajeadense and Pelotas ===
On 24 September 2020, Bruninho signed with Campeonato Brasileiro Série D club Pelotas, after having been a free agent since the start of the COVID-19 pandemic, where he had played for Lajeadense in the Campeonato Gaúcho Série A2.

=== Return to HB Køge ===
On 31 May 2021, Bruninho made his return to HB Køge, signing a six-month deal with the club. His second spell with Køge was not successful, as he suffered a foot injury early on. As his contract expired in December 2021, he had made only three appearances for the club.
