= FC Midtjylland Academy =

- Full name: Football Club Midtjylland Academy
- Founded: 2004
- Ground: Ikast Stadion, Ikast
- Capacity: 15,000
- Manager: Tonny Hermansen, Rene S. Andersen & Erling Lindegaard (U-19)
- League: Danish U-19 League
- 2009: U-19 League, Winners
Home colours	Away colours

FC Midtjylland Academy is the youth academy of FC Midtjylland. The academy consists of youth teams on under-19, under-17 and under-15 basis.

== History ==
FC Midtjylland Academy is the first Danish football academy based on the academy of FC Nantes Atlantique. All the players live at Sportcenter Ikast, where they also train up to nine times a week. Around eight players in every year usually get a contract with the club.

The academy places the social development of its scholars as a priority, and every student follows a regular schooling at either Idrætsefterskolen i Ikast, Ikast Handelsskole or Ikast Gymnasium and takes part in the daily life of the school.

== Notable players ==
Players who have begun their careers at the FC Midtjylland Academy include Danish international Simon Kjær and New Zealand international Winston Reid. The academy has developed a number of talents from Midtjylland's linked clubs in Nigeria, including Izunna Uzochukwu, Jude Nworuh, Baba Collins and Adigun Salami. Other Danish players to have attended the academy include Simon Kjær‚ Joachim Andersen, Christian Sivebæk, Jesper Juelsgård, Mads Albæk, Erik Sviatchenko, Jonas Lössl, Pione Sisto, Rasmus Kristensen and Gustav Isaksen.

=== U-19 squad ===
As of 3 September 2026

Note: Flags indicate national team as defined under FIFA eligibility rules; some limited exceptions apply. Players may hold more than one non-FIFA nationality.

No.	Pos.	Nation	Player
1	GK	ISL	Sigurður Ingvason
2	DF	NGR	Ikenna Ude-Chukwu
3	DF	DEN	Magne Kristensen
4	DF	SWE	Mario Amini
5	DF	ISL	Egill Arnarsson
6	MF	NGR	Lucky Clement
7	FW	SWE	Emmanuel Alasé
8	MF	DEN	Frederik Vestergaard
9	FW	NGR	Olashile Lawal
10	FW	ISL	Alexander Guðjonsson
11	FW	FIN	Alberto Velásquez
12	DF	DEN	Lau Overgaard

No.	Pos.	Nation	Player
14	DF	NGR	Hassan Kashietu
15	DF	DEN	Tristan Lawaetz
17	MF	DEN	Benjamin Mujkanović
18	FW	SWE	Nathaniel Torres
19	DF	NGR	Jesse Bulus
21	DF	CIV	Chichi Capo
22	DF	NGR	Olaide Owoyemi
23	MF	DEN	Noah Kjer
24	FW	DEN	James Alphinas
25	DF	DEN	Tobias Agger
27	DF	DEN	Lukas Nielsen
29	MF	DEN	Lasse Madsen

=== U-17 squad ===
As of 3 September 2026

Note: Flags indicate national team as defined under FIFA eligibility rules; some limited exceptions apply. Players may hold more than one non-FIFA nationality.

No.	Pos.	Nation	Player
1	GK	DEN	Sebastian Lindhardt
2	DF	DEN	Albert Riis
3	DF	DEN	Berthram Svendsen
5	DF	DEN	Frederik Nykjær
7	FW	DEN	Tahir Kolici
8	MF	DEN	Oskar Jørgensen
9	FW	FRA	Enzo Beck
10	MF	POL	Oskar Borko
11	FW	SWE	Pharrell Kristiansen
12	DF	DEN	Villads Kristensen
14	MF	DEN	Lucca Soares

No.	Pos.	Nation	Player
15	DF	DEN	Andreas Larsen
16	GK	DEN	Christian Gaardbo
17	FW	DEN	Sofus Krogh
18	DF	DEN	Mads Lindbjerg
19	DF	DEN	Viktor Johansen
20	MF	DEN	Nikolaj Vestergaard
21	FW	DEN	Hector Gotlieb
22	DF	DEN	Theodor Hey
23	MF	DEN	Otto Fruensgaard
25	MF	DEN	Elliot Langhoff
27	FW	DEN	Oscar Svanholm
