= List of African association football families =

This is a list of association football (soccer) families. The countries are listed according to the national teams of the senior family member if the other family member played for a different country.

== A ==
=== Algeria ===
- Farès Bahlouli, (France) Mohamed Bahlouli, (France) Djibril Bahlouli (brothers), (France) Nesrine Bahlouli (sister)
- Karim Benyamina, (Note: Was born in Germany, but represented Algeria internationally.) Soufian Benyamina (brother)
- Lina Chabane, (Morocco) Amine Chabane
- Fathi Chebal, (France) Jordan Faucher (nephew)
- Tahar Chérif El-Ouazzani, Abdennour Chérif El-Ouazzani (brother), Hichem Chérif El-Ouazzani (son)
- Abdelkader Ferhaoui, (France) Ryan Ferhaoui (son)
- Abdelkader Ghezzal, (Note: Was born in France, but represented Algeria internationally.) Rachid Ghezzal (Note: Was born in France and capped for their under-20 side, before switching allegiance to Algeria.) (brother)
- Nacer Guedioura, Adlène Guedioura (son)
- Jugurtha Hamroun, Rezki Hamroune (cousin)
- Mohamed Kaci-Saïd, Kamel Kaci-Saïd (brother)
- Walid Mesloub, (Portugal) Mezian Mesloub (son)
- Ahmed Oudjani, Chérif Oudjani (son)
- Antar Yahia, Karim Ziani (brother-in-law)
- Abdelaziz Zarabi, Abderraouf Zarabi (son), Kheireddine Zarabi (son)
- Malik Zorgane, Adem Zorgane (son)

=== Angola ===
- Bastos, Nandinho (brother)
- Diangi Matusiwa, Azor Matusiwa (brother)
- Wilson Eduardo, (Note: Was born in Portugal, but represented Angola internationally.) João Mário (brother)
- Rudy, (Portugal) Quévin Castro (brother)
- Joaquim Alberto Silva, Xande Silva (son)
- Beto Vidigal, Lito Vidigal (brother), José Luís Vidigal (Note: Was born in Angola, but represented Portugal internationally.) (brother), Toni Vidigal (brother), Jorge Filipe Vidigal (brother), André Vidigal (son)
- Toy Vilhena, Janet Morin (vrouw), Sabrina Vilhena(daughter), Randy Vilhena (son), Tonny Vilhena (brother), Gilberto da Silva (cousin of Randy, Sabrina & Tonny; nephew of Toy & Janet)

== B ==
=== Benin ===
- Dinalo Adigo, Ryan Adigo (son)
- Moudachirou Amadou, Amiro Amadou (son)
- Stéphane Sessègnon, Ryan Sessegnon (cousin), Steven Sessegnon (cousin/twin brother of Ryan)
- Tony Toklomety, (Israel) Idan Gorno (son)

=== Botswana ===
- Noah Maposa, Stephen Maposa (brother)

=== Burkina Faso ===
- Aristide Bancé (see Aruna Dindane)
- Paul Koulibaly, Pierre Koulibaly (twin brother)
- Kamou Malo, Patrick Malo (son)
- Alassane Ouédraogo, (Germany) Assan Ouédraogo (son)
- Feu Traoré Isaï, Alain Traoré, Bertrand Traoré (sons), Lassina Traoré (nephew)

=== Burundi ===
- Elvis Kamsoba, Pacifique Niyongabire (brother)
- Omar Mussa Sr, Omar Mussa Jr (son)
- Beltran Mvuka, (Norway) Joel Mvuka (brother)
- Diamant Ramazani, (Belgium) Largie Ramazani (brother)

== C ==
=== Cameroon ===
- Paul Bahoken, Stéphane Bahoken (son)
- Cyrille Florent Bella, (Germany) Armel Bella-Kotchap (son)
- David Emane (father), Douka Abdoulaye, Bassirou Nkoto (twins)
- Joseph Elanga, (Sweden) Anthony Elanga (son),
- Achille Emaná, Stephane Emaná (brother) Nathan Ngoumou (cousin)
- Samuel Eto'o, David Eto'o, Etienne Eto'o I (brothers), Etienne Eto'o II (son)
- Joseph-Désiré Job, Marvin Matip, Joël Matip (distant cousins)
- Mathurin Kameni, Carlos Kameni (brother), (Spain) Luka Kameni (son of Carlos & nephew of Mathurin), Junior Kameni (son of Mathurin & nephew of Carlos)
- André Kana-Biyik, François Omam-Biyik (brother), Francis Eliezer Omam (cousin), Jean-Armel Kana-Biyik (son)
- Guy Madjo, (England) Brian Madjo (son)
- Marcel Mahouvé, (Germany) Francis Banecki (nephew), (Germany) Nicole Banecki (niece, sister of Francis)
- Bayoi Makoun, (Venezuela) Christian Makoun (son)
- Jean Makoun Sr., Jean Makoun (son)
- Stéphane Mbia, Franck Etoundi (brother)
- Edouard Oum Ndeki, Jean-Paul Ndeki (brother)
- Marcel Ndjeng (see (Germany) Dominique Ndjeng)
- Lilian Njoh, (France) Yonis Njoh (brother)
- Paul-Georges Ntep, (France) Pierre Ekwah, (France) Ludéric Etonde (cousins)
- Fabrice Ondoa, André Onana (cousin)
- Rigobert Song, Alex Song (nephew)
- Jacques Songo'o, Franck Songo'o, Yann Songo'o (sons)
- Guy Tapoko, (France) Kevin Tapoko (son)
- Alphonse Tchami, Bertrand Tchami, Joël Tchami, Hervé Tchami (brothers)
- Bill Tchato, Enzo Tchato (son)
- Alexis Tibidi Sr., (France) Alexis Tibidi Jr. (son)
- Stéphane Zobo, Stève Mvoué (brother)

=== Cape Verde ===
- Fábio Arcanjo, Telmo Arcanjo (brother)
- Laros Duarte, Deroy Duarte (brother)
- Bruno Leite (see António Sousa)
- Rodny Lopes Cabral, Sidny Lopes Cabral (brother)
- Jamiro Monteiro, Ayoni Santos (brother)
- Garry Rodrigues, Jerson Cabral (cousin)
- Cláudio Tavares, (Portugal) Miguel Tavares (brother), (Portugal) Renato Sanches (cousin)
- Fernando Varela, (Portugal) Gustavo Varela (son)
- Nélson Veiga, (Portugal) Renato Veiga (son)
- Vozinha, Delmiro (brother)

=== Central African Republic ===
- Evans Kondogbia, Geoffrey Kondogbia (brother)
- Eloge Enza Yamissi, Manassé Enza-Yamissi (brother)
- Quentin N'Gakoutou, (Gabon) Yannis N'Gakoutou, Wesley N'Gakoutou (brothers)
- Alias Lembakoali, (Slovakia) Alan Lembakoali (son)
- Kelly Youga, Amos Youga (brother), Willem Geubbels (nephew)
- Lionel Zouma, Kurt Zouma, Yoan Zouma (brothers)

=== Chad ===
- Japhet N'Doram, Rodrigue N'Doram, Kévin N'Doram (sons)
- Kévin Nicaise, Faris Haroun, Nadjim Haroun (cousins)
- Haroun Tchaouna, (France) Loum Tchaouna, Franck Tchaouna, Franky Tchaouna (brothers)

=== Comoros ===
- Ibor Bakar, (Note: Was born in France, but represented Comoros internationally.) Djamel Bakar (brother)
- Yannis Kari, Yannick Pandor (cousin), (Madagascar) Ehsan Kari (brother)

== D ==
=== Democratic Republic of the Congo ===
- Fedor Assombalonga, Britt Assombalonga (son)
- William Balikwisha, Michel-Ange Balikwisha (brother)
- Musemestre Bamba, (Germany) Samuel Bamba (son)
- Kakoko Etepé, Yannick Kakoko (son)
- Aldo Kalulu, Gédéon Kalulu, (France) Pierre Kalulu (brothers)
- Wilson Kamavuaka, (Germany) Richard Sukuta-Pasu (cousin)
- Kembo Uba Kembo, Jirès Kembo Ekoko (son), Kylian Mbappé, Ethan Mbappé (Kembo Ekoko's adoptive brothers)
- Lomana LuaLua, Trésor Kandol (cousin), Yannick Bolasie (Note: Was born in France, but represented DR Congo internationally.) (cousin), Kazenga LuaLua (brother),
- Roger Lukaku, Romelu Lukaku, Jordan Lukaku (sons), Boli Bolingoli-Mbombo (nephew)
- Jacques Maghoma, Christian Maghoma, (England) Paris Maghoma (brothers)
- René Makondele, Guy-Guy Lema (cousin), Kuanzambi Barssabas (cousin)
- Kuyangana Makukula, Ariza Makukula (son)
- Richard Mapuata, Cédric Makiadi, Fabrice Makiadi, Matondo Makiadi (sons)
- Ricky Mavuba, Rio Mavuba (son)
- Marcel Kimemba Mbayo, Dylan Mbayo (son)
- Mpangi Merikani, Jonathan Bolingi
- Pelly Ruddock Mpanzu, Peter Kioso (cousin)
- Paul-José M'Poku, Albert Sambi Lokonga (half brother), Fabrice Sambi Lokonga (half brother of Paul José & brother of Albert)
- Arnold Mvuemba, Jonathan Mvuemba, Lionel Menga Mvuemba (brothers)
- Felix Mwamba Musasa, Kabamba Musasa (brother)
- Michel Ngonge, Cyril Ngonge (son)
- Jordan Nkololo, (France) Béni Nkololo (brother)
- Pelly Ruddock Mpanzu, Peter Kioso (cousin)
- Gabriel Zakuani, Steve Zakuani (brother)

== E ==
=== Egypt ===
- Mohamed Aboutrika, Ahmed Aboutrika (son)
- Nader El-Sayed, Ahmed Nader (son)
- Ekramy El-Shahat, Sherif Ekramy (son)
- Yehia Emam, Hamada Emam (son), Hazem Emam (grandson/Hamada's son)
- Saleh Gomaa, Abdallah Gomaa (brother)
- Sayed Abdel Hafeez, Youssef Abdelhafiz (son)
- Hossam Hassan, Ibrahim Hassan (twin brother)
- Yasser Rayyan, Ahmed Yasser Rayyan (son)
- Saleh Selim, Tarek Selim (brother)
- Abdelaziz Tawfik, Ahmed Tawfik (brother), Akram Tawfik (brother)
- Ibrahim Youssef, Ismail Youssef (brother), Sayed Youssef (brother)

=== Equatorial Guinea ===
- Carlos Akapo, Javier Akapo (brother)
- Norberto Balboa, Armando Balboa, Chiqui Balboa (brothers), Domènec Balmanya (brother-in-law's Armando), Javier Balboa (grandson), Álex Balboa (Javier's cousin)
- Benjamín, Iván Zarandona (brother)
- Jannick Buyla, Hugo Buyla (brother)
- Vicente Engonga Nguema, Vicente Engonga, Julio Engonga, Rafa Engonga, Óscar Engonga (sons), Igor (grandson/son of Óscar), Joshua Engonga (grandson/son of Julio)
- Juvenal, Alberto, José Manuel Edjogo-Owono (brothers)
- André Neles, Atila Neles (brother)
- Ruslan Obiang, Pedro Obiang (cousin)
- Sena, Kike Boula (cousin)
- Salomón Obama, Fede (twin brother)

=== Ethiopia ===
- Bekuretsion Gebrehiwot, Lily Yohannes (granddaughter)

== G ==
=== Gabon ===
- Pierre Aubameyang, Catilina Aubameyang (Note: Was born in Gabon, capped by France's under-19 side before switching allegiance to Gabon.) (son), Willy Aubameyang (Note: Was born in France but represented Gabon internationally.) (son), Pierre-Emerick Aubameyang (Note: Was born in France, capped by France's under-21 side before switching allegiance to Gabon.) (son)
- Fabrice Do Marcolino, Arsène Do Marcolino (brother), Alan Do Marcolino, (France) Henrick Do Marcolino (sons), Jonathan Do Marcolino (nephew, son of Arsène)
- Mario Lemina, Noha Lemina (brother)
- Anthony Oyono, Jérémy Oyono (twin brother)

=== Gambia ===
- Hamza Barry, Abubakr Barry (brother)
- Biri Biri, Yusupha Njie (son)
- Alieu Jagne, Saihou Jagne (brother)
- Saidy Janko, (Switzerland) Lenny Janko (brother)
- Jacob Mendy, (Guinea-Bissau) Carlos Mendes Gomes (cousin)
- Cherno Samba, (Note: Was born in the Gambia, called up by England's youth sides up to under-20 level before switching allegiance to the Gambia.) Mustapha Carayol (cousin)
- Bubacarr Sanneh, Muhammed Sanneh (brother)
- Alagie Sosseh, Sal Jobarteh (brother)

=== Ghana ===
- Eric Addo, Ransford Addo (brother)
- Opoku Agyemang, Opoku Antwi (brother)
- Charles Akonnor, (Germany) Jesaja Herrmann (son)
- Shilla Alhassan, Illiasu Shilla (brother)
- Joetex Asamoah Frimpong, Eric Asamoah-Frimpong, Daniel Asamoah Frimpong (brothers)
- Sebastian Barnes, Joselpho Barnes (son)
- Owusu Benson, (Switzerland) Tyron Owusu (son)
- Caleb Ekuban, Joseph Ekuban (brother)
- Baffour Gyan, Asamoah Gyan (brother)
- Edwin Gyasi, Raymond Gyasi (brother)
- Nana Gyau, Philip Gyau (son), Joe Gyau (grandson/son of Philip)
- Bradley Hudson-Odoi, (England) Callum Hudson-Odoi (brother)
- Richard Kingson, Laryea Kingston (brother)
- Samuel Kuffour, (United States) Matai Akinmboni (nephew)
- Nii Lamptey, Nathaniel Lamptey (brother)
- Sulley Muntari, Sulley Muniru (brother)
- Lloyd Owusu, Derek Asamoah (cousin)
- Jacob Partey, Thomas Partey (son), Francis Narh (son/half-brother of Thomas)
- Abedi Pele, Kwame Ayew, Sola Ayew (brothers), André Ayew, Jordan Ayew (sons), Ibrahim Ayew (son/half-brother of André & Jordan)
- Razak Pimpong, (Denmark) Malik Pimpong (son)
- Prince Polley, Robin Polley (son)
- Robert Saba, Christian Saba (brother)
- Edward Sarpei, Hans Sarpei (brother)
- Charles Takyi, Stephen Boachie (cousin)
- Isaac Vorsah, Sampson Cudjoe (cousin)
- Mubarak Wakaso, Alhassan Wakaso (brother)
- Iñaki Williams, (Spain) Nico Williams (brother)
- Ishmael Yartey, Ishaque Yartey (brother)
- Tony Yeboah, (Italy) Kelvin Yeboah (nephew)
- Simon Zibo, Kwasi Sibo (brother)

=== Guinea ===
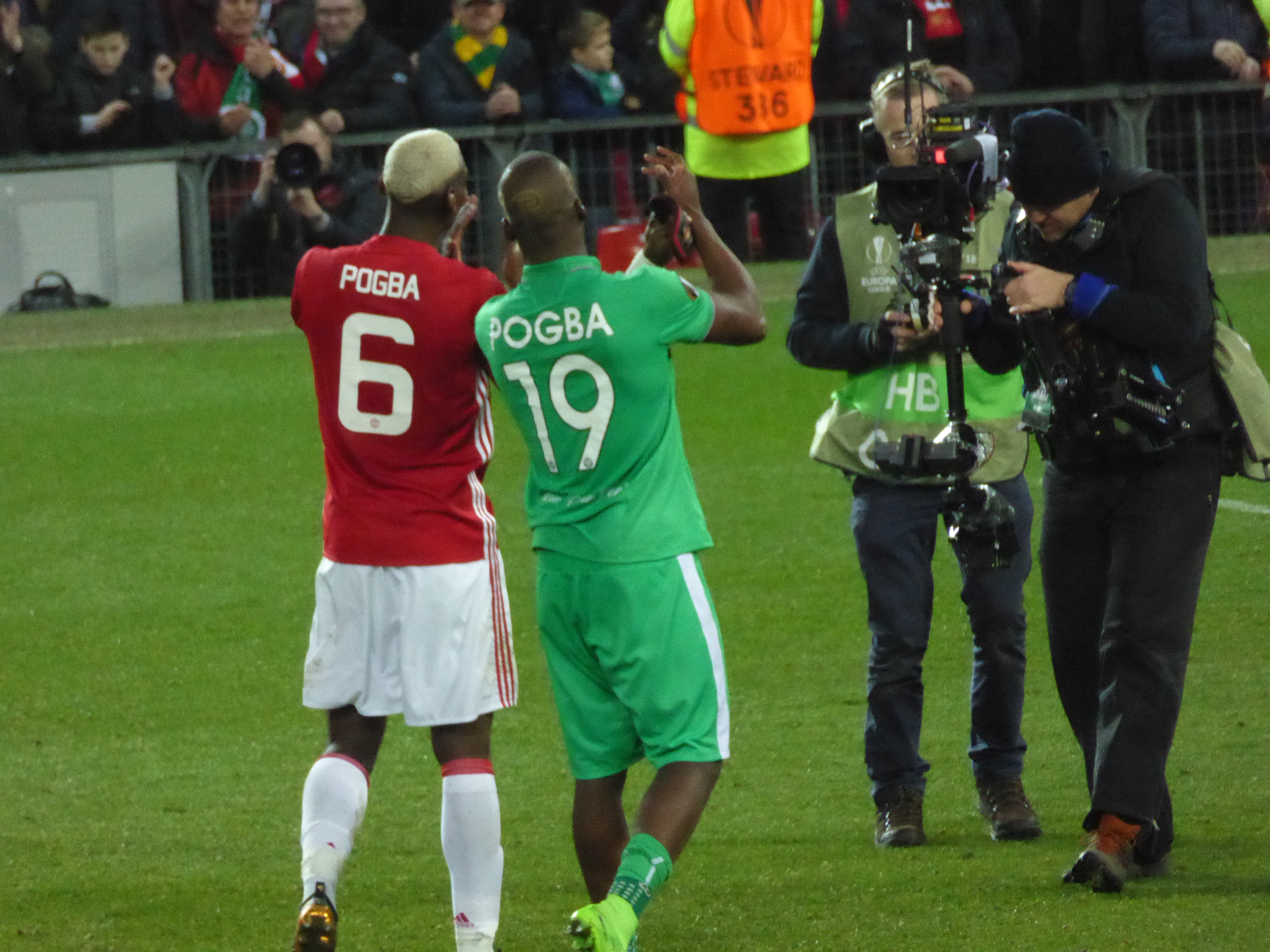
Brothers Paul and Florentin Pogba played against each other in 2017.

- Bobo Baldé, Yasser Baldé (half-brother)
- Fousseni Bamba, Yacouba Bamba (brother)
- Pascal Feindouno, Simon Feindouno, Benjamin Feindouno (brothers), Abdoul Karim Sylla (brother-in-law)
- Ilaix Moriba, Lass Kourouma (brother)
- Souleymane Oularé, Obbi Oularé (son)
- Florentin Pogba, (Note: Has been capped for France's under-20 side.) Mathias Pogba (twin brother), Paul Pogba (brother)

=== Guinea-Bissau ===
- Álvaro Djaló, (Spain) Malcom Adu Ares (cousin)
- Bobó Djalo, Djibril Djaló, Kaby Djaló, (Portugal) Matchoi Djaló (sons)
- Ença Fati, Ansu Fati (cousin)
- Edelino Ié, Edgar Ié (twin brother)
- Almami Moreira, (Belgium) Diego Moreira (son), (Germany) Eric da Silva Moreira (nephew), (Portugal) Emanuel Moreira (nephew).
- Romario Vieira, Ronaldo Vieira (twin brother)

== I ==
=== Ivory Coast ===
- Jean-Jacques Akpa Akpro Jean-Louis Akpa Akpro, Jean-Daniel Akpa Akpro (brothers)
- Ibrahima Bakayoko, (France) Ryan Bakayoko (nephew)
- Yacouba Bamba, Axel Bamba (son)
- Roger Boli, Basile Boli (brother), Yannick Boli (nephew), Kévin Boli, Yohan Boli, Charles Boli (sons)
- Wilfried Bony, Geoff Bony, Orphee Bony (sons)
- Guy Demel, Yannick Sagbo (half-brother)
- Aruna Dindane, Aristide Bancé (brother-in-law)
- Cyril Domoraud, Gilles Domoraud, Jean-Jacques Domoraud (brothers), Christopher Opéri (nephew)
- Seydou Doumbia, Ousmane Doumbia (brother)
- Gervinho, Hubert Yao (brother)
- Michel Goba, Kévin Goba (son), Olivier Tébily (cousin), Didier Drogba, Joël Drogba, Freddy Drogba (nephews), Isaac Drogba (grandnephew/son of Didier), Kenneth Zohore (Didier's cousin-nephew)
- Ambroise Gboho, (France) Yann Gboho (nephew), (France) Marc-Olivier Doué (cousin of Yan Gboho), Guéla Doué, (France) Désiré Doué (brothers, cousins of Yan Gboho and Doue)
- Steve Gohouri, Joël Damahou (cousin)
- Tchiressoua Guel, Moussa Guel (son)
- Evann Guessand. (France) Axel Guessand (brother)
- Bonaventure Kalou, Salomon Kalou (brother)
- Makan Kéïta, Fadel Keïta, Kader Keïta (sons)
- Bakari Koné, Arouna Koné (brother)
- Boubacar Sanogo, (United States) Malick Sanogo (son)
- Joël Tiéhi, Christ Tiéhi (son)
- Kolo Touré, Yaya Touré, Ibrahim Touré (brothers)

== K ==
=== Kenya ===
- McDonald Mariga, Thomas Wanyama (brother), Victor Wanyama (brother)
- Mike Origi, Gerald Origi (brother), Anthony Origi (brother), Austin Origi (brother), Arnold Origi (nephew/son of Austin), Divock Origi (son)

== L ==
=== Liberia ===
- Roberto Kwateh, (Indonesia) Ronaldo Kwateh (son)
- Joe Nagbe, Darlington Nagbe (son)
- Alex Nimely, Sylvanus Nimely (brother)
- George Weah, Christopher Wreh (cousin), George Weah Jr. (son), Timothy Weah (son), Kyle Duncan (nephew), Patrick Weah (nephew)

== M ==
=== Madagascar ===
- Hervé Arsène, Faed Arsène (son)

=== Malawi ===
- Chikondi Banda, Peter Banda (son)
- Tabitha Chawinga, Temwa Chawinga (sister)

=== Mali ===
- Kalifa Cissé, (France) Salif Cissé, Ibrahima Cissé (brothers)
- Samba Diawara, Fousseni Diawara, Abdoulaye Diawara (brothers)
- Salif Keïta, Seydou Keita, Mohamed Sissoko, Sidi Yaya Keita, Oumar Sissoko (nephews)
- Dorgeles Nene, Levy Nene (brother)
- Mamady Sidibé, Lassana Sidibé (brother), Moussa Sidibé (cousin), (England) Sol Sidibe (son).
- Yacouba Sylla, Moussa Sylla (brother)
- Bako Touré, José Touré (son)
- Moha Traoré, (Spain) Adama Traoré (brother)
- Mustapha Yatabaré, Sambou Yatabaré (brother)

=== Morocco ===
- Alami Ahannach, Soufyan Ahannach (brother), Anass Ahannach (cousin)
- Selim Amallah, Maximiliano Caufriez (cousin)
- Nordin Amrabat, Sofyan Amrabat (brother)
- Nabil Baha, Ziyad Baha (son), Mayssa Baha (daughter)
- Nourdin Boukhari, Ayoub Boukhari (brother), Noa Lang (stepson)
- Khalid Boutaïb, Nassim Chadli (nephew)
- Mehdi Carcela, Joachim Carcela (cousin)
- Larbi Chebbak, Ghizlane Chebbak (daughter)
- Sofiane Diop, Edan Diop (brother)
- Oussama El Azzouzi, Anouar El Azzouzi (twin brother)
- Mustapha Hadji, Youssouf Hadji (brother), Samir Hadji, (France) Zachary Hadji (sons)
- Kassem Loune, Adam Loune, Ali Loune, Mehdi Loune (sons)
- Ryan Mmaee, Samy Mmaee, Camil Mmaee (brothers)
- Krimau Merry, Mustafa Merry (brother)
- Hassan Nader, Mohcine Nader (son)
- Hamza Sakhi, (Malta) Ilyas Chouaref (half-brother)
- Salaheddine Sbaï, (France) Amine Sbaï (brother)

=== Mozambique ===
- Sérgio Lomba, Pedro Neto (nephew)
- Zeca Miglietti, Abel Miglietti (brother)
- Paíto, Edson Mucuana (son)

== N ==
=== Namibia ===
- Oliver Risser, Wilko Risser (brother)
- Manfred Starke, Sandra Starke (sister)

=== Niger ===
- Zakari Lambo, Zakari Junior Lambo (son)
- Ibrahim Tankary, Naim Van Attenhoven (nephew)

=== Nigeria ===
- Ola Aina, Jordan Aina (brother)
- Sone Aluko (see Eniola Aluko)
- Efe Ambrose, Peter Ambrose, Emmanuel Ambrose (brothers)
- Shola Ameobi, Tomi Ameobi, Sammy Ameobi (brothers)
- Daniel Amokachi, Kalim Amokachi, Nazim Amokachi (twin sons)
- Emmanuel Amunike, Kingsley Amuneke, Kevin Amuneke (brothers)
- Onyekachi Apam, (France) Lesley Ugochukwu (nephew)
- Femi Azeez, (England) Miguel Azeez (brother)
- Tijani Babangida, Ibrahim Babangida, Haruna Babangida (brothers)
- Emmanuel Babayaro, Celestine Babayaro (brother)
- Bright Dike, Courtney Dike (sister), Daryl Dike (brother)
- Prince Ikpe Ekong, (Sweden) Emmanuel Ekong (son)
- Michael Emenalo, Landon Emenalo (son)
- Augustine Enuekwe, Chioma Ubogagu (granddaughter)
- Dickson Etuhu, Kelvin Etuhu (brother)
- Kadiri Ikhana, Patrick Ovie, Yakubu Ayegbeni (sons-in-law)
- Dominic Iorfa, Dominic Iorfa Jr. (son)
- Nwankwo Kanu, Christopher Kanu (brother), Henry Isaac, Anders Gabolalmo (stepbrothers), Emmanuel Izuagha (stepcousin)
- Oladipupo Martins, Obafemi Martins (brothers), (Italy) Kevin Martins (son of Obafemi, nephew of Oladipupo)
- Segun Odegbami, Wole Odegbami (brother)
- Emmanuel Okocha, Jay-Jay Okocha (brother), Alex Iwobi (nephew)
- Osas Okoro, Stanley Okoro, Charles Okoro (brothers)
- Cyril Okosieme, Ndubuisi Okosieme (son), Nkiru Okosieme (daughter)
- Emmanuel Okoduwa, (see Wesley Okoduwa (son)
- Churchill Oliseh, Sunday Oliseh, Azubuike Oliseh, Egutu Oliseh (brothers), Sekou Oliseh (adopted son of Churchill)
- Toni Payne, Stephen Payne (brother), Nicole Payne (sister)
- Ike Shorunmu, Kayode Irekperu (brother)
- Efe Sodje, Sam Sodje, Akpo Sodje (brothers), Onome Sodje (cousin) (Note: The Sodje family also had a brother who played both rugby football codes, Bright Sodje.)
- Clement Temile, Toto Tamuz (son)
- Ojokojo Torunarigha, Junior Torunarigha (son) Jordan Torunarigha (son) (Note: Born in Germany.)
- Kalu Uche, Ikechukwu Uche (brother)
- Cornelius Udebuluzor, (Hong Kong) Michael Udebuluzor (son)
- John Utaka, Peter Utaka (brother)
- Lawrence Wabara, Mark Walters (son), Reece Wabara (grandson), Simon Ford (Mark's nephew)
- Simon Zenke, Thomas Zenke (brother)

== R ==
=== Republic of the Congo ===
- Christopher Samba, (England) Tyrone Samba (son)

=== Réunion ===
- Aboubakare Baco, Soudjain Baco (brother)
- Anthony Fontaine, Julien Fontaine (brother)
- Raphael Fontaine, Willy Fontaine (brother)
- Nicolas Grondin, Samuel Grondin, Vincent Grondin (brother)
- Damien Hadamar, Jean Hadamar, Willy Hadamar (brother)
- Nathan Lim Houn Tchen, Noah Lim Houn Tchen (brother)
- Fréderic Laiton, Rodrigue Laiton (brother)
- Jordan Louiso, Landry Louiso (brother)
- Akoub Ali M’Madi, Mouhdwar Ali M’Madi (brother)
- Kenny Manglou, Kerry Manglou (brother)
- Florent Marie Marthe, Nicolas Marie Marthe (brother)
- Vincent Mounoussamy, William Mounoussamy (brother)
- Alexandre Payet, Steeve Payet (brother)
- Olivier Payet, Wilson Payet (brother)

=== Rwanda ===
- Fritz Emeran, (France) Noam Emeran (son)
- Nathan Itangishaka, (Netherlands) Trey Itangishaka (brother)
- Manfred Kizito, (Uganda) Nestroy Kizito (brother)
- Joy-Slayd Mickels, Joy-Lance Mickels, Leroy-Jacques Mickels (brothers)
- Chance Mihigo, (Denmark) Jerushom Mihigo (brother)

== S ==
=== São Tomé and Príncipe ===
- Rogério Fernandes, Ricardo Fernandes (twin brother)

=== Senegal ===
- Keita Baldé, (Spain) Mahamadou Baldé (brother)
- Jules Bocandé, Daniel Bocandé (son)
- Issa Cissokho, Aly Cissokho (brother)
- Ali Dia, Simon Dia (son)
- Mame Biram Diouf, Mame Mbar Diouf (brother)
- Khalilou Fadiga, Noah Fadiga (son)
- Alfred Gomis, Lys Gomis, Maurice Gomis (brothers)
- Édouard Mendy, Ferland Mendy (cousin)
- Ousmane N'Doye, Dame N'Doye (brother)
- Lamine Sané, Salif Sané (brother)
- Souleyman Sané, Leroy Sané, Sidi Sané (sons)
- Boubacar Sarr, Mouhamadou-Naby Sarr (son)
- Pape Sarr, Mamadou Sarr (son)
- Oumar Sène, Saër Sène (son)
- Mickaël Tavares, Jacques Faty, Ricardo Faty (cousins)
- Mame Saher Thioune, Ousseynou Thioune (brother)

=== Sierra Leone ===
- Albert Jarrett, Ahmed Deen (cousin)
- Musa Kallon, Kemokai Kallon, Mohamed Kallon (brothers)
- Ibrahim Kargbo, (Belgium) Ibrahim Kargbo Jr. (son)
- Leroy Rosenior, Liam Rosenior (son)

=== Somalia ===
- Hassan Afif, (Qatar) Ali Afif, (Qatar) Akram Afif (sons)
- Ahmed Ali, Mohamud Ali (brother)
- Brian Fatah, Sahoh Fatah (brother)

=== South Africa ===
- Clive Barker, Steve Barker (nephew)
- Goodenough Nkomo, Morgan Gould (son)
- Richard Henyekane, Joseph Henyekane (brother)
- Les Grobler, Bradley Grobler (son)
- Keryn Jordan, Liam Jordan (son)
- Itumeleng Khune, Lucky Khune (brother)
- Jacob Lekgetho, Goarge Lekgetho (brothers)
- Ernest "Botsotso" Makhanya, Joseph Makhanya (son)
- Eric Masilela, Innocent Maela (son), Tsepo Masilela (half-brother)
- Bennett Masinga, Phil Masinga (cousin)
- Mark Mayambela, Mihlali Mayambela (brother)
- Patrick Mayo, Khanyisa Mayo (son)
- Thabo Mngomeni, Thando Mngomeni (brother)
- Percy “Chippa” Moloi, Teboho Moloi (son)
- Zane Moosa, Essop Moosa (brother)
- Kaizer Motaung, Kaizer Motaung Junior (son)
- Esau Phiri, Lebogang Phiri (son)
- Siyabonga Sangweni, Thamsanqa Sangweni (brother)
- Jomo Sono, Eric Bamuza Sono (father), Bamuza Sono (son of Jomo), Matsilela Sono (brother)
- Mark Tovey, Neil Tovey (brother), Quinton Tovey (son of Mark)
- Dougie Williams, Melanie Frosler (sister), Selwyn Frosler (brother in law & husband of Melanie), Ethan Frosler (son of Selwyn & Melanie), Reeve Frosler (son of Melanie & Selwyn Frosler, brother of Ethan & nephew of Dougie Williams)

=== South Sudan ===
- William Akio, (Canada) Victor Loturi (brother)
- Peter Deng, (Note: Was born in Kenya, but represented South Sudan internationally.) Thomas Deng (Note: Was born in Kenya, but represented Australia internationally.) (brother)

=== Sudan ===
- Mohamed Eisa, Abo Eisa (brother)

== T ==
=== Tanzania ===
- David Mwarabu, Djafari Mwarabu (brother))

=== Togo ===
- Samer Abraw, Camaldine Abraw (son)
- Emmanuel Adebayor, Alex Harlley (nephew)
- Roger Aholou, (Ivory Coast) Jean-Eudes Aholou (brother)
- Komlan Assignon, (France) Lorenz Assignon (son)
- Zanzan Atte-Oudeyi, Ismaila Atte-Oudeyi (brother)
- Jonathan Ayité, Floyd Ayité (brother)
- Malcolm Barcola, (France) Bradley Barcola (brother)
- Sadou Boukari, Razak Boukari (son)
- Pierre-Antoine Dossevi, Thomas Dossevi, Mathieu Dossevi (sons)
- Jean-Marie Nadjombe, Pierre Nadjombe (brother)
- Mani Ougadja, Mani Sapol (brother)
- Rafiou Moutairou, Bachirou Salou (half-brother)
- Yao Mawuko Sènaya, Yao Junior Sènaya (brother), (Ghana) Marvin Senaya (son)
- Manu Sunu, Gilles Sunu (son)

=== Tunisia ===
- Ady (footballer), (Brazil) Alisson Santos (son)
- Amine Chermiti, (Portugal) Youssef Chermiti (cousin)
- Aïssa Laïdouni, (Algeria) Naïm Laidouni (brother)
- Iheb Msakni, Youssef Msakni (brother)
- Nabil Taïder, (Note: Was born in France, but represented Tunisia internationally.) Saphir Taïder (brother)
- Sebastian Tounekti, (Sweden) Bryan Fiabema (cousin)
- Yoann Touzghar, (Morocco) Rayan Touzghar (half-brother)

== U ==
=== Uganda ===
- Steven Bogere, Alex Isabirye, Frank Lukomwa (brothers)
- Paul Hasule, Geoffrey Higenyi (brother)
- Noordin Jjuuko, Muzamiru Jjuuko, Murushid Jjuuko (brothers)
- Jimmy Kidega, Moses Oloya (brother)
- Ayub Kisaliita, Habib Kavuma, Sadat Sekajja (brothers)
- Meddie Lubega, Moses Ndawula, Sula Kato, Abbas Mulindwa (brothers)
- Annet Nakimbugwe, Hasifah Nassuna (daughter)
- Denis Obua, David Obua, Eric Obua (sons), Noble Okello (distant nephew)
- Joseph Ochaya, Fred Okot (brother)
- Emmanuel Okwi, Francis Olaki, Martin Opoloti (brothers)
- Ibrahim Sekagya, Hakim Kavuma, Sula Sebbuza (brothers)
- Barack Tumwine, Abdul Wahabu Tumwine, Fazil Tumwine (brothers)
- Sulaiman Tenywa, Mubarak Tenywa, Muhammad Segonga (brothers)

== Z ==
=== Zambia ===
- Kalusha Bwalya, Benjamin Bwalya (brother), Robert Earnshaw (Note: Was born in Zambia, but represented Wales internationally.) (cousin)
- Evans Kangwa, Kings Kangwa (brother)
- Fackson Kapumbu, Kelvin Kapumbu (brother)
- Christopher Katongo, Felix Katongo (brother)
- Charly Musonda Sr. Lamisha Musonda (son), Charly Musonda Jr. (son)
- Enock Mwepu, Francisco Mwepu (brother)
- Andrew Sinkala, Nathan Sinkala (brother)

=== Zimbabwe ===
- Onai Chingawo, Russel Madamombe (husband)
- Wilfred Mugeyi, William Mugeyi (twin brother)
- Knowledge Musona, Walter Musona (brother)
- Madinda Ndlovu, Adam Ndlovu, Peter Ndlovu (brothers)

== See also ==
- List of professional sports families
- List of family relations in American football
  - List of second-generation National Football League players
- List of association football (soccer) families
  - List of European association football families
    - List of English association football families
    - List of former Yugoslavia association football families
    - List of Scottish football families
    - List of Spanish association football families
  - Category:Association football families
- List of Australian rules football families
- List of second-generation Major League Baseball players
- List of second-generation National Basketball Association players
- List of boxing families
- List of chess families
- List of International cricket families
- List of family relations in the National Hockey League
- List of family relations in rugby league
- List of international rugby union families
- List of professional wrestling families
