= Oliseh =

Oliseh is a surname. Notable people with the surname include:

- Sunday Oliseh (born 1974), Nigerian football manager and former footballer
- Azubuike Oliseh (born 1978), Nigerian former footballer
- Egutu Oliseh (born 1980), Nigerian former footballer
- Sekou Oliseh (born 1990), Liberian former footballer
- Isaac Oliseh (born 1993), Nigerian footballer
- Churchill Oliseh, Nigerian football manager

== See also ==
- Olise
