= Jamiu =

Jamiu is a given name. Notable people with the name include:

- Jamiu Alimi (born 1992), Nigerian footballer
- Jamiu Musbaudeen (born 2004), Nigerian footballer
- Ayinde Jamiu Lawal (born 1988), Nigerian footballer
