= Odafe =

- Gender: Unisex
- Language: Isoko

Origin
- Language: Delta State
- Meaning: Wealthy person
- Region of origin: Southern Nigeria

listen

Odafe translates to "Wealthy person" in Isoko language. It is a unisex name but mostly given to the male gender. Among the Isoko people Odafe is a name signifying wealth and prosperity.

Notable people with the name include:

- Odafe Oweh, footballer
- Emmanuel Odafe, footballer
- Odafe Atogun, Nigerian writer
- John Odafe Asiemo, Musician (Daddy Showkey)
- Odafe Onyeka Okolie, footballer
