= Oluwafemi Ajilore =

Nigerian footballer (born 1985)

Femi
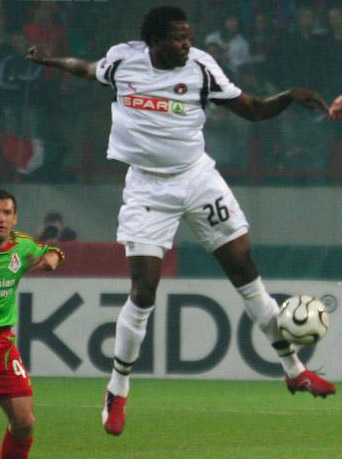
- Femi with Midtjylland in 2007

Personal information
- Full name: Ebenezer Oluwafemi Ajilore
- Date of birth: 18 January 1985 (age 41)
- Place of birth: Atakunmosa West, Nigeria
- Height: 1.84 m (6 ft 0 in)
- Position: Midfielder

Youth career
- –2002: Ebedei
- 2002–2004: Midtjylland

Senior career*
Years	Team	Apps	(Gls)
2004–2008	Midtjylland	76	(4)
2008–2013	Groningen	78	(4)
2011–2012	→ Brøndby (loan)	17	(0)
2013–2015	Midtjylland	2	(0)
2015–2016	Middelfart G&BK		

International career
2008	Nigeria U23	6	(0)
2008–2011	Nigeria	6	(0)
Medal record
Representing Nigeria
Men's Football
Silver medal – second place	2008 Beijing	Team competition
- * Club domestic league appearances and goals

Ebenezer Oluwafemi Ajilore (born 18 January 1985), also known as Femi, is a Nigerian former professional footballer who played as a midfielder.

== Club career ==
Ebenezer Oluwafemi Ajilore was born on 18 January 1985 in Oshu, Atakunmosa West, Nigeria. He progressed through FC Ebedei's youth academy before moving to cooperation club Midtjylland in the Danish Superliga in 2002, becoming the first player to do so. He made his debut for the club on the first matchday of the 2004–05 season, starting in a 2–1 away victory against AaB. On 15 August, he scored his first goal for the club in a 2–1 away loss to Brøndby.

After impressing with Midtjylland, Femi joined Dutch Eredivisie club Groningen in May 2008 on a five-year deal. The fee was undisclosed, but reported to be €3.3 million, the highest transfer fee ever paid by the club. As a result of the high transfer fee, Femi joined amid high expectations. However, he struggled to adapt to his new environment, experiencing significant difficulties on the field during his initial season. Despite these challenges, he briefly showed signs of improvement, but ultimately, his performances never matched the high hopes that accompanied his arrival, and he left the club as his contract expired in 2013. Before that, he went on a one-season loan to Danish club Brøndby in the 2011–12 season, where he also failed to impress.

On 4 December 2013, Femi returned to Midtjylland. Earlier during the autumn, Midtjylland had attempted to re-sign Femi after his contract with Groningen expired, but visa regulations initially prevented his return to Denmark. However, he later joined Midtjylland for training and performed well enough to earn a contract until the summer of 2015. However, he struggled with form and injuries, making only two Superliga appearances before his contract was mutually terminated on 26 January 2015.

On 10 August 2015, Femi joined Danish 2nd Division side Middelfart G&BK for the 2015–16 season. In November 2015, after the club turned professional, Femi signed a contract with them. He left the club at the end of the season, in June 2016.

== International career ==
He played with the Nigeria under-23 team in the 2008 Beijing and won the silver medal. He made his full debut for the Super Eagles against Colombia on 19 November 2008.

== Personal life ==
Femi also holds a Ghanaian passport.

Following his career, Femi moved to Abuja, Nigeria, where he settled with his wife and children.

In 2019, he was studying for a coaching certificate and co-owned FEMAK Football Academy in Ikeja, Lagos, with childhood friends and former football player Stephen Makinwa and Ifeanyi Emeghara.
