= Akilu =

Akilu is both a given name and a surname. Notable people with the name include:

- Akilu Aliyu (1918–1998), Nigerian poet, writer, scholar, and politician
- Halilu Akilu (born 1947), retired Nigerian army officer
- Yakubu Abubakar Akilu (born 1989), Nigerian footballer
