= Frank "The Tank" =

Frank "The Tank" or Frank the Tank may refer to:

- Frank Pritchard, Australian rugby league player
- Frank Kaminsky, American professional basketball player
- Frank Onyeka, Nigerian footballer who plays for Coventry City
- Frank "The Tank" Ricard, a character from the 2003 film Old School, portrayed by Will Ferrell
- Frank "The Tank" Fleming, American sports media personality for Barstool Sports.
