= Frank Onyeka =

Nigerian footballer (born 1998)

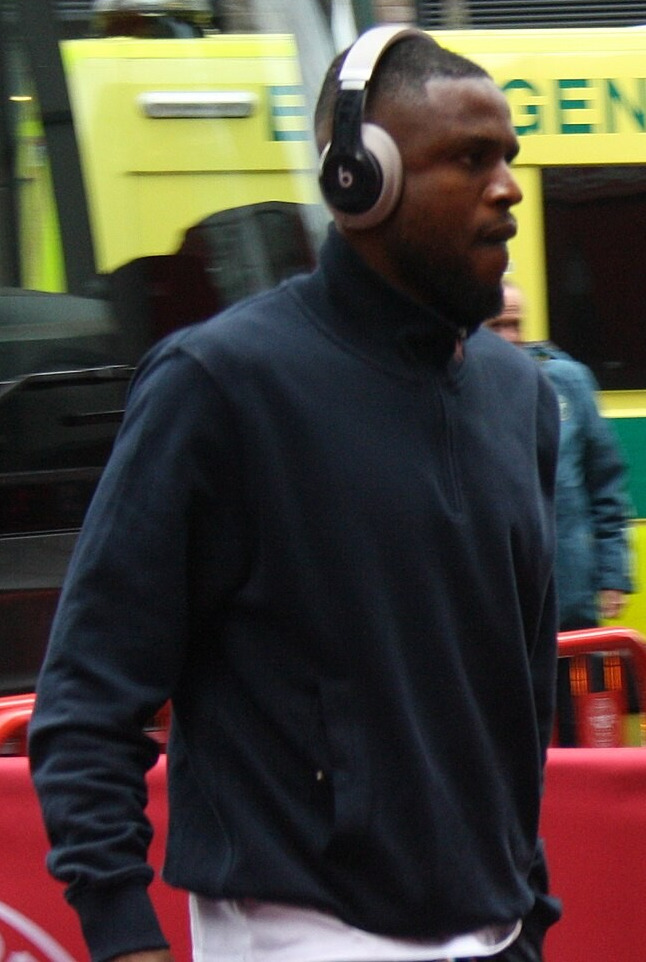
- Onyeka with Brentford in 2025

Personal information
- Full name: Ogochukwu Franklin Onyeka
- Date of birth: 1 January 1998 (age 28)
- Place of birth: Benin City, Nigeria
- Height: 1.83 m (6 ft 0 in)
- Position: Defensive midfielder

Team information
- Current team: Coventry City
- Number: 16

Youth career
- –2013: Faith Motors
- 2013–2016: Ebedei
- 2016–2017: Midtjylland

Senior career*
| Years | Team | Apps | (Gls) |
| 2017–2021 | Midtjylland | 95 | (14) |
| 2021–2026 | Brentford | 75 | (1) |
| 2024–2025 | → FC Augsburg (loan) | 31 | (0) |
| 2026 | → Coventry City (loan) | 14 | (1) |
| 2026– | Coventry City | 8 | (0) |

International career^{‡}
| 2020– | Nigeria | 46 | (3) |
Medal record
Men's football
Representing Nigeria
Africa Cup of Nations
| Runner-up | 2023 Ivory Coast |
| Third place | 2025 Morocco |
- * Club domestic league appearances and goals as of 22:10, 21 August 2026 (UTC) ‡ National team caps and goals as of 29 September 2026

Ogochukwu Franklin Onyeka MON (born 1 January 1998) is a Nigerian professional footballer who plays as a defensive midfielder for Premier League club Coventry City and the Nigeria national team.

== Early life and career ==
Onyeka was born on 1 January 1998 in Benin City, Edo State, Nigeria, the second oldest of five siblings. He has stated that his mother was not supportive of him playing football early on: "She wanted us to study, because the opportunity of becoming a football player at that point was slim. She would rather I went to school than play football."

Aged 15, while playing for local club Faith Motors Academy, he was noticed by Churchill Oliseh, owner and manager of Ebedei—a club with ties to Midtjylland in the Danish Superliga—and the man credited for discovering Nigerian international Obafemi Martins. Before joining Ebedei, Onyeka supported his family by doing roofing work. His move to Ebedei, located in Sagamu, Ogun State, more than 250 kilometers from Benin City, was the first time he was away from home, and required significant adjustments. Despite the distance and his prior responsibilities, Onyeka remained committed to pursuing his dreams, something he later recognised as instrumental in developing a resilient mindset.

== Club career ==
=== Midtjylland ===
After moving from Nigerian club Ebedei to cooperation club Midtjylland in Denmark in January 2016, Onyeka established himself as part of the club, and on 20 September 2017 he made his first-team debut in the Danish Cup in a 7–0 win over Greve, where he also scored. Onyeka went on to make his Danish Superliga debut for the club a few months later in the club's 2017–18 campaign in a match against Horsens on 9 February 2018. There, he also scored, and was a key part in the 2–0 win. Onyeka distinguished himself again in the next fixture, on 18 February, against the leading Superliga team from Copenhagen, where he scored his second league goal for the club at the right winger position as Midtjylland beat the capital side 3–1. He was subsequently praised by head coach Jess Thorup for his positional versatility and maturity.

Onyeka made his UEFA Champions League debut in the following season, in Midtjylland's qualifier against Astana on 24 July 2018.

=== Brentford ===
Onyeka signed for newly promoted Premier League side Brentford on 20 July 2021 for an undisclosed fee. He made his competitive debut for the club on 13 August, the first matchday of the season, starting in a 2–0 victory against Arsenal; the Bees' first ever Premier League win.

During his first seasons at Brentford, he grappled with securing a regular spot in the first team, often sidelined by injuries, and primarily featuring as a substitute. On 7 August 2023, he signed a new four-year contract, keeping him in west London until 2027. He scored his first goal for the club on 13 April 2024, helping Brentford to a 2–0 league win over Sheffield United to claim their first win in 10 consecutive Premier League games.

During a Premier League pronunciations video, he referred to himself as "Frank the Tank".

==== Loan to FC Augsburg ====
On 30 August 2024, Onyeka signed for Bundesliga club FC Augsburg on a season-long loan.

==== Loan to Coventry City ====
On 2 February 2026, Onyeka signed for EFL Championship club Coventry City on loan until the end of the season. The deal included an obligation to buy Onyeka if Coventry were promoted to the Premier League. Onyeka made his debut, starting in a top-of-the-table clash against Middlesbrough, Coventry won 3–1 to move to the top of the Championship.

=== Coventry City ===
On 29 June 2026, Onyeka joined Coventry City on a permanent transfer.

== International career ==
Onyeka received his first call-up for the Nigeria national team on 22 September 2020 for the friendly matches against Algeria and Tunisia in Austria on 5 and 9 October 2020, respectively. He made his debut for the national team in a friendly 1–0 loss to Algeria on 9 October 2020. He scored his first goal for his country on 16 October 2023, in a 3–2 win over Mozambique.

Onyeka was a part of the Nigerian team that emerged runners-up at the 2023 African Cup of Nations. During the tournament, he started all seven of Nigeria's games.

On 11 December 2025, Onyeka was called up to the Nigeria squad for the 2025 Africa Cup of Nations.

== Personal life ==
Onyeka was born in Benin City. He is nicknamed "The Tank".

== Career statistics ==
=== Club ===
As of match played 21 November 2026

Appearances and goals by club, season and competition
| Club | Season | League | | | National cup (Note: Includes Danish Cup, DFB-Pokal) | | League cup (Note: Includes EFL Cup) | | Europe | | Total | |
| Club | Season | Division | Apps | Goals | Apps | Goals | Apps | Goals | Apps | Goals | Apps | Goals |
|---|---|---|---|---|---|---|---|---|---|---|---|---|
| Midtjylland | 2017–18 | Danish Superliga | 15 | 4 | 3 | 1 | — | | — | | 18 | 5 |
| Midtjylland | 2018–19 | Danish Superliga | 21 | 4 | 3 | 0 | — | | 5 (Note: Two appearances in UEFA Champions League, three appearances in UEFA Europa League) | 0 | 29 | 4 |
| Midtjylland | 2019–20 | Danish Superliga | 32 | 3 | 1 | 0 | — | | 2 (Note: Appearances in UEFA Europa League) | 1 | 35 | 4 |
| Midtjylland | 2020–21 | Danish Superliga | 27 | 3 | 4 | 0 | — | | 10 (Note: Appearances in UEFA Champions League) | 1 | 41 | 4 |
| Midtjylland | Total | | 95 | 14 | 11 | 1 | — | | 17 | 2 | 123 | 17 |
| Brentford | 2021–22 | Premier League | 20 | 0 | 0 | 0 | 4 | 0 | — | | 24 | 0 |
| Brentford | 2022–23 | Premier League | 21 | 0 | 0 | 0 | 2 | 0 | — | | 23 | 0 |
| Brentford | 2023–24 | Premier League | 26 | 1 | 0 | 0 | 2 | 0 | — | | 28 | 1 |
| Brentford | 2024–25 | Premier League | 2 | 0 | — | | 1 | 0 | — | | 3 | 0 |
| Brentford | 2025–26 | Premier League | 6 | 0 | 0 | 0 | 3 | 0 | — | | 9 | 0 |
| Brentford | Total | | 75 | 1 | 0 | 0 | 12 | 0 | — | | 87 | 1 |
| FC Augsburg (loan) | 2024–25 | Bundesliga | 31 | 0 | 3 | 0 | — | | — | | 34 | 0 |
| Coventry City (loan) | 2025–26 | Championship | 14 | 1 | — | | — | | — | | 14 | 1 |
| Coventry City | 2026–27 | Premier League | 8 | 0 | 0 | 0 | 1 | 0 | — | | 9 | 0 |
| Career total | | | 223 | 17 | 14 | 1 | 12 | 0 | 17 | 2 | 266 | 20 |

=== International ===
As of match played 29 September 2026

Appearances and goals by national team and year
| National team | Year | Apps | Goals |
|---|---|---|---|
| Nigeria | 2020 | 1 | 0 |
| Nigeria | 2021 | 3 | 0 |
| Nigeria | 2022 | 5 | 0 |
| Nigeria | 2023 | 7 | 1 |
| Nigeria | 2024 | 13 | 0 |
| Nigeria | 2025 | 9 | 2 |
| Nigeria | 2026 | 8 | 0 |
| Total | | 46 | 3 |

Scores and results list Nigeria's goal tally first, score column indicates score after each Onyeka goal.

List of international goals scored by Frank Onyeka
| No. | Date | Venue | Opponent | Score | Result | Competition |
|---|---|---|---|---|---|---|
| 1 | 16 October 2023 | Estádio Municipal de Portimão, Portimão, Portugal | Mozambique | 2–1 | 3–2 | Friendly |
| 2 | 14 October 2025 | Godswill Akpabio International Stadium, Uyo, Nigeria | Benin | 4–0 | 4–0 | 2026 FIFA World Cup qualification |
| 3 | 16 November 2025 | Moulay Hassan Stadium, Rabat, Morocco | DR Congo | 1–0 | 1–1 (a.e.t.) | 2026 FIFA World Cup qualification |

== Honours ==
Midtjylland

- Danish Superliga: 2017–18, 2019–20
- Danish Cup: 2018–19

Coventry City

- EFL Championship: 2025–26

Nigeria

- Africa Cup of Nations runner-up: 2023; third place: 2025

Orders

- Member of the Order of the Niger
