= Akinade =

Akinade is both a given name and a surname. Notable people with the name include:

- Akinade Moses Ibukun (born 2001), Nigerian footballer
- Fatai Akinade Akinbade (born 1955), Nigerian politician
- Fisayo Akinade (born 1987), English actor
- Ismahil Akinade (born 1994), Nigerian footballer
