= Enyinnaya =

- Gender: Male
- Language: Igbo

Origin
- Origin: Nigeria
- Meaning: His father's friend
- Region of origin: Igboland

Enyinnaya audio is an Igbo male given name and surname. It means "his father's friend". The name Enyinnaya is a unique and culturally significant name and primarily used among family friends.

== Notable Individuals with the Name ==
- Enyinnaya Godswill (born 1999), Nigerian professional footballer.
- Hugo Enyinnaya (born 1981), Nigerian footballer.
- Loveday Enyinnaya (born 1989), Nigerian footballer.
- Enyinnaya Abaribe (born 1955), Nigerian politician.
- Daryl Dike (born 2000), Nigerian American professional soccer player.
- Chinedum Orji (1970), Nigerian politician.
