= N'Doram =

N'Doram (Arabic: ندورام) is a surname. Notable people with the surname include:

- Japhet N'Doram (born 1966), Chadian footballer
- Kévin N'Doram (born 1996), French footballer
- Rodrigue N'Doram (born 1987), Chadian footballer
