= Adigun =

- Language: Yoruba

Origin
- Origin: Nigeria
- Region of origin: South western Nigeria

Adigun audio is both a surname and a given name. Notable people with the name include:

- Adebayo Adigun (born 1990), Nigerian footballer
- Seun Adigun (born 1987), Nigerian hurdler
- Adigun Salami (born 1988), Nigerian footballer
