= F.C. Ebedei =

Nigerian football club

FC Ebedei
- Ground: FC Ebedei Stadium, Sagamu, Nigeria
- Chairman: Churchill Oliseh
- Manager: Churchill Oliseh
- League: Nigeria Nationwide League
Home colours

FC Ebedei is a Nigerian football club based in Sagamu, Ogun State. It was previously based in Lagos and Ijebu-Ode. They currently play in the Nigeria Nationwide League, the third tier of Nigerian football.

FC Ebedei is also serving as the African football academy of FC Midtjylland in the Danish Superliga championship. Several players from the club have gone on to play in Denmark.

== FC Midtjylland transfers ==
Several players have transferred to FC Midtjylland from Edebei, including forward Paul Onuachu.

The first player who transferred to FC Midtjylland was Ajilore Oluwafemi. The midfielder debuted for FC Midtjylland in 2004, and earned a permanent place in the starting line-up in the 2006–07 Superliga season. He plays the role of a defensive midfielder.

He was followed by strikers Adeshina Lawal and Justice John Erhenede, though they did not break into the FC Midtjylland starting line-up. In 2004, they both transferred to Vejle BK in the secondary Danish 1st Division.

In the spring 2006, forward Akeem Agbetu earned a place in the FC Midtjylland first team squad, after Danish forward Frank Kristensen suffered an injury. Agbetu scored a couple of goals before he was loaned out to Kolding FC in the winter 2007 transfer window to earn some valuable experience.

In the summer 2006, the two players who were brought with him to the club, the 18-year-old players Adigun Salami and Ayinde Lawal, were brought into the FC Midtjylland squad. Salami proved a very big talent, and attracted attention from Italian club Reggina Calcio, as well as English clubs Chelsea and Manchester United. He plays the role of a defensive midfielder.

The next player to make the step from FC Ebedei to FC Midtjylland is Babajide Collins Babatunde, or simply known a Baba Collins, who would have made his FC Midtjylland debut at age 16 if not for FIFA rules. As he turned 18, he signed a four-and-a-half-year professional contract with FC Midtjylland. In Spring 2007 he earned his debut, and quickly became a starter. He scored 2 goals in 8 matches.

In July 2026, FC Ebedei midfielder Hassan Kashietu completed his move to Danish Superliga club FC Midtjylland, becoming another academy graduate to progress through the long-standing partnership between the two clubs.

=== Recent seasons ===
- 2004: Nigerian Division 1-B 9th
- 2005: Nigerian Division 1-B 15th (Relegated)
- 2006/07: Nigeria Amateur League (Promoted)
- 2007/08: Nigerian Division 1-B 10th
- 2008/09: Nigerian Division 1-B 15th (Relegated)
- 2009/10: Nigeria Amateur League 2nd, Group A (Promoted)
- 2010/11: Nigerian Division 1-B 15th (Relegated)
- 2012: Nigerian Nationwide League 1st, Group A (sold promotion slot to Crown F.C.)

== Notable alumni ==
=== FIFA World Cup participants ===
- (Nigeria) Obafemi Martins (2010)

=== Africa Cup of Nations participants ===
- (Nigeria) Stephen Makinwa (2006, 2008)
- (Nigeria) Obafemi Martins (2006, 2008, 2010)
- (Nigeria) Ifeanyi Emeghara (2008)
- (Benin) Razak Omotoyossi (2008, 2010)
- (Nigeria) Paul Onuachu (2019, 2023, 2025)
- (Nigeria) Frank Onyeka (2021, 2023, 2025)
- (Nigeria) Raphael Onyedika (2023, 2025)

=== Other national team representants ===
- (Nigeria) Oluwafemi Ajilore
- (Nigeria) Sylvester Igboun
- (Liberia) Sekou Oliseh
- (Nigeria) Stephen Sunday
- (Nigeria) Izunna Uzochukwu

=== Other players ===
- (Nigeria) Akeem Agbetu
- (Nigeria) Yakubu Abubakar Akilu
- (Nigeria) David Akintola
- (Nigeria) Musefiu Ashiru
- (Nigeria) Afeez Awakan
- (Nigeria) Babajide Collins Babatunde
- (Nigeria) Ebube Duru
- (Nigeria) Hugo Enyinnaya
- (Nigeria) Justice John Erhenede
- (Nigeria) Ikechukwu Ezeh
- (Nigeria) Rilwan Olanrewaju Hassan
- (Nigeria) Akinade Moses Ibukun
- (Nigeria) Samson Iyede
- (Nigeria) John Kolawole
- (Nigeria) Adeshina Lawal
- (Nigeria) Ayinde Jamiu Lawal
- (Nigeria) Jamiu Musbaudeen
- (Nigeria) Jude Nworuh
- (Nigeria) Emmanuel Odafe
- (Nigeria) Princewill Okachi
- (Nigeria) Echiabhi Okodugha
- (Nigeria) Isaac Oliseh
- (Nigeria) Adeola Lanre Runsewe
- (Nigeria) Adigun Salami
- (Nigeria) Oluwaunmi Somide
- (Nigeria) Henry Uzochukwu
