= Justice John Erhenede =

Nigerian professional football player

Justice Erhenede
Personal information
- Full name: Justice John Erhenede
- Date of birth: 19 August 1986 (age 40)
- Place of birth: Warri, Nigeria
- Height: 1.72 m (5 ft 8 in)
- Position: Attacking midfielder

Team information
- Current team: FC Sønderborg

Youth career
- 1990–1998: AC Uknani School
- 1999–2004: Ebedei

Senior career*
Years	Team	Apps	(Gls)
2004	Midtjylland	37	(2)
2004–2007	Vejle Boldklub	11	(0)
2007–2011	Kolding FC	68	(23)
2011–2012	Hobro	13	(2)
2012–2013	HB Køge	3	(1)
2013	Hobro	2	(0)
2013–2016	Kolding IF		
2018–?	FC Sønderborg		
- * Club domestic league appearances and goals

Justice John Erhenede (born 26 June 1986) is a Nigerian former professional footballer who played as an attacking midfielder.

== Career ==
Erhenede joined Danish club FC Sønderborg in March 2018.

In November 2022 Swedish club Rågsveds IF announced Erhenede as youth coach from 2023.
