= Olise =

Olise is a surname. Notable people with the surname include:

- Michael Olise (born 2001), English-French footballer
- Richard Olise (born 2004), English footballer

== See also ==
- Oliseh
