= Musefiu Ashiru =

Nigerian footballer (born 1994)

Personal information
- Full name: Musefiu Olasunkanmi Ashiru
- Date of birth: 26 June 1994 (age 32)
- Place of birth: Nigeria
- Height: 1.69 m (5 ft 6 1/2 in)
- Position: Winger

Youth career
- FC Ebedei
- FC Midtjylland

Senior career*
Years	Team	Apps	(Gls)
2012–2016	FC Midtjylland	3	(0)
2015	→ Ringkøbing IF (loan)		
2015–2016	→ Skive IK (loan)	21	(1)
2016	Tatran Prešov	14	(5)
2017–2019	FC Zbrojovka Brno	24	(1)
2017	→ Dunajská Streda (loan)	9	(0)
2019	Spartak Trnava	5	(0)
- * Club domestic league appearances and goals as of 24 May 2019

Musefiu Olasunkanmi Ashiru (born 26 June 1994) is a Nigerian professional footballer who plays as a winger. He previously played in Nigeria, Denmark and Slovakia for FC Ebedei, FC Midtjylland, Ringkøbing IF, Skive IK, Tatran Prešov and Dunajská Streda.

== Career ==
Ashiru started his career with FC Ebedei, before signing for FC Midtjylland. In June 2013 he signed a new one-year contract with the club, which was extended in January 2014 by a further three years. In February 2015, Ashiru was loaned out to Ringkøbing IF until the summer of 2015. He also spent a loan spell at Skive IK. After a spell in Slovakia with Tatran Prešov, he signed a long-term contract with Czech club Zbrojovka Brno in December 2016. In February 2019, he signed for Spartak Trnava.

== Honours ==
Spartak Trnava

- Slovak Cup: 2018–19
