= John Kolawole =

Nigerian footballer (born 2004)

Personal information
- Full name: John Oluwatomiwa Kolawole
- Date of birth: 24 July 2004 (age 22)
- Place of birth: Nigeria
- Position: Midfielder

Team information
- Current team: Esbjerg fB
- Number: 14

Youth career
- –2022: FC Ebedei
- 2022–2025: Mafra

Senior career*
Years	Team	Apps	(Gls)
2024–2025	Mafra	15	(0)
2025–	Esbjerg fB	24	(8)

International career
2021	Nigeria U17		
- * Club domestic league appearances and goals as of 2 June 2026

John Oluwatomiwa Kolawole (born 24 July 2004) is a Nigerian footballer who plays as a midfielder for Danish 1st Division club Esbjerg fB.

== Club career ==
Kolawole began his career at FC Ebedei in Nigeria. At the age of 17, he was invited to a football camp at FC Midtjylland, the Danish partner club of FC Ebedei. In the summer of 2022, Kolawole also played training matches for the Danish club.

That same summer, in August 2022, the 18-year-old Kolawole instead signed with Liga Portugal 2 club C.D. Mafra, a club that shared the same owners as FC Midtjylland and has often been used as a feeder club for Midtjylland. At Mafra, however, he was primarily used on the club's U-23 team, but was also noted for 16 appearances for the first team, all of which came during the 2024–25 season.

On 1 September 2025, it was confirmed that Kolawole had transferred to the Danish 1st Division club Esbjerg fB on a contract running until June 2029.

== International career ==
Kolawole represented the national U17 team of Nigeria at the WAFU B U17 tournament in Lomé, Togo last year, where the team lost the final of the tournament.
