= Ikechukwu Ezeh =

Nigerian footballer (born 1987)

Ike Ezeh
Personal information
- Full name: Ikechukwu Ezeh Ugwuzor
- Date of birth: 20 December 1987 (age 38)
- Place of birth: Oyo, Nigeria
- Height: 1.92 m (6 ft 3 1/2 in)
- Position: Forward

Senior career*
Years	Team	Apps	(Gls)
- Sharks Port Harcourt
- Niger Tornadoes
2005–2006	Ebedei		
2006–2008	Hajduk Beograd	14	(0)
2008	Väsby United	0	(0)
2008–2009	Kom Podgorica	27	(9)
2009–2010	Napredak Kruševac	8	(0)
2010–2011	Dečić Tuzi	34	(1)
2011	Jezero Plav	7	(1)
- * Club domestic league appearances and goals as of 14 June 2012

Ikechukwu Ezeh Ugwuzor (born 20 December 1987, in Oyo) is a Nigerian professional football striker last playing with FK Jezero in the Montenegrin Second League.

== Career ==
During his career, beside Sharks F.C., Niger Tornadoes F.C., and FC Ebedei in Nigeria, he represented the Serbian clubs FK Hajduk Beograd (Serbian First League) and FK Napredak Kruševac (Serbian SuperLiga), Swedish FC Väsby United, and Montenegrin FK Kom and FK Dečić in the Montenegrin First League.

== External sources ==
- Profile and photo at Napredak official website
- Stats from Montenegro at FSCG.co.me
- Player´s video on YouTube
