= Princewill Okachi =

Nigerian footballer

Personal information
- Full name: Princewill Ushie Okachi
- Date of birth: 20 June 1991 (age 35)
- Place of birth: Lagos, Nigeria
- Height: 1.68 m (5 ft 6 in)
- Position: Midfielder

Youth career
- 2006–2007: FC Ebedei
- 2007–2009: Midtjylland
- 2009–2010: Vejle

Senior career*
Years	Team	Apps	(Gls)
2010–2011	Dingli Swallows	12	(5)
2011–2012	→ Widzew Łódź (loan)	28	(2)
2012–2014	Widzew Łódź	55	(1)
2014	Panthrakikos	3	(0)
2015–2016	Widzew Łódź	48	(9)
2017–2018	Stal Niewiadów	7	(0)
2018	Pelikan Łowicz	15	(1)
2019	Oskar Przysucha	12	(2)
2019–2022	Pogoń Zduńska Wola	63	(26)
2023	Lider Włocławek	5	(0)
- * Club domestic league appearances and goals as of 20 June 2024

Princewill Ushie Okachi (born 20 June 1991), or simply Prince, is a Nigerian professional footballer who plays as a midfielder.

== Career ==
He started his professional career in Dingli Swallows as a striker. In 2011 he moved to Widzew Łódź, on a one-year loan deal. He made his debut in Ekstraklasa on 5 August 2011. After three years spent in Widzew, where he was utilized mainly as a midfielder, his contract was terminated due to financial issues. In September 2014, he signed a contract with Panthrakikos, where he played in 3 games in the Greek Superleague. However, in early 2015 he decided to come back to Poland to his family, and closer to his daughter in Denmark.

In July 2015, he returned to Widzew Łódź, in order to help rebuild the team after bankruptcy and relegation to the fifth division.

== Honours ==
Widzew Łódź

- IV liga Łódź: 2015–16
