= Oladipupo Martins =

Nigerian footballer

Personal information
- Full name: Oladipupo Olarotimi Martins
- Date of birth: 12 April 1983
- Place of birth: Lagos, Nigeria
- Date of death: 8 August 2011 (aged 28)
- Place of death: Lagos, Nigeria
- Height: 1.74 m (5 ft 8 1/2 in)
- Position: Striker

Youth career
- –2000: First Bank FC

Senior career*
Years	Team	Apps	(Gls)
2000–2001	Reggiana	12	(1)
2001–2002	Inter Milan	0	(0)
2003–2004	Partizan	0	(0)
2003–2004	→ Teleoptik (loan)	9	(0)
2005–2006	WAC St. Andrä	38	(4)
2007	NEPA Lagos	9	(0)
2007–2009	Innsbrucker AC	12	(4)
2009–2011	University of Ado Ekiti		
- * Club domestic league appearances and goals

Oladipupo Olarotimi Martins (12 April 1983 – 9 August 2011) was a professional Nigerian footballer who last played as a forward for University of Ado Ekiti, a non professional side.

He died of a suspected heart attack at the Dorel Specialist Hospital, Ajah, Lagos on Monday, 8 August 2011, after being admitted complaining of chest pains the previous day. He was 28.

== Career ==
Martins started his European career with Italian side Reggiana before quickly attracting the attention of Inter Milan whom he signed for in 2001. Unlike his brother, Martins did not thrive at Inter and was released at the end of the 2001–02 season. He returned to Nigeria but soon found himself heading back to Europe, this time for a trial with Serbian side FK Partizan. His hard work was rewarded and in 2003 he signed a professional contract. His opportunities at Partizan were limited and most of his opportunities to play ended up being for the satellite FK Teleoptik. In 2004, he was released from his contract and returned to Nigeria again, this time for an extended period before he finally signing for Austrian side Innsbrucker AC in time for the 2007–08 season after a trial period and joined University of Ado Ekiti in February 2009.

== Personal life ==
Martins was the older brother of Nigerian international striker Obafemi Martins.
