= Isaac Oliseh =

Nigerian footballer

Personal information
- Full name: Isaac Oliseh
- Date of birth: 3 August 1993 (age 33)
- Place of birth: Nigeria
- Height: 1.72 m (5 ft 8 in)
- Position: Midfielder

Team information
- Current team: Jomala IK
- Number: 38

Youth career
- FC Ebedei

Senior career*
Years	Team	Apps	(Gls)
2013–2014	Midtjylland	1	(0)
2014	→ Thisted (loan)		
2015–	Jomala IK		
- * Club domestic league appearances and goals as of 24 November 2013

Isaac Oliseh (born 3 August 1993) is a Nigerian footballer who plays as a midfielder for Jomala IK in Finland.
