= Jamiu Musbaudeen =

Nigerian footballer (born 2004)

Personal information
- Full name: Jamiu Olaide Musbaudeen
- Date of birth: 9 July 2004 (age 22)
- Place of birth: Nigeria
- Height: 1.90 m (6 ft 3 in)
- Position: Midfielder

Team information
- Current team: Moss
- Number: 14

Youth career
- –2022: FC Ebedei
- 2022–2023: Midtjylland
- 2023–2025: Mafra

Senior career*
Years	Team	Apps	(Gls)
2023	Midtjylland	1	(0)
2023–2025	Mafra	0	(0)
2024–2025	→ Kolding (loan)	18	(0)
2025–	Moss	41	(1)
- * Club domestic league appearances and goals as of 14 November 2026

Jamiu Olaide Musbaudeen (born 9 July 2004) is a Nigerian professional footballer who plays as a centre-back for Norwegian club Moss.

== Career ==
=== Midtjylland ===
18-year-old Musbaudeen joined Danish club FC Midtjylland in the summer from partner club FC Ebedei back home in Nigeria, and quickly became a regular part of the club's successful U19 team. On 5 January 2023, Musbaudeen signed a new five-year contract with Midtjylland.

On 3 June 2023, Musbaudeen was selected for the first time for a match for Midtjylland's first team against Odense Boldklub in the Danish Superliga. He made his official debut in the same match when he came on in injury time to replace Emiliano Martínez.

=== Mafra ===
On 3 August 2023, it was confirmed that Musbaudeen transferred to Portuguese Liga Portugal 2 side Mafra In his first season at the club, 19-year-old Musbaudeen played exclusively for the club's U-23 team.

On July 30, 2024 Musbaudeen returned to Denmark when he joined Danish 1st Division club Kolding IF on a one-year loan deal. He returned to Mafra at the end of his loan spell.

=== Moss ===
In July 2025, Musbaudeen went on a trial at Norwegian club Sarpsborg 08 FF. However, he signed with fellow country club Moss FK on 31 July 2025 on a contract running until June 2028.
