= Ayinde Jamiu Lawal =

Nigerian footballer (born 1988)

Ayinde Lawal
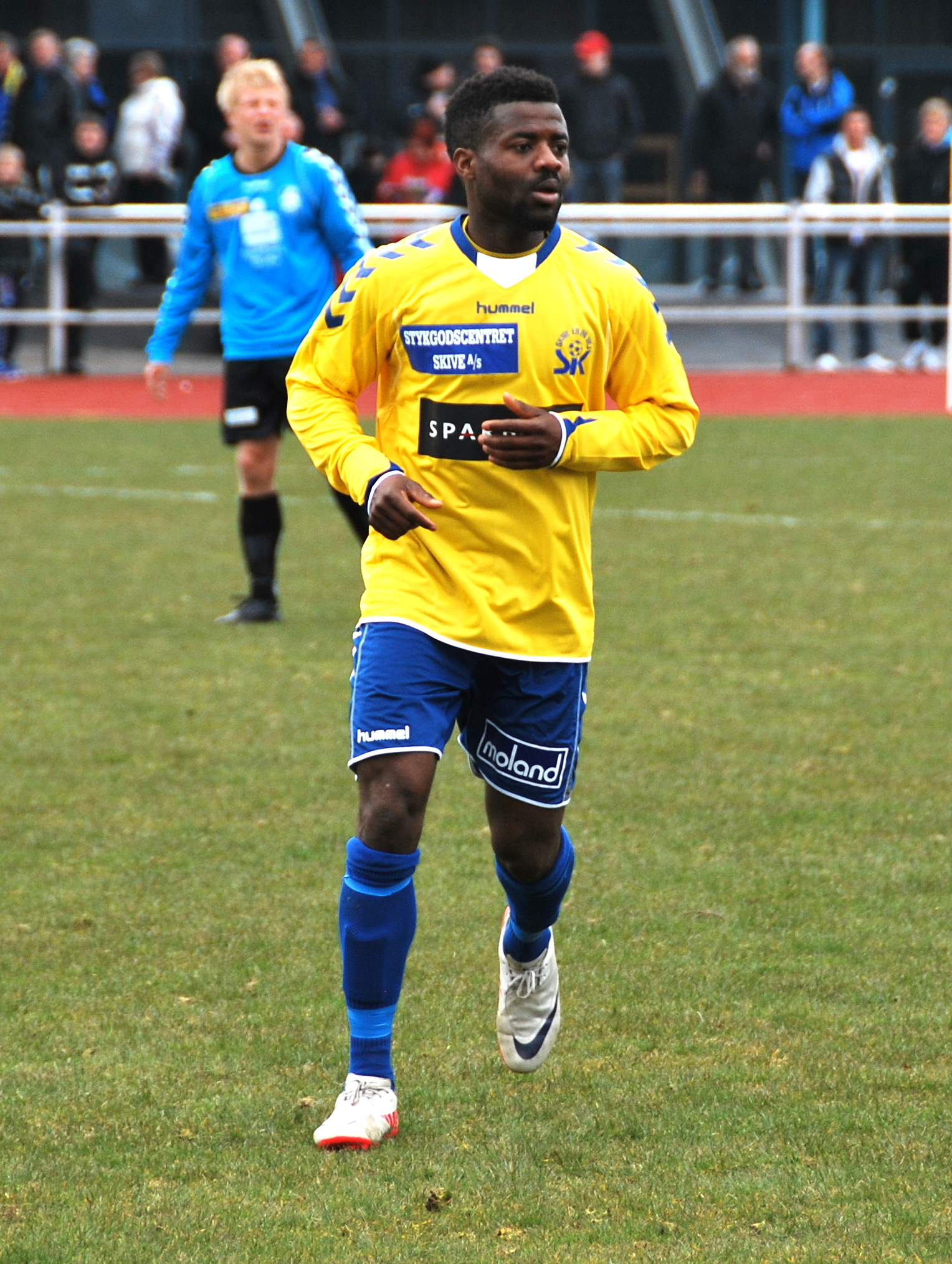
- Lawal in 2012

Personal information
- Full name: Ayinde Jamiu Lawal
- Date of birth: 12 May 1988 (age 38)
- Place of birth: Lagos, Nigeria
- Height: 1.75 m (5 ft 9 in)
- Position: Midfielder

Team information
- Current team: Skive II

Youth career
- –2004: Ebedei
- 2005–2006: Midtjylland

Senior career*
Years	Team	Apps	(Gls)
2006–2007	Ikast FS	3	(0)
2007–2008	Midtjylland	1	(0)
2007–2008	→ SønderjyskE (loan)	0	(0)
2008–2009	→ Skive (loan)	17	(1)
2009–2013	Skive	94	(12)
2013–2015	Fredericia	31	(1)
2014–2015	→ Skive (loan)	28	(0)
2015–2018	Skive	73	(2)
2021–	Skive II		
- * Club domestic league appearances and goals as of 21 August 2021

Ayinde Jamiu Lawal (born 12 May 1988) is a Nigerian professional football midfielder who plays for Jutland Series club Skive II, the reserve team of Skive IK.

== Career ==
In February 2021, began playing at amateur level when he joined the reserve team of Skive IK competing in the fifth-tier Jutland Series. He had earlier had different spells at Skive, becoming their first full-time professional in 2009 after he had signed from Midtjylland, and winning Player of the Year award in 2011.

== Personal life ==
After his professional career, Lawal studied to become a social and health care assistant.
