= Emmanuel Odafe =

Nigerian footballer (born 1992)

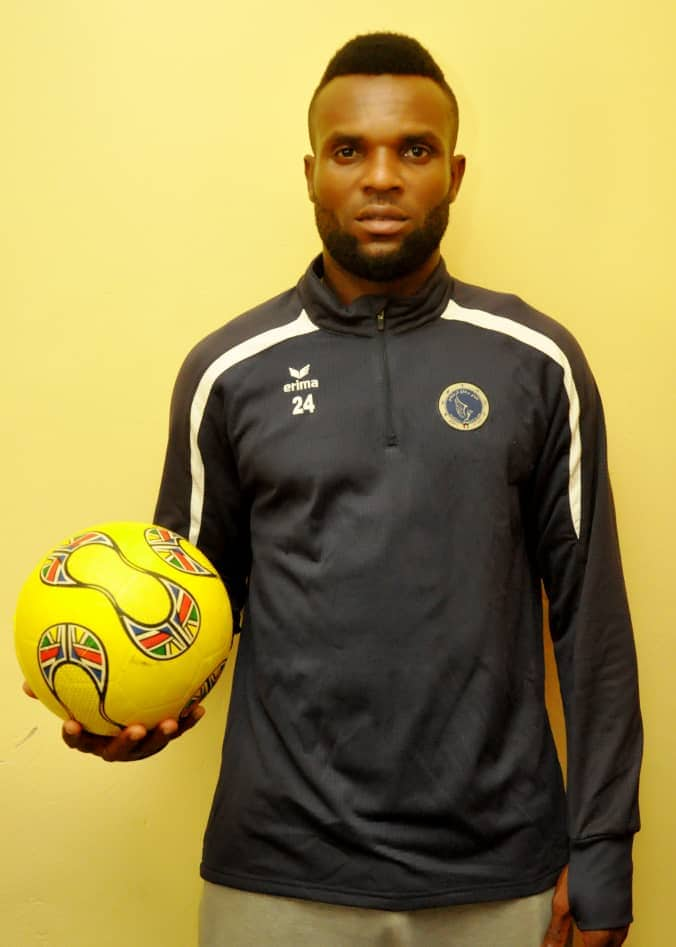
- Emmanuel Odafe at Plateau United FC

Personal information
- Full name: Emmanuel Odafe Amos
- Date of birth: 5 May 1992 (age 34)
- Place of birth: Delta State, Nigeria
- Height: 1.85 m (6 ft 1 in)
- Position: Striker

Team information
- Current team: Plateau United

Senior career*
Years	Team	Apps	(Gls)
2008–2009	Ebedei	23	(9)
2009–2012	First Bank	23	(15)
2012–2014	Plateau United	15	(5)
2015–2016	Kufa	15	(9)
2016–2017	Cihangir GSK	8	(4)
2017	Plateau United	8	(5)
2018–2019	Plateau United	12	(9)
- * Club domestic league appearances and goals

Emmanuel Odafe (born 5 May 1992 in Delta state, Nigeria) is a Nigerian footballer. He currently plays for Plateau United FC, which competes in the Nigerian Professional Football League, the top division in Nigeria. He plays as a striker. A fast and skillful player able to operate at both flanks, Odafo can also play as a point man, as a left and right side attacker. At Plateau United FC he mainly plays as an attacker in a 4-3-2 formation.

== Career ==
He began his career in 2007 with his homeclub Emordi Youth Football Academy before leaving in 2008 to FC Ebedei in Ogun State. After one season, he moved in January 2009 to First Bank F.C. in Nigeria Premier League, and managed to convert 15 goals in 23 games played. He had a short stay at Plateau United FC 2012-14 before moving to Iraqi Premier League club Kufa FC.

=== Cihangir GSK (2016-2017) ===
In July 2017, Odafe moved to Northern Cyprus where he secure a year contract with Cihangir GSK with an option of renewal at the end of the season but had a short stint. He made 8 appearances for the club in the Süper Lig (previously Birinci Lig).

=== Back to Plateau United FC (2017) ===
In the second half of 2017–18 season, Odafe re-joined fellow Nigerian Professional Football League side Plateau United FC, He scored a brace which earned Plateau United three points in their 23rd league match of 2017, as they came from behind to win 2–1 at Sunshine Stars.

== Honours ==
=== Club ===
- Emordi Youth Football: State Challenge Cup: 2007
- Plateau United FC: Nigerian Professional Football League: winners 2017

=== Individual ===
- Plateau United FC: Player of the month of April (1): 2017
