= Yakubu Abubakar Akilu =

Nigerian footballer (born 1989)

Abu Akilu
Personal information
- Full name: Yakubu Abubakar Akilu
- Date of birth: 14 March 1989 (age 37)
- Place of birth: Ago Iwoye, Nigeria
- Height: 1.74 m (5 ft 9 in)
- Position: Defensive midfielder

Youth career
- Ebedei

Senior career*
Years	Team	Apps	(Gls)
2007–2009	Midtjylland	4	(0)
2009	→ Hjørring (loan)	11	(1)
2010	Kolding FC	13	(0)
2011–2014	Fredericia		
2015–2016	Prespa Birlik		
2018–2019	Rågsveds IF	10	(0)
2020–	Västerhaninge IF	13	(0)
- * Club domestic league appearances and goals

Yakubu Abubakar Akilu (born 14 March 1989) is a Nigerian footballer who plays as a defensive midfielder for Västerhaninge IF.

== Career ==
A pacy young midfielder who scored many goals for Ebedei, he was the ninth player who moved from the club to Midtjylland. He played the 2009–10 season for FC Hjørring, on loan from Midtjylland. On 22 December 2010, Akilu left Kolding FC and signed for FC Fredericia.

In June 2018, Akilu joined Swedish club KSF Prespa Birlik. He would later play lower-level football in Sweden for Rågsveds IF and Västerhaninge IF.
