= Hugo Enyinnaya =

Nigerian footballer (born 1981)

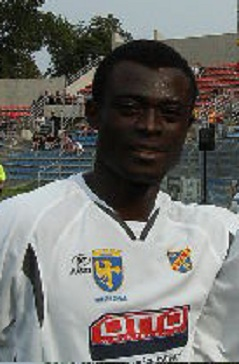

Personal information
- Full name: Ugochukwu Michael Enyinnaya
- Date of birth: 8 May 1981 (age 45)
- Place of birth: Warri, Nigeria
- Height: 1.80 m (5 ft 11 in)
- Position: Forward

Senior career*
| Years | Team | Apps | (Gls) |
| 1997–1998 | Dolphins FC | | |
| 1998 | Eagle Cement | 31 | (3) |
| 1998 | FC Ebedei | | |
| 1998–1999 | Molenbeek | 20 | (6) |
| 1999–2002 | Bari | 33 | (4) |
| 2002–2003 | → Livorno (loan) | 17 | (2) |
| 2004 | → Foggia (loan) | 7 | (1) |
| 2004–2005 | Górnik Zabrze | 4 | (0) |
| 2005–2006 | Lechia Zielona Góra | | (6) |
| 2006–2008 | Odra Opole | 53 | (17) |
| 2009 | Anziolavinio | | |
| 2009–2010 | Meda | | |
| 2010–2011 | Zagarolo | | |
- * Club domestic league appearances and goals

Ugochukwu Michael "Hugo" Enyinnaya (born 8 May 1981) is a Nigerian former professional footballer who played as a forward.

== Career ==
Enyinnaya started his career with Eagle Cement, where he made his debut at the age of 16. He was then loaned out to FC Ebedei, being subsequently signed in the summer of 1998 by Belgian Second Division side Molenbeek. Noted by Carlo Regalia, scout of then-Serie A club Bari, he was then signed in 1999 by the galletti in a 200mln ₤ bid, and initially joined the Under-20 Primavera squad, where he formed a striking partnership with a young Antonio Cassano. He marked his Serie A debut on 17 October 1999 in a home match against Torino. On 18 December he was first featured in the starting lineup, together with Cassano, in a home league match against Internazionale, which ended in a surprising 2–1 win for Bari thanks to goals from Enyinnaya (a 30-meter shot during the 7th minute) and a late winner by Cassano.

Enyinnaya later failed to gain a spot in the regular lineup, unlike Cassano. In 2002 he was loaned to Serie B side Livorno, where he scored only two goals in 17 matches. He returned to Bari in 2003, but failed to impress, being loaned again, this time to Serie C1's Foggia, in January 2004. In July 2004 his contract expired, and Enyinnaya subsequently joined Górnik Zabrze under request by then-chairman Marek Koźmiński. Adaptation difficulties however affected his performances, and Enyinnaya played only five times with the Polish side. He then moved to third-tier club Lechia Zielona Góra in 2005 and after that, to Odra Opole in 2006.

In January 2009 Enyinnaya returned to Italy by accepting an offer from amateur Eccellenza club A.S.D. Anziolavinio. In July 2009 he moved to another Eccellenza club, Meda.

== Sources ==
- "Hugo Enyinnaya, la perla nera del Bari" (in Italian). TuttoMercatoWeb. 2007-08-02.
- Profile at Lega Calcio
