= Stephen Makinwa =

Nigerian footballer

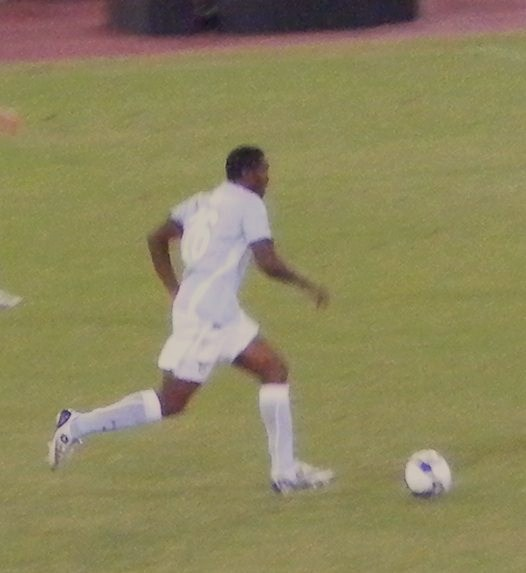
- Makinwa with Lazio

Personal information
- Full name: Stephen Ayodele Makinwa
- Date of birth: 26 July 1983 (age 43)
- Place of birth: Lagos, Nigeria
- Height: 1.86 m (6 ft 1 in)
- Position: Forward

Youth career
- Ebedei

Senior career*
Years	Team	Apps	(Gls)
2000–2001	Reggiana	0	(0)
2000–2001	→ Conegliano (loan)	8	(2)
2001–2002	Como	0	(0)
2002–2003	Reggiana	29	(6)
2003–2005	Genoa	18	(6)
2003–2004	→ Como (loan)	21	(6)
2004	→ Modena (loan)	17	(1)
2005	Atalanta	17	(6)
2005–2006	Palermo	23	(5)
2006–2012	Lazio	45	(3)
2008	→ Reggina (loan)	9	(0)
2009	→ Chievo (loan)	9	(1)
2010–2011	→ AEL (loan)	10	(1)
2012–2013	Carrarese	13	(6)
2013–2014	Beijing Baxy	11	(4)
2014	Gorica	5	(1)

International career
2004–2008	Nigeria	19	(2)
- * Club domestic league appearances and goals

Stephen Ayodele Makinwa (born 26 July 1983) is a Nigerian former professional footballer who played as a forward. Makinwa also played for the Nigeria national team. His name, Ayodele, means "Joy has come home".

== Club career ==
=== Early career ===
Makinwa was born in Lagos, Nigeria. Discovered in 2000 by Reggiana while playing for Nigerian local side Ebedei alongside his childhood friend and teammate Obafemi Martins, Makinwa started his Italian football experience moving on loan to Serie D team Conegliano.

In 2001, he moved to Serie B team Como squad, as Como bought 50% of the rights to the player, however, Makinwa did not play any games for the team.

In 2002, he was back to Reggiana, in Serie C1, but the following season he was again in Como, but now as a regular.

=== Genoa and loans ===
Como bought the remainder of the 50% ownership rights from Reggiana in June and sold him to Genoa in August 2003. In the first half of the season, he was remained on loan at Como. In January 2004 Makinwa was loaned to Modena and made his debut in Serie A. In the 2004–05 season, he returned to Genoa and scored 6 goals in the first half of the Serie B season. That season, Genoa also owned effective strikers Diego Milito and Roberto Stellone.

=== Atalanta & Palermo ===
In January 2005 Makinwa moved to Atalanta in a joint-ownership bid, but Atalanta was relegated in June 2005, although the club decided to buy the remaining rights on 27 June.

In July 2005, Makinwa joined Palermo for a reported €7.5 million transfer fee. He only remained at Palermo for a season, however he showed enough promise to suggest that he could develop into a quality Serie A player, scoring 5 goals in 23 league matches as Palermo qualified for Europe and 3 goals in the Uefa cup.

=== Lazio ===
Makinwa then went to S.S. Lazio in summer 2006, on a co-ownership deal for €3.3 million, being reunited with Delio Rossi, his former coach at Atalanta. In June 2007, he was fully contracted by Lazio, following a blind auction between the biancocelesti and Palermo, for another €3.3 million. He also signed a new five-year contract.

In 2007–08, Makinwa got his first experience of the UEFA Champions League, failing to score as Lazio crashed out in the group stages. Following six months of unconvincing performances, Lazio sent him on loan to relegation battlers Reggina, but he still did not find the net, ending the season without a goal to his name.

He began the 2008–09 season as a fringe player at Lazio; making just four substitute appearances.

On 22 January 2009, it was announced that Makinwa had signed for Chievo until the end of the 2008–09 season, for €250,000. The deal was a loan, with an option of making the move permanent, although Chievo decided not to sign the Nigerian and he returned to Lazio for the 2009–10

=== AE Larisa ===
On 15 July 2010, Makinwa joined AEL on loan from Lazio until the end of the season.

=== Beijing Baxy ===
Following the end of his contract with Lazio, Makinwa joined China League One side Beijing Baxy until the end of the 2014 season scoring 4 goals in his first 9 games.

=== Gorica ===
In July 2014 he was signed by Slovenian side ND Gorica.

== International career ==
Makinwa played for the Nigerian national team and won 14 caps since making his debut in 2004.

He played for Nigeria in the 2006 African Cup of Nations when they finished third. Two years on, he played in the side which again failed to win, losing at the 2008 African Cup of Nations to Ghana.

Both Makinwa and his national teammate Obafemi Martins, are known for celebrating goals by making several consecutive somersaults.

== Career statistics ==
Appearances and goals by club, season and competition
Club	Season	League		
Club	Season	Division	Apps	Goals
Conegliano (loan)	2000–01		8	2
Como	2001–02	Serie B	0	0
Reggiana	2002–03	Serie C1	28	6
Como (loan)	2003–04	Serie B	21	6
Modena (loan)	2003–04	Serie A	16	1
Genoa	2004–05	Serie B	18	6
Atalanta	2004–05	Serie A	17	6
Palermo	2005–06	Serie A	23	5
Lazio	2006–07	Serie A	25	3
Lazio	2007–08	Serie A	14	0
Lazio	2008–09	Serie A	4	0
Lazio	2009–10	Serie A	2	0
Lazio	Total		45	3
Reggina (loan)	2007–08	Serie A	9	0
ChievoVerona (loan)	2008–09	Serie A	9	1
AEL (loan)	2010–11	Super League Greece	10	1
Career total			204	36

=== International ===
Appearances and goals by national team and year
National team	Year	Apps	Goals
Nigeria	2004	1	1
Nigeria	2005	5	0
Nigeria	2006	3	0
Nigeria	2007	7	1
Nigeria	2008	3	0
Total		19	2

Scores and results list Nigeria's goal tally first, score column indicates score after each Makinwa goal.

List of international goals scored by Stephen Makinwa
No.	Date	Venue	Opponent	Score	Result	Competition
1	17 November 2004	Ellis Park Stadium, Johannesburg, South Africa	South Africa	1–2	1–2	2004 Nelson Mandela Challenge
2	8 September 2007	Warri Stadium, Warri, Nigeria	Lesotho	1–0	2–0	2008 Africa Cup of Nations qualification
