= Adigun Salami =

Nigerian footballer (born 1988)

Personal information
- Full name: Adigun Taofeek Salami
- Date of birth: 6 May 1988 (age 38)
- Place of birth: Lagos, Nigeria
- Height: 1.72 m (5 ft 8 in)
- Position: Defensive midfielder

Youth career
- Ebedei
- 2004–2006: Midtjylland

Senior career*
Years	Team	Apps	(Gls)
2004–2006	Ikast	7	(2)
2006–2012	Midtjylland	106	(2)
2012–2015	SønderjyskE	2	(0)
2016–2018	Middelfart		
- * Club domestic league appearances and goals

Adigun Taofeek Salami (born 6 May 1988) is a Nigerian former professional footballer who played as a defensive midfielder.

== Club career ==
Salami was born in Lagos, Nigeria.

Adigun came to FC Midtjylland from their Nigerian football academy FC Ebedei. In the winter 2006–07 and in January 2008 he went on trials at English club Chelsea. However, on 30 October 2008 he signed a new contract running to 30 June 2012.

He joined SønderjyskE on a free transfer on 1 June 2012. Throughout his time there, he struggled with knee problems.

In 2016, Salami joined Middelfart in the Danish 2nd Division. He left the club in June 2018, and subsequently retired from football due to persistent injuries.

== International career ==
On 19 October 2008, Salami told the Danish press that he did not find it inconceivable to join the Denmark national team, should he be granted Danish citizenship.
