= Akinade Moses Ibukun =

Nigerian footballer

Personal information
- Date of birth: 12 February 2001 (age 25)
- Place of birth: Ibadan, Nigeria
- Height: 1.76 m (5 ft 9 in)
- Position: Centre-forward

Team information
- Current team: Soda City

Senior career*
Years	Team	Apps	(Gls)
2016–2018	Ebedei		
2018–2019	Heartland	7	(0)
2019–2021	Binatlı Yılmaz	33	(13)
2021	Bahrain SC		
2021–2022	Yenicami Ağdelen	17	(2)
2022	Kwara United	4	(0)
2022–2023	Tala'ea El Gaish	3	(0)
2023	→ Baladiyat El Mahalla (loan)		
2024–	Soda City		
- * Club domestic league appearances and goals as of 31 January 2025

Akinade Moses Ibukun (born 12 February 2001) is a Nigerian footballer who plays as a centre-forward for United Premier Soccer League club Soda City FC.

== Club career ==
Akinade started playing as a senior for Ebedei in 2016. On 1 January 2018, Akinade joined Nigeria Professional Football League side Heartland F.C.

=== Northern Cyprus ===
Akindate joined Binatlı Yılmaz S.K. in the 2019-2020 summer transfer window.

=== Bahrain ===
After a Qatar deal fell out, he joined Bahrain SC for a period of two-year.
