= Azubuike Oliseh =

Nigerian footballer

Personal information
- Full name: Azubuike Oliseh
- Date of birth: 18 November 1978 (age 47)
- Place of birth: Warri, Nigeria
- Height: 1.80 m (5 ft 11 in)
- Positions: Defender; midfielder

Senior career*
Years	Team	Apps	(Gls)
1995	Julius Berger FC		
1995–1999	Anderlecht	17	(1)
1999–2001	Utrecht	35	(1)
2001	Jokerit	10	(2)
2001–2002	Utrecht	2	(0)
2002–2005	RBC Roosendaal	92	(0)
2005–2008	AEK Larnaca	53	(3)
2008–2009	Roeselare	41	(2)
2009–2010	OH Leuven	31	(1)
2010–2011	Ermis Aradippou		

International career
2000	Nigeria	1	(0)
- * Club domestic league appearances and goals as of 1 July 2009

Azubuike Cosmas Sunday Oliseh Jr. (born 18 November 1978) is a Nigerian former football midfielder. He last played for Ermis Aradippou in the Cypriot First Division. He is the younger brother of retired Nigeria captain Sunday Oliseh and the older brother of the former AS Nancy and QPR midfielder Egutu Oliseh; another brother is Churchill Oliseh and his nephew is Sekou Oliseh.

Azubuike joined his compatriots Celestine Babayaro and James Obiorah at Anderlecht, as a 16-year-old. Looking for regular first team action, Oliseh was loaned out to Royal Antwerp for the 1998–99 season, before moving to the Dutch Eredivisie the following year.
