= Sekou Oliseh =

Liberian professional footballer (born 1990)

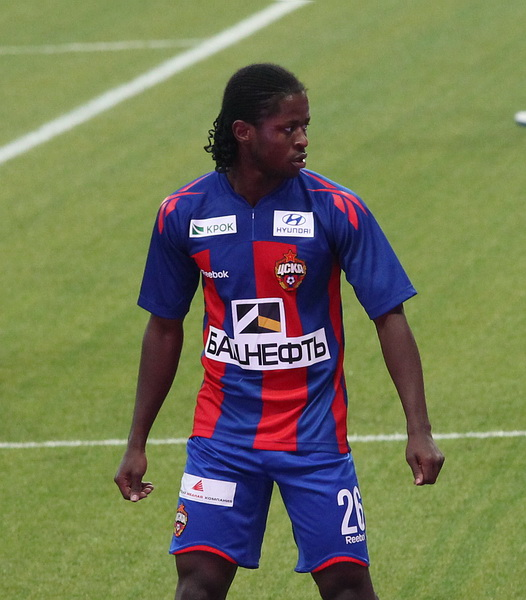
- Oliseh playing for CSKA Moscow in 2011

Personal information
- Full name: Sekou Jabateh Oliseh
- Date of birth: 5 June 1990 (age 36)
- Place of birth: Monrovia, Liberia
- Position: Right winger

Youth career
- Ebedei
- 2006–2008: Midtjylland

Senior career*
Years	Team	Apps	(Gls)
2008–2009	Midtjylland	5	(0)
2009	→ CSKA Moscow (loan)	5	(1)
2010–2015	CSKA Moscow	65	(3)
2013–2014	→ PAOK (loan)	23	(4)
2014–2015	→ Kuban Krasnodar (loan)	12	(4)
2015	Al-Gharafa	0	(0)
2016	Astra Giurgiu	0	(0)
2016	Dalian Yifang	10	(0)
2020	LISCR	2	(0)

International career
2010–2014	Liberia	17	(2)
- * Club domestic league appearances and goals as of 06:41, 24 June 2024 (UTC)

Sekou Jabateh Oliseh (born 5 June 1990) is a Liberian former professional footballer who played as a right winger.

== Early and personal life ==
Born in Monrovia, Liberia, Oliseh was adopted by Nigerian former professional footballer Churchill Oliseh at a young age. His uncles are fellow footballers Azubuike Oliseh, Egutu Oliseh and Sunday Oliseh.

== Club career ==
=== Early career ===
Oliseh began his career in his adopted home country Nigeria with Ebedei, before moving to Danish side Midtjylland in 2006. Between 2008 and 2009, Oliseh made 5 league appearances for Midtjylland, before moving on loan to Russian side CSKA Moscow in July 2009. In December 2009, the loan deal became permanent as Oliseh signed a 5-year deal with CSKA.

=== CSKA Moscow ===
Oliseh made his debut for CSKA on 4 October 2009 against Kuban Krasnodar and scored his first goal on the same day. He entered the match as a substitute for striker Tomáš Necid in the 70th minute and scored nine minutes later to complete a 4–0 victory for the Army men. He then made his UEFA Champions League debut as a substitute against Beşiktaş on 8 December 2009, replacing Miloš Krasić in the 82nd minute at the BJK İnönü Stadium.

However, he was not able to secure a first team spot in 2010, due to the presence of fellow attacking midfielder Krasić. Following Krasić's transfer saga to Juventus, Oliseh received a rare start and did not disappoint. He scored a double in the first half against Anzhi Makhachkala on 15 August 2010, tallying in the 12th minute and then just before halftime for manager Leonid Slutskiy's squad. Another winning goal followed on 20 September, scoring the only goal in the home victory against Sibir Novosibirsk.

Oliseh joined Greek club PAOK on loan in January 2013, with the deal being in extended in July 2013. Oliseh again went out on loan in July 2014, this time to Kuban Krasnodar, returning to CSKA during the winter break after Kuban declined to extend his loan. Oliseh officially left CSKA upon on the expiration of his contract in June 2015.

Oliseh joined Astra Giurgiu in March 2016.

He signed a contract with China League One side Dalian Yifang on 24 June 2016. He left the Dalian Yifang in December 2016.

=== LISCR FC ===
On 17 October 2020, Oliseh returned to football, signing a one-year contract with Liberian First Division side LISCR.

== International career ==
Oliseh, who had represented his adopted nation of Nigeria since childhood, received a call-up to the Liberian team from manager Bertalan Bicskei in September 2010 for a 2012 Africa Cup of Nations qualification match against Zimbabwe. Oliseh would honor the invitation, citing star Liberian forward George Weah as a key motivating factor behind his decision. "I have my entire family and friends here in Liberia who would love to see me play for our nation, I love Nigeria but I can't play for them," said Oliseh.

Oliseh then made his debut on 5 September 2010 against Zimbabwe and scored the equalizing goal in a 1–1 draw for Liberia.
