= Obafemi Martins =

Nigerian footballer (born 1984)

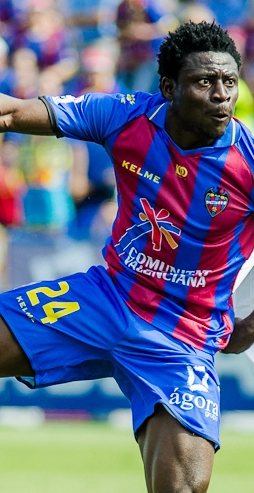
- Martins with Levante in 2012

Personal information
- Full name: Obafemi Akinwunmi Martins
- Date of birth: 28 October 1984 (age 42)
- Place of birth: Lagos, Nigeria
- Height: 1.70 m (5 ft 7 in)
- Position: Forward

Youth career
- 1999–2000: Ebedei

Senior career*
Years	Team	Apps	(Gls)
2000–2001	Reggiana	2	(0)
2001–2006	Inter Milan	88	(28)
2006–2009	Newcastle United	88	(28)
2009–2010	VfL Wolfsburg	16	(6)
2010–2012	Rubin Kazan	20	(3)
2011	→ Birmingham City (loan)	4	(0)
2012–2013	Levante	21	(7)
2013–2015	Seattle Sounders FC	72	(40)
2016–2018	Shanghai Shenhua	40	(19)
2020	Shanghai Shenhua	4	(0)
2020	Wuhan	6	(1)
Total		361	(132)

International career
2004–2015	Nigeria	42	(18)
- * Club domestic league appearances and goals

Obafemi Akinwunmi Martins (/ˌoʊbəˈfɛmi/ oh-buh-FEH-mee /ˌɑːkɪnˈwʊnmi/ ah-kin-WOON-mee /ˈmɑːrtɪns/ MAR-tinz; born 28 October 1984) is a Nigerian former professional footballer who played as a forward.

After leaving Nigeria for Italy at age 16, he played for a number of top-division clubs around Europe. He began his senior career in 2002 at Serie A club Inter Milan, before he moved to Premier League club Newcastle United in 2006, and then to Bundesliga club VfL Wolfsburg in 2009. Having joined Russian Premier League side Rubin Kazan in 2010, they loaned him to Birmingham City in 2011. He spent a season with La Liga club Levante, he played for Seattle Sounders FC of Major League Soccer from 2013 to 2015, before spending several years in the Chinese Super League with Shanghai Shenhua and Wuhan.

In club football, Martins won the Serie A title, the Italian Cup (twice), and the Italian Super Cup, all with Inter. With Birmingham he scored the winning goal in the 2011 Football League Cup final. Martins played in the UEFA Champions League with Inter, Wolfsburg and Rubin. His highest scoring league seasons saw him score 11 goals in the 2004–05 Serie A, and 17 in both the 2006–07 Premier League and 2014 MLS. In international football, Martins was in the Nigerian squad for the Africa Cup of Nations in 2006, 2008 and 2010, and for the FIFA World Cup in 2010.

== Club career ==
=== Early career ===
Martins joined the local football club F.C. Ebedei, having been scouted by manager Churchill Oliseh while playing on the streets of his hometown. After a year with the club, Serie C side A.C. Reggiana made a move for the player. After a three-month trial, Martins and Ebedei teammate Stephen Makinwa signed youth contracts with the club in 2000. His first season in Italy saw Martins break into the first team squad, and later in the year Serie A sides Perugia and Inter Milan made offers for the forward.

=== Inter Milan ===
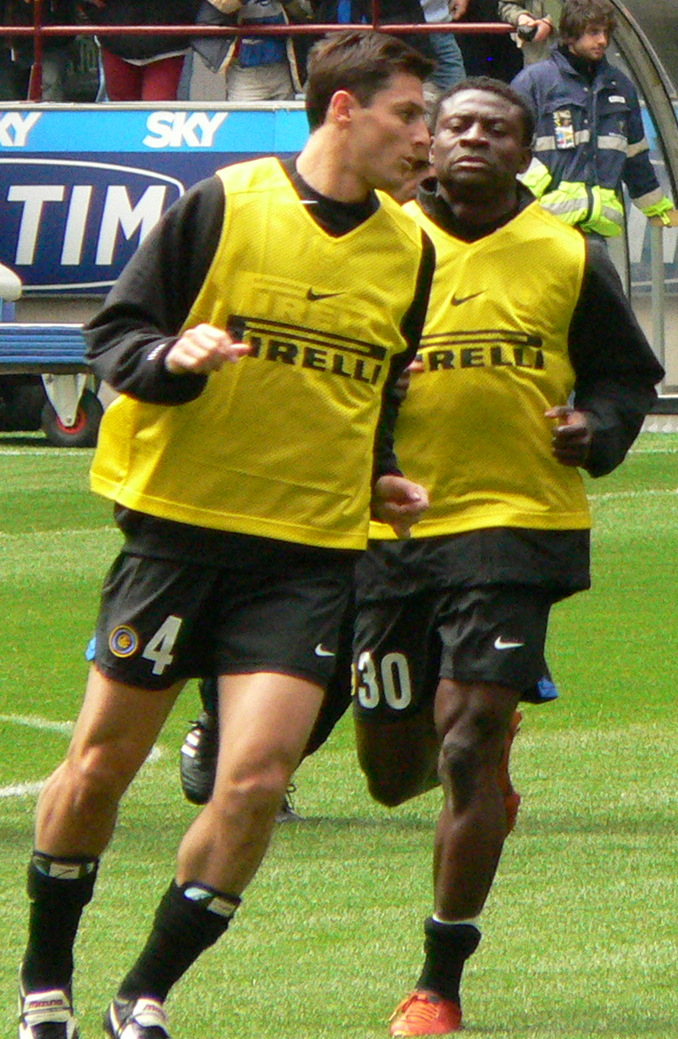
Martins (right) with Inter Milan in 2005

Martins was signed by Inter Milan in 2001 for a €750,000 transfer fee, and in his first season he scored 23 goals for the youth team, helping them to win the Campionato Nazionale Primavera in 2001–02 season. His form for the youth side led to his first-team league debut the following season, starting in a match against Parma on 22 December 2002 which was won by Inter 2–1. The following month, he signed a new contract for the club along with Nicola Beati and Giovanni Pasquale.

Martins did not become a regular member of the first team squad until the 2002–03 season. During this season he was given his first UEFA Champions League appearance by manager Héctor Cúper, entering as a substitute against his future employers, Newcastle United, at St James' Park. He scored his first Champions League goal in a match against Bayer 04 Leverkusen to secure Inter's place in the quarter-finals; footage of his celebratory somersaults were subsequently used by UEFA to advertise the following season's competition. He scored again in the semi-final match against Inter's arch-rivals Milan, but could not prevent the club losing out on away goals to the competition's eventual winners. In the championship, he scored once in four appearances.

Martins signed a long-term contract with Inter Milan in 2005 which ran until 2010 and was worth around €2.5 million annually. He was also protagonist in team's successful run in Coppa Italia, scoring six goals, including a hat-trick against Bologna, as the tournament ended in conquest. Martins amassed 22 goals in 45 matches across all competitions, setting a new personal best; his good form for Inter earned him a spot in Nigeria's 2006 Africa Cup of Nations squad.

Although he had some success with Inter, scoring 28 goals for the club in 88 league games as well as 11 goals in European competitions, he was sold in August 2006. This was due to Inter bringing in two new strikers; first Argentinian Hernán Crespo was brought in on loan from Chelsea and then the Swede Zlatan Ibrahimović was bought by Inter from Juventus.

=== Newcastle United ===
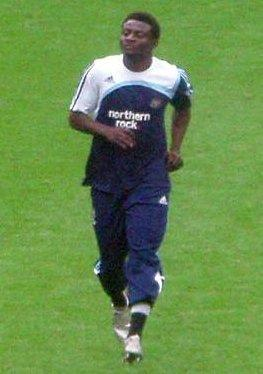
Martins warming up before a match

After Martins submitted a transfer request, Premier League club Newcastle United completed a deal with Inter for the striker on 24 August 2006 for €15 million. Martins signed a five-year deal. He was paraded in front of the Geordie fans before their UEFA cup tie against FK Ventspils, and inherited the club's cherished number 9 shirt, vacated after the retirement of the club-record goalscorer Alan Shearer in April.

Martins made his Premier League debut on 27 August, in the 2–0 defeat to Aston Villa, in which he was stretchered off with a knee injury. It turned out that Martins suffered a severe dead leg and internal bleeding. His unremarkable first few appearances for Newcastle caused manager Glenn Roeder to speak out in his defence.

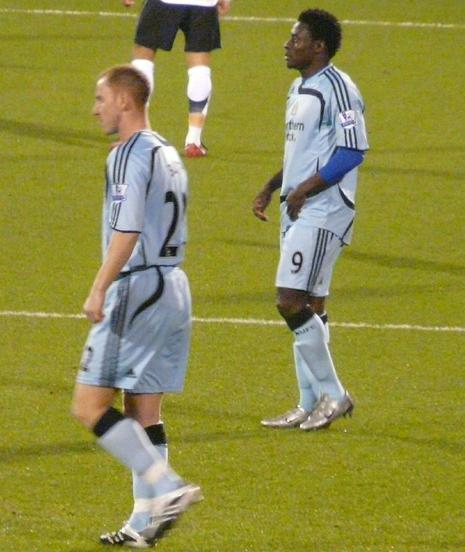
Martins with Newcastle teammate Nicky Butt in 2007

However, on 17 September, Martins scored his first goal for Newcastle. It was the second goal in a 2–0 victory over West Ham United at Upton Park, and from there his goalscoring form began to improve steadily.

Reports in January 2007 suggested that Chelsea were considering making an offer for Martins' services after his impressive form. These reports were later rubbished by Martins himself, and Roeder stated that although he was interested in signing a Chelsea player, he would not allow Martins to leave Newcastle.

On 14 January, in a 3–2 away win against Tottenham Hotspur, Martins' 20-yard shot rocketed into the net. This strike was clocked by Sky Sports at a speed of 84 mph (135 km/h), making it unofficially the ninth hardest shot ever recorded in football according to the Guardian website. This was his tenth goal for Newcastle. Martins ended his first season on Tyneside with 17 goals in 46 games.

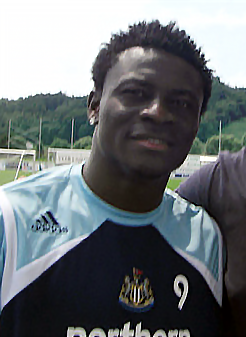
Martins at a pre-season training camp with Newcastle in 2007

His second season was somewhat mixed. With new manager Sam Allardyce preferring to play Michael Owen and Mark Viduka up front, Martins found himself being used as an impact substitute for the first half of the season. Despite this he managed to score consistently, and when Allardyce was sacked and Kevin Keegan was appointed, Martins found himself being used as part of a three pronged attack along with Owen and Viduka. Martins scored fewer goals in his second season with Newcastle, mainly due to him no longer being the focal point of all their attacks as he was in his first season with them, as well as his season being interrupted with the African Cup of Nations participation with Nigeria in December.

Martins scored six goals in 12 league games during the first half of the 2008–09 season before a torn hamstring ruled him out for several games. He did make it back in time for the last two games of the season, scoring in a relegation six-pointer derby against Middlesbrough. However, he could not stop Newcastle being relegated to the Championship. He initially reiterated his desire to stay and help the club return to the Premier League for the 2009–10 season, but he eventually left for VfL Wolfsburg. His last game was in a preseason friendly against Leyton Orient, which Newcastle lost 6–1.

During his three-year spell on Tyneside, Martins amassed 35 goals in all competitions from 104 games.

=== VfL Wolfsburg ===
On 29 July 2009, Newcastle accepted a £9 million bid from Bundesliga champions VfL Wolfsburg. The transfer was confirmed on 31 July with Martins signing a four-year contract. For his debut, Martins came on as a second-half substitute against 1. FC Köln at the Rhein Energie Stadion, with his team deadlocked at 1–1. He helped in the buildup to the second goal and capped off his first appearance in the Bundesliga with a well-taken goal after dribbling past two onrushing defenders and then coolly finishing from six yards out, slotting the ball past the goalkeeper to the far post.

=== Rubin Kazan ===
On 9 July 2010, Martins was sold for a reported €17 million to reigning Russian Premier League champions Rubin Kazan. He signed a three-year contract and told BBC Sport: "I am joining a team of champions and I hope to bring my best to the club to make them even greater." Martins' agent, Nicola Walter, revealed that Rubin met all of the player's requirements and that manager Kurban Berdyev had a "massive role" for him to play, following the departure of striker Aleksandr Bukharov. Martins was able to make his debut with Rubin after 1 August, when the transfer window was opened. On 9 May 2012, Rubin Kazan won the Russian Cup giving Martins his first trophy in Russia.

==== Loan to Birmingham City ====
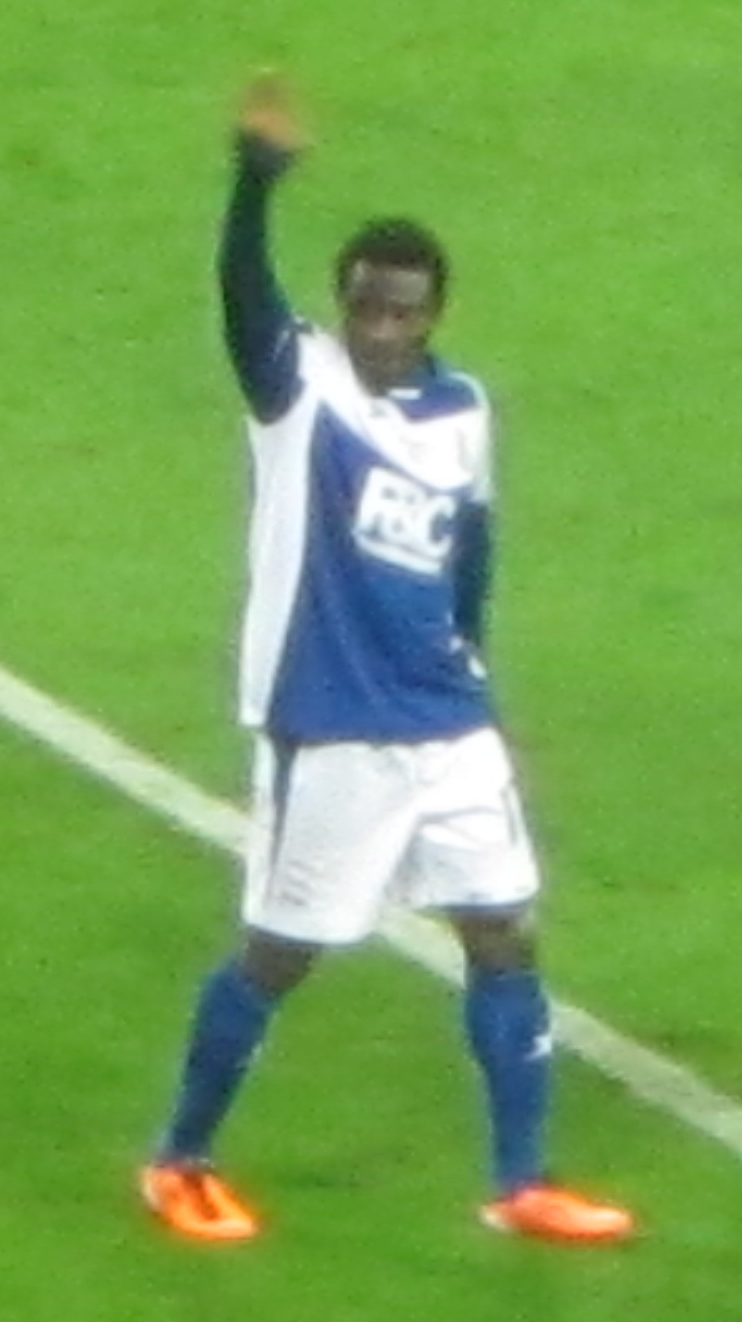
Martins celebrating after the 2011 Football League Cup Final

Following the birth of his child, Martins requested a move to England to be nearer to his family. On 31 January 2011, he joined Premier League club Birmingham City on loan until the end of the season, with the option of a £5 million permanent deal in the summer of 2011. He made his debut, which had been delayed by the formalities of obtaining a working visa, in the starting eleven against Stoke City on 12 February; he played for 75 minutes as Birmingham won 1–0. He scored his first goal for the club, 17 minutes into the FA Cup fifth-round defeat of Sheffield Wednesday, after a strong run.

Martins scored the winning goal in the 2011 Football League Cup Final as Birmingham beat Arsenal 2–1 at Wembley Stadium, having been brought on as an 83rd-minute substitute. With one minute remaining in normal time, there was a moment of confusion between Arsenal goalkeeper Wojciech Szczęsny and defender Laurent Koscielny as they attempted to deal with a headed knock down from Birmingham's Nikola Žigić. Martins passed the resulting loose ball into the empty net from near the penalty spot. Martins described it as "the easiest goal I've ever scored in my career". After two more Premier League appearances, he spent several weeks out with an injury eventually diagnosed as a stress fracture of the left tibia. After surgery in late April, he faced a recovery period estimated at three to four months.

=== Levante ===
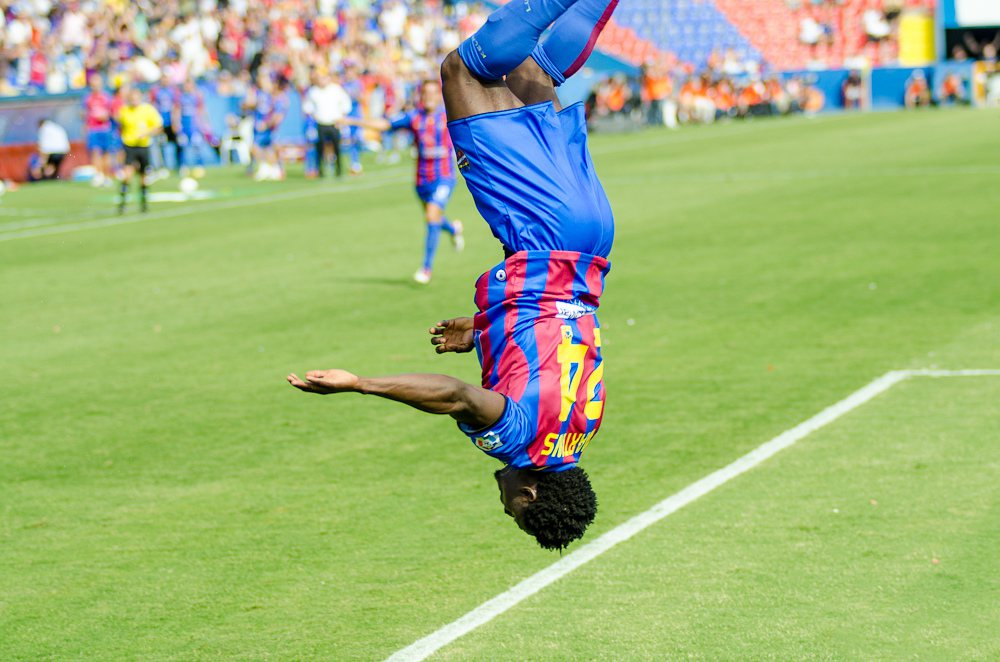
Martins (pictured with Levante in 2012) is known for celebrating a goal with a backflip

On 13 September 2012, Martins moved to Levante on a free transfer, signing a two-year contract. He made his league debut on 23 September 2012, where he scored his first goal, and the winning goal, in a 2–1 home win against Real Sociedad. Martins scored a brace for Levante in their 3–1 home victory over Granada on 28 October, sending his side into fourth place in the La Liga standings.

=== Seattle Sounders FC ===
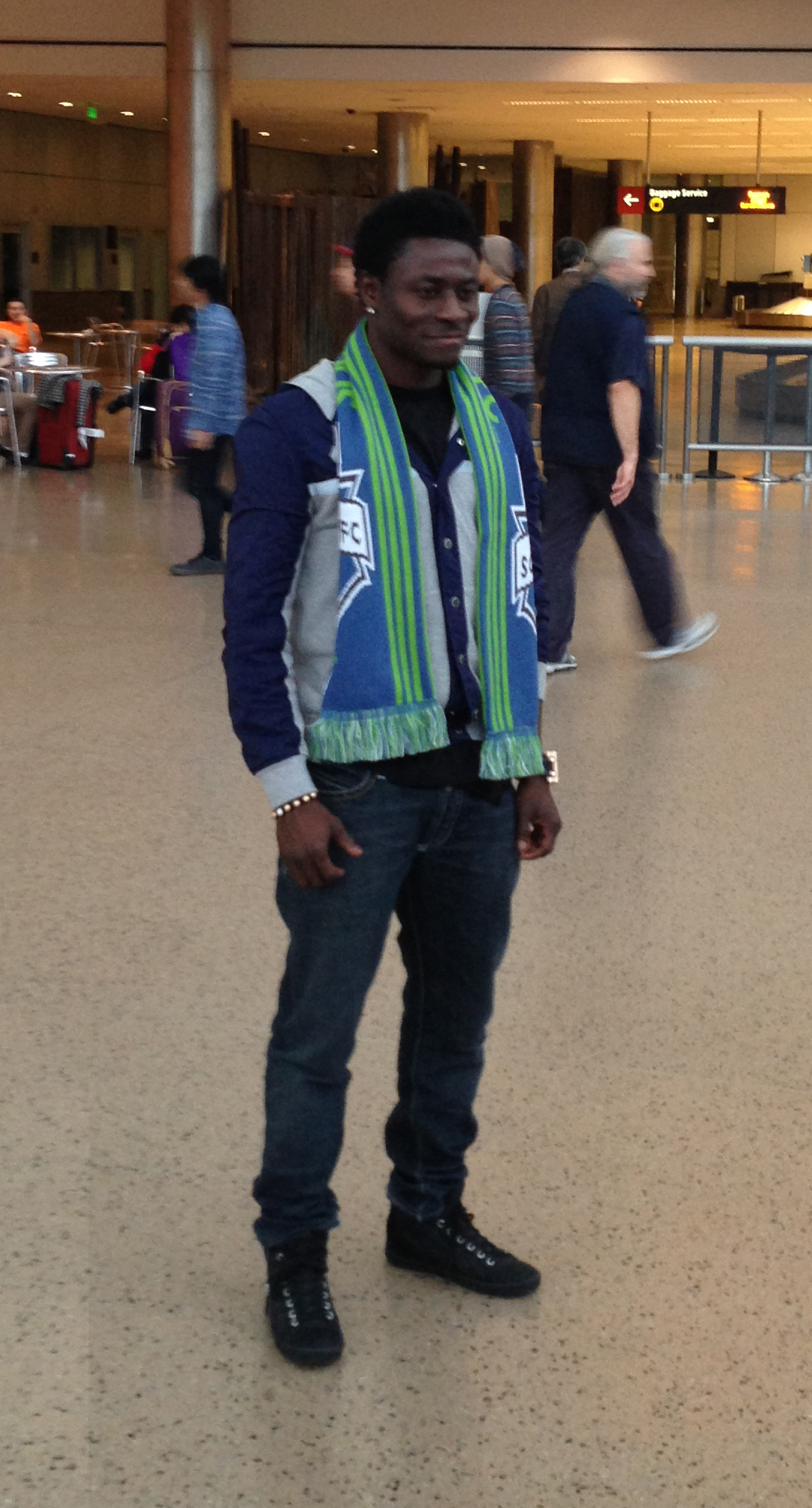
Martins at Seattle Tacoma International Airport upon arrival to Seattle Sounders FC in 2013

On 11 March 2013, it was announced that Martins signed with MLS club Seattle Sounders FC as a Designated Player after the club paid a $4 million buyout clause in Martins' contract with Levante. The move concluded weeks of speculation of a possible Martins move to Seattle. Levante had been hesitant to lose Martins mid-season, and had threatened Sounders FC with a tampering lawsuit. On 15 March 2013, the club announced that the signing was official. Martins scored his first goal for the club on 20 April 2013, performing his signature back-flip goal celebration.

On 24 October 2014, Martins signed a new three-year contract extension with Seattle, nearly doubling his annual salary to more than $3 million. The following day, Martins provided an assist for Marco Pappa's first goal as Seattle defeated the Galaxy 2–0 to win the Supporters' Shield. The assist meant that Martins finished with 17 goals during the regular season, a club record, as well as notching 13 assists, a joint-club record held with Mauro Rosales.

Martins had a very successful 2014 season with the Sounders, his second with the club, and was named as one of three MLS MVP finalists. Martins was named to the MLS Best XI and the Sounders won every game in which he scored. He also won MLS Goal of the Year for a looping goal he shot from an extremely tight angle near the end line into the far netting over Earthquakes keeper Jon Busch.

=== Shanghai Shenhua ===
On 18 February 2016, Martins was signed for Chinese Super League side Shanghai Shenhua. On 15 May 2016, he scored his first goal with Shanghai as a late substitute in a 5–1 win over Guangzhou R&F. Martins scored the only goal in the first leg of the 2017 Chinese FA Cup final and scored a spectacular goal in the second. Although their opponents, Shanghai SIPG, won the second leg 3–2, Shanghai Shenhua won the trophy on away goals.

On 31 March 2018, Martins scored his first hat-trick for Shenhua in a 4–2 home win against Hebei China Fortune. However, he suffered a partial rupture of tendon of quadriceps femoris at his right knee in the fifth group stage match of 2018 AFC Champions League against Kashima Antlers on 3 April 2018, which ruled him out for at least six months. On 1 June 2018 it was announced that Martins had been waived from Shenhua.

He suffered a torn hamstring in May 2019, and in November 2019 said that he was seeking a new club following his recovery from injury.

=== Return to Shanghai Shenhua ===
On 15 July 2020, it was announced that Martins had returned to Chinese Super League side Shanghai Shenhua.

=== Wuhan Zall ===
On 20 September 2020, after his Shanghai Shenhua contract was terminated, Martins joined Chinese Super League club Wuhan Zall on a short-term deal until the end of the season.

== International career ==
Martins made his debut for Nigeria in 2004 at the age of 19 in the 2004 Unity Cup scoring the second goal, in the tri-nations Unity Cup tournament in London. He was a part of the Nigerian team that finished third in the 2006 African Cup of Nations. Martins scored two goals in the competition, both coming against Senegal in the first round.

His future for the national team was placed in doubt on numerous occasions after separate incidents of controversy. In August 2006, the Nigerian FA (NFA) website had his date of birth down as 1 May 1978, which would have made him 28 years of age rather than 21. The NFA soon confirmed that it had been an administrative error and apologised for the confusion it had caused. However Martins threatened to quit playing for the national team after the blunder had initially put his move to Newcastle in doubt.

On 6 February 2007, Martins failed to turn up for the 4–1 friendly defeat against Ghana, despite being ordered to play. He later explained his absence was due to the fact he had travelled to Lagos to visit his sick mother. The Nigerian caretaker coach Augustine Eguavoen was furious with Martins and threatened to ban him from the national team. On 14 February 2007, Martins apologised for missing the game but said he believed his mother's health was more important. He also said that he would be available to play for Nigeria in the future. He made his return to the national side on 24 March 2007, playing the full match against Uganda in an Africa Cup of Nations qualifying match and won.

Following the end of Nigeria's 2008 Africa Cup of Nations qualification campaign, Nigeria faced Mexico in Ciudad Juárez for a friendly match. Martins scored two goals in a 2–2 draw.

On 17 November 2007, Martins captained Nigeria for the first time, in a friendly match against Australia for his 19th appearance. On 12 November 2009 he scored a spectacular goal in the 83rd minute against Kenya in Nairobi, thus ensuring Nigeria's qualification for the 2010 FIFA World Cup. At the finals in South Africa, Martins played in just two games for a total of 71 minutes, without scoring. In the first group game, he came on as a 52nd-minute substitute for Victor Obinna. In the third game he was used as a 57th-minute substitute for Nwankwo Kanu. Nigeria exited the tournament bottom of Group B with only one point.

== Style of play ==
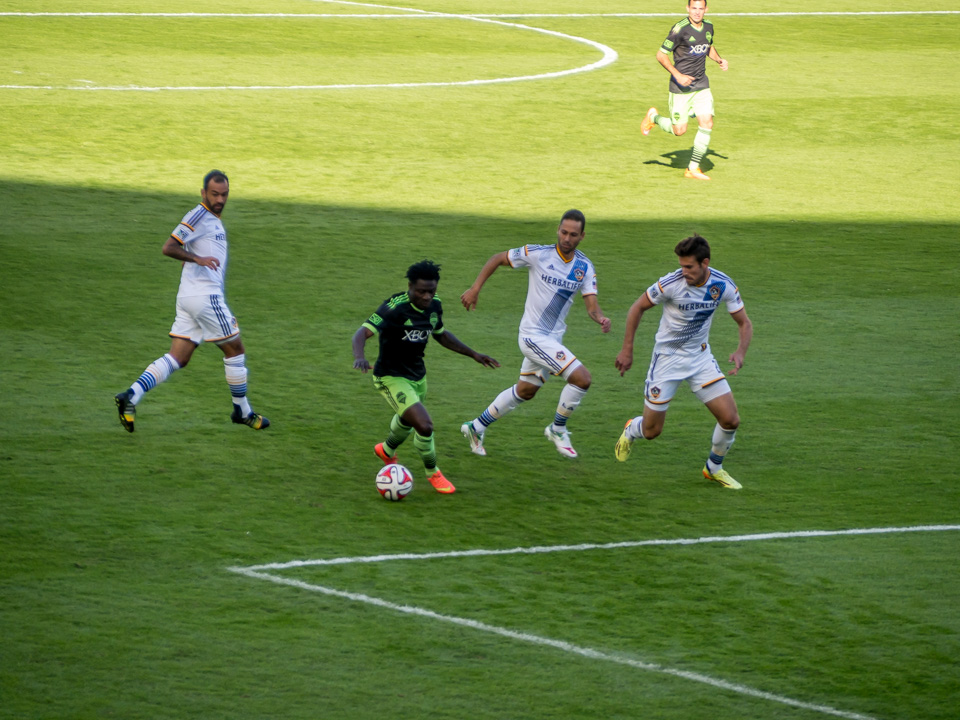
Martins in action for Seattle in 2014

Martins is a fast left-footed striker, who is quick on the ball. He is primarily known for his pace, agility, and athleticism as a footballer. He is also known for his striking power, strength, and elevation despite his small stature. Martins is quite distinct with his acrobatic goal celebrations, which often included back flips.

== Personal life ==
Martins had two brothers who also played football professionally. His elder brother, Oladipupo Martins, was also a professional footballer before retiring in 2009 due to heart problems. He died on 8 August 2011 of a suspected heart attack in Lagos, Nigeria. Martins' younger brother is John Ronan Martins. The name "Obafemi" translates literally to "the king loves me" in the Yoruba language.

Martins received his U.S. green card in 2015, which qualified him as a domestic player for MLS roster purposes.

He has a son, Kevin Martins (born 2005), with Togolese singer and actress Zelie Adjo. He later had a child with Ghanaian Abigail Barwuah, the sister of Mario Balotelli, in 2013.

== Career statistics ==
=== Club ===
Appearances and goals by club, season and competition
Club	Season	League			National cup (Note: Includes Coppa Italia, FA Cup, DFB-Pokal, Russian Cup, Copa del Rey, U.S. Open Cup, Chinese FA Cup)		League cup (Note: Includes Football League Cup)		Continental		Other		Total	
Club	Season	Division	Apps	Goals	Apps	Goals	Apps	Goals	Apps	Goals	Apps	Goals	Apps	Goals
Reggiana	2000–01	Serie C1	2	0	—		—		—		—		2	0
Inter Milan	2001–02	Serie A	0	0	0	0	—		0	0	—		0	0
Inter Milan	2002–03	Serie A	4	1	2	0	—		4 (Note: Appearances in UEFA Champions League)	2	—		10	3
Inter Milan	2003–04	Serie A	25	7	3	1	—		9 (Note: Five appearances and one goal in UEFA Champions League, four appearances and two goals in UEFA Cup)	3	—		37	11
Inter Milan	2004–05	Serie A	31	11	6	6	—		9	5	—		46	22
Inter Milan	2005–06	Serie A	28	9	5	2	—		9	2	1 (Note: Appearance in Supercoppa Italiana)	0	43	13
Inter Milan	Total		88	28	16	9	—		31	12	1	0	136	49
Newcastle United	2006–07	Premier League	33	11	2	0	2	0	9 (Note: Appearances in UEFA Cup)	6	—		46	17
Newcastle United	2007–08	Premier League	31	9	0	0	2	1	—		—		33	10
Newcastle United	2008–09	Premier League	24	8	0	0	1	0	—		—		25	8
Newcastle United	Total		88	28	2	0	5	1	9	6	—		104	35
VfL Wolfsburg	2009–10	Bundesliga	16	6	1	0	—		8 (Note: Four appearances and one goal in UEFA Champions League, four appearances in UEFA Europa League)	1	—		25	7
Rubin Kazan	2010	Russian Premier League	12	2	—		—		5	0	—		17	2
Rubin Kazan	2011–12	Russian Premier League	8	1	1	0	—		8 (Note: One appearance in UEFA Champions League, seven appearances and two goals in UEFA Europa League)	2	—		17	3
Rubin Kazan	2012–13	Russian Premier League	0	0	—		—		—		1 (Note: Appearance in Russian Super Cup)	0	1	0
Rubin Kazan	Total		20	3	1	0	—		13	2	1	0	35	5
Birmingham City (loan)	2010–11	Premier League	4	0	1	1	1	1	—		—		6	2
Levante	2012–13	La Liga	21	7	3	0	—		3 (Note: Appearances in UEFA Europa League)	2	—		27	9
Seattle Sounders FC	2013	Major League Soccer	20	8	1	0	—		—		1 (Note: Appearance(s) in MLS Cup playoffs)	0	22	8
Seattle Sounders FC	2014	Major League Soccer	31	17	2	2	—		—		4	0	37	19
Seattle Sounders FC	2015	Major League Soccer	21	15	1	1	—		0	0	3	0	25	16
Seattle Sounders FC	Total		72	40	4	3	—		0	0	8	0	84	43
Shanghai Shenhua	2016	Chinese Super League	26	9	5	6	—		—		—		31	15
Shanghai Shenhua	2017	Chinese Super League	13	7	7	6	—		1 (Note: Appearance(s) in AFC Champions League)	0	—		21	13
Shanghai Shenhua	2018	Chinese Super League	1	3	0	0	—		5	1	1 (Note: Appearance in Chinese FA Super Cup)	0	7	4
Shanghai Shenhua	Total		40	19	12	12	—		6	1	1	0	59	32
Shanghai Shenhua	2020	Chinese Super League	4	0	0	0	—		0	0	—		4	0
Wuhan	2020	Chinese Super League	6	1	0	0	—		—		—		6	1
Career total			361	132	40	25	6	2	70	24	11	0	488	183

=== International ===
Appearances and goals by national team and year
National team	Year	Apps	Goals
Nigeria	2004	4	3
Nigeria	2005	5	6
Nigeria	2006	7	2
Nigeria	2007	5	2
Nigeria	2008	2	0
Nigeria	2009	3	2
Nigeria	2010	12	3
Nigeria	2011	0	0
Nigeria	2012	1	0
Nigeria	2013	1	0
Nigeria	2014	0	0
Nigeria	2015	2	0
Total		42	18

Scores and results list Nigeria's goal tally first, score column indicates score after each Martins goal.

List of international goals scored by Obafemi Martins
No.	Date	Venue	Opponent	Score	Result	Competition	Refs
1	29 May 2004	The Valley, London, England	Republic of Ireland	2–0	3–0	2004 Unity Cup	
2	5 June 2004	National Stadium, Abuja, Nigeria	Rwanda	1–0	2–0	2006 FIFA World Cup qualification	
3	5 June 2004	National Stadium, Abuja, Nigeria	Rwanda	2–0	2–0	2006 FIFA World Cup qualification	
4	5 June 2005	Amahoro Stadium, Kigali, Rwanda	Rwanda	1–1	1–1	2006 FIFA World Cup qualification	
5	17 August 2005	Tripoli Stadium, Tripoli, Libya	Libya	1–0	1–0	Friendly	
6	4 September 2005	Ahmed Zabana Stadium, Oran, Algeria	Algeria	1–0	5–2	2006 FIFA World Cup qualification	
7	4 September 2005	Ahmed Zabana Stadium, Oran, Algeria	Algeria	4–2	5–2	2006 FIFA World Cup qualification	
8	8 October 2005	National Stadium, Abuja, Nigeria	Zimbabwe	1–0	5–1	2006 FIFA World Cup qualification	
9	8 October 2005	National Stadium, Abuja, Nigeria	Zimbabwe	3–1	5–1	2006 FIFA World Cup qualification	
10	31 January 2006	Port Said Stadium, Port Said, Egypt	Senegal	1–1	2–1	2006 Africa Cup of Nations	
11	31 January 2006	Port Said Stadium, Port Said, Egypt	Senegal	2–1	2–1	2006 Africa Cup of Nations	
12	14 October 2007	Estadio Olímpico Benito Juárez, Ciudad Juárez, Mexico	Mexico	1–0	2–2	Friendly	
13	14 October 2007	Estadio Olímpico Benito Juárez, Ciudad Juárez, Mexico	Mexico	2–0	2–2	Friendly	
14	14 November 2009	Moi International Sports Centre, Nairobi, Kenya	Kenya	1–1	3–2	2010 FIFA World Cup qualification	
15	14 November 2009	Moi International Sports Centre, Nairobi, Kenya	Kenya	3–2	3–2	2010 FIFA World Cup qualification	
16	20 January 2010	Estádio Nacional da Tundavala, Lubango, Angola	Mozambique	3–0	3–0	2010 Africa Cup of Nations	
17	6 June 2010	Makhulong Stadium, Tembisa, South Africa	North Korea	3–1	3–1	Friendly	
18	5 September 2010	U.J. Esuene Stadium, Calabar, Nigeria	Madagascar	1–0	2–0	2012 Africa Cup of Nations qualification	

== Honours ==
Inter Milan

- Serie A: 2005–06
- Coppa Italia: 2004–05, 2005–06
- Supercoppa Italiana: 2005

Birmingham City

- Football League Cup: 2010–11

Rubin Kazan

- Russian Cup: 2011–12
- Russian Super Cup: 2012

Seattle Sounders FC

- MLS Supporters' Shield: 2014
- U.S. Open Cup: 2014

Shanghai Shenhua

- Chinese FA Cup: 2017

Nigeria

- Africa Cup of Nations third place: 2006

Individual

- CAF Most Promising Talent of the Year: 2003, 2004
- MLS Best XI: 2014
- MLS Goal of the Year: 2014
- MLS All-Star: 2015
- Chinese FA Cup top goalscorer: 2017
