= Egutu Oliseh =

Nigerian footballer (born 1980)

Personal information
- Full name: Egutu Chukwuma Oliseh
- Date of birth: 18 November 1980 (age 45)
- Place of birth: Lagos, Nigeria
- Height: 1.83 m (6 ft 0 in)
- Position: Midfielder

Senior career*
Years	Team	Apps	(Gls)
1998–2003	Nancy	46	(0)
1999–2000	→ Louhans-Cuiseaux (loan)	8	(0)
2001–2002	→ Beauvais (loan)	34	(0)
2003–2005	Grenoble	51	(2)
2005–2006	La Louviere	31	(1)
2006–2007	Queens Park Rangers	2	(0)
2007–2008	Montpellier	43	(2)
2008–2012	Panthrakikos	36	(0)
2010–2012	→ Ergotelis (loan)	47	(1)
2012–2013	Panachaiki	13	(1)
2013–2014	Olympiacos Volos	37	(1)
2014	Paniliakos	7	(0)
2014–2015	Apollon Kalamarias	10	(0)
2015–2017	Panserraikos	14	
- * Club domestic league appearances and goals

Egutu Chukwuma Oliseh (born 18 November 1980) is a Nigerian former footballer who played as a midfielder.

== Career ==
Oliseh started his career at Nancy. He was loaned out twice during his 5-year spell with the club. He subsequently transferred to Grenoble and La Louviere, before joining the Queens Park Rangers in 2006. His stay at QPR was unremarkable though, as he was deemed to be surplus to requirements by manager John Gregory. In January 2007, after only a six-month stay at the club, it was announced he had joined Montpellier. After one season, he moved to newly promoted Greek side Panthrakikos, in the Greek Super League. After the club's relegation to the Football League in 2010, Oliseh was loaned out to Super League side Ergotelis for two years. After his loaning spell ended, he went on to play for Panachaiki, Olympiacos Volos and Paniliakos, all in the Football League. On 30 July 2014 he joined Apollon Kalamarias and later on played for Apollon Smyrnis and Panserraikos in the same tier of Greek football. On 3 January 2017, it was announced that Oliseh moved to amateur side Olympiacos Lavrio in Eastern Attica, making this transfer the biggest in the club's history.

== Personal life ==
He is the younger brother of Churchill Oliseh, Sunday Oliseh and Azubike Oliseh. His nephew is Liberian footballer Sekou Oliseh. He holds both Nigerian and French nationalities.
