= Sunday Oliseh =

Nigerian footballer and manager (born 1974)

Personal information
- Full name: Sunday Ogochukwu Oliseh
- Date of birth: 14 September 1974 (age 52)
- Place of birth: Abavo, Delta State, Nigeria
- Height: 1.83 m (6 ft 0 in)
- Positions: Defensive midfielder; midfielder; centre back

Youth career
- 1989–1990: Julius Berger
- 1990–1991: RFC Lüttich

Senior career*
Years	Team	Apps	(Gls)
1990	Julius Berger		
1991–1994	RFC Liège	75	(3)
1994–1995	Reggiana	29	(1)
1995–1997	1. FC Köln	54	(4)
1997–1999	Ajax	54	(8)
1999–2000	Juventus	8	(0)
2000–2005	Borussia Dortmund	53	(1)
2003–2004	→ VfL Bochum (loan)	32	(1)
2005–2006	Genk	16	(0)
Total		321	(18)

International career
1993–2002	Nigeria (Note: Oliseh played 54 games and scored 2 goals for Nigeria per RSSSF.)	55	(4)

Managerial career
- 2007: Eupen (sports director)
- 2008–2009: Verviétois
- 2015–2016: Nigeria
- 2017–2018: Fortuna Sittard
- 2022: SV 19 Straelen
Medal record
Representing Nigeria
Men's Football
Gold medal – first place	1996 Atlanta	Team competition
- * Club domestic league appearances and goals

Sunday Ogochukwu Oliseh (born 14 September 1974) is a Nigerian football manager and former footballer who played as a defensive midfielder. Physical yet technically gifted, he played for top European clubs including Ajax, Borussia Dortmund and Juventus.

== Playing career ==
Oliseh played 55 international matches and scored 4 goals for Nigeria, and played at the 1994 and 1998 FIFA World Cups. Oliseh was also part of Nigeria's Olympic gold medal winning team of 1996.

Oliseh was voted Africa's third best footballer in 1998 by CAF.

He started playing football at Ojota, Lagos Nigeria before his parent moved to Festac, where he later continued his journey into professional football.

He is mostly remembered for scoring the winning goal in the group stage match against Spain in the 1998 World Cup, as Nigeria prevailed 3–2. A throw-in deep in the Spanish half was headed clear by Fernando Hierro – Oliseh ran and fired an explosive shot from 25 yards and took Spanish goalkeeper Andoni Zubizarreta completely by surprise. Despite captaining Nigeria during the 2002 African Cup of Nations, Oliseh was omitted from his country's World Cup squad later that year for disciplinary reasons. After missing out on World Cup selection, Oliseh retired from international football in June 2002, demanding unpaid allowances and dues owed to be paid.

In March 2004, Oliseh was sacked by Borussia Dortmund after headbutting teammate Vahid Hashemian while on loan at VfL Bochum allegedly over racial remarks.

In January 2006, at the age of 31, Oliseh retired from professional football after playing a half season for Belgian First Division A top club K.R.C. Genk.

== Managerial career ==
Oliseh started his coaching career in Belgium with youth teams in the Belgian 3rd Division Verviers, notably the Under 19 team. He graduated to the first team as chief coach of Verviers in the 2008–09 season. During the 2014–15 season, he was appointed as the Chief Coach and Club Manager of RCS VISE in the Belgium 3rd Division.

In 2015–16, he was appointed by the Nigerian Football Federation (NFF) as the head coach of the Nigerian national men's football team, where he maintained an impressive record of losing only two out of fourteen games managed.

He qualified Nigeria to the CHAN tournament in Rwanda, qualified Nigeria to the Group phase of the 2018 world cup Qualifiers and on his first game as Chief Coach of Nigeria in an AFCON qualifier managed a draw in Tanzania. He resigned as Nigeria's national coach on the 26th of February 2016 exactly a month to the team's encounter with Egypt in the AFCON qualifiers. He was barely 8 months into his stay as manager and resigned due to what he believed were contract violations, lack of support, unpaid wages and benefits to his players, asst. Coaches and himself. On 27 December 2016, it was announced that Oliseh had been appointed as the new manager of Fortuna Sittard. He was fired on 14 February 2018, and claimed the reason he was fired was because he refused to participate in illegal activities at the club. In January 2024, former Nigerian captain and Chelsea player John Mikel Obi, described Oliseh as 'easily the worst coach he ever played under because he had no clue what he was doing and ruined the unity of players within the national team', which Obi Mikel claimed led to Vincent Enyeama leaving the national team.

After two years without a club, in March 2020, Oliseh stated that he had turned down "two jobs from Belgian clubs", but that he waited for the right offer.

In June 2022, he was appointed as the new head coach of German club SV 19 Straelen. In August 2022, after just two months in charge, he quit his position after the team suffered five losses in five games.

== Style of play ==
Oliseh was a physical yet technically gifted midfielder. Although he essentially played as a defensive midfielder throughout his career, Jonathan Wilson noted in a 2013 article for The Guardian that he was an early example of a more creative interpreter of this role, who focussed more on ball retention and passing rather than solely looking to win back possession.

== Personal life ==
His younger brothers, Azubuike and Egutu, were also professional footballers; another brother is Churchill Oliseh and his nephew is Sekou Oliseh.

== Career statistics ==
=== Club ===
Appearances and goals by club, season and competition
Club	Season	League			Cup		Continental		Other		Total	
Club	Season	Division	Apps	Goals	Apps	Goals	Apps	Goals	Apps	Goals	Apps	Goals
Liège	1990–91	Belgian First Division	3	0			0	0			3	0
Liège	1991–92	Belgian First Division	16	1			—				16	1
Liège	1992–93	Belgian First Division	30	2			—				30	2
Liège	1993–94	Belgian First Division	26	0			—				26	0
Liège	Total		75	3			—				75	3
Reggiana	1994–95	Serie A	29	1	4	0	—		—		33	1
1. FC Köln	1995–96	Bundesliga	24	0	0	0	—		—		24	0
1. FC Köln	1996–97	Bundesliga	30	4	1	0	—		—		31	4
1. FC Köln	Total		54	4	1	0	—		—		55	4
Ajax	1997–98	Eredivisie	29	5	5	0	8	1	—		42	6
Ajax	1998–99	Eredivisie	25	3	3	0	5	0	1	0	34	3
Ajax	Total		54	8	8	0	13	1	1	0	76	9
Juventus	1999–2000	Serie A	8	0	1	0	10	1	0	0	19	1
Borussia Dortmund	2000–01	Bundesliga	22	0	2	0	—		—		24	0
Borussia Dortmund	2001–02	Bundesliga	18	1	0	0	13	1	0	0	31	2
Borussia Dortmund	2002–03	Bundesliga	2	0	0	0	0	0	0	0	2	0
Borussia Dortmund	2004–05	Bundesliga	11	0	2	1	2	0	—		15	1
Borussia Dortmund	Total		53	1	4	1	15	1	0	0	72	3
Bochum (loan)	2002–03	Bundesliga	11	0	1	0	—		—		12	0
Bochum (loan)	2003–04	Bundesliga	21	1	0	0	—		1	0	22	1
Bochum (loan)	Total		32	1	1	0	—		1	0	34	1
Genk	2005–06	Belgian First Division	16	0	1	0	2	0	—		19	0
Career total			321	18	20	1	40	3	2	0	383	22

=== International ===
Appearances and goals by national team and year
National team	Year	Apps	Goals	
Nigeria	1993	1	0	
Nigeria	1994	12	0	
Nigeria	1995	3	1	
Nigeria	1996	1	0	
Nigeria	1997	4	1	
Nigeria	1998	7	1	
Nigeria	1999	3	0	
Nigeria	2000	10	1	
Nigeria	2001	7	0	
Nigeria	2002	7	0	
Nigeria	Total		55	4

== Honours ==
Ajax

- Eredivisie: 1997–98
- KNVB Cup: 1997–98, 1998–99

Juventus

- UEFA Intertoto Cup: 1999

Borussia Dortmund

- Bundesliga: 2001–02
- UEFA Cup runner-up: 2001–02

Nigeria U23

- Olympic Gold Medal: 1996

Nigeria

- African Cup of Nations: 1994
- Afro-Asian Cup of Nations: 1995

== Notes ==
Sporting positions
Preceded by Uche Okechukwu	Nigeria captain 1998–2002	Succeeded by Jay-Jay Okocha
