= Rodrigue N'Doram =

Chadian footballer (born 1987)

Personal information
- Full name: Koulah Rodrigue N'Doram
- Date of birth: 25 November 1987 (age 38)
- Place of birth: N'Djamena, Chad
- Height: 1.87 m (6 ft 2 in)
- Position: Midfielder

Senior career*
| Years | Team | Apps | (Gls) |
| 2009–2012 | Carquefou | 13 | (0) |
| 2012–2013 | Cholet | 23 | (1) |
| 2014–2015 | Carquefou | | |
| 2015–2020 | Foullah Edifice | | |
| 2020–2023 | Menton | | |

International career
| 2015– | Chad | 2 | (0) |
- * Club domestic league appearances and goals

Koulah Rodrigue N'Doram (born 25 November 1987) is a Chadian former professional footballer who played as a midfielder. He made two appearances for the Chad national team, making his debut on 6 June 2015 in a 2–1 win against Guinea.

He is the son of former Chad international footballer Japhet N'Doram.
