= Churchill Oliseh =

Nigerian football manager

Churchill Oliseh is a Nigerian football manager who manages FC Ebedei. He is the father of Sekou Oliseh and brother of Azubuike Oliseh, Egutu Oliseh and Sunday Oliseh.

Churchill Oliseh is credited with discovering Nigerian international Obafemi Martins playing street football in Lagos.
