= 2016–17 Danish Superliga =

27th season of Danish Superliga

Alka Superliga
- Season: 2016–17
- Champions: Copenhagen
- Relegated: Esbjerg; Viborg
- Champions League: Copenhagen
- Europa League: Brøndby; Lyngby; Midtjylland
- Matches: 250
- Goals: 662 (2.65 per match)
- Top goalscorer: Marcus Ingvartsen (23 goals)
- Biggest home win: Copenhagen 5–0 Horsens
- Biggest away win: AGF 0–7 Brøndby
- Highest scoring: Silkeborg 5–3 AaB; AGF 6–2 Esbjerg
- Longest unbeaten run: Copenhagen (33)

The 2016–17 Danish Superliga season was the 27th season of the Danish Superliga, which decides the Danish football championship. The season was the first with a new league structure in which 14 clubs play each other home and away until the league is split up in championship and relegation play-offs. The new structure was inspired by the one used by the Belgian First Division A and was approved by the Danish FA, Dansk Boldspil-Union, on 28 June 2015.

The fixtures were announced on 6 June 2016.

== Teams ==
Hobro IK finished the 2015–16 season in 12th place and was relegated to the 2016–17 1st Division.

The relegated team was replaced by 2015–16 1st Division champions Lyngby Boldklub, while the 2nd and 3rd place teams, Silkeborg IF and AC Horsens, were promoted to bring the total teams in the league to 14.

On 23 October 2016, the home stadium for Odense Boldklub changed its name from TRE-FOR Park to EWII Park as a consequence of the current stadium sponsor changing its name.

On 31 December 2016, the previous sponsorship agreement for the home stadium of Aalborg BK, Nordjyske Arena, expired, and the stadium was officially referred to as Aalborg Stadium because a new sponsorship agreement was signed and took effect on 1 April 2017, renaming the stadium Aalborg Portland Park.

=== Stadia and locations ===
Locations of the Danish Superliga 2016–17 teams

Club	Location	Stadium	Turf	Capacity	2015–16 position
AaB	Aalborg	Nordjyske Arena (until 31 December 2016); Aalborg Stadium (1 January-31 March 2017); Aalborg Portland Park (from 1 April 2017)	Natural	13,797	5th
AC Horsens	Horsens	CASA Arena Horsens	Natural	10,400	1D, 3rd
AGF	Aarhus	Ceres Park	Natural	20,032	10th
Brøndby IF	Brøndby	Brøndby Stadium	Natural	29,000	4th
Esbjerg fB	Esbjerg	Blue Water Arena	Natural	18,000	11th
FC Copenhagen	Copenhagen	Telia Parken	Natural	38,065	1st
FC Midtjylland	Herning	MCH Arena	Natural	11,800	3rd
FC Nordsjælland	Farum	Right to Dream Park	Artificial	9,900	9th
Lyngby BK	Lyngby	Lyngby Stadion	Natural	8,000	1D, 1st
OB	Odense	TRE-FOR Park (until 22 October 2016); EWII Park (from 23 October 2016)	Natural	15,790	7th
Randers FC	Randers	BioNutria Park Randers	Natural	12,000	6th
Silkeborg IF	Silkeborg	MASCOT Park	Natural	10,000	1D, 2nd
SønderjyskE	Haderslev	Sydbank Park	Natural	10,000	2nd
Viborg FF	Viborg	Energi Viborg Arena	Natural	9,566	8th

=== Personnel and sponsoring ===
Note: Flags indicate national teams as have been defined under FIFA eligibility rules. Players and Managers may hold more than one non-FIFA nationality.

Team	Head coach	Captain	Kit manufacturer	Shirt sponsor
AaB	(Denmark) Morten Wieghorst	(Denmark) Rasmus Würtz	hummel	Spar Nord
AC Horsens	(Denmark) Bo Henriksen	(Denmark) Mathias Nielsen	hummel	
AGF	(Denmark) Glen Riddersholm	(Denmark) Morten Rasmussen	hummel	Ceres
Brøndby IF	(Germany) Alexander Zorniger	(Denmark) Thomas Kahlenberg	hummel	Bet25.dk
Esbjerg fB	(Denmark) Lars Lungi Sørensen	(Denmark) Jeppe Andersen	Nike	Stofa
F.C. Copenhagen	(Norway) Ståle Solbakken	(Denmark) Mathias Jørgensen	Adidas	Carlsberg
FC Midtjylland	(Denmark) Jess Thorup	(Denmark) Jakob Poulsen	Nike	Det Faglige Hus
FC Nordsjælland	(Denmark) Kasper Hjulmand	(Denmark) Patrick Mtiliga	Diadora	DHL
Lyngby BK	(Denmark) David Nielsen	(Denmark) Mathias Tauber	Adidas	Hellerup Finans
OB	(Denmark) Kent Nielsen	(Denmark) Kenneth Emil Petersen	hummel	Carlsberg
Randers FC	(Iceland) Ólafur Kristjánsson	(Denmark) Mads Fenger	Puma	Verdo
Silkeborg IF	(Denmark) Peter Sørensen	(Denmark) Dennis Flinta	uhlsport	Mascot International
SønderjyskE	(Denmark) Claus Nørgaard	(Denmark) Pierre Kanstrup	hummel	Frøs Herreds Sparekasse
Viborg	(Denmark) Johnny Mølby	(Denmark) Mikkel Rask	Nike	Andelskassen

=== Managerial changes ===
Team	Outgoing manager	Manner of departure	Date of vacancy	Replaced by	Date of appointment	Position in table
Brøndby IF	(Lithuania) Aurelijus Skarbalius	End of contract	30 May 2016	(Germany) Alexander Zorniger	13 June 2016	Pre-Season
Randers FC	(England) Colin Todd	Mutual consent	30 June 2016	(Iceland) Ólafur Kristjánsson	1 July 2016	Pre-Season
Esbjerg fB	(Denmark) Jonas Dal	Sacked	30 June 2016	(England) Colin Todd	8 July 2016	Pre-Season
Esbjerg fB	(England) Colin Todd	Sacked	5 December 2016	(Denmark) Lars Lungi Sørensen	5 December 2016	14th
AaB	(Denmark) Lars Søndergaard	Sacked	15 December 2016	(Denmark) Morten Wieghorst	2 January 2017	8th
SønderjyskE	(Denmark) Jakob Michelsen	Signed by Hammarby IF	31 December 2016	(Denmark) Claus Nørgaard	5 January 2017	6th

== Regular season ==
Pos	Team	Pld	W	D	L	GF	GA	GD	Pts	Qualification
1	Copenhagen	26	19	7	0	57	10	+47	64	Qualification for the championship round
2	Brøndby	26	15	7	4	52	23	+29	52	Qualification for the championship round
3	Lyngby	26	11	6	9	25	23	+2	39	Qualification for the championship round
4	SønderjyskE	26	10	9	7	30	32	−2	39	Qualification for the championship round
5	Midtjylland	26	10	8	8	44	29	+15	38	Qualification for the championship round
6	Nordsjælland	26	9	8	9	41	41	0	35	Qualification for the championship round
7	Randers	26	9	6	11	26	32	−6	33	Qualification for the relegation round
8	AaB	26	9	6	11	28	38	−10	33	Qualification for the relegation round
9	Silkeborg	26	7	9	10	31	46	−15	30	Qualification for the relegation round
10	Horsens	26	7	8	11	29	45	−16	29	Qualification for the relegation round
11	Odense	26	7	7	12	26	32	−6	28	Qualification for the relegation round
12	AGF	26	6	7	13	33	40	−7	25	Qualification for the relegation round
13	Viborg	26	6	7	13	29	40	−11	25	Qualification for the relegation round
14	Esbjerg	26	5	9	12	28	48	−20	24	Qualification for the relegation round

Source: DBU, Soccerway
Rules for classification: 1) Points; 2) Goal difference; 3) Goals scored; 4) Away goals scored; 5) Play-off (played on neutral ground if determining teams for different rounds); 6) Draw.

=== Positions by round ===
Team ╲ Round	1	2	3	4	5	6	7	8	9	10	11	12	13	14	15	16	17	18	19	20	21	22	23	24	25	26
Copenhagen	3	1	1	1	1	2	2	2	1	1	1	1	1	1	1	1	1	1	1	1	1	1	1	1	1	1
Brøndby	1	2	3	3	2	1	1	1	2	3	2	2	2	2	2	2	2	2	2	2	2	2	2	2	2	2
Lyngby Boldklub	12	12	7	5	6	6	7	8	7	7	6	4	5	4	5	5	5	5	5	5	5	3	4	4	3	3
SønderjyskE	11	9	12	12	12	13	13	12	10	10	7	7	6	7	6	6	6	6	6	6	6	6	7	5	5	4
Midtjylland	5	4	2	2	5	5	5	5	4	5	3	3	3	3	3	3	4	3	3	3	3	4	3	3	4	5
Nordsjælland	1	6	10	11	11	11	11	11	12	11	11	10	9	9	9	9	8	9	7	8	9	10	10	9	8	6
Randers FC	5	9	6	7	4	4	4	3	3	2	4	5	4	5	4	4	3	4	4	4	4	5	5	6	6	7
AaB	7	5	5	4	3	3	3	4	5	4	5	6	8	8	8	8	10	8	9	7	8	7	6	7	7	8
Silkeborg IF	9	11	13	14	13	14	14	14	14	14	12	12	12	10	11	11	9	11	10	11	10	8	9	8	9	9
Horsens	7	7	8	10	9	9	6	6	6	6	8	8	7	6	7	7	7	7	8	9	7	9	8	10	10	10
OB	9	7	8	8	8	8	10	10	11	12	13	13	13	13	13	13	12	12	13	12	13	13	13	11	12	11
AGF	4	3	4	6	7	7	9	7	9	8	9	11	10	11	10	10	11	10	11	10	11	11	11	12	11	12
Viborg FF	13	13	11	9	10	10	8	9	8	9	10	9	11	12	12	12	13	13	14	13	14	14	14	14	14	13
Esbjerg fB	13	14	14	13	14	12	12	13	13	13	14	14	14	14	14	14	14	14	12	14	12	12	12	13	13	14

Updated to match(es) played on 19 March 2016. Source: Weltfussball

=== Results ===
Home \ Away	ACH	AaB	AGF	BIF	EfB	FCK	FCN	FCM	LBK	OB	RFC	SJE	SIF	VFF
Horsens		3–0	1–5	0–2	1–0	0–2	0–0	1–5	2–1	1–1	1–0	1–1	3–3	1–2
AaB	1–1		2–1	0–1	2–1	1–2	1–1	1–1	1–0	2–2	2–1	0–1	3–0	1–0
AGF	1–1	1–2		0–7	6–2	0–1	3–1	1–1	0–1	1–2	1–2	1–2	0–0	2–1
Brøndby	2–2	2–0	1–0		4–0	1–1	2–3	2–1	3–2	3–0	2–2	4–0	3–1	1–2
Esbjerg fB	1–1	3–0	2–2	1–1		0–4	2–2	1–3	2–2	3–2	1–1	3–0	0–0	1–3
Copenhagen	5–0	1–1	2–0	0–0	2–0		4–0	3–1	3–0	2–0	1–0	4–0	2–0	4–0
Nordsjælland	2–1	1–2	3–2	1–1	3–0	1–1		0–4	0–1	0–1	1–1	2–3	5–1	4–3
Midtjylland	5–2	2–0	0–1	3–3	3–0	1–3	1–2		1–1	1–0	2–2	2–2	3–0	0–0
Lyngby Boldklub	0–1	1–0	0–0	1–0	0–0	0–1	0–1	1–0		2–2	0–2	2–0	1–1	1–0
OB	0–1	4–0	2–1	1–0	0–1	0–3	3–1	0–1	1–2		3–0	0–1	0–0	0–0
Randers FC	1–0	0–1	1–1	0–1	0–2	2–2	2–1	0–2	2–0	3–0		0–4	1–0	2–1
SønderjyskE	2–0	1–1	1–2	1–2	1–1	1–1	0–0	1–0	0–1	1–0	1–0		2–2	1–0
Silkeborg IF	1–0	5–3	1–0	0–2	3–0	1–3	2–2	2–1	0–4	1–1	2–0	1–1		1–5
Viborg FF	2–4	2–1	1–1	1–2	2–1	0–0	0–4	0–0	0–1	1–1	0–1	2–2	1–3	

Updated to match(es) played on 13 March 2017. Source: Danish Football Association and Superliga.dk (in Danish)
Legend: Blue = home team win; Yellow = draw; Red = away team win.

== Championship round ==
Points and goals carried over in full from regular season. The round began 2 April 2017.

Pos	Team	Pld	W	D	L	GF	GA	GD	Pts	Qualification
1	Copenhagen (C)	36	25	9	2	74	20	+54	84	Qualification for the Champions League second qualifying round
2	Brøndby	36	18	8	10	62	40	+22	62	Qualification for the Europa League second qualifying round
3	Lyngby	36	17	7	12	42	35	+7	58	Qualification for the Europa League first qualifying round
4	Midtjylland (O)	36	15	9	12	67	53	+14	54	Qualification for the European play-off final
5	Nordsjælland	36	13	10	13	59	55	+4	49	
6	SønderjyskE	36	12	10	14	44	54	−10	46	

Source: Soccerway
Rules for classification: 1) Points; 2) Goal difference; 3) Goals scored; 4) Away goals scored; 5) Play-off (played on neutral ground if determining champion or UEFA competitions); 6) Draw.
(C) Champions; (O) Play-off winners

=== Positions by round ===
Below, the positions per round are shown. As teams did not all start with an equal number of points, the initial pre-playoff positions are also given.

Team ╲ Round	Initial	1	2	3	4	5	6	7	8	9	10
Copenhagen	1	1	1	1	1	1	1	1	1	1	1
Brøndby	2	2	2	2	2	2	2	2	2	2	2
Lyngby Boldklub	3	3	5	5	3	4	4	3	3	3	3
Midtjylland	5	5	3	3	4	3	3	4	4	4	4
Nordsjælland	6	6	4	4	5	5	5	5	5	5	5
SønderjyskE	4	4	6	6	6	6	6	6	6	6	6

Updated to match(es) played on 21 May 2017. Source: Weltfussball

== Relegation round ==
Points and goals carried over in full from the regular season. The round began 2 April 2017.

=== Group A ===
Pos	Team	Pld	W	D	L	GF	GA	GD	Pts	Qualification or relegation
1	Randers	32	11	8	13	33	35	−2	41	Qualification for the European play-off quarter-finals
2	Odense	32	10	9	13	33	38	−5	39	Qualification for the European play-off quarter-finals
3	Horsens (O)	32	9	9	14	34	53	−19	36	Qualification for the relegation play-offs
4	Esbjerg (R)	32	6	12	14	32	54	−22	30	Qualification for the relegation play-offs

Source: Soccerway
Rules for classification: 1) Points; 2) Goal difference; 3) Goals scored; 4) Away goals scored; 5) Play-off.
(O) Play-off winners; (R) Relegated

=== Group B ===
Pos	Team	Pld	W	D	L	GF	GA	GD	Pts	Qualification or relegation
1	Silkeborg	32	9	11	12	36	51	−15	38	Qualification for the European play-off quarter-finals
2	AaB	32	10	8	14	30	45	−15	38	Qualification for the European play-off quarter-finals
3	AGF (O)	32	10	7	15	45	46	−1	37	Qualification for the relegation play-offs
4	Viborg (R)	32	8	9	15	35	47	−12	33	Qualification for the relegation play-offs

Source: Soccerway
Rules for classification: 1) Points; 2) Goal difference; 3) Goals scored; 4) Away goals scored; 5) Play-off.
(O) Play-off winners; (R) Relegated

== European play-offs ==
=== Bracket ===
Quarter-finals
13 and 16 May 2017
Odense	3	1	4
Silkeborg	1	2	3
12 and 17 May 2017
AaB	0	1	1
Randers	2	2	4

Semi-finals
20 and 29 May 2017
Odense	1	0	1
Randers	1	2	3

Final
1 June 2017
Midtjylland	3
Randers	0

=== European play-off quarter-finals ===
13 May 2017

Odense	3–1	Silkeborg
R. Jönsson 18'; M. Greve 69'; R. Festersen 76'		N. Helenius 35'

EWII Park, Odense
Attendance: 4805
Referee: Lars Christoffersen
16 May 2017

Silkeborg	2–1	Odense
R. Skov 51', 72'		M. Desler 70'

MASCOT Park, Silkeborg
Attendance: 2452
Referee: Michael Tykgaard

12 May 2017

AaB	0–2	Randers
		M. Pourié 26', 32'

Aalborg Portland Park, Aalborg
Attendance: 3681
Referee: Jørgen Burchardt
17 May 2017

Randers	2–1	AaB
Đurđić 34'; Lundberg 66'		Thellufsen 55'

AutoC Park Randers, Randers
Attendance: 3986
Referee: Peter Kjærsgaard-Andersen

=== European play-off semi-finals ===
20 May 2017

Odense	1–1	Randers
Jönsson 83'		Allansson 54'

EWII Park, Odense
Attendance: 4,447
Referee: Anders Poulsen
29 May 2017

Randers	2–0	Odense
Pourié 90'; Lundberg 90'

AutoC Park Randers, Randers
Attendance: 4924
Referee: Jørgen Daugbjerg Burchardt

=== European play-off final ===
1 June 2017

Midtjylland	3–0	Randers
Onuachu 37'; Nicolaisen 67'; Borring 69'

MCH Arena, Herning
Attendance: 5534
Referee: Mads-Kristoffer Kristoffersen

== Relegation play-offs ==
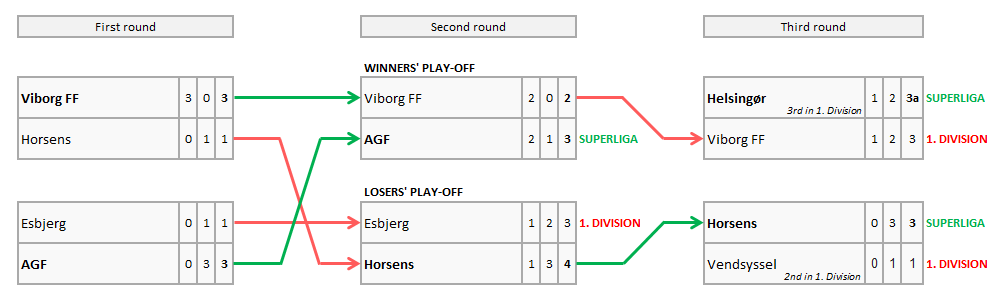

=== First round ===
14 May 2017

Esbjerg	0–0	AGF

Blue Water Arena, Esbjerg
Attendance: 6305
Referee: Anders Poulsen
17 May 2017

AGF	3–1	Esbjerg
Junker 3'; Sverrisson 55'; Rasmussen 90'		Hvilsom 28'

Ceres Park
Attendance: 10134
Referee: Mads-Kristoffer Kristoffersen

12 May 2017

Viborg FF	3–0	Horsens
F. Møller 21' (o.g.); Park Jung-bin 78'; O. Akharraz 87'

Energi Viborg Arena
Attendance: 3020
Referee: Michael Tykgaard
16 May 2017

Horsens	1–0	Viborg FF
Nymann 28'

CASA Arena Horsens, Horsens
Attendance: 1441
Referee: Jørgen Daugbjerg Burchardt

=== Second round ===
22 May 2017

Viborg FF	2–2	AGF
Park 10'; Déblé 89'		Rasmussen 15' (pen.); Junker 68'

Energi Viborg Arena, Viborg
Attendance: 8619
Referee: Peter Kjærsgaard-Andersen
28 May 2017

AGF	1–0	Viborg FF
Rasmussen 10'

Ceres Park, Aarhus
Attendance: 17462
Referee: Mads-Kristoffer Kristoffersen

20 May 2017

Esbjerg	1–1	Horsens
Söder 67'		Tshiembe 38'

Blue Water Arena, Esbjerg
Attendance: 5157
Referee: Michael Tykgaard
28 May 2017

Horsens	3–2	Esbjerg
Kryger 36'; Finnbogason 46' 73' (pen.)		Lungi Sørensen 41'; Zivzivadze 90'

Casa Arena Horsens, Horsens
Attendance: 5429
Referee: Jakob Kehlet

=== Third round ===
31 May 2017

Helsingør	1–1	Viborg FF
Minor Petersen 50'		Jakobsen 73'

Helsingør Stadion, Helsingør
Attendance: 3382
Referee: Michael Tykgaard
4 June 2017

Viborg FF	2–2 (a.e.t.)	Helsingør
Reese 83'; Vestergaard 92'		Christensen 60'; Riel 112'

Energi Viborg Arena, Viborg
Attendance: 5202
Referee: Jakob Kehlet

31 May 2017

Horsens	0–0	Vendsyssel

CASA Arena Horsens, Horsens
Attendance: 4037
Referee: Peter Kjaersgaard-Andersen
4 June 2017

Vendsyssel	1–3	Horsens
Tiago 40'		Jespersen 51'; Finnbogason 85'; Gemmer 90'

Hjørring Stadium, Hjørring
Attendance: 4386
Referee: Jørgen Daugbjerg

== Top goalscorers ==
As of 2 June 2017

Rank	Player	Club	Goals
1	(Denmark) Marcus Ingvartsen	Nordsjælland	23
2	(Finland) Teemu Pukki	Brøndby	20
3	(Nigeria) Paul Onuachu	Midtjylland	19
4	(Denmark) Morten Duncan Rasmussen	AGF	16
5	(Poland) Kamil Wilczek	Brøndby	13
6	(Denmark) Andreas Cornelius	Copenhagen	12
6	(Denmark) Emiliano Marcondes	Nordsjælland	12
6	(Paraguay) Federico Santander	Copenhagen	12
9	(Denmark) Jeppe Kjær	Lyngby	11
9	(Sweden) Robin Söder	Esbjerg	11
11	(Iceland) Kjartan Finnbogason	Horsens	10
11	(Germany) Marvin Pourié	Randers	10
11	(Denmark) Robert Skov	Silkeborg	10
11	(Denmark) Nicklas Helenius	Silkeborg	10

== Awards ==
=== Player of the Month ===
Month	Winners		Nominees	
Month	Player	Club	Players	Clubs
July	(Denmark) Rasmus Falk	Copenhagen	(Denmark) Thomas Delaney	Copenhagen
July	(Denmark) Rasmus Falk	Copenhagen	(Denmark) Andrew Hjulsager	Brøndby
August	(Finland) Teemu Pukki	Brøndby	(Denmark) Andrew Hjulsager	Brøndby
August	(Finland) Teemu Pukki	Brøndby	(Germany) Hany Mukhtar	Brøndby
September	(Denmark) Jesper Hansen	Lyngby	(Sweden) Simon Kroon	SønderjyskE
September	(Denmark) Jesper Hansen	Lyngby	(Denmark) Jeppe Kjær	Lyngby
October	(Denmark) Andreas Cornelius	Copenhagen	(Denmark) William Kvist	Copenhagen
October	(Denmark) Andreas Cornelius	Copenhagen	(Sweden) Mikael Ishak	Randers FC
November	(Denmark) Marcus Ingvartsen	Nordsjælland	(Denmark) Youssef Toutouh	Copenhagen
November	(Denmark) Marcus Ingvartsen	Nordsjælland	(Denmark) Mathias Jørgensen	Copenhagen
February	(Slovakia) Jakub Sylvestr	AaB	(Sweden) Rasmus Jönsson	OB
February	(Slovakia) Jakub Sylvestr	AaB	(Denmark) Mikkel Duelund	Midtjylland
March	(Denmark) Emiliano Marcondes	Nordsjælland	(Paraguay) Federico Santander	Copenhagen
March	(Denmark) Emiliano Marcondes	Nordsjælland	(Denmark) Marcus Ingvartsen	Nordsjælland
April	(Denmark) Marcus Ingvartsen	Nordsjælland	(Denmark) Frederik Rønnow	Brøndby
April	(Denmark) Marcus Ingvartsen	Nordsjælland	(Nigeria) Paul Onuachu	Midtjylland
May	(Nigeria) Paul Onuachu	Midtjylland	(Denmark) Mikkel Duelund	Midtjylland
May	(Nigeria) Paul Onuachu	Midtjylland	(Denmark) Jesper Hansen	Lyngby

== Attendances ==
No.	Club	Average	Highest
1	FC København	14,848	26,686
2	Brøndby IF	12,792	23,518
3	AGF	8,528	17,462
4	FC Midtjylland	7,332	10,624
5	AaB	5,902	11,727
6	OB	5,293	10,778
7	SønderjyskE	4,910	7,072
8	Randers FC	4,783	9,666
9	Esbjerg fB	4,409	6,305
10	Viborg FF	4,021	8,619
11	Silkeborg IF	3,088	5,819
12	FC Nordsjælland	2,981	8,180
13	Lyngby BK	2,773	7,073
14	AC Horsens	2,505	6,095
