= 2018–19 Danish Superliga =

29th season of Danish Superliga

Superliga
- Season: 2018–19
- Dates: 13 July 2018 – 26 May 2019
- Champions: Copenhagen
- Relegated: Vendsyssel; Vejle
- Champions League: Copenhagen
- Europa League: Midtjylland; Esbjerg; Brøndby
- Matches: 246
- Goals: 681 (2.77 per match)
- Top goalscorer: Robert Skov (29 goals)
- Biggest home win: Midtjylland 5–0 Vejle (11 November 2018); Copenhagen 6–1 OB (10 February 2019)
- Biggest away win: Hobro 0–5 AaB (23 September 2018); Horsens 1–6 Copenhagen (2 December 2018)
- Highest scoring: Midtjylland 5–2 Hobro (29 September 2018); Horsens 1–6 Copenhagen (2 December 2018); Copenhagen 6–1 OB (10 February 2019); Randers 4–3 SønderjyskE (12 May 2019); Esbjerg 4–3 Copenhagen (19 May 2019)
- Longest winning run: Copenhagen (8) (17 March 2019 – 5 May 2019)
- Longest unbeaten run: Copenhagen (22) (7 October 2018 – 5 May 2019)
- Longest winless run: Horsens (10) (24 February 2019 – 28 April 2019)
- Longest losing run: AGF (4) (28 October 2018 – 26 November 2018); SønderjyskE (4) (16 December 2018 – 22 February 2019); Horsens (4) (24 February 2019 – 17 March 2019)
- Highest attendance: 33,134; Copenhagen 3–2 Brøndby (5 May 2019)
- Lowest attendance: 1,012; Hobro 0–0 SønderjyskE (8 December 2018)
- Average attendance: 6,595

The 2018–19 Danish Superliga season was the 29th season of the Danish Superliga. Midtjylland were the defending champions. The season started on 13 July 2018 and ended on 26 May 2019.

== Teams ==
FC Helsingør finished as loser in the relegation play-offs in the 2017–18 season and was relegated to the 2018–19 1st Division along with Silkeborg IF, and Lyngby who lost their respective relegation play-offs as well.

The relegated teams were replaced by 2017–18 1st Division champions Vejle BK, who returned after nine years of absence, as well as the play-off winners Vendsyssel FF who got promoted to the top division for the first time ever, and Esbjerg fB who returned after a one-year absence.

=== Stadia and locations ===
Locations of the Danish Superliga 2018–19 teams

Club	Location	Stadium	Turf	Capacity	2017–18 position
AaB	Aalborg	Aalborg Portland Park	Natural	13,797	5th
AGF	Aarhus	Ceres Park	Natural	20,032	7th
Brøndby IF	Brøndby	Brøndby Stadium	Hybrid	29,000	2nd
Esbjerg fB	Esbjerg	Blue Water Arena	Natural	18,000	1D, 2nd
FC Copenhagen	Copenhagen	Telia Parken	Natural	38,065	4th
Hobro IK	Hobro	DS Arena	Natural	10,700	9th
AC Horsens	Horsens	CASA Arena Horsens	Natural	10,400	6th
FC Midtjylland	Herning	MCH Arena	Natural	11,800	1st
FC Nordsjælland	Farum	Right to Dream Park	Artificial	9,900	3rd
Odense BK	Odense	Nature Energy Park	Natural	15,633	10th
Randers FC	Randers	BioNutria Park Randers	Natural	12,000	11th
SønderjyskE	Haderslev	Sydbank Park	Natural	10,000	8th
Vejle BK	Vejle	Vejle Stadium	Natural	10,418	1D, 1st
Vendsyssel FF	Hjørring	Nord Energi Arena	Natural	7,500	1D, 3rd

=== Personnel and sponsoring ===
Note: Flags indicate national team as has been defined under FIFA eligibility rules. Players and Managers may hold more than one non-FIFA nationality.

Team	Head coach	Captain	Kit manufacturer	Shirt sponsor
AaB	(Denmark) Jacob Friis	(Denmark) Rasmus Würtz	Hummel	Spar Nord
AGF	(Denmark) David Nielsen	(Sweden) Niklas Backman	Hummel	Ceres
Brøndby	(Denmark) Martin Retov (interim)	(Germany) Benedikt Röcker	Hummel	Arbejdernes Landsbank
Esbjerg	(Netherlands) John Lammers	(Finland) Markus Halsti	Nike	Viking
FCK	(Norway) Ståle Solbakken	(Greece) Zeca	Adidas	Carlsberg
Hobro	(Denmark) Peter Sørensen	(Denmark) Jonas Damborg	Puma	DS Gruppen, Spar Nord
Horsens	(Denmark) Bo Henriksen	(Denmark) Mathias Nielsen	Hummel	NG Zink
Midtjylland	(Denmark) Kenneth Andersen	(Denmark) Jakob Poulsen	Nike	Det Faglige Hus
Nordsjælland	(Denmark) Flemming Pedersen	(Denmark) Victor Nelsson	Diadora	DHL
OB	(Denmark) Jakob Michelsen	(Denmark) Janus Drachmann	Hummel	Albani
Randers	(Denmark) Thomas Thomasberg	(Denmark) Nicolai Poulsen	Puma	Verdo
SønderjyskE	(Denmark) Glen Riddersholm	(Denmark) Marc Pedersen	Hummel	Frøs Herreds Sparekasse
Vejle	(Romania) Constantin Gâlcă	(Denmark) Jacob Schoop	Hummel	Arbejdernes Landsbank
Vendsyssel	(Denmark) Peter Enevoldsen	(Denmark) Alexander Juel Andersen	Diadora	Spar Nord

=== Managerial changes ===
Team	Outgoing manager	Manner of departure	Date of vacancy	Replaced by	Date of appointment	Position in table
OB	(Denmark) Kent Nielsen	Sacked	21 May 2018	(Denmark) Jakob Michelsen	29 May 2018	Pre-season
Randers FC	(Denmark) Rasmus Bertelsen	End of contract	30 June 2018	(Denmark) Thomas Thomasberg	1 July 2018	Pre-season
Hobro IK	(Denmark) Thomas Thomasberg	Signed by Randers	30 June 2018	(Denmark) Allan Kuhn	1 July 2018	Pre-season
FC Midtjylland	(Denmark) Jess Thorup	Signed by Gent	10 October 2018	(Denmark) Kenneth Andersen	10 October 2018	1st
AaB	(Denmark) Morten Wieghorst	Sacked	25 November 2018	(Denmark) Jacob Friis	25 November 2018	6th
SønderjyskE	(Denmark) Claus Nørgaard	Mutual consent	17 December 2018	(Denmark) Glen Riddersholm	1 February 2019	10th
Brøndby	(Germany) Alexander Zorniger	Sacked	18 February 2019	(Denmark) Martin Retov (interim)	19 February 2019	4th
Hobro IK	(Denmark) Allan Kuhn	Sacked	21 February 2019	(Denmark) Peter Sørensen	21 February 2019	14th
Vejle BK	(Italy) Adolfo Sormani	Resigned	5 March 2019	(Romania) Constantin Gâlcă	6 March 2019	14th
FC Nordsjælland	(Denmark) Kasper Hjulmand	Mutual consent	25 March 2019	(Denmark) Flemming Pedersen	25 March 2019	6th
Vendsyssel FF	(Denmark) Jens Berthel Askou	Sacked	20 May 2019	(Denmark) Peter Enevoldsen	20 May 2019	Playoffs

== Regular season ==
=== League table ===
Pos	Team	Pld	W	D	L	GF	GA	GD	Pts	Qualification
1	Copenhagen	26	19	4	3	65	23	+42	61	Qualification for the Championship round
2	Midtjylland	26	18	6	2	62	26	+36	60	Qualification for the Championship round
3	OB	26	12	6	8	35	31	+4	42	Qualification for the Championship round
4	Brøndby	26	11	5	10	44	40	+4	38	Qualification for the Championship round
5	Esbjerg	26	11	5	10	32	35	−3	38	Qualification for the Championship round
6	Nordsjælland	26	9	9	8	42	39	+3	36	Qualification for the Championship round
7	AaB	26	9	9	8	38	35	+3	36	Qualification for the Relegation round
8	Randers	26	9	7	10	29	34	−5	34	Qualification for the Relegation round
9	AGF	26	7	10	9	31	34	−3	31	Qualification for the Relegation round
10	Horsens	26	8	7	11	31	45	−14	31	Qualification for the Relegation round
11	SønderjyskE	26	7	7	12	30	37	−7	28	Qualification for the Relegation round
12	Vendsyssel	26	5	7	14	24	41	−17	22	Qualification for the Relegation round
13	Hobro	26	5	6	15	22	45	−23	21	Qualification for the Relegation round
14	Vejle	26	4	8	14	22	42	−20	20	Qualification for the Relegation round

Source: Danish Football Association (in Danish), Soccerway
Rules for classification: 1) Points; 2) Goal difference; 3) Goals scored; 4) Away goals scored; 5) Play-off (played on neutral ground if determining teams for different rounds); 6) Draw.

=== Positions by round ===
Team ╲ Round	1	2	3	4	5	6	7	8	9	10	11	12	13	14	15	16	17	18	19	20	21	22	23	24	25	26
Copenhagen	11	6	2	2	1	1	1	1	1	1	2	2	2	2	1	2	1	1	1	1	1	1	1	1	1	1
Midtjylland	9	12	8	4	3	3	2	2	2	2	1	1	1	1	2	1	2	2	2	2	2	2	2	2	2	2
OB	10	9	12	13	14	14	13	13	13	12	10	11	11	10	7	4	4	3	4	7	9	8	4	3	3	3
Brøndby	2	4	1	1	4	4	3	3	4	5	8	6	7	7	8	6	5	4	3	3	3	4	3	5	4	4
Esbjerg	6	10	13	12	10	8	6	6	5	6	7	4	3	3	3	3	3	5	6	4	5	3	5	4	5	5
Nordsjælland	7	7	5	7	9	6	9	9	7	9	6	8	9	9	11	10	10	9	9	9	10	9	6	6	7	6
AaB	5	2	4	3	2	2	4	4	3	3	3	3	4	5	5	7	7	6	7	5	6	10	7	7	8	7
Randers	14	13	10	9	8	5	7	7	10	7	9	10	10	11	10	9	8	8	8	6	4	5	8	9	6	8
AGF	8	8	11	5	5	7	5	5	8	4	4	5	6	6	9	11	11	11	11	10	8	7	10	8	9	9
Horsens	4	5	9	10	11	12	8	8	6	8	5	7	5	4	6	8	6	7	5	8	7	6	9	10	10	10
SønderjyskE	12	11	7	11	12	9	10	10	9	10	11	9	8	8	4	5	9	10	10	11	11	11	11	11	11	11
Vendsyssel	3	1	3	6	6	10	11	11	11	13	13	13	13	12	13	12	12	12	12	12	12	13	12	12	12	12
Hobro	13	14	14	14	13	13	14	14	14	14	14	14	14	14	14	14	14	14	14	14	14	14	13	13	13	13
Vejle	1	3	6	8	7	11	12	12	12	11	12	12	12	13	12	13	13	13	13	13	13	12	14	14	14	14

Source: Weltfussball

=== Results ===
Home \ Away	AAB	AGF	ACH	BIF	EFB	FCK	FCM	FCN	HOB	OB	RFC	SJE	VB	VEN
Aalborg	—	3–1	2–4	1–3	0–1	1–1	2–1	1–0	1–1	0–1	0–3	3–0	1–1	0–1
Aarhus	2–2	—	1–2	3–2	2–0	1–1	1–2	1–1	1–0	1–2	0–2	1–0	2–1	1–1
Horsens	0–0	3–2	—	1–3	1–2	1–6	1–3	3–3	2–2	1–2	1–1	1–1	0–0	3–0
Brøndby	3–3	2–0	1–2	—	0–1	0–1	2–2	2–0	1–0	1–1	2–1	2–4	1–1	2–3
Esbjerg	1–4	0–0	1–0	2–1	—	0–2	2–2	3–0	2–0	2–0	3–3	1–0	2–1	2–3
Copenhagen	4–0	4–2	1–2	3–1	3–0	—	2–1	2–1	3–1	6–1	4–0	3–2	2–0	1–1
Midtjylland	2–1	0–0	3–0	3–2	3–1	3–1	—	3–3	5–2	3–0	3–0	2–1	5–0	3–0
Nordsjælland	1–1	1–0	0–1	3–3	1–1	2–2	1–4	—	2–1	1–3	4–1	4–1	2–0	3–0
Hobro	0–5	0–2	0–0	1–2	2–0	0–3	1–2	3–2	—	3–2	0–1	0–0	1–0	1–0
OB	1–2	2–2	4–0	2–0	2–1	0–1	1–1	0–0	1–0	—	1–0	2–2	1–0	2–0
Randers	2–2	0–0	2–0	0–2	0–2	0–2	1–2	1–1	3–0	1–0	—	1–1	2–0	2–0
SønderjyskE	0–1	0–2	2–0	0–2	3–1	0–3	0–0	1–2	1–1	0–0	3–0	—	3–0	2–1
Vejle	1–1	1–1	3–1	1–2	1–0	1–3	1–3	1–3	3–1	0–2	1–1	2–0	—	1–1
Vendsyssel	0–1	2–2	0–1	1–2	1–1	2–1	0–1	0–1	1–1	3–2	0–1	2–3	1–1	—

Source: Danish Football Association (in Danish)
Legend: Blue = home team win; Yellow = draw; Red = away team win.

== Championship round ==
Points and goals will carry over in full from the regular season.

Pos	Team	Pld	W	D	L	GF	GA	GD	Pts	Qualification	COP	MID	ESB	BRO	ODE	NOR
1	Copenhagen (C)	36	26	4	6	86	37	+49	82	Qualification for the Champions League second qualifying round	—	3–0	1–0	3–2	4–0	1–3
2	Midtjylland	36	21	8	7	76	43	+33	71	Qualification for the Europa League third qualifying round	4–0	—	1–2	1–2	2–0	0–0
3	Esbjerg	36	16	8	12	45	47	−2	56	Qualification for the Europa League second qualifying round	4–3	2–2	—	1–0	0–0	0–0
4	Brøndby (O)	36	15	7	14	60	52	+8	52	Qualification for the European play-off match	1–2	4–1	0–1	—	2–2	2–0
5	Odense	36	14	10	12	48	48	0	52		0–1	3–1	4–1	0–2	—	2–2
6	Nordsjælland	36	10	14	12	52	54	−2	44		0–3	1–2	1–2	1–1	2–2	—

Source: Soccerway
Legend: Blue = home team win; Yellow = draw; Red = away team win.
(C) Champions; (O) Play-off winners

=== Positions by round ===
Below the positions per round are shown. As teams did not all start with an equal number of points, the initial pre-playoffs positions are also given.

Team ╲ Round	Initial	1	2	3	4	5	6	7	8	9	10
Copenhagen	1	1	1	1	1	1	1	1	1	1	1
Midtjylland	2	2	2	2	2	2	2	2	2	2	2
Esbjerg	5	5	5	4	3	3	3	3	4	3	3
Brøndby	4	4	4	5	5	5	5	5	5	5	4
Odense	3	3	3	3	4	4	4	4	3	4	5
Nordsjælland	6	6	6	6	6	6	6	6	6	6	6

== Relegation round ==
Points and goals will carry over in full from the regular season.

=== Group A ===
Pos	Team	Pld	W	D	L	GF	GA	GD	Pts	Qualification or relegation	AGF	SJE	ACH	VB
1	AGF	32	12	11	9	46	40	+6	47	Qualification for the European play-off quarter-finals	—	2–1	3–1	2–2
2	SønderjyskE	32	9	8	15	37	45	−8	35	Qualification for the European play-off quarter-finals	0–1	—	0–0	4–1
3	Horsens (O)	32	8	9	15	32	55	−23	33	Qualification for the relegation play-offs	0–3	0–1	—	0–0
4	Vejle (R)	32	6	10	16	34	53	−19	28	Qualification for the relegation play-offs	2–4	4–1	3–0	—

Source: Soccerway
Legend: Blue = home team win; Yellow = draw; Red = away team win.
Rules for classification: 1) Points; 2) Goal difference; 3) Goals scored; 4) Away goals scored; 5) Play-off.
(O) Play-off winners; (R) Relegated

=== Group B ===
Pos	Team	Pld	W	D	L	GF	GA	GD	Pts	Qualification or relegation	RAN	AAB	VEN	HOB
1	Randers	32	12	9	11	35	39	−4	45	Qualification for the European play-off quarter-finals	—	0–2	1–1	1–0
2	AaB	32	10	12	10	44	41	+3	42	Qualification for the European play-off quarter-finals	1–2	—	1–1	1–1
3	Vendsyssel (R)	32	6	11	15	32	49	−17	29	Qualification for the relegation play-offs	0–0	1–0	—	3–3
4	Hobro (O)	32	6	9	17	31	55	−24	27	Qualification for the relegation play-offs	1–2	1–1	3–2	—

Source: Soccerway
Legend: Blue = home team win; Yellow = draw; Red = away team win.
Rules for classification: 1) Points; 2) Goal difference; 3) Goals scored; 4) Away goals scored; 5) Play-off.
(O) Play-off winners; (R) Relegated

== European play-offs ==
The winning team from the 4-team knock-out tournament will advance to a Europa League play-off match. In the final, the team with the most points from the relegation round group stage will host the second leg.

If the 2018–19 Danish Cup winner, found on 17 May in the final, is involved in the play-offs, they will be withdrawn, as they will enter the Europa League third qualifying round directly.

Semi-finals
5 and 12 May 2019
SønderjyskE	1	3	4
Randers	1	4	5
5 and 12 May 2019
AaB	0	0	0
AGF	1	2	3

Final
18 and 26 May 2019
Randers	2	1	3
AGF	1	1	2

=== European play-off match ===
31 May 2019
19:00

Brøndby	4–2	Randers
Wilczek 55'; Kaiser 67'; Halimi 72'; Riis 89' (og.)	Report	Kallesøe 36'; Aaquist 51'

Brøndby Stadium
Referee: Michael Tykgaard

== Relegation play-offs ==
The relegation play-offs were streamlined slightly compared to the previous system, essentially doing away with the former first round.

First round
Match 1 (12 and 19 May 2019)
Vendsyssel	0	1	1
Horsens	1	1	2
Match 2 (12 and 19 May 2019)
Hobro	0	2	2
Vejle	1	0	1

Play-off matches
Match 3 (30 May and 2 June 2019)
Lyngby	2	2	4
Vendsyssel	1	2	3
Match 4 (30 May and 2 June 2019)
Hobro	1	2	3
Viborg	0	0	0

The winner of match 1 finished 11th and stayed in the Superliga, while the losers of match 2 finished 14th and were relegated directly.

== Top goalscorers ==
As of 26 May 2019

Rank	Player	Club	Goals
1	(Denmark) Robert Skov	Copenhagen	29
2	(Senegal) Dame N'Doye	Copenhagen	22
2	(Denmark) Andreas Skov Olsen	Nordsjælland	22
4	(Poland) Kamil Wilczek	Brøndby	21
5	(Nigeria) Paul Onuachu	Midtjylland	17
6	(Ghana) Godsway Donyoh	Nordsjælland	10
6	(Brazil) Allan Sousa	Vejle	10
6	(Denmark) Lucas Andersen	AaB	10
6	(Denmark) Bashkim Kadrii	OB	10
10	(Denmark) Viktor Fischer	Copenhagen	9
10	(Denmark) Patrick Mortensen	AGF	9
10	(Brazil) Evander da Silva Ferreira	Midtjylland	9

== Attendances ==
Pos	Team	Total	High	Low	Average	Change
1	Copenhagen	310,678	33,134	11,116	17,260	+25.9%
2	Brøndby	247,073	20,731	7,468	13,726	−12.5%
3	AGF	155,042	15,778	3,495	8,613	+7.2%
4	Midtjylland	131,647	10,973	4,906	7,314	−6.3%
5	OB	124,535	14,246	4,005	6,919	+32.5%
6	AaB	96,266	8,629	3,767	5,663	+4.1%
7	Esbjerg	100,913	9,841	2,654	5,606	n/a
8	Vejle	94,998	10,254	3,045	5,588	n/a
9	SønderjyskE	82,795	6,235	2,673	4,870	+6.5%
10	Randers	70,446	7,216	2,363	3,914	+4.6%
11	Horsens	62,382	7,612	1,712	3,670	+14.9%
12	Nordsjælland	63,019	8,353	1,738	3,501	−9.5%
13	Vendsyssel	40,436	6,415	1,053	2,379	n/a
14	Hobro	38,735	4,168	1,012	2,279	−10.7%
	League total	1,618,965	33,134	1,012	6,581	+11.9%

Updated to games played on 26 May 2019
Source: World Football
