= 2019 Danish Cup final =

- Event: 2018–19 Danish Cup
FC Midtjylland	Brøndby IF
1	1
- Midtjylland won 4–3 on penalties
- Date: 17 May 2019
- Venue: Parken Stadium, Copenhagen
- Man of the Match: Gustav Wikheim (Midtjylland)
- Referee: Peter Kjærsgaard-Andersen
- Attendance: 31,340

The 2019 Danish Cup final was played on 17 May 2019 between FC Midtjylland and Brøndby IF at Parken Stadium, Copenhagen, a neutral ground. The final is the culmination of the 2018–19 Danish Cup, the 65th season of the Danish Cup.

Brøndby IF appeared in their 10th Danish Cup final (third consecutive) and were the defending title-holders. FC Midtjylland had never won a Danish Cup title before the match, being four times the runners-up. The winner of the final earned themselves a place in at least the second qualifying round of the 2019–20 UEFA Europa League.

FC Midtjylland won the final after a penalty shoot-out and earned their first ever Danish Cup title.

== Teams ==
Team	Previous finals appearances (bold indicates winners)
FC Midtjylland	4 (2003, 2005, 2010, 2011)
Brøndby IF	9 (**1989**, 1996, **1998**, **2003**, **2005**, **2008**, 2017, **2018**)

== Venue ==
All Cup Finals except the 1991 final (Odense Stadium) and 1992 final (Aarhus Idrætspark) have been played in the Copenhagen Sports Park (1955–1990), or Parken Stadium (1993–present)

== Background ==
Brøndby is competing in its third consecutive final, losing to F.C. Copenhagen in 2017 and capturing the title over Silkeborg IF in 2018. FC Midtjylland is appearing in its fifth final, losing all four if its previous appearances. The two teams have previously met in the 2003 and 2005 finals, and the teams share an equal 1-1-1 record during the regular season of the 2018–19 Danish Superliga.

== Route to the final ==
Note: In all results below, the score of the finalist is given first (H: home; A: away).

FC Midtjylland		Round	Brøndby IF	
Opponent	Result		Opponent	Result
Bye		Second round	Bye	
Dalum IF	2–1 (a.e.t.) (A)	Third round	Hillerød	4–1 (A)
Copenhagen	2–0 (H)	Fourth round	Marienlyst	4–1 (A)
Kolding	2–0 (A)	Quarterfinals	Vendsyssel	2–0 (A)
Odense BK	4–0 (H)	Semifinals	Aalborg BK	1–0 (H)

== Match ==
=== Details ===
17 May 2019
20:00

FC Midtjylland (1)	1–1 (a.e.t.)	Brøndby IF (1)
K. Hansen 6'	Report	Kaiser 21'
Penalties
Poulsen (penalty scored); Thychosen (penalty missed); Dal Hende (penalty scored); Mabil (penalty scored); Scholz (penalty scored)	4–3	(penalty missed) Kaiser; (penalty scored) Jung; (penalty scored) Wilczek; (penalty missed) Radošević; (penalty scored) Halimi

Parken Stadium, Copenhagen
Attendance: 31,340
Referee: Peter Kjærsgaard-Andersen

**Midtjylland**	**Brøndby IF**

GK	1	(Denmark) Jesper Hansen
DF	2	(Denmark) Kian Hensen	(substituted off) 94'
DF	28	(Denmark) Erik Sviatchenko
DF	4	(Denmark) Marc Dal Hende
DF	14	(Denmark) Alexander Scholz
DF	24	(Denmark) Mads Døhr Thychosen
MF	7	(Denmark) Jakob Poulsen (c)	(yellow card) 50'
MF	3	(Finland) Tim Sparv
MF	88	(Norway) Gustav Wikheim	(substituted off) 106'
MF	10	(Brazil) Evander	(substituted off) 66'
FW	33	(Nigeria) Paul Onuachu	(substituted off) 100' (yellow card) 31'
Substitutes:
MF	38	(Nigeria) Frank Onyeka	(substituted on) 66'
DF	20	(Denmark) Rasmus Nicolaisen	(substituted on) 94'
FW	26	(Ukraine) Artem Dovbyk	(substituted on) 100'
MF	11	(Australia) Awer Mabil	(substituted on) 106'
DF	6	(Sweden) Joel Andersson
GK	31	(Denmark) Mikkel Andersen
MF	36	(Nigeria) Rilwan Hassan
Coach:
(Denmark) Kenneth Andersen

GK	1	(Germany) Marvin Schwäbe
DF	23	(Finland) Paulus Arajuuri
DF	3	(Germany) Anthony Jung
DF	6	(Iceland) Hjörtur Hermannsson
MF	7	(Germany) Dominik Kaiser
MF	22	(Croatia) Josip Radošević
MF	10	(Germany) Hany Mukhtar	(substituted off) 115'
FW	20	(Poland) Kamil Wilczek (c)	(yellow card) 120'
FW	14	(Denmark) Kevin Mensah
MF	12	(Sweden) Simon Hedlund	(substituted off) 74'
FW	11	(Denmark) Mikael Uhre	(substituted off) 63'
Substitutes:
FW	18	(Denmark) Nikolai Laursen	(substituted on) 63'
MF	12	(Sweden) Simon Tibbling	(substituted on) 74' (substituted off) 120'
MF	21	(Denmark) Lasse Vigen	(substituted on) 115'
MF	5	(Kosovo) Besar Halimi	(substituted on) 120'
GK	16	(Germany) Benjamin Bellot
DF	4	(Germany) Benedikt Röcker
DF	2	(Denmark) Jens Martin Gammelby
Coach:
(Denmark) Martin Retov

Assistant referees:
Ole Kronlykke
Niels Høg

**Match rules**

- 90 minutes.
- 30 minutes of extra time if necessary.
- Penalty shoot-out if scores still level.
- Seven named substitutes, of which up to three may be used.
