= 2011 in UEFA =

The following are the scheduled events, results and champions of association football for the year 2011 throughout the Union of European Football Associations.

== Scheduled events ==
=== Men's football ===
- 3–15 May — 2011 UEFA European Under-17 Football Championship in Serbia
- 12 – 25 June — 2011 UEFA European Under-21 Football Championship in Denmark
- 20 July – 1 August — 2011 UEFA European Under-19 Football Championship in Romania

=== Women's football ===
- 2 – 9 March — 2011 Algarve Cup in Portugal
  - (gold) United States
  - (silver) Iceland
  - (bronze) Japan
  - 4th: Sweden

== Headlines ==
- 31 January: The 4th highest transfer fee in football history (£49.5m) was recorded, when Fernando Torres signed for Chelsea F.C. from Liverpool F.C. Andy Carroll's same-day move from Newcastle United to Liverpool for £35m was the eighth highest fee received for a player.
- 5 May: Skënderbeu win the 2010–11 Albanian Superliga championship, making it the first time since 1933 that the club has won the top division of Albanian football.
- 18 May: Held in Dublin, the 2011 UEFA Europa League Final was an all Portuguese affair, with Porto defeating Braga in the final. Porto earned a berth into the 2011 UEFA Super Cup.
- 28 May: Barcelona of Spain defeat Manchester United of England 3–1 in the 2011 UEFA Champions League Final. Barcelona was rewarded with an automatic berth into the 2011 FIFA Club World Cup, 2011 UEFA Super Cup and next year's Champions League.
- 26 August: Barcelona defeats Porto 2–0 at Stade Louis II in Monaco to win the 2011 UEFA Super Cup.

== International football ==
=== Men's events ===
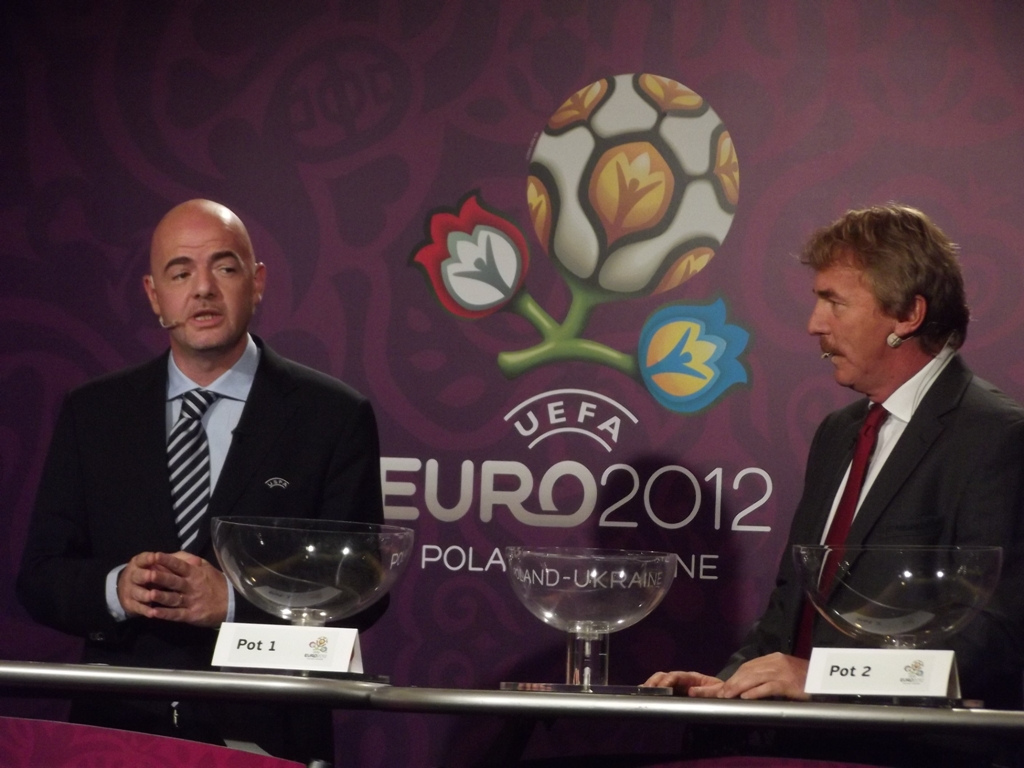
Gianni Infantino (left) and Zbigniew Boniek during a draw for the play-offs

Most notably, 2011 consisted of all men's UEFA teams competing in qualification for UEFA Euro 2012. As tournament hosts, both Poland and Ukraine earned direct qualification into Group Stage.

The qualification season ended on 11 October 2011, with group winners earning berths into Euro 2012. For group runners-up, the highest ranked second team qualified automatically for the tournament, while the remainder entered the play-offs. As some groups contain six teams and some five, matches against the sixth-placed team in each group were not included in this ranking. As a result, a total of eight matches played by each team count toward the purpose of the second-placed ranking table.

The teams, other than the hosts, to qualify for the tournament included: Croatia, Czech Republic, Denmark, England, France, Germany, Greece, Italy, the Netherlands, Portugal, Republic of Ireland, Russia, Spain and Sweden.

=== Women's events ===
The German Football Association hosted the 2011 FIFA Women's World Cup, making it the first time since 1995 a European nation hosted the FIFA Women's World Cup. While the German nation team was eliminated in the quarterfinals, two UEFA nations, namely Sweden and France reached the semifinals of the World Cup. Both teams lost, however, to Japan and the United States, respectively. Goals from Sweden's Lotta Schelin and Marie Hammarström gave the Swedes a 2–1 victory over France in the consolation match.

Considered the second largest international women's football tournament, the Portugal's 2011 edition of the Algarve Cup took place. While the final was not won by a European side, Iceland reached the final match before losing to the United States. Sweden reached the consolation match, but lost to Japan.

== Club football ==
=== Continental champions ===
==== Men's football ====
===== Champions League =====
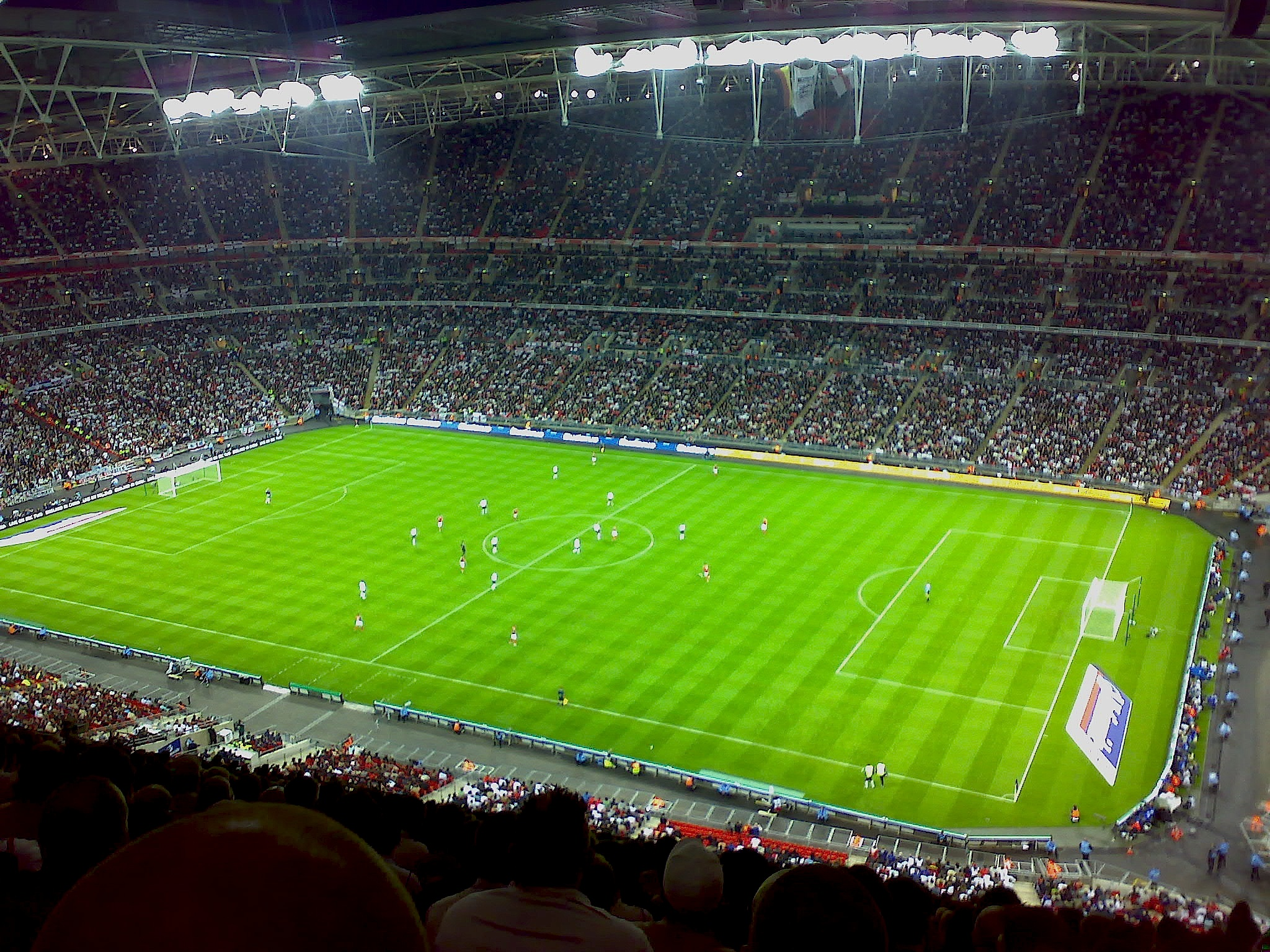
Wembley Stadium hosted the 2011 UEFA Champions League Final.

Barcelona of Spain's La Liga won the 2010–11 edition of the UEFA Champions League, making it the fourth time the club won either the Champions League or European Cup. Barcelona defeated Manchester United of England's Premier League in the championship. The final was played at Wembley Stadium in London, making it the first time since renovations that the venue hosted the Champions League final.

The entire knockout round of the tournament was played in 2011, beginning with sixteen clubs from seven different UEFA nations. The five largest leagues by UEFA coefficients had at least two representatives in the knockout phase of the tournament. Outside of the "big five", Denmark's Copenhagen and Ukraine's Shakhtar Donetsk earned berths into the knockout round, with Shakhtar Donetsk reaching the quarterfinals, before losing to eventual champions, Barcelona.

Lionel Messi of Barcelona was the tournament's top-scorer scoring twelve goals in thirteen appearances.

Bracket

Round of 16
(France) Lyon	1	0	1
(Spain) Real Madrid	1	3	4
(Italy) Milan	0	0	0
(England) Tottenham Hotspur	1	0	1
(England) Arsenal	2	1	3
(Spain) Barcelona	1	3	4
(Italy) Roma	2	0	2
(Ukraine) Shakhtar Donetsk	3	3	6
(Italy) Internazionale (a)	0	3	3
(Germany) Bayern Munich	1	2	3
(Spain) Valencia	1	1	2
(Germany) Schalke 04	1	3	4
(Denmark) Copenhagen	0	0	0
(England) Chelsea	2	0	2
(France) Marseille	0	1	1
(England) Manchester United	0	2	2

Quarter-finals
(Spain) Real Madrid	4	1	5
(England) Tottenham Hotspur	0	0	0
(Spain) Barcelona	5	1	6
(Ukraine) Shakhtar Donetsk	1	0	1
(Italy) Internazionale	2	1	3
(Germany) Schalke 04	5	2	7
(England) Chelsea	0	1	1
(England) Manchester United	1	2	3

Semi-finals
(Spain) Real Madrid	0	1	1
(Spain) Barcelona	2	1	3
(Germany) Schalke 04	0	1	1
(England) Manchester United	2	4	6

Final
28 May – London
(Spain) Barcelona	3
(England) Manchester United	1

===== Europa League =====
Round of 32
(Greece) PAOK	0	1	1
(Russia) CSKA Moscow	1	1	2
(Spain) Sevilla	1	1	2
(Portugal) Porto (a)	2	0	2
(Belgium) Anderlecht	0	0	0
(Netherlands) Ajax	2	3	5
(Switzerland) Basel	2	1	3
(Russia) Spartak Moscow	3	1	4
(Ukraine) Metalist Kharkiv	0	0	0
(Germany) Bayer Leverkusen	2	4	6
(Italy) Napoli	0	1	1
(Spain) Villarreal	0	2	2
(Russia) Rubin Kazan	0	2	2
(Netherlands) Twente	2	2	4
(Switzerland) Young Boys	2	1	3
(Russia) Zenit Saint Petersburg	1	3	4
(Portugal) Benfica	2	2	4
(Germany) VfB Stuttgart	1	0	1
(Belarus) BATE Borisov	2	0	2
(France) Paris Saint-Germain (a)	2	0	2
(France) Lille	2	1	3
(Netherlands) PSV Eindhoven	2	3	5
(Scotland) Rangers (a)	1	2	3
(Portugal) Sporting CP	1	2	3
(Turkey) Beşiktaş	1	0	1
(Ukraine) Dynamo Kyiv	4	4	8
(Greece) Aris	0	0	0
(England) Manchester City	0	3	3
(Poland) Lech Poznań	1	0	1
(Portugal) Braga	0	2	2
(Czech Republic) Sparta Prague	0	0	0
(England) Liverpool	0	1	1

Round of 16
(Russia) CSKA Moscow	0	1	1
(Portugal) Porto	1	2	3
(Netherlands) Ajax	0	0	0
(Russia) Spartak Moscow	1	3	4
(Germany) Bayer Leverkusen	2	1	3
(Spain) Villarreal	3	2	5
(Netherlands) Twente	3	0	3
(Russia) Zenit Saint Petersburg	0	2	2
(Portugal) Benfica	2	1	3
(France) Paris Saint-Germain	1	1	2
(Netherlands) PSV Eindhoven	0	1	1
(Scotland) Rangers	0	0	0
(Ukraine) Dynamo Kyiv	2	0	2
(England) Manchester City	0	1	1
(Portugal) Braga	1	0	1
(England) Liverpool	0	0	0

Quarter-finals
(Portugal) Porto	5	5	10
(Russia) Spartak Moscow	1	2	3
(Spain) Villarreal	5	3	8
(Netherlands) Twente	1	1	2
(Portugal) Benfica	4	2	6
(Netherlands) PSV Eindhoven	1	2	3
(Ukraine) Dynamo Kyiv	1	0	1
(Portugal) Braga (a)	1	0	1

Semi-finals
(Portugal) Porto	5	2	7
(Spain) Villarreal	1	3	4
(Portugal) Benfica	2	0	2
(Portugal) Braga (a)	1	1	2

Final
18 May – Dublin
(Portugal) Porto	1
(Portugal) Braga	0

==== Women's football ====
===== Champions League =====
In the tenth edition of the UEFA Women's Champions League, France's Lyon won their first ever title, defeating Germany's Turbine Potsdam in the final. The final, like the Men's Champions League, was also played at London, but at the Craven Cottage.

Bracket

Round of 32
(Belarus) Zorka-BDU Minsk	1	0	1
(Norway) Røa	2	0	2
(Cyprus) Apollon Limassol	1	1	2
(Russia) Zvezda Perm	2	2	4
(Ukraine) Lehenda-ShVSM	1	0	1
(Russia) Rossiyanka	3	4	7
(Netherlands) AZ	1	0	1
(France) Lyon	2	8	10
(Spain) Rayo Vallecano	3	1	4
(Iceland) Valur	0	1	1
(Serbia) Mašinac Niš	1	0	1
(England) Arsenal	3	9	12
(Slovenia) Krka	0	0	0
(Sweden) Linköping	7	5	12
(Belgium) Sint-Truiden	0	0	0
(Czech Republic) Sparta Prague	3	7	10
(Poland) Unia Racibórz	1	1	2
(Denmark) Brøndby (a)	2	0	2
(Hungary) MTK Hungária	0	1	1
(England) Everton	0	7	7
(Kazakhstan) CSHVSM	0	0	0
(Germany) Duisburg	5	6	11
(Denmark) Fortuna	8	6	14
(Italy) Bardolino	0	1	1
(Switzerland) Zürich	2	1	3
(Italy) Torres	3	4	7
(Iceland) Breiðablik	0	0	0
(France) Juvisy	3	6	9
(Finland) Åland United	0	0	0
(Germany) Turbine Potsdam	9	6	15
(Greece) PAOK	1	0	1
(Austria) Neulengbach	0	3	3

Round of 16
(Norway) Røa	1	0	1
(Russia) Zvezda Perm	1	4	5
(Russia) Rossiyanka	1	0	1
(France) Lyon	6	5	11
(Spain) Rayo Vallecano	2	1	3
(England) Arsenal	0	4	4
(Sweden) Linköping	2	1	3
(Czech Republic) Sparta Prague	0	0	0
(Denmark) Brøndby	1	1	2
(England) Everton	4	1	5
(Germany) Duisburg	4	3	7
(Denmark) Fortuna	2	0	2
(Italy) Torres	1	2	3
(France) Juvisy (a.e.t.)	2	2	4
(Germany) Turbine Potsdam	7	9	16
(Austria) Neulengbach	0	0	0

Quarter-finals
(Russia) Zvezda Perm	0	0	0
(France) Lyon	0	1	1
(England) Arsenal (a)	1	2	3
(Sweden) Linköping	1	2	3
(England) Everton	1	1	2
(Germany) Duisburg	3	2	5
(France) Juvisy	0	2	2
(Germany) Turbine Potsdam	3	6	9

Semi-finals
(France) Lyon	2	3	5
(England) Arsenal	0	2	2
(Germany) Duisburg	2	0	2
(Germany) Turbine Potsdam	2	1	3

Final
(France) Lyon	2
(Germany) Turbine Potsdam	0

=== Domestic league champions ===
==== Men's football ====
Nation	League	Champion	Title	Last Honor	Ref.
Albania	2010–11 Albanian Superliga	Skënderbeu Korçë	2nd	1933	
Andorra	2010–11 Primera Divisió	Santa Coloma	6th	2009–10	
Armenia	2011 Armenian Premier League	Ulisses	1st	—	
Austria	2010–11 Austrian Football Bundesliga	Sturm Graz	3rd	1998–99	
Azerbaijan	2010–11 Azerbaijan Premier League	Neftchi Baku	6th	2004–05	
Belarus	2011 Belarusian Premier League	BATE Borisov	8th	2010	
Belgium	2010–11 Jupiler League	Genk	3rd	2001–02	
Bosnia and Herzegovina	2010–11 Premijer Liga	Borac Banja Luka	1st	—	
Bulgaria	2010–11 A PFG	Litex Lovech	4th	2009–10	
Croatia	2010–11 Prva HNL	Dinamo Zagreb	13th^{[A]}	2009–10	
Cyprus	2010–11 Cypriot First Division	APOEL	21st	2008–09	
Czech Republic	2010–11 Gambrinus liga	Viktoria Plzeň	1st	—	
Denmark	2010–11 Danish Superliga	Copenhagen	9th	2009–10	
England	2010–11 Premier League	Manchester United	19th^{[B]}	2008–09	
Estonia	2011 Meistriliiga	Flora	9th	2010	
Faroe Islands	2011 Vodafonedeildin	B36 Tórshavn	8th	2005	
Finland	2011 Veikkausliiga	HJK Helsinki	24th	2010	
France	2010–11 Ligue 1	Lille	3rd	1953–54	
(Georgia (country)) Georgia	2010–11 Umaglesi Liga	Zestafoni	1st	—	
Germany	2010–11 Bundesliga	Borussia Dortmund	7th	2001–02	
Greece	2010–11 Super League Greece	Olympiacos	38th	2008–09	
Hungary	2010–11 NB I	Videoton	1st	—	
Iceland	2011 Úrvalsdeild	KR Reykjavík	25th	2003	
(Republic of Ireland) Ireland	2011 League of Ireland	Shamrock Rovers	17th	2010	
Israel	2010–11 Israeli Premier League	Maccabi Haifa	12th^{[C]}	2008–09	
Italy	2010–11 Serie A	Milan	18th	2003–04	
Kazakhstan	2011 Kazakhstan Premier League	Shakhter Karagandy	1st	—	
Latvia	2011 Latvian Higher League	Ventspils	4th	2008	
Lithuania	2011 A Lyga	Ekranas	6th^{[D]}	2010	
Luxembourg	2010–11 Luxembourg National Division	F91 Dudelange	9th	2008–09	
(North Macedonia) Macedonia	2010–11 Macedonian Prva Liga	Škendija	1st	—	
Malta	2010–11 Maltese Premier League	Valletta	20th	2007–08	
Moldova	2010–11 Moldovan National Division	Dacia Chişinău	1st	—	
Montenegro	2010–11 Montenegrin First League	Mogren	2nd	2008–09	
Netherlands	2010–11 Eredivisie	Ajax	30th	2003–04	
Northern Ireland	2010–11 IFA Premiership	Linfield	50th	2010	
Norway	2011 Tippeligaen	Molde	1st	—	
Poland	2010–11 Ekstraklasa	Wisła Kraków	14th	2008–09	
Portugal	2010–11 Primeira Liga	Porto	25th	2008–09	
Romania	2010–11 Liga I	Oţelul Galaţi	1st	—	
Russia	Russian Premier League	^{[E]}	N/A	N/A	
San Marino	2010–11 Campionato Sammarinese di Calcio	Tre Fiori	7th	2009–10	
Scotland	2010–11 Scottish Premier League	Rangers	54th	2009–10	
Serbia	2010–11 Serbian Superliga	Partizan	4th	2009–10	
Slovakia	2010–11 Slovak Superliga	Slovan Bratislava	10th	2008–09	
Slovenia	2010–11 Slovenian PrvaLiga	Maribor	9th	2008–09	
Spain	2010–11 La Liga	Barcelona	21st	2009–10	
Sweden	2011 Allsvenskan	Helsingborg	7th	1999	
Switzerland	2010–11 Swiss Super League	Basel	14th	2009–10	
Turkey	2010–11 Süper Lig	Fenerbahçe	18th	2006–07	
Ukraine	2010–11 Ukrainian Premier League	Shakhtar Donetsk	6th	2009–10	
Wales	2010–11 Welsh Premier League	Bangor City	3rd	1994–95	

==== Women's football ====
Nation	League	Champion	Title	Last Honor	Ref.

=== Domestic Cup Champions ===
==== Men's Football ====
Nation	Competition	Champion	Title	Last Honor
Albania	2010–11 Albanian Cup	Tirana	14th	2005–06
Austria	2010–11 Austrian Cup	SV Reid	2nd	1997–98
Belgium	2010–11 Belgian Cup	Standard Liège	6th	1992–93
Bosnia and Herzegovina	2010–11 Bosnia and Herzegovina Football Cup	Željezničar	4th	2002–03
Bulgaria	2010–11 Bulgarian Cup	CSKA Sofia	19th	2005–06
Croatia	2010–11 Croatian Football Cup	Dinamo Zagreb	11th	2008–09
Czech Republic	2010–11 Czech Cup	Mladá Boleslav	1st	—
Denmark	2010–11 Danish Cup	FC Nordsjælland	2nd	2009–10
England	2010–11 FA Cup	Manchester City	5th	1968–69
England	2010–11 Football League Cup	Birmingham City	2nd	1962–63
Finland	2011 Finnish Cup	HJK Helsinki	11th	2008
France	2010–11 Coupe de France	Lille	6th	1954–55
France	2010–11 Coupe de la Ligue	Marseille	3rd	2009–10
Germany	2010–11 DFB-Pokal	Schalke 04	5th	2001–02
Greece	2010–11 Greek Cup	AEK Athens	14th	2001–02
Hungary	2010–11 Magyar Kupa	Kecskemét	1st	—
(Republic of Ireland) Ireland	2011 FAI Cup	Sligo Rovers	4th	2010
(Republic of Ireland) Ireland	2011 League of Ireland Cup	Derry City	10th	2008
Italy	2010–11 Coppa Italia	Internazionale	7th	2009–10
Liechtenstein	2010–11 Liechtenstein Cup	FC Vaduz	39th	2009–10
Montenegro	2010–11 Montenegrin Cup	FK Rudar	3rd	2009–10
Netherlands	2010–11 KNVB Cup	Twente	3rd	2000–01
Northern Ireland	2010–11 Irish Cup	Linfield	41st	2009–10
Northern Ireland	2010–11 Irish League Cup	Lisbun Distillery	1st	—
Norway	2011 Norwegian Football Cup	Aalesund	2nd	2009
Poland	2010–11 Polish Cup	Legia Warsaw	14th	2007–08
Portugal	2010–11 Taça de Portugal	Porto	16th	2009–10
Portugal	2010–11 Taça da Liga	Benfica	3rd	2009–10
Romania	2010–11 Cupa României	Steaua București	21st	1998–99
Russia	2010–11 Russian Cup	CSKA Moscow	11th	2008–09
Scotland	2010–11 Scottish Cup	Celtic	35th	2006–07
Scotland	2010–11 Scottish League Cup	Rangers	27th	2009–10
Serbia	2010–11 Serbian Cup	Partizan	3rd	2008–09
Slovakia	2010–11 Slovak Cup	Slovan Bratislava	12th	2009–10
Slovenia	2010–11 Slovenian Cup	Domžale	1st	—
Spain	2010–11 Copa del Rey	Real Madrid	18th	1992–93
Sweden	2011 Svenska Cupen	Helsingborg	5th	2010
Switzerland	2010–11 Swiss Cup	FC Sion	12th	2008–09
Turkey	2010–11 Turkish Cup	Beşiktaş	9th	2008–09
Ukraine	2010–11 Ukrainian Cup	Shaktar Donetsk	7th	2007–08
Wales	2010–11 Welsh Cup	Llanelli Town	1st	—
Wales	2010–11 Welsh League Cup	The New Saints	5th	2009–10

== Footnotes ==
A Including the Yugoslav First League, Dinamo Zagreb has won a total of 19 top division domestic football championships.
B Includes Manchester United's First Division (pre-1992) and Premier League (since 1992) championships.
C Includes Maccabi Haifa's Israel First Division and Premier League championships.
D Includes FK Ekranas' Soviet Lithuania league championship along with their A Lyga titles.
E The Russian Premier League is switching to the FIFA calendar and a 2011–12 calendar. The previous season was 2010, and there will be no champion crowned in 2011.
