= Jakob Poulsen =

Danish footballer (born 1983)

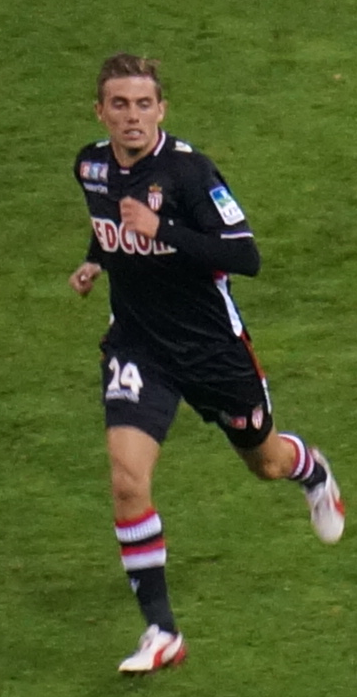
- Poulsen playing for Monaco in 2013

Personal information
- Full name: Jakob Bendix Uhd Poulsen
- Date of birth: 7 July 1983 (age 43)
- Place of birth: Varde, Denmark
- Height: 1.81 m (5 ft 11 in)
- Position: Midfielder

Team information
- Current team: AGF (head coach)

Youth career
- Næsbjerg RUI
- 1999–2002: Esbjerg fB

Senior career*
Years	Team	Apps	(Gls)
2001–2006	Esbjerg fB	107	(19)
2006–2008	Heerenveen	57	(3)
2008–2010	AGF	54	(10)
2010–2012	Midtjylland	46	(9)
2012–2014	Monaco	17	(0)
2014–2019	Midtjylland	185	(33)
2019–2020	Melbourne Victory	16	(0)
Total		482	(74)

International career
2000–2001	Denmark U19	5	(0)
2002–2004	Denmark U20	7	(0)
2003–2006	Denmark U21	16	(1)
2009–2015	Denmark	35	(2)

Managerial career
- 2023–2025: Viborg
- 2025–: AGF
- * Club domestic league appearances and goals

Jakob Bendix Uhd Poulsen (born 7 July 1983) is a Danish former professional footballer who played as a midfielder and current head coach of Danish Superliga club AGF.

Poulsen started his senior career with Esbjerg fB, before moving to Dutch side SC Heerenveen in 2006. He joined AGF Aarhus in the summer of 2008. His last club was Australian A-League club Melbourne Victory FC. Between 2009 and 2015 he played 35 games and scored two goals for the Denmark national team.

In late 2023, Poulsen received his first opportunity as head coach when then-manager Jacob Friis left Viborg for another position. Initially receiving the role on an interim basis, Poulsen was given the permanent head coaching position in December 2023. Poulsen left Viborg in June 2025 when he was hired to fill the vacant head coaching role at fellow Danish Superliga club AGF, with whom he won the Danish Superliga in 2026.

== Club career ==
=== Youth career and Esbjerg fB ===
As a schoolboy, Poulsen played alongside Anders Egholm and Nicolai Høgh in the Danish school tournament for Næsbjerg. When he was fourteen, Poulsen joined Esbjerg fB, and went on to progress through the youth system. He got his senior debut under coach Viggo Jensen on 9 September 2001 against Midtjylland, coming on as a 64th-minute substitute, in a 2–0 win. This turns out to be his only appearance for the club in the 2001–02 season.

At the start of the 2002–03 season, Poulsen soon received a handful of first team under the new team of coach Ove Pedersen at Esbjerg fB. He then scored his first goal of the season, in a 4–3 loss against Køge on 11 August 2002. Poulsen later scored two more goals; the first one came against Køge on 27 October 2002 and the second one came against AGF on 6 April 2003. He later helped the club avoid relegation. Despite suffering injuries throughout the 2002–03 season, Poulsen was restricted to making 21 of 33 games in the league.

At the start of the 2003–04 season, Poulsen continued to regain his first team place, playing in the midfield position. On 24 August 2003 he scored his first goal of the season, in a 3–2 win against AaB. Poulsen then scored two consecutive goals between 17 September 2003 and 20 September 2003 against Frem and Nordsjælland respectively. This led Manager Pedersen commenting about his performance, saying: "He worked really well and was lightning dangerous with his depth runs. There is no doubt that the place in the midfield in the long run is his, but he also does it excellently as a fullback." He, once again, scored two consecutive goals between 29 November 2003 and 7 December 2003 against AaB and OB respectively. On 21 March 2004 Poulsen scored twice for the side in a 3–3 draw against AGF. Two weeks later on 4 April 2004, he provided a hat–trick assists, in a 4–0 win against Nordsjælland. As the 2003–04 season progressed, Poulsen helped Esbjerg fB finish in third place, with the club being involved in a title contender spot. At the end of the season, he went on to make thirty–five appearances and scoring seven times in all competitions.

At the start of the 2004–05 season, Poulsen played in both legs of the UEFA Intertoto Cup First round against NSÍ Runavík, as Esbjerg fB won 7–1 on aggregate. He later helped the club reach the semi–finals of the tournament, only to lose 6–1 on aggregate against Schalke 04. On 28 August 2004 Poulsen scored his first goal of the season in a 7–2 win against Herfølge Boldklub. His second goal for Esbjerg fB came on 22 September 2004, in a 4–2 loss against OB. Since the start of the 2004–05 season, he continued to regain his first team place, playing in the midfield position. Poulsen later scored three more goals later in the 2004–05 season. Despite suffering injuries throughout the 2004–05 season, Poulsen went on to make forty appearances and scoring five times in all competitions.

At the start of the 2005–06 season, Poulsen started the season well for Esbjerg fB when he scored his first goal of the season, in a 2–1 loss against FC Midtjylland on 24 July 2005. Since the start of the 2005–06 season, Poulsen continued to regain his first team place, playing in the midfield position. He then played in both legs of the UEFA Cup Second round against Tromsø, as the club lost 3–2 on penalties, having played 120 minutes in a 1–1 draw on aggregate. On 2 October 2005 Poulsen scored his second goal of the season in a 2–2 draw against AGF. He scored two more goals for Esbjerg fB, coming against FC København and SønderjyskE. In the first half of the season, Poulsen went on to make twenty–two appearances and scoring four times in all competitions. By the time he departed from the club, Poulsen played a total 107 games and scored 19 goals in the Superliga, before leaving Esbjerg fB in January 2006.

=== SC Heerenveen ===
On 27 January 2006, Esbjerg fB agreed to sell Poulsen to Dutch team SC Heerenveen. Later in the same day, the move was confirmed, with the player signed a three-and-a-half-year contract with the club. Upon joining Heerenveen, he was joined by Danish teammates: Hjalte Bo Nørregaard, Bo Storm, Timmi Johansen, and Ken Ilsø.

However, Poulsen's career at the club suffered a setback when he suffered an ankle injury in late–February. But Poulsen recovered and made his debut for Heerenveen, starting the whole game, in a 4–1 loss against PSV Eindhoven on 4 March 2006. Since returning from injury, he returned to the side, playing seven more matches in his first half-year with the team, including scoring his first goal for Heerenveen, as the club won 1–0 against FC Twente on 30 April 2006. At the end of the 2005–06 season, Poulsen went on to make fourteen appearances in all competitions.

At the start of the 2006–07 season, Poulsen found himself as a backup to right back Gianni Zuiverloon. This was due to that he did not like coach Gertjan Verbeek's motivational skills. As a result, Poulsen found himself placed on the substitute bench. Along the way, he also find himself with injury concerns. Poulsen was used as right midfielder in the spring 2007 but he could not establish himself in the starting line-up, mostly featuring in Heerenveen games as a substitute. Poulsen played in both legs of the newly born Eredivisie play-offs against Ajax, as the club lost 4–1 on aggregate. At the end of the 2006–07 season, he went on to make twenty–seven appearances in all competitions.

Ahead of the 2007–08 season, Poulsen faced uncertainties over his future at Heerenveen, due to lack of first team opportunities. He found his playing time at the club, mostly coming from the substitute bench in the first half of the season. On 2 December 2007 Poulsen scored his first goal for Heerenveen, in a 1–0 win against NEC Nijmegen. Two weeks later on 15 December 2007, he set up two goals for the club, in a 5–1 win against NAC Breda. Poulsen then scored two goals in two matches between 19 January 2008 and 23 January 2008 against AZ Alkmaar and VVV-Venlo respectively. A week later on 2 February 2008, he set up two goals for Heerenveen, in a 7–0 win against Vitesse. In the second half of the season, Poulsen established himself in the team, playing in the midfield position. Despite being sidelined on two more occasions later in the 2007–08 season, he went on to make thirty–five appearances and scoring three times in all competitions.

Ahead of the 2008–09 season, under the new management of Trond Sollied, Poulsen was expected to leave Heerenveen after Sollied would not include him in more games, leading him to leave the club. On 13 August 2008 he agreed to move back to Denmark by joining AGF.

=== AGF Aarhus ===
On 14 August 2008 Poulsen joined AGF on a four-year contract, where he rejoined his former coach Ove Pedersen, and looked to restart his career by receiving more regular playing time. Upon joining the club, Poulsen was presented and couldn't wait to play for the team.

He made his debut for AGF Aarhus, starting the whole game, in a 2–1 win against Brøndby on 17 August 2008. Since joining the club, Poulsen established himself in the starting eleven, playing in the midfield position. On 13 September 2008 he scored his first goal for AGF Aarhus, in a 2–0 win against AaB. His goal against AaB was later earned an award for September's of the month in a TV 2 Sport poll. On 1 December 2008 Poulsen scored his second goal for the club in a 2–1 win against Odense BK. By April, he began to play an important role for AGF by setting up two goals in two matches between 19 April 2009 and 22 April 2009 against Copenhagen and SønderjyskE. This was followed up by four goals in the next four matches, coming against Nordsjælland, Odense BK, AaB and Esbjerg. His contributions and performance in the club's first team was praised by new Manager Erik Rasmussen. At the end of the 2008–09 season, as AGF finished the 2008–09 Danish Superliga season in sixth place, Poulsen went on to make thirty–one appearances and scoring six times in all competitions. For his performance, he was included in the team of the fall season by both TV 2 Sport and TV 3. Poulsen was also named 2009 Danish Superliga Player of the Year.

Ahead of the 2009–10 season, Poulsen was linked a move away from AGF, with clubs from Europe wanted to sign him. But he ended up staying at the club, having stated his intention to do so. At the start of the 2009–10 season, Poulsen continued to regain his first team place, playing in the midfield position. In early–August, he was involved in alteration with teammate Nando Rafael during training and this was quickly solved by Manager Rasmussen. Shortly after, Poulsen scored two goals in two matches between 3 August 2009 and 9 August 2009 against Odense BK and Køge respectively. This was followed up by setting up two goals in the next two matches. A month later on 28 September 2009, he scored his third goal of the season, as well as, setting up one of AGF's goals, in a 3–2 loss against Esbjerg. The first half of the season saw Poulsen being named the SAS league's Best Eleven in the first half of the season. In the January transfer window, he continued to be linked a move away from the club. A transfer offer from Serie A side Lazio was accepted by AGF in January 2010, but Poulsen rejected the offer in order not to put his 2010 FIFA World Cup participation in jeopardy. By February, however, he suffered ankle injury while on international duty and was sidelined for a month. On 18 April 2010 Poulsen returned to the first team, coming on as a 63rd-minute substitute in a 1–0 loss against Brøndby. Two weeks later on 1 May 2010, he scored his fourth goal of the season, as well as, setting up the club's fourth goal of the game, in a 4–1 win against Silkeborg. Having started the season well, AGF were later relegated to the Danish 1st Division. At the end of the 2009–10 season, Poulsen went on to make twenty–five appearances and scoring four times in all competitions.

Following the conclusion of the FIFA World Cup 2010, Poulsen's performance in the tournament attracted interests, from European clubs, such, Wigan Athletic, 1. FC Köln, Brøndby, Randers and even his former club, Esbjerg fB, were reportedly interested in Poulsen's services. Also interested were Serie A side Lazio. Amid the transfer speculation, he made his only appearance for AGF of the season, coming on against Vejle on 8 August 2010 and missed the last minutes penalty, in a 0–0 draw. On 15 August 2010, AGF accepted a bid for Poulsen from an undisclosed club.

=== FC Midtjylland (first stint) ===
On 17 August 2010 Poulsen joined Danish Superliga side FC Midtjylland. Upon joining the club, he hoped the move to FC Midtjylland would help him earn more international call–up for the national team.

However, Poulsen suffered a serious ankle injury that saw him sidelined for two months. He was then featured in the club's reserve team on 17 November 2010 against AaB, playing 70 minutes, as they lost 2–1. Five days later on 22 November 2010, Poulsen made his debut for FC Midtjylland, coming on as an 81st-minute substitute, in a 3–2 loss against OB. On 6 March 2011 he scored his first goal for the club in a 2–0 win over Copenhagen. Following this, Poulsen received a handful of first team football for the rest of the season. Poulsen helped FC Midtjylland reach the Danish Cup Final after he scored the winning penalty in the shootout against Esbjerg following a 3–3 draw on aggregate in both legs. Poulsen then started in the Danish Cup Final against FC Nordsjælland, as the club lost 3–2. On 25 May 2011 he scored his second goal for FC Midtjylland in a 2–2 draw against Randers. At the end of the 2010–11 season, Poulsen went on to make twenty appearances and scoring two times in all competitions.

In the opening game of the 2011–12 season, Poulsen scored his first goal of the season for FC Midtjylland, in a 2–1 loss against Silkeborg. After missing one match due to ankle injury he sustained while on international duty, Poulsen returned to the starting line–up against Nordsjælland, as the club won 2–1 on 21 August 2011. This was followed up by scoring his second goal of the season, in a 2–1 win against Brøndby. Since the start of the 2011–12 season, he continued to establish himself, playing in the midfield position. Poulsen later scored two more goals by the end of 2011, scoring against Odense BK and Brøndby. Along the way, he captained for FC Midtjylland in a number of matches. However, Poulsen suffered a groin injury that saw him miss two matches. On 18 March 2012 he returned to the starting line–up as captain against Copenhagen, as the club drew 0–0. Poulsen then scored two consecutive goals in two matches between 8 April 2012 and 14 April 2012 against FC Nordsjælland and Odense BK respectively. His seventh goal of the season came on 7 May 2012, in a 1–1 draw against SønderjyskE. He later helped FC Midtjylland finish third place in the league. At the end of the 2011–12 season, Poulsen went on to make thirty–five appearances and scoring seven times in all competitions.

=== Monaco ===
Following the conclusion of the UEFA Euro 2012 tournament, it was announced on 23 June 2012 that Poulsen had joined Ligue 2 side AS Monaco for around 10 million Danish kroner (£900,000), becoming Claudio Ranieri's second signing for the club. He previously stated his desire to play abroad once again and FC Midtjylland desire to sell him. However, Manager Morten Olsen warned the player on joining AS Monaco, due to the club playing in Ligue 2 at the time.

In the opening game of the season, he made his AS Monaco debut in a 4–0 win over Tours, after coming on as a substitute, just ten minutes from full-time On 28 August 2012 Poulsen scored his first goal for the club in the second round of Coupe de la Ligue against Niort, which turned out to be a winning goal. Since joining AS Monaco, he found himself in and out of the starting eleven as part of Claudio Ranieri's rotational system. However, in the second half of the season, new signings led Poulsen to lose his place in the club's first team and was demoted to the reserve team for the remainder of the season. Despite this, his contributions at AS Monaco resulted in the club's promotion back to Ligue 1 after two-year absence. At the end of the 2012–13 season, he went on to make twenty appearances and scoring in all competitions.

Ahead of the 2013–14 season, Poulsen was keen to play alongside new signing Radamel Falcao and was expected to stay at AS Monaco to fight for his first team place. However, he lost his first team place and continued to be sidelined throughout the half of the season. Poulsen's only appearances for the club came on 30 October 2013 against Stade Reims, as AS Monaco lost 1–0 in the third round of the Coupe de la Ligue. In the January transfer window, he was told by the club that he can leave AS Monaco but only for the right price.

=== FC Midtjylland (second stint) ===
It was reported on 20 January 2014 that Poulsen agreed to return to Denmark by re–signing for his former team Midtjylland. The move was confirmed on 24 January 2014 with the player re-joining the club on a four–year contract, keeping him until 2018.

He made his second debut for the club against Odense BK on 22 February 2014, starting the whole game, losing 2–1. This was followed up by scoring his first goal for FC Midtjylland in two years, in a 5–1 win against Copenhagen. Since joining the club, Poulsen quickly established himself in the starting line–up, playing in the midfield position. He then captained FC Midtjylland for the first time in two years, in a 2–0 loss against Odense BK on 12 April 2014. A month later on 4 May 2014, Poulsen scored his second goal for the club, in a 3–1 win against Vestsjælland. At the end of the 2013–14 season, he went on to make fifteen appearances and scoring two times in all competitions.

At the start of the 2014–15 season, Poulsen continued to establish himself in the first team, playing in the midfield position and his contributions to FC Midtjylland saw the club go on a winning start, resulting in them becoming title contenders. Along the way, he captained a number of matches for FC Midtjylland in the absence of Kristian Bach Bak. Poulsen also began to contribute a number of assists throughout the 2014–15 season; including three consecutive separate times. On 3 October 2014 he scored his first goal of the season, as well as setting up two goals, in a 5–1 win against Hobro. Poulsen then set up five goals in three matches between 23 February 2015 and 8 March 2015; two of them were double against Odense BK and Esbjerg respectively. This was followed up by scoring his second goal of the season, in a 2–1 win against Randers. Poulsen then scored twice for the club, in a 2–1 win against AaB on 12 April 2015. He later helped FC Midtjylland win the league after drawing 0–0 draw against Vestsjælland on 21 May 2015. Despite missing two matches due to injury during the 2014–15 season, Poulsen went on to make thirty–three appearances and scoring four times in all competitions.

At the start of the 2015–16 season, Poulsen continued to establish himself in the starting eleven, playing in the midfield position. He was involved in the FC Midtjylland's matches in the UEFA Champions League's qualifying round; assisting a goal in both legs against Lincoln Red Imps and APOEL (and also scored his first goal of the season), who they eliminated in the third round. Poulsen helped FC Midtjylland qualify for the UEFA Europa League Group Stage after helping the club beat Southampton 2–1 on aggregate. On 25 October 2015 he scored his first goal of the season in a 2–1 loss against Brøndby. Two weeks later on 8 November 2015, Poulsen scored his second goal of the season, as well as, setting up one of the club's goals, in a 5–1 win against Esbjerg. In a continuous absence of Kristian Bach Bak, he captained FC Midtjylland throughout the 2015–16 season. Poulsen later scored four more goals later in the 2015–16 season, including a brace against FC Copenhagen on 1 May 2016. However, the club failed to defend the league title after they ended up finishing third place in the league. Despite being absent on three occasions during the 2015–16 season, he went on to make forty–six appearances and scoring seven times in all competitions.

Ahead of the 2016–17 season, Poulsen was appointed as FC Midtjylland's captain permanently following the retirement of Kristian Bach Bak. He helped the club make a good start in the UEFA Europa League Qualifying Round Matches against FK Sūduva and FC Vaduz. However, in the second leg against Vaduz, Poulsen was sent–off in the 45th minute after a collision with an opponent, in a 2–2 draw, resulting in FC Midtylland going through. As a result, he served a two match suspension in the UEFA Europa League. Poulsen made a good start in the first five league matches when he contributed a brace assists against Silkeborg on 31 July 2016 and scored four times, including a brace against Brøndby. Throughout the 2016–17 season, he continued remain involved in the first team and helped the club maintain their top position in the league. Poulsen later scored three more goals later in the season, coming against Esbjerg fB, Lyngby and Brøndby. He later helped FC Midtylland beat Randers 3–0 on 1 June 2017 to help the club qualify for UEFA Europa League next season. At the end of the 2016–17 season, Poulsen went on to make forty–five appearances and scoring seven times in all competitions.

At the start of the 2017–18 season, Poulsen made a good start for FC Midtylland when he scored his first goal of the season, as well as, setting up of the club's goals, in a 6–1 win against Derry City. In the return leg, he set up one of the goals, as FC Midtylland beat Derry City 4–1 to advance to the next round. Poulsen followed up by scoring a hat–trick against Ferencvárosi and set up one of the club's goals, as FC Midtylland won 4–2. In the return leg, he, once again, set up one of the goals for FC Midtylland, as the club won 3–1 to advance to the next round. Poulsen then scored three consecutive goals in three matches between 17 September 2017 and 1 October 2017 against Hobro, AGF and AaB. It was announced on 3 November 2017 that he signed a contract extension with FC Midtylland, keeping him until 2019. Poulsen provided a hat–trick assist against AGF on 27 November 2017, as the club won 4–0. This was followed up by scoring his eighth goal of the season, in a 3–1 win against Odense BK. Poulsen, once again, provided a double assist against Silkeborg on 5 March 2018, as FC Midtylland won 2–1. This was followed up by scoring his ninth goal of the season, in a 1–1 win against Nordsjælland. Throughout the 2017–18 season, he continued remain involved in the first team and helped the club maintain their top position in the league. Poulsen also began to contribute a number of assists throughout the 2017–18 season with a total of 28 times. He later scored three more goals later in the 2017–18 season, coming against Nordsjælland and AaB (twice in two separate matches). In the last game of the season, Poulsen, under his leadership, helped FC Midtylland win the league for the second time in his career after beating AC Horsens 1–0. At the end of the 2017–18 season, he went on to make forty–seven appearances and scoring twelve times in all competitions. For his performance, Poulsen was named on the Superligaen Team of the Year by newspaper B.T..

At the start of the 2018–19 season, Poulsen continued remain involved in the first team and helped FC Midtylland maintain their top position in the league. On 28 July 2018 he scored his first goal of the season, as well as setting up one of the club's goals, in a 3–1 win against Esbjerg fB. This was followed up by setting up a brace against Vejle and scoring his second goal of the season, in a 3–0 win against AC Horsens. Poulsen later added three more goals by the end of the year, scoring against FC Copenhagen, Vejle and Odense BK. With his contract at FC Midtylland expiring at the end of the 2018–19 season, he signed a contract extension with the club on 7 February 2019. Poulsen helped FC Midtylland reach the final of the Danish Cup by setting one of the club's goals to beat Odense BK 4–0 on 3 April 2019. This was followed up by scoring two goals in the next two matches against Esbjerg and Odense BK. However, FC Midtylland failed to defend the league title after surrendering their lead to FC Copenhagen, as he helped the club finish second place in the league. In the final of the Danish Cup against Brøndby, Poulsen started the whole 120 minutes game, resulting in the penalty–shootout after a 1–1 draw, and scored the first penalty kick, as FC Midtylland won the tournament following a 4–3 win in the penalty–shootout. At the end of the 2018–19 season, he went on to make forty–five appearances and scoring seven times in all competitions.

However at the start of the 2019–20 season, Poulsen found his first team opportunities at FC Midtylland limited following the new management of Kenneth Andersen and Brian Priske. His only appearance for the club this season came on 21 July 2019 against Nordsjælland, coming on in the 72nd minute, in a 2–1 win. As a result, he wanted to leave FC Midtjylland to pursue first team football. It was announced on 31 August 2019 that Poulsen had left the club, ending his five years association with FC Midtjylland. By the time he left the club, Poulsen made 286 appearances and scoring 48 times in two separate spells at FC Midtjylland.

=== Melbourne Victory ===
On 2 September 2019, Australian club Melbourne Victory announced signing Poulsen on a one-year contract.

He made his debut for the club in the Melbourne Derby against Melbourne City on 12 October 2019, starting a match and played 86 minutes before being substituted, in an eventual 0–0 draw. Since joining Melbourne Victory, Poulsen found himself in a first team in a number of matches, playing in the midfield position. However, his performance in a number of matches received criticism from the Australian media. Despite this, Poulsen then contributed two assists for the club, first coming against Western United on 8 December 2019 and then against Central Coast Mariners on 12 January 2020. This lasted until the 2019–20 season was suspended due to the COVID-19 pandemic. By the time the season was suspended, Poulsen made seventeen appearances in all competitions.

Having been told by the club that he can leave earlier this year, Poulsen left Melbourne Victory with his contract expecting to expire at the end of the 2019–20 season. Around the same time, he announced his retirement from professional football and returned to Denmark to be with his family, having previously intended to do so.

== International career ==
=== Youth and Denmark League XI ===
Having represented five times for Denmark U19 (in which Poulsen made his debut in September 2000) and seven times for the Denmark U20 (in which he made his debut in July 2002), Poulsen was called up to the Denmark U21 for the first time in November 2003. He made his national side U21 debut, coming on as a substitute to replace right back Allan Olesen, in a 0–0 draw against Italy U21 on 19 November 2003.

For the next three years, playing for Denmark U21, Poulsen played in different positions for the team. He then played a total 16 games for the under-21s until January 2006, scoring one goal in the 2006 UEFA European Under-21 Football Championship qualification. In May 2006, Poulsen was included in the Denmark U21 squad for the UEFA European Under-21 Football Championship, but did not play any games at the tournament, as the U21 side were eliminated in the group stage.

After strong performances for AGF, Poulsen was called up by national team coach Morten Olsen for the Denmark League XI national football team in January 2009, becoming the first player to be called up from the club in twelve years. He impressed in January 2009, and Olsen saw him as a competitor with Lars Jacobsen and Kasper Bøgelund for the right back position, while Poulsen maintained he saw himself as a right midfielder. Poulsen was also a part of the League XI in January 2010.

=== Senior career ===
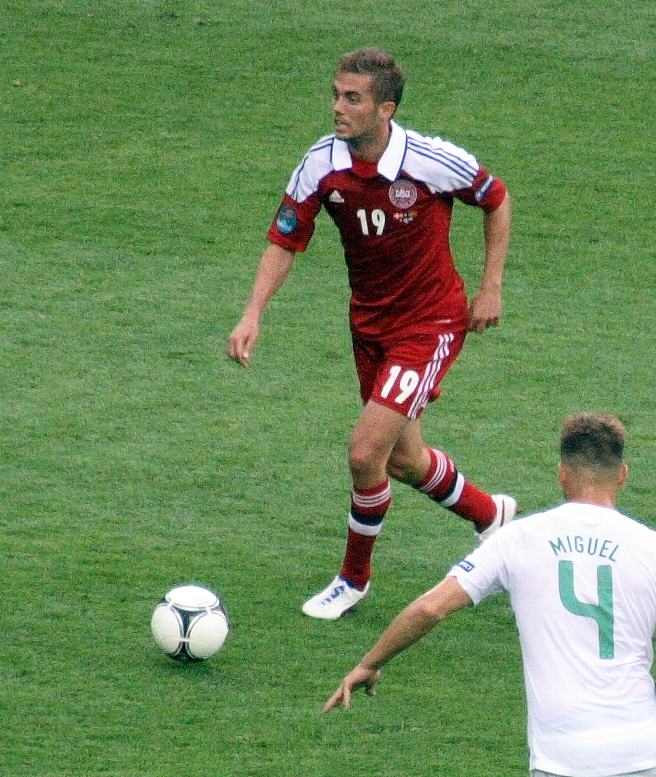
Poulsen in 2012

In February 2009, Poulsen was called up for the Denmark national team for the first time in his career. He made his senior international debut in a friendly match against Greece, coming on as a substitute for Lars Jacobsen, as the national side drew 1–1 on 11 February 2009. A month later, Poulsen was called up to the Denmark squad once again. In the 2010 FIFA World Cup qualification game against Albania in April 2009, Poulsen replaced Martin Jørgensen in the midfield, making his second appearances for the national side, in a 3–0 win. Following this, he went on to secure himself a place in the starting line-up, as a central midfielder. In his seventh national team game, Poulsen scored his first international goal in the 1–0 win against Sweden on 10 October 2009, which secured the qualification for Denmark. Later in the same year, he was one of five nominees for the 2009 Danish Footballer of the Year award, which eventually went to Nicklas Bendtner. On 28 May 2010, Denmark coach Morten Olsen announced that Poulsen would be part of the final squad of 23 participating in the FIFA World Cup in South Africa. After sitting out against Netherlands, he made his tournament debut, coming on as a substitute in Denmark 2–1 win against Cameroon. In a follow–up match against Japan in the last group match, Poulsen, once again, came on as a 34th-minute substitute, as Denmark lost 3–1, resulting in their elimination in the group stage.

Following the World Cup tournament, on 14 March 2011 Poulsen was called up to the Denmark squad after a nine months absence. He made his first appearance for the national team for the first time in nine months, coming on as a 70th-minute substitute, in a 1–1 draw against Norway on 26 March 2011. Later in the year, Poulsen helped Denmark qualify for the UEFA Euro 2012 after coming on as a late substitute to help the national side beat 2–1 Portugal on 11 October 2011. In May 2012, he was inducted in the final squad for Euro 2012. Poulsen appeared twice in the starting line–up against Portugal and Germany, as they were eliminated in the group stage.

Following the end of the UEFA Euro 2012 tournament, Poulsen made three more appearances for the national side by the end of the year. After a one-and-a-half-year absence, it was not until 3 March 2014 that he was called up to the Denmark squad. Poulsen made his first appearance for the national team for the first time in a year and a half, starting a match, as Denmark lost 1–0 against England on 5 March 2014. Following this, he made one more appearance for the national team for the rest of the year, coming against Hungary on 22 May 2014, as Denmark drew 2–2. On 17 March 2015 Poulsen was called up to the Denmark squad. He made his first appearance for the national team in over a year, as Denmark beat United States 3–2 on 22 March 2015. Three months later on 13 June 2015, Poulsen scored his second goal for the national team, in a 2–0 win against Serbia. He later appeared three more times for Denmark by the end of the year. However, in the UEFA Euro 2016 qualifying play-offs against Sweden, Poulsen appeared as an unused substitute in both legs, Denmark failed to qualify for the UEFA Euro 2016 following a 4–3 defeat on aggregate.

Following this, Poulsen was out of the national team for two years. In May 2018, it was reported that he could be included in the Denmark squad for the FIFA World Cup in Russia. However, Poulsen did not make the cut.

== Style of play ==
Poulsen has been described as a good set-piece taker, as well as possessing a great passing range and good technical ability. Capable of playing as a fullback in addition to his usual central midfield role, during his second stint with Midtjylland, Poulsen played as one of two central midfielders in either a 3-4-3 or a 4-3-3 formation as a Pirlo-esque number 6. He said playing in the central–midfield position was his favourite, citing in his opinion passing opportunities.

In June 2009, Bold.dk named Poulsen as the league's best player with the most passes throughout the 2008–09 season. Two months later, Jesper Bech called him the league's best technician, due to his skills and display. He was described as playing a critical role in helping Midtjylland to win the Danish league title in the 2017–18 season.

== Coaching career ==
=== Viborg ===
On 15 March 2021, Poulsen was hired as an assistant coach to Lars Friis at Danish 1st Division club Viborg FF.

Poulsen was named as the interim manager for Viborg on 3 November 2023, as the club were negotiating the sale of Jacob Friis to German club FC Augsburg. With Viborg in 9th place at the time of his appointment, his first match in charge came two days later on 5 November, a 2–1 victory over Silkeborg. He was appointed as permanent head coach on 19 December 2023 after four matches in charge, with two wins and two losses. Viborg would finish the season in 8th place as they lost three of their final four matches of the season, narrowly missing out on a European play-off match behind Randers.

Poulsen's second season in charge started off slow, as Viborg failed to win any of their opening five Superliga matches and sitting just above the relegation zone. They would win three of the following four matches, including a 5–0 away victory over then-winless Vejle. By the winter break, Viborg sat in 8th position where they would largely remain for the season. Despite an underwhelming league campaign, the team performed well as they pushed into the semi-finals of the Danish Cup with a 7–1 aggregate scoreline over 3rd Division side Brabrand. With the league split and falling into the relegation round, Viborg finished the season strong with only one loss in their final 10 games. However, with a series of draws and a loss to Vejle, they finished two points behind Silkeborg for a European play-off spot. Viborg's run in the Danish Cup also came to an end with consecutive 0–1 losses to Copenhagen, resulting in a 0–2 aggregate scoreline.

=== AGF ===
Prior to the 2025–26 Danish Superliga season, AGF announced they had signed Poulsen from Viborg, to replace the fired Uwe Rösler. One month later on 20 July, he made his official debut as head coach in a 1–1 draw against Sønderjyske. After struggling in their opening fixtures, he earned his first win with the club on 8 August, defeating Copenhagen 3–2 at Parken Stadium. After round 18, when the Superliga entered into a two-month break for the winter, Poulsen and AGF sat in 1st place in the league. Four points ahead of second place Midtjylland, the team had secured their place going into the championship round of the 2025–26 season. On 10 May 2026, AGF and Poulsen achieved the club's first Danish championship since 1986, following a 2–0 away win over Brøndby.

== Personal life ==
His father, Steffen Poulsen, worked at the West Jutland football. Poulsen is married to his wife, Nina, and together, they have a daughter, who was born in 2015.

Poulsen's performance and goal in a 1–0 win over Sweden generated media attention in Denmark when he became the most searched name on the internet.

== Career statistics ==
=== International ===
Appearances and goals by national team and year
National team	Year	Apps	Goals
Denmark	2009	10	1
Denmark	2010	5	0
Denmark	2011	4	0
Denmark	2012	9	0
Denmark	2014	2	0
Denmark	2015	5	1
Total		35	2

Scores and results list Denmark's goal tally first, score column indicates score after each Poulsen goal.

List of international goals scored by Jakob Poulsen
No.	Date	Venue	Opponent	Score	Result	Competition
1	10 October 2009	Parken Stadium, Copenhagen, Denmark	Sweden	1–0	1–0	2010 FIFA World Cup qualification
2	13 June 2015	Parken Stadium, Copenhagen, Denmark	Serbia	2–0	2–0	UEFA Euro 2016 qualifying

=== Managerial ===
As of match played 20 November 2026

Managerial record by team and tenure
Team	From	To	Record					Ref
Team	From	To	G	W	D	L	Win %	Ref
Viborg (interim)	5 November 2023	18 December 2023	4	2	0	2	50.0	
Viborg	19 December 2023	20 June 2025	54	22	15	17	40.7	
AGF	20 June 2025	present	64	29	19	16	45.3	
Career total			122	53	34	35	43.4	

== Honours ==
=== As player ===
Monaco

- Ligue 2: 2012–13

Midtjylland

- Danish Superliga: 2014–15, 2017–18
- Danish Cup: 2018–19

Individual

- Danish Superliga Player of the Year: 2008–09

=== As manager ===
AGF

- Danish Superliga: 2025–26

Individual

- Danish Football Manager of the Year: 2026

Sporting positions
Preceded by Kristian Bach Bak	FC Midtjylland captain 2016–2019	Succeeded by Erik Sviatchenko
