= 2011 Danish Cup final =

- Event: 2010–11 Danish Cup
FC Nordsjælland	FC Midtjylland
3	2
- Date: 22 May 2011
- Venue: Parken, Copenhagen
- Man of the Match: Mikkel Thygesen
- Referee: Claus Bo Larsen
- Attendance: 8,863
- Weather: Rainy, 14 °C (57 °F)

The 2011 Danish Cup final was a football match that decided the winner of the 2010–11 Danish Cup. It was played on 22 May 2011 at 18:45 CEST, between FC Nordsjælland and FC Midtjylland, the same two teams who competed in last year's final, with FC Nordsjælland emerging victorious once again, 3–2.

== Route to the final ==
As both teams had finished between 5th and 10th in the previous season's Superliga, both teams entered in the second round of the competition.

FC Nordsjælland	Round	FC Midtjylland
FC Skanderborg (away); Won 3 – 1	Second round	Vanløse IF (away); Won 5 – 0
FC Hjørring (away); Won 1 – 0	Third round	Avedøre IF (away); Won 3 – 2
OB (away); Won 3 – 2	Fourth round	HB Køge (away); Won 4 – 0
AC Horsens (away); Won 1 – 0	Quarter-final	AGF (away); Won 1 – 0
Esbjerg fB; Lost first leg (at home) 1 – 2 Won second leg (away) 2 – 1 (a.e.t.); Advanced with 3 – 3 on aggregate after winning 5 – 4 on penalties	Semi-final (two legs)	Randers FC; Won first leg (at home) 1 – 0 Drew second leg (away) 0 – 0 Advanced with 1 – 0 on aggregate

== Pre-match ==
Traditionally, the Danish Cup Final is played on Ascension Day, a public holiday in Denmark, but the date 2 June was occupied by an international match. Furthermore, the new match date of 22 May, set by the Danish FA and accepted by the Superliga clubs, coincided with the 2011 Copenhagen Marathon which meant that the area surrounding Parken was closed until 15:00, forcing the later starting time of 18:00.

For the first time in Danish Cup history, the same two teams were to play the final two years in a row, Nordsjælland beat Midtjylland 2–0 after extra time in last year's final.

== Match ==
The match was originally scheduled for 18:00 CEST, but 30 minutes prior to kick-off the match was postponed 45 minutes because of a risk of lightning.

=== Match details ===
FC Nordsjælland was the designated home team for the match.

22 May 2011
18:45 CEST (UTC+02)

FC Nordsjælland	3–2	FC Midtjylland
Lawan 16', 54'; Christensen 90+2'		Thygesen 37', 72'

Parken, Copenhagen
Attendance: 8,863
Referee: Claus Bo Larsen

FC Nordsjælland	FC Midtjylland

FC NORDSJÆLLAND (4–2–3–1):
GK	1	(Denmark) Jesper Hansen
RB	4	(Denmark) Henrik Kildentoft
CB	31	(Denmark) Jores Okore
CB	5	(Denmark) Andreas Bjelland
LB	14	(Costa Rica) Bryan Oviedo
DM	18	(United States) Michael Parkhurst
DM	6	(Ghana) Enoch Kofi Adu		(substituted off) 53'
RW	22	(Denmark) Andreas Laudrup		(substituted off) 61'
AM	7	(Denmark) Nicolai Stokholm	(yellow card) 12'
LW	9	(Denmark) Tobias Mikkelsen		(substituted off) 79'
CF	9	(Sweden) Rawez Lawan
Substitutions:
	20	(Denmark) Matti Lund Nielsen		(substituted on) 53'
	23	(Denmark) Morten Nordstrand		(substituted on) 61'
	15	(Denmark) Søren Christensen		(substituted on) 79'
Manager:
(Denmark) Morten Wieghorst

FC MIDTJYLLAND (4–4–2):
GK	1	(Denmark) Jonas Lössl
RB	21	(Denmark) Kasper Hansen
CB	32	(Denmark) Kristian Bak Nielsen	(yellow card) 28'
CB	20	(Croatia) Kristijan Ipsa
LB	6	(Denmark) Jesper Juelsgård
RM	11	(Denmark) Danny Olsen		(substituted off) 67'
CM	9	(Denmark) Jakob Poulsen
CM	43	(Nigeria) Izunna Uzochukwu
LM	36	(Nigeria) Rilwan Hassan		(substituted off) 90+2'
CF	10	(Denmark) Mikkel Thygesen
CF	44	(Nigeria) Sylvester Igboun	(yellow card) 14'
Substitutions:
	24	(Sweden) Ken Fagerberg	(yellow card) 90+5'	(substituted on) 67'
	8	(Denmark) Jonas Borring		(substituted on) 90+2'
Manager:
(Denmark) Glen Riddersholm

Man of the Match (Pokalfighter):
Mikkel Thygesen (FC Midtjylland)

Assistant referees:
Niels Høg
David Vang Andersen
Fourth official:
Kenn Hansen

Match rules:

- 90 minutes
- 30 minutes of extra time if scores level
- Penalty shoot-out if scores still level
- 7 substitutes named, of which three may be used

=== Statistics ===
Overall

	FCN	FCM
Goals scored	3	2
Corner kicks	2	7
Fouls committed	6	14
Offsides	3	2
Yellow cards	1	3
Red cards	0	0
