= Rasmus Minor Petersen =

Danish footballer (born 1988)

Rasmus Minor
Personal information
- Full name: Rasmus Minor Petersen
- Date of birth: 13 September 1988 (age 38)
- Place of birth: Svendborg, Denmark
- Height: 1.98 m (6 ft 6 in)
- Position: Defender

Youth career
- OB

Senior career*
Years	Team	Apps	(Gls)
2008–2010	LFA	13	(0)
2010–2013	Brønshøj	65	(2)
2013–2015	Lyngby	32	(1)
2015–2017	Helsingør	63	(1)
2017–2020	Hobro	96	(3)
2020	Odd	0	(0)
2021–2022	Sundby		

Managerial career
- 2023–2024: Hillerød (assistant)
- * Club domestic league appearances and goals

Rasmus Minor Petersen (born 13 September 1988) is a Danish retired professional footballer.

== Career ==
Minor Petersen progressed through the Odense Boldklub (OB) youth academy. Before the start of the 2008–09 Danish 1st Division season, he moved to Lolland Falster Alliancen (LFA), where he made his senior debut on 27 August 2008, coming on as a substitute Jesper Münsberg in a 1–2 to Herfølge. The club subsequently suffered relegation to the third-tier 2nd Division at the end of that same season.

He was signed by Brønshøj Boldklub in 2010, making his debut on 15 August, when he replaced Michael Edvold Sørensen in a 3–1 defeat away against AGF. On 11 May 2013, he scored his first league goal, in the 1–1 home draw against AB.

On 10 June 2013, Minor Petersen was officially signed by Lyngby, who tied him to the club on a two-year contract. On 25 July, he made his first appearance for the club, playing in the starting lineup in a 2–0 defeat to HB Køge.

In 2015, he signed with FC Helsingør, in the second tier 1st Division. On 26 July, he played his first team match for the club, in the 3–0 defeat against FC Roskilde. On 2 April 2017, he scored his first goal for the club, contributing to the 1–2 victory for Fremad Amager.

On 13 June 2017, Hobro IK announced that they had signed Minor Petersen, who joined the club on a three-year contract. On 16 July, he made his Danish Superliga debut, when he was in the starting lineup in a 2–1 win over Helsingør. On 3 December, he scored his first goal in the highest tier, in the 1–1 home draw against AC Horsens. Due to the effects of the COVID-19 pandemic, the 2019–20 Superliga – like many other leagues – suffered an initial suspension and later a calendar shift. Therefore, on 7 June 2020, Minor Petersen's contract was extended by one month beyond its natural expiration date. On 5 August 2020, Minor Petersen left the club.

On 10 October 2020, free from contractual obligations, he signed an agreement valid until the end of the season with the Norwegians club Odds BK. However, on 24 November, one month after arriving and without having made an official appearance, Minor Petersen left the club for personal reasons.

On 27 January 2021, 32-year old Minor announced his retirement. However, he continued to play on amateur level for Sundby Boldklub.

At the end of December 2022, it was confirmed that Minor, as of the new year, had been hired as an assistant coach at Danish 1st Division club Hillerød Fodbold under head coach Christian Lønstrup, who was also Minor's coach when he played for FC Helsingør. In early June 2024, Hillerød confirmed that Minor resigned as assistant coach at the club as he could no longer combine his civilian life with the job.
