= Jacob Friis =

Danish footballer and manager (born 1976)

Personal information
- Full name: Jacob Fischer Friis
- Date of birth: 11 December 1976 (age 49)
- Place of birth: Aalborg, Denmark

Team information
- Current team: Finland (manager)

Senior career*
Years	Team	Apps	(Gls)
1999–2001	Aalborg Chang		
2001–2003	AaB		

Managerial career
- 2008–2015: AaB U19
- 2018–2020: AaB
- 2021–2022: Denmark U19 women
- 2022–2023: Viborg
- 2025–2026: Finland
- * Club domestic league appearances and goals

Jacob Fischer Friis (born 11 December 1976) is a Danish professional football manager and former player.

== Playing career ==
Friis was team captain of the AaB reserve team playing in the fourth tier Denmark Series before retiring due to injury in 2002–03. Beside AaB, he also played for two years for Aalborg Chang (1999–2001).

== Managerial career ==
Friis started his career as a coach in connection with a job as an assistant coach for AaB's seventh-tier Series 3 team. He then continued as an assistant coach for AaB's reserves, playing in the fourth-tier Denmark Series, where he remained until the summer of 2006.

In the summer of 2006, Friis travelled to Mexico, where he was to teach English at Instituto CEFI and coach their football team. However, the job as a football coach was not satisfactory for Friis, and instead an opportunity arose for Friis to be part of the coaching staff around Monterrey's university team, Tigres UANL.

=== AaB ===
When Allan Kuhn resigned as a result of a finding a new coaching job at Malmö FF, Friis became the new assistant coach at AaB in January 2016 under head coach Lars Søndergaard. He had already been promised a promotion to the assistant coaching position from the summer of 2016, but these plans were advanced with the premature change of head coach.

Søndergaard was dismissed in December 2016. Morten Wieghorst signed with AaB as their new head coach in early-January 2017, and Friis was appointed his main assistant with Thomas Augustinussen as second assistant. He signed an ongoing contract extension at the end of March 2018.

In the fall of 2018, AaB won just one match out of 12 possible, and Wieghorst was subsequently fired on 26 November 2018. As his interim, Friis was appointed head coach for the three remaining matches in the Danish Superliga during the fall. Friis' first match in charge resulted in a 4–1 win over Esbjerg fB on 1 December 2018. Despite AaB losing the next match 4–2 at home to AC Horsens on 9 December, Friis was still signed on a permanent deal for the remained of the 2018–19 season.

Friis stepped back from the position as head coach of AaB on 29 October 2020, for personal reasons related to his daughter fighting leukaemia. Assistant Peter Feher took over as caretaker manager with Rasmus Würtz continuing as assistant.

=== Viborg ===
On 3 February 2022, Friis was appointed head coach of Superliga club Viborg, leaving his job as coach of the Denmark women's U19 national team.

=== Augsburg ===
On 8 November 2023, Friis left Viborg to become new assistant manager of Jess Thorup at FC Augsburg in the German Bundesliga.

=== Finland national team ===
On 20 January 2025, the Football Association of Finland announced that Friis was named the new head coach of the Finland national team on a three-year contract with an option for the possible UEFA Euro 2028 final tournament. On 20 November 2026 it was announced that Friis contract will be rescinded on 31 December and he will be replaced by Mika Lehkosuo as of 1 January 2027.

== Education ==
In August 2015, Friis acquired the UEFA Pro Licence, also known as the 'P licence'; the highest coaching education. His final assignment was entitled Afslutningspil fra mellemrum - Mod etableret forsvar (Finishing from the red zone - against established defense).

== Personal life ==
Friis was born in Aalborg, Denmark, and grew up in Aalborg Øst where he attended Mellervangsskolen. While managing AaB he lived in Vodskov northeast of Aalborg with his wife, Merle, and three children.

== Career statistics ==
=== Managerial ===
As of match played 15 November 2026

Managerial record by club and tenure
Team	From	To	Record							
Team	From	To	M	W	D	L	GF	GA	GD	Win %
AaB	10 December 2018	29 October 2020	64	27	13	24	101	77	+24	42.19
Viborg	3 February 2022	8 November 2023	76	34	19	23	109	93	+16	44.74
Finland	20 January 2025	Present	20	8	3	9	32	28	+4	40.00
Total			160	69	35	56	242	198	+44	43.13

== Honours ==
Finland

- FIFA Series: 2026
