= Claus Nørgaard =

Danish football manager and coach

Personal information
- Date of birth: 17 December 1979 (age 46)
- Place of birth: Herning Municipality, Denmark
- Position: Midfielder

Team information
- Current team: Vejle (head coach)

Youth career
- –1995: Ikast FS

Senior career*
Years	Team	Apps	(Gls)
- Herning Fremad

Managerial career
- 2012: IK Skovbakken
- 2012–2013: Vejle Kolding U19
- 2016–2017: Denmark U16
- 2016–2017: Denmark U18
- 2016–2017: Denmark U20
- 2017–2018: SønderjyskE
- 2019: Esbjerg fB (caretaker)
- 2022: Denmark U18
- 2025–: Vejle
- * Club domestic league appearances and goals

Claus Nørgaard (born 17 December 1979) is a Danish professional football coach and former player, who is currently head coach of Danish Superliga club Vejle.

In a nomadic career as a head and assistant coach at domestic and international level, Nørgaard has coached several Denmark youth international teams and Superliga clubs Sønderjyske and Vejle. He served as assistant head coach of Premier League club Brentford between 2022 and 2025.

== Coaching career ==
=== Early years ===
As a youth footballer, Nørgaard grew up learning from his father Benny, who had two Danish Superliga seasons as head coach of Ikast FS in 1993–94 and 1994–95. Nørgaard followed his father to Herning Fremad, but the effects of a bicycle accident led to him quitting his playing career in order to become head coach of the club's U15 team. He moved into Vejle in 2004 and held various youth roles, which culminated in his appointment as head coach of the U17 team on 1 January 2008. In 2009, Nørgaard was appointed as a full-time national youth coach at the DBU and served in the role until 2012, when he was appointed to his first senior head coaching role at 2nd Division club IK Skovbakken on 3 January 2012. In May 2012, Nørgaard departed the club in order to join Vejle Kolding (then-the continuation of Vejle BK) as U19 head coach. In January 2013, Nørgaard was appointed to the role as assistant head coach of the first team at the club.

=== 2013–2018 ===
In June 2013, Nørgaard joined Superliga club Brøndby as one of two assistants to head coach Thomas Frank. He had previously worked under Frank at the DBU. Nørgaard remained in the role until the end of the 2015–16 season and took up the role of head coach of the Denmark U16 and U18 teams on 1 July 2016. Nørgaard's teams went undefeated during the first half of the 2016–17 season (which included two additional matches in charge of the U20 team) and he departed to take up the head coaching role of Superliga club Sønderjyske on 5 January 2017. Signing a 2 1/2-year contract, Nørgaard indicated during the first half of the 2018–19 season that he would not seek to extend it. He was sacked in December 2018.

=== 2019–2022 ===
On 18 April 2019, Nørgaard was named as assistant head coach of Superliga club Esbjerg fB. Following the sacking of head coach John Lammers on 16 September 2019, Nørgaard was named caretaker manager and presided over six matches prior to the appointment of Lars Olsen. Nørgaard was retained in his role as assistant head coach and departed the club at the end of the 2020–21 season. On 1 June 2021, Nørgaard returned to Vejle BK for the second time as head of coaching. In early September 2021, he transitioned to the role of assistant to new head coach Peter Sørensen. Nørgaard remained with the club until 31 August 2022.

=== 2022–present ===
In July 2022, Nørgaard was named as the head coach of Denmark U18 and he took up the role on 1 September 2022. He presided over five matches before moving to England to join Premier League club Brentford as assistant to head coach Thomas Frank on 5 December 2022. The appointment marked the third time he had worked as Frank's assistant. Together with first team coach Kevin O'Connor, his day-to-day role entailed focusing on the defence. He departed the club on 16 June 2025.

On 18 December 2025, Nørgaard was appointed head coach of Danish Superliga club Vejle on a 2 1/2-year contract.

== Personal life ==
Nørgaard grew up in Lind, Herning Municipality and has a bachelor's degree in sport. Taking inspiration from his father Benny, Nørgaard supplemented his part-time football coaching income by working as a teacher. He taught at Løsning School and as of January 2012, was teaching at Jelling Seminarium. As of April 2021, Nørgaard was living in Vejle.

== Managerial statistics ==
As of match played 27 August 2026

Managerial record by team and tenure
Team	From	To	Record				
Team	From	To	P	W	D	L	Win %
IK Skovbakken	4 January 2012	May 2012	15	5	1	9	33.3
Denmark U16	1 July 2016	5 January 2017	2	2	0	0	100.0
Denmark U18	1 July 2016	5 January 2017	4	1	3	0	25.0
Denmark U20	1 July 2016	5 January 2017	2	2	0	0	100.0
SønderjyskE	5 January 2017	17 December 2018	78	26	17	35	33.3
Esbjerg fB (caretaker)	16 September 2019	27 October 2019	6	2	1	3	33.3
Denmark U18	1 September 2022	5 December 2022	5	3	1	1	60.0
Vejle	18 December 2025	Present	11	3	4	4	27.3
Total			123	44	27	52	35.8
