= Kenneth Andersen =

Danish football manager

Personal information
- Date of birth: 23 October 1967 (age 59)
- Place of birth: Stenstrup, Denmark

Team information
- Current team: Midtjylland (transition coach)

Managerial career
- Years: Team
- 2001–2004: Billund IF
- 2005–2018: Midtjylland (academy)
- 2018–2019: Midtjylland
- 2019–2023: Midtjylland (academy)
- 2026–: Midtjylland (transition coach)

Kenneth Andersen (born 23 October 1967) is a Danish football manager.

== Career ==
Andersen was the manager of various FC Midtjylland youth teams for 13 years before succeeding Jess Thorup in October 2018 as head coach of the club. From 2001 to 2004 he managed the lower league club Billund iF. On 19 August 2019 he resigned as manager of FC Midtjylland. The club also announced, that Andersen would continue at the club, working with the academy.

On 13 July 2023 it was confirmed, that Andersen had left Midtjylland in favor of partner club C.D. Mafra, where he would play a central role in strengthening the cooperation between the two clubs.

In January 2026, he returned to FC Midtjylland as a transition coach.

== Honours ==
=== Manager ===
FC Midtjylland:

- Danish Cup: 2018–19
