= Jess Thorup =

Danish football manager (born 1970)

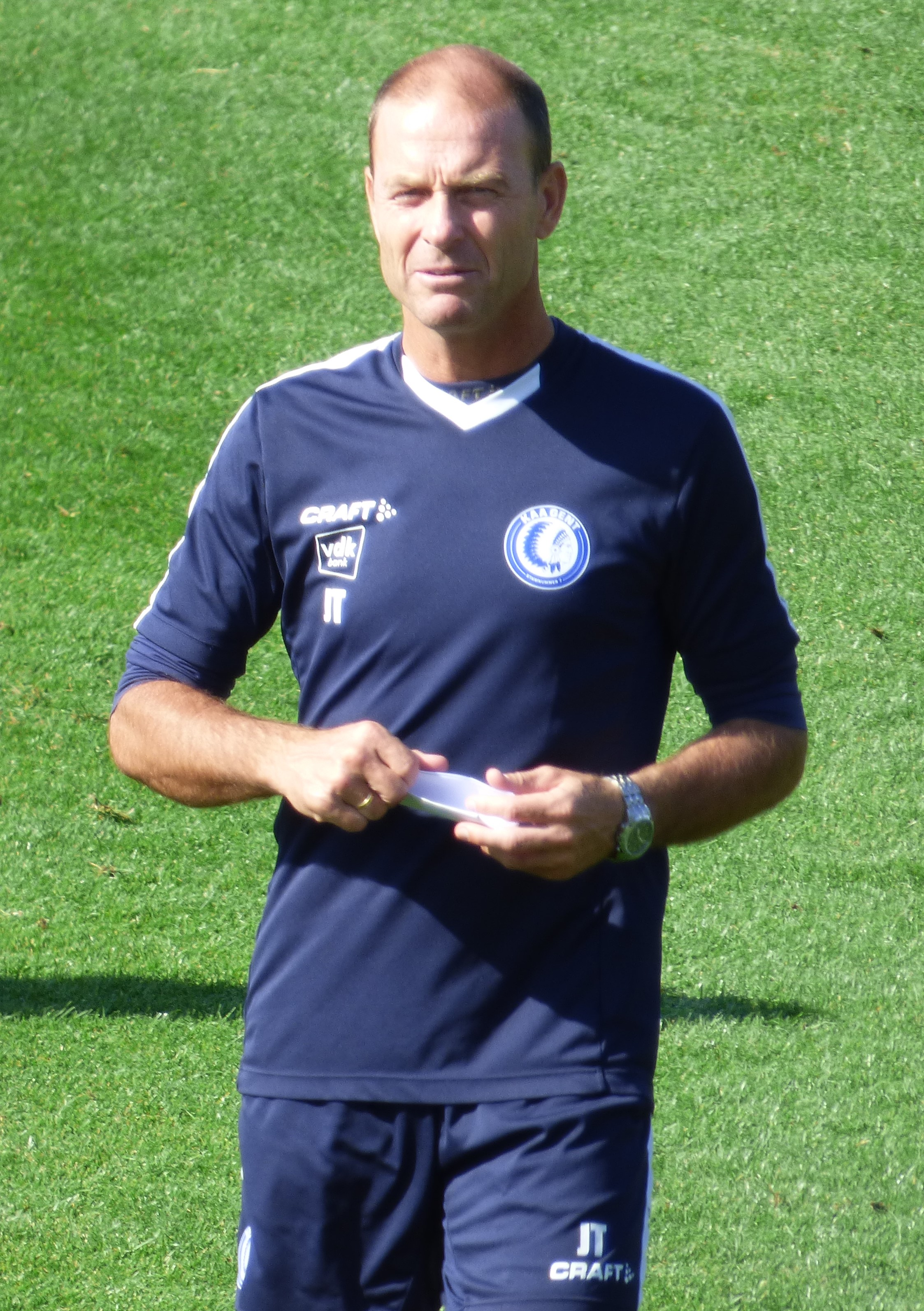
- Thorup managing Gent in 2020

Personal information
- Date of birth: 21 February 1970 (age 56)
- Place of birth: Hjerting, Denmark
- Height: 1.90 m (6 ft 3 in)
- Position: Forward

Team information
- Current team: Genk (manager)

Senior career*
Years	Team	Apps	(Gls)
1989–1996	OB	134	(29)
1996–1998	Uerdingen 05	39	(3)
1998	Tirol Innsbruck	13	(3)
1998–2005	Esbjerg fB	203	(58)
2005	HamKam	12	(1)
2006	Esbjerg fB	1	(0)
Total		390	(91)

Managerial career
- 2011–2013: Esbjerg
- 2013–2015: Denmark U20
- 2013–2015: Denmark U21
- 2015–2018: Midtjylland
- 2018–2020: Gent
- 2020: Genk
- 2020–2022: Copenhagen
- 2023–2025: FC Augsburg
- 2025–2026: Al Ahly
- 2026: Genk
- * Club domestic league appearances and goals

Jess Thorup (born 21 February 1970) is a Danish professional football manager and former player.

== Playing career ==
Thorup progressed through the youth academy of Odense (OB). He made his professional debut for the club in 1989, and won the Danish league title the same year. In both 1991 and 1993, Thorup was also part of the team winning the Danish Cup. In 1996, he moved to Germany and joined Uerdingen 05, who competed in the 2. Bundesliga. After just three goals in 39 league games, he moved to Austrian football halfway through the 1997–98 season, where he joined Tirol Innsbruck. He returned to Denmark in the summer of 1998, and played for Esbjerg fB until 2005. He then signed with HamKam in Norway, before returning to Esbjerg where he retired in 2006.

== Managerial career ==
=== Esbjerg ===
In 2006, Thorup returned to Esbjerg fB as assistant coach to Troels Bech. After the dismissal of his boss in November 2008, he took over the team as caretaker manager for three games, but then returned to the role of assistant to new head coach Ove Pedersen. After his resignation on 14 March 2011, he was promoted to head coach, but could not prevent relegation from the Danish Superliga. After achieving direct promotion the following year, the team placed themselves in middle regions of the league table and won the Danish Cup in 2012–13, beating Randers. Thorup was then voted Danish Football Manager of the Year for 2013.

=== Denmark U21 ===
On 21 February 2013 it was announced that starting 1 June 2013 he would become the manager of the Denmark under-21 national football team, thereby leaving Esbjerg fB. As the coach of the under-21 team, he took part in the 2015 UEFA European Under-21 Championship, in which the Danish team reached the semi-finals. There, they lost to eventual winners Sweden.

=== Midtjylland ===
After the European Championship, Thorup returned to club football and took over Midtjylland as the successor to Glen Riddersholm, who had resigned after winning the league title – Midtjylland's first. After they were eliminated from qualifying for the UEFA Champions League by Cypriot club APOEL, the team survived the group stage of the 2015–16 UEFA Europa League under Thorup's leadership. In the round of 16, the club caught the eye with a 2–1 first leg win over Premier League giants Manchester United, but were eliminated from the competition after a 5–1 defeat in the second leg.

=== Gent and Genk ===
On 10 October 2018, Thorup was recruited to succeed Yves Vanderhaeghe as coach of the Belgian club Gent off the back of a 5–1 home defeat to Racing Genk leaving the Buffalos seventh in the league table, one place off the title play-offs.

Under Thorup, Gent rallied to qualify for the Champions play-offs, finishing fifth, and reached the Belgian Cup Final, losing 2–1 to second-flight KV Mechelen for only the second occasion a club outside the top division had won the Cup in Belgium.

The result also denied Gent a place in Europe, with the top three in the league plus the winners of the Cup Final and the European Play-Off Final qualifying. But an investigation into events from the previous season, where Mechelen were determined to have made an attempt to fix the result of an end-of-season game against Waasland-Beveren on 11 March 2018 to try and prevent their relegation. Mechelen were allowed keep the Cup and their newly-secured top-flight status, after winning the Division 1B title in tandem with winning the Cup, but were banned from Europe for a season as part of the 2017–2019 Belgian football fraud scandal, resulting in all Belgian clubs moving up a place in terms of European qualification, with Gent next in line.

The Buffalos qualified for the UEFA Europa League, starting in the second qualifying round against Romanian club Viitorul Constanța. Through the other qualifying rounds, the club finally reached the group stage, where they won Group I with three wins and three draws. Gent took part in the round of 32, where they were eliminated by Roma.

With eleven weeks still to play in the 2019–20 season, the league was suspended due to the COVID-19 pandemic, with Gent lying second behind Club Brugge. Unlike most other major leagues, the Pro League decided against restarting the current season, announcing Club as champions, with Gent as runners-up taking a third qualifying round place for the 2020–21 UEFA Champions League.

After losing their first two games of the 2020–21 season to Sint-Truiden and Kortrijk, Thorup was suddenly dismissed as coach on 20 August 2020. By the time Thorup was hired by league rivals Genk as their new coach a month later on 24 September, his direct replacement at Gent, László Bölöni, would himself be fired after only three games in charge, with Wim De Decker taking charge, until his firing in November .

Thorup received a contract at Genk until the summer of 2023, but was at the helm for only six games before being tempted back into Danish football.

=== Copenhagen ===
In early November 2020, Thorup received an offer from Copenhagen to become their new head coach, after their former manager Ståle Solbakken had been dismissed on 10 October. At Thorup's request, his contract was terminated by Genk. Thorup signed a contract in Copenhagen until the summer of 2024.

In his first season as manager of Copenhagen he guided the club to a third place finish in the Danish Superliga. This meant that the club participated in the inaugural season of the UEFA Conference League, and Thorup led his team to the Round of 16, in which they were defeated by PSV Eindhoven.

His second season in charge of Copenhagen ended with the club being crowned as Danish champions after winning the 2021–22 Danish Superliga.

The 2022–23 Danish Superliga started poorly for the club, but they managed to qualify for the 2022–23 UEFA Champions League after defeating Trabzonspor 2–1 on aggregate. Howerver, on 20 September 2022, Copenhagen announced that the club had parted ways with Thorup as their head coach, due to the poor start to the Superliga season.

=== FC Augsburg ===
He was appointed as the new head coach of FC Augsburg on 15 October 2023. Thorup took over the club in 15th place and managed to guide them to an 11th place in his first season.

In the 2024–25 Bundesliga season, he guided the team to a 12th place. However, on 23 May 2025 he was sacked by the club citing "for the further development and direction of our club" as the reason.

=== Al Ahly ===
On 8 October 2025, Thorup was appointed head coach of Al Ahly, signing a two-and-a-half-year contract.

On 4 June 2026, Al Ahly announced Thorup's departure following a disappointing season in which the club failed to win any major trophies and did not qualify for the CAF Champions League for the first time since the 2001–02 season. During his tenure, Al Ahly were eliminated in the Round of 32 of the Egypt Cup by We SC, a team from the Egyptian Second Division A, and were knocked out of the Champions League in the quarterfinals after a 4–2 aggregate defeat to Espérance de Tunis.

=== Return to Genk ===
On 14 July 2026, it was announced that Thorup would return as manager of Belgian Pro League club Genk.

== Managerial statistics ==
As of match played 8 November 2026

Managerial record by team and tenure
Team	From	To	Record							
Team	From	To	G	W	D	L	GF	GA	GD	Win %
Esbjerg fB (caretaker)	17 November 2008	1 January 2009	3	1	2	0	4	3	+1	33.33
Esbjerg fB	14 March 2011	1 June 2013	83	45	18	20	133	77	+56	54.22
Denmark U-21	1 June 2013	12 July 2015	23	13	6	4	51	25	+26	56.52
FC Midtjylland	12 July 2015	10 October 2018	165	93	32	40	321	195	+126	56.36
Gent	10 October 2018	20 August 2020	82	39	19	24	146	102	+44	47.56
Genk	24 September 2020	2 November 2020	5	3	2	0	11	5	+6	60.00
Copenhagen	2 November 2020	20 September 2022	88	49	19	20	165	103	+62	55.68
FC Augsburg	15 October 2023	23 May 2025	65	22	18	25	84	98	−14	33.85
Al-Ahly	8 October 2025	4 June 2026	36	18	9	9	51	32	+19	50.00
Genk	14 July 2026	Present	12	5	3	4	20	15	+5	41.67
Total			561	288	128	145	986	655	+331	51.34

== Honours ==
=== Player ===
OB

- 1st Division: 1989
- Danish Cup: 1990–91, 1992–93

=== Manager ===
Esbjerg fB

- Danish 1st Division: 2011–12
- Danish Cup: 2012–13

Midtjylland

- Danish Superliga: 2017–18

Copenhagen

- Danish Superliga: 2021–22

Al Ahly

- Egyptian Super Cup: 2025
