= Glen Riddersholm =

Danish football manager (born 1972)

Personal information
- Date of birth: 24 April 1972 (age 54)
- Place of birth: Esbjerg, Denmark
- Height: 1.90 m (6 ft 3 in)

Managerial career
- Years: Team
- 1995–1999: Ikast fS (youth)
- 1999–2006: Midtjylland (youth)
- 2006–2008: Denmark U17
- 2008–2011: Midtjylland (assistant)
- 2011–2015: Midtjylland
- 2015–2017: AGF
- 2019–2021: SønderjyskE
- 2021–2022: Genk (assistant)
- 2022–2023: IFK Norrköping
- 2024–2025: Norwich City (assistant)

Glen Riddersholm (born 24 April 1972) is a Danish football manager.

== Coaching career ==
Riddersholm started as youth coach at Ikast fS and continued in this job, when the club merged with Herning Fremad to form Midtjylland.

In 2006, he replaced Hans Brun Larsen as the manager of the Danish national under-17 football team. After two years in this job he returned to Midtjylland to become assistant manager.

When Allan Kuhn resigned on 15 April 2011, Riddersholm was promoted to the position as head coach. Riddersholm led the club to its first Danish championship in the 2014–15 Danish Superliga, but shortly after he resigned as manager of the club.

On 6 December 2015, he was named successor of Morten Wieghorst as manager of AGF. He was sacked in September 2017.

In October 2018, he was named as the new director of sports of Vendsyssel FF.

On 19 December 2018, it was announced that Riddersholm would become new manager of SønderjyskE in the Danish Superliga starting on 1 February 2019. In his second season at the club he won the Danish Cup.

On 26 May 2021, it was announced that he would not be the manager of SønderjyskE going forward, as the club's owners had decided to make changes in the club's management.

In November 2021, Riddersholm was made new assistant manager of John van den Brom and later Bernd Storck at Belgian Pro League club Genk. This cooperation was ended in June 2022.

On 8 August 2022, he was hired as new manager of Swedish Allsvenskan club IFK Norrköping, succeeding the sacked Rikard Norling. Riddersholm left by mutual consent on 13 November 2023.

On 30 May 2024, he was announced as the new assistant head coach for English EFL Championship club Norwich City. He was brought in alongside new head coach Johannes Hoff Thorup. Riddersholm left his role at Norwich on 22 April 2025, after first team manager Thorup departed the club.

== Coaching record ==
As of 30 May 2024

Team	From	To	Record					
Team	From	To	M	W	D	L	Win %	Ref.
Denmark U17	2006	2008	24	8	7	9	33.33	
Midtjylland	11 April 2011	25 June 2015	160	80	34	46	50.00	
AGF	6 December 2015	30 September 2017	72	25	19	28	34.72	
SønderjyskE	1 January 2019	26 May 2021	89	35	18	36	39.33	
IFK Norrköping	8 August 2022	13 November 2023	48	18	12	18	37.50	
Total			393	166	90	137	42.24	—

== Honours ==
=== Managerial ===
==== Midtjylland ====
- Danish Superliga: 2014–15

==== SønderjyskE ====
- Danish Cup: 2019–20
