= 2014–15 FC Nantes season =

Nantes
2014–15 season
- Chairman: Waldemar Kita
- Manager: Michel Der Zakarian
- Stadium: La Beaujoire-Louis; Fonteneau
- Ligue 1: 14th
- Coupe de France: Round of 16 vs. Paris Saint-Germain
- Coupe de la Ligue: Quarter-finals vs. Lille
- Top goalscorer: League: Jordan Veretout (7); All: Jordan Veretout (7)
- Highest home attendance: 36,022 vs Marseille (18 April 2015)
- Lowest home attendance: 12,601 vs Metz (16 December 2014)
- Average home league attendance: 25,985
Home colours	Away colours	Third colours

The 2014–15 FC Nantes season was the 71st professional season of the club since its creation in 1943.

== Players ==
=== First team squad ===
French teams are limited to four players without EU citizenship. Hence, the squad list includes only the principal nationality of each player; several non-European players on the squad have dual citizenship with an EU country. Also, players from the ACP countries—countries in Africa, the Caribbean, and the Pacific that are signatories to the Cotonou Agreement—are not counted against non-EU quotas due to the Kolpak ruling.

Note: Flags indicate national team as defined under FIFA eligibility rules; some limited exceptions apply. Players may hold more than one non-FIFA nationality.

No.	Pos.	Nation	Player
1	GK	FRA	Rémy Riou
2	DF	DEN	Kian Hansen
3	DF	SEN	Papy Mison Djilobodji
4	DF	VEN	Oswaldo Vizcarrondo
5	DF	FRA	Olivier Veigneau (Captain)
6	MF	SEN	Rémi Gomis
7	MF	USA	Alejandro Bedoya
8	MF	FRA	Vincent Bessat
11	FW	GUI	Ismaël Bangoura
13	FW	TOG	Serge Gakpé
14	MF	FRA	Georges-Kévin Nkoudou
15	DF	FRA	Léo Dubois

No.	Pos.	Nation	Player
16	GK	FRA	Erwin Zelazny
18	MF	FRA	Lucas Deaux
21	FW	FRA	Johan Audel
22	DF	SEN	Issa Cissokho
23	FW	FRA	Yacine Bammou
24	DF	COM	Chaker Alhadhur
25	MF	FRA	Jordan Veretout
26	DF	CIV	Koffi Djidji
28	MF	FRA	Valentin Rongier
30	GK	FRA	Maxime Dupé
40	GK	FRA	Nassim Badri

=== Out on loan ===
Note: Flags indicate national team as defined under FIFA eligibility rules; some limited exceptions apply. Players may hold more than one non-FIFA nationality.

No.	Pos.	Nation	Player
10	FW	VEN	Fernando Aristeguieta (at Philadelphia Union)
—	MF	FRA	Amine Oudrhiri (at Arles-Avignon)

No.	Pos.	Nation	Player
—	MF	FRA	Abdoulaye Toure (at Le Poiré-sur-Vie)
—	MF	MLI	Birama Touré (at Brest)

== Competitions ==
=== Ligue 1 ===
==== League table ====
Pos	Team	Pld	W	D	L	GF	GA	GD	Pts
12	Bastia	38	12	11	15	37	46	−9	47
13	Caen	38	12	10	16	54	55	−1	46
14	Nantes	38	11	12	15	29	40	−11	45
15	Reims	38	12	8	18	47	66	−19	44
16	Lorient	38	12	7	19	44	50	−6	43

Source: Ligue 1
Rules for classification: 1) points; 2) goal difference; 3) number of goals scored

==== Results summary ====
Overall								Home						Away					
Pld	W	D	L	GF	GA	GD	Pts	W	D	L	GF	GA	GD	W	D	L	GF	GA	GD
38	11	12	15	29	40	−11	45	7	7	5	17	17	0	4	5	10	12	23	−11

Last updated: 10 June 2015.
Source: Competitive matches

==== Results by round ====
Round	1	2	3	4	5	6	7	8	9	10	11	12	13	14	15	16	17	18	19	20	21	22	23	24	25	26	27	28	29	30	31	32	33	34	35	36	37	38
Ground	H	A	H	H	A	H	A	H	A	H	A	H	A	H	A	H	A	H	A	H	A	A	H	A	H	A	H	A	H	A	H	A	H	A	H	A	H	A
Result	W	D	L	W	L	W	D	D	W	D	W	D	W	D	L	L	L	W	W	D	L	L	D	D	L	L	W	L	W	D	L	L	W	D	L	L	D	L
Position	6	5	8	7	10	7	7	9	5	6	5	6	5	4	7	7	9	8	7	7	8	9	9	9	10	11	8	11	9	9	10	11	10	10	11	12	13	14

Source: Ligue1
A = Away; H = Home; W = Win; D = Draw; L = Loss

==== Matches ====
Win Draw Loss

9 August 2014 1	Nantes	1–0	Lens	Nantes
21:00 CEST (UTC+02:00)	Bammou 65'	Report	Bourigeaud (yellow card) 69'	Stadium: Stade de la Beaujoire; Attendance: 27,964; Referee: Sébastien Desiage

16 August 2014 2	Metz	1–1	Nantes	Metz
20:00 CEST (UTC+02:00)	Ngbakoto 12' (pen.); Sarr (yellow card) 14'; Rocchi (yellow card) 32'	Report	Veretout 2'; Gakpé (yellow card) 77'	Stadium: Stade Saint-Symphorien; Attendance: 20,335; Referee: Alexandre Castro

24 August 2014 3	Nantes	0–1	Monaco	Nantes
21:00 CEST (UTC+02:00)		Report	Subašić (yellow card) 23'; Falcao 45'; Berbatov (yellow card) 89'	Stadium: Stade de la Beaujoire; Attendance: 27,042; Referee: Amaury Delerue

30 August 2014 4	Nantes	1–0	Montpellier	Nantes
20:00 CEST (UTC+02:00)	Hansen (yellow card) 2'; Gakpé (yellow card) 77', (goal) 78'	Report		Stadium: Stade de la Beaujoire; Attendance: 21,559; Referee: Frank Schneider

14 September 2014 5	Lille	2–0	Nantes	Villeneuve-d'Ascq
14:00 CEST	Martin (yellow card) 34'; Origi 46'; Lopes 49'; Sidibé (yellow card) 90'	Report	Veigneau (yellow card) 72'	Stadium: Stade Pierre-Mauroy; Attendance: 32,560; Referee: Lionel Jaffredo

20 September 2014 6	Nantes	2–1	Nice	Nantes
20:00 CEST (UTC+02:00)	Amavi 9' (o.g.); Shechter 43'	Report	Bodmer (yellow card) 24'; Amavi 70'	Stadium: Stade de la Beaujoire; Attendance: 23,240; Referee: Clément Turpin

24 September 2014 7	Bastia	0–0	Nantes	Bastia
19:00 CEST (UTC+02:00)	Peybernes (yellow card) 18'; Cahuzac (red card) 40'; Squillaci (yellow card) 48'	Report	Cissokho (yellow card) 21'; Djilobodji (yellow card) 49'	Stadium: Stade Armand Cesari; Attendance: 11,380; Referee: Tony Chapron

28 September 2014 8	Nantes	1–1	Lyon	Nantes
17:00 CEST (UTC+02:00)	Alhadhur (yellow card) 67'; Veretout 73' (pen.); Bammou (yellow card) 76'	Report	Fekir (yellow card) 37'; Koné 51'	Stadium: Stade de la Beaujoire; Attendance: 26,077; Referee: Nicolas Rainville

5 October 2014 9	Guingamp	0–1	Nantes	Guingamp
17:00 CEST (UTC+02:00)	Yatabaré (yellow card) 90+3'	Report	Nkoudou (yellow card) 17', (goal) 33'; Djilobodji (yellow card) 22'; Hansen (yellow card) 44'	Stadium: Stade du Roudourou; Attendance: 14,744; Referee: Saïd Ennjimi

18 October 2014 10	Nantes	1–1	Reims	Nantes
20:00 CEST (UTC+02:00)	Audel 13'; Veigneau (yellow card) 84'; Djilobodji (yellow card) 90+2'	Report	Oniangue (yellow card) 28'; Diego (yellow card) 43', (goal) 58'; Signorino (yellow card) 45+1'; Fofana (yellow card) 51'	Stadium: Stade de la Beaujoire; Attendance: 22,908; Referee: Sébastien Moreira

25 October 2014 11	Evian	0–2	Nantes	Annecy
20:00 CEST (UTC+02:00)	Tajeda (yellow card) 18'; Mongongu (yellow card) 42'	Report	Gomis (yellow card) 27'; Veretout 42' (pen.); Bammou (yellow card) 57', (goal) 75'	Stadium: Parc des Sports; Attendance: 10,063; Referee: Stéphane Lannoy

2 November 2014 12	Nantes	1–1	Rennes	Nantes
14:00 CET (UTC+01:00)	Armand 21' (o.g.); Hansen (yellow card) 28'; Gomis (yellow card) 64'; Vizcarrondo (yellow card) 79'	Report	Pedro Henrique 4', (yellow card) 81'; Fernandes (yellow card) 14'; Danzé (yellow card) 67'	Stadium: Stade de la Beaujoire; Attendance: 31,893; Referee: Fredy Fautrel

8 November 2014 13	Caen	1–2	Nantes	Caen
20:00 CET (UTC+01:00)	Duhamel 24'	Report	Vizcarrondo 40'; Veretout 60'; Gomis (yellow card) 67'; Riou (yellow card) 77'; Bedoya (yellow card) 90'	Stadium: Stade Michel d'Ornano; Attendance: 17,900; Referee: Tony Chapron

23 November 2014 14	Nantes	0–0	Saint-Étienne	Nantes
14:00 CET (UTC+01:00)	Shechter (yellow card) 32'; Vizcarrondo (yellow card) 53'	Report	Bayal Sall (yellow card) 4'; Tabanou (yellow card) 13'; Lemoine (yellow card) 58'	Stadium: Stade de la Beaujoire; Attendance: 32,324; Referee: Saïd Ennjimi

28 November 2014 15	Marseille	2–0	Nantes	Marseille
20:30 CET (UTC+01:00)	Thauvin 24', (yellow card) 31'; Fanni 39'	Report	Djilobodji (yellow card) 38'; Gomis (yellow card) 45'	Stadium: Stade Vélodrome; Attendance: 54,103; Referee: Ruddy Buquet

2 December 2014 16	Nantes	1–2	Toulouse	Nantes
19:00 CET (UTC+01:00)	Deaux (yellow card) 39'; Veretout 64' (pen.)	Report	Doumbia (yellow card) 20'; Sylla 24', (yellow card) 56'; Didot (yellow card) 45+1'; Braithwaite 85'	Stadium: Stade de la Beaujoire; Attendance: 19,669; Referee: Antony Gautier

6 December 2014 17	Paris Saint-Germain	2–1	Nantes	Paris
17:00 CET (UTC+01:00)	Verratti (yellow card) 11'; Ibrahimović 34', 48'	Report	Bedoya 8'; Veretout (yellow card) 44'; Djilobodji (yellow card) 58'	Stadium: Parc des Princes; Attendance: 46,161; Referee: Benoît Bastien

13 December 2014 18	Nantes	2–1	Bordeaux	Nantes
17:00 CET (UTC+01:00)	Veretout 22'; Jug 66' (o.g.); Gomis (yellow card) 83'	Report	Hansen 27' (o.g.); Saivet (yellow card) 90+2'	Stadium: Stade de la Beaujoire; Attendance: 23,751; Referee: Stéphane Lannoy

20 December 2014 19	Lorient	1–2	Nantes	Lorient
20:00 CET (UTC+01:00)	Ayew 73'	Report	Bammou 44'; Audel 78'	Stadium: Stade du Moustoir; Attendance: 15,091; Referee: Frank Schneider

11 January 2015 20	Nantes	0–0	Metz	Nantes
17:00 CET (UTC+01:00)	Bammou (yellow card) 90'	Report	Carrasso (yellow card) 72'; N'Daw (yellow card) 88'; Milán (yellow card) 90'	Stadium: Stade de la Beaujoire; Attendance: 28,090; Referee: Bartolomeu Varela

17 January 2015 21	Monaco	1–0	Nantes	Monaco
20:00 CET (UTC+01:00)	Carrasco (yellow card) 59'; Silva 73'	Report	Gakpé (yellow card) 38'	Stadium: Stade Louis II; Attendance: 5,692; Referee: Sébastien Desiage

24 January 2015 22	Montpellier	4–0	Nantes	Montpellier
20:00 CET (UTC+01:00)	Lasne 8'; Bérigaud 57'; Mounier 78'; Barrios 82'	Report	Djidji (yellow card) 48'; Veretout (yellow card) 90+3'	Stadium: Stade de la Mosson; Attendance: 11,037; Referee: Clément Turpin

31 January 2015 23	Nantes	1–1	Lille	Nantes
20:00 CET (UTC+01:00)	Veretout (yellow card) 59'; Vizcarrondo 80'	Report	Delaplace 14'; Pavard (yellow card) 56'	Stadium: Stade de la Beaujoire; Attendance: 19,252; Referee: Wilfried Bien

8 February 2015 24	Nice	0–0	Nantes	Nice
17:00 CET (UTC+01:00)	Bauthéac (yellow card) 17'; Palun (yellow card) 21'	Report	Vizcarrondo (yellow card) 45'; Alhadhur (yellow card) 72'	Stadium: Allianz Riviera; Attendance: 18,062; Referee: Tony Chapron

14 February 2015 25	Nantes	0–2	Bastia	Nantes
20:00 CET (UTC+01:00)	Djilobodji (yellow card) 36'; Aristeguieta (red card) 64'; Riou (yellow card) 67'; Deaux (yellow card) 79'	Report	Sio 30', (yellow card) 49'; Squillaci (yellow card) 35'; Ayité 75'	Stadium: Stade de la Beaujoire; Attendance: 19,789; Referee: Mikael Lesage

21 February 2015 26	Lyon	1–0	Nantes	Lyon
17:00 CET (UTC+01:00)	Ferri (yellow card) 34'; Fekir 67'; Dabo (yellow card) 80'	Report	Deaux (yellow card) 31'; Bessat (yellow card) 45'; Djilobodji (yellow card) 54'; Gakpé (yellow card) 55'; Cissokho (yellow card) 59'; Vizcarrondo (yellow card) 90+5'	Stadium: Stade de Gerland; Attendance: 36,819; Referee: Fredy Fautrel

1 March 2015 27	Nantes	1–0	Guingamp	Nantes
14:00 CET (UTC+01:00)	Deaux (yellow card) 28'; Gapké (yellow card) 30'; Djilobodji (yellow card) 32'; Vizcarrondo (yellow card) 40' (yellow-red card) 90'; Veretout (yellow card) 60'; Bammou 68'	Report	Pied (yellow card) 28'; Jacobsen (yellow card) 43'; Coco (yellow card) 53'; Sankharé (yellow card) 79'	Stadium: Stade de la Beaujoire; Attendance: 24,118; Referee: Amaury Delerue

7 March 2015 28	Reims	3–1	Nantes	Reims
20:00 CET (UTC+01:00)	Bourillon 14', (yellow card) 55'; Mandi 16'; Signorino (yellow card) 30'; Ngog 59'; Charbonnier (yellow card) 77'; Conte (yellow card) 90+1'	Report	Cissokho (yellow card) 23'; Alhadhur (red card) 44'; Bangoura (yellow card) 45+1', (goal) 77'	Stadium: Stade Auguste Delaune; Attendance: 15,261; Referee: Alexandre Castro

14 March 2015 29	Nantes	2–1	Evian	Nantes
20:00 CET (UTC+01:00)	Nkoudou 45', (yellow card) 90'; Gapké 47'; Gomis (yellow card) 87'	Report	Mensah (yellow card) 36'; Koné (yellow card) 39'; Nounkeu (yellow card) 53'; N'Sikulu 75'; Fall (yellow card) 90+3'	Stadium: Stade de la Beaujoire; Attendance: 22,047; Referee: Bartolomeu Varela

21 March 2015 30	Rennes	0–0	Nantes	Rennes
20:00 CET (UTC+01:00)		Report	Bessat (yellow card) 67'; Alhadhur (yellow card) 89'	Stadium: Stade de la Route de Lorient; Attendance: 25,140; Referee: Wilfried Bien

5 April 2015 31	Nantes	1–2	Caen	Nantes
17:00 CEST (UTC+02:00)	Bedoya 11', (yellow card) 73'	Report	Seube (yellow card) 60'; Appiah (yellow card) 62'; Sala 80' (pen.); Lemar 90+2'	Stadium: Stade de la Beaujoire; Attendance: 25,560; Referee: Benoît Millot

12 April 2015 32	Saint-Étienne	1–0	Nantes	Saint-Étienne
14:00 CEST (UTC+02:00)	Tabanou 18'; Theophile-Catherine (yellow card) 44'; Lemoine (yellow card) 70'; Ruffier (yellow card) 71'; Perrin (yellow card) 78'	Report	Bedoya (yellow card) 68'; Djilobodji (yellow card) 86'	Stadium: Stade Geoffroy-Guichard; Attendance: 37,417; Referee: Clément Turpin

18 April 2015 33	Nantes	1–0	Marseille	Nantes
20:30 CEST (UTC+02:00)	Gakpé 20'; Gomis (yellow card) 41'	Report	Morel (yellow card) 71'; N'Koulou (yellow card) 73'; Ayew (yellow card) 89'	Stadium: Stade de la Beaujoire; Attendance: 36,022; Referee: Stéphane Lannoy

25 April 2015 34	Toulouse	1–1	Nantes	Toulouse
20:00 CEST (UTC+02:00)	Regattin 22'; Trejo (yellow card) 70'	Report	Cissokho (yellow card) 29'; Gomis (yellow card) 51'; Bedoya 88'	Stadium: Stadium Municipal; Attendance: 17,274; Referee: Lionel Jaffredo

3 May 2015 35	Nantes	0–2	Paris Saint-Germain	Nantes
21:00 CEST (UTC+02:00)	Djilobodji (yellow card) 26'; Deaux (yellow card) 50'; Bessat 68'; Cissokho 81'	Report	Cavani 3'; Matuidi 31'; Verratti (yellow card) 37'; Maxwell (yellow card) 74'; Motta (yellow card) 79'	Stadium: Stade de la Beaujoire; Attendance: 34,088; Referee: Ruddy Buquet

9 May 2015 36	Bordeaux	2–1	Nantes	Bordeaux
20:00 CEST (UTC+02:00)	Rolán 20' (pen.), 69'; Contento (yellow card) 48'; Sertic (yellow card) 53'; Crivelli (yellow card) 87'	Report	Veretout 15' (pen.), (yellow card) 84'; Rongier (yellow card) 60'	Stadium: Stade Chaban-Delmas; Attendance: 31,495; Referee: Antony Gautier

16 May 2015 37	Nantes	1–1	Lorient	Nantes
21:00 CEST (UTC+02:00)	Audel 6'; Vizcarrondo (yellow card) 63'; Djilobodji (yellow card) 75'	Report	Djilobodji 4' (o.g.); N'Dong (yellow card) 41'	Stadium: Stade de la Beaujoire; Attendance: 28,321; Referee: Olivier Thual

23 May 2015 38	Lens	1–0	Nantes	Amiens
21:00 CEST (UTC+02:00)	Chavarria 5'; Moore (yellow card) 30'; Landre (yellow card) 47'	Report	Deaux (yellow card) 37'; Veretout (yellow card) 90+2'	Stadium: Stade de la Licorne; Attendance: 9,123; Referee: Sébastien Moreira

=== Coupe de la Ligue ===
28 October 2014 Round of 32	Nantes	4–0	Stade Laval	Nantes
20:00 CEST (UTC+02:00)	Shechter 4', 90+1'; Bessat 57'; Bangoura 72'	Report	Alla (yellow card) 71'	Stadium: Stade de la Beaujoire; Attendance: 24,551; Referee: Sébastien Desiage

16 December 2014 Round of 16	Nantes	4–2 (a.e.t.)	Metz	Nantes
21:00 CET (UTC+01:00)	Vizcarrondo 71'; Gakpé 83' (pen.); Riou (yellow card) 84'; Audel 92'; Deaux (yellow card) 94'; Gomis (yellow card) 101'; Bangoura 118'	Report	Falcón 60'; Doukouré 62'; Sarr (yellow card) 69'; Bussmann (red card) 82'; Vion (yellow card) 84'; Choplin (yellow card) 101'	Stadium: Stade de la Beaujoire; Attendance: 12,601; Referee: Amaury Delerue

14 January 2015 Quarter-finals	Lille	2–0	Nantes	Villeneuve-d'Ascq
21:00 CET (UTC+01:00)	Corchia 9'; Baša (yellow card) 53'; Kjær 69'	Report	Gakpé (yellow card) 57'	Stadium: Stade Pierre-Mauroy; Attendance: 11,106; Referee: Ruddy Buquet

=== Coupe de France ===
3 January 2015 Round of 64	Nantes	4–0	Club Franciscain	Nantes
15:15 CET (UTC+01:00)	Deaux 14'; Narcissot 32' (o.g.); Bedoya (yellow card) 33'; Gakpé (yellow card) 73'; Rongier 78'; Vizcarrondo 90+1'	Report 1, 2	Abaul (yellow card) 3'; Etinof (yellow card) 41'; Ephestion (red card) 52'	Stadium: Stade de la Beaujoire; Attendance: 15,316; Referee: Olivier Thual

20 January 2015 Round of 32	Nantes	3–2	Lyon	Nantes
21:00 CET (UTC+01:00)	Bessat 19', 21', 89'	Report 1, 2	Lacazette 5', (yellow card) 32'; Fekir 59'	Stadium: Stade de la Beaujoire; Attendance: 24,158; Referee: Lionel Jaffredo

11 February 2015 Round of 16	Paris Saint-Germain	2–0	Nantes	Paris
21:00 CET (UTC+01:00)	Cavani 18'; Cabaye 34'	Report	Cissokho (yellow card) 48'	Stadium: Parc des Princes; Attendance: 35,000; Referee: Stéphane Lannoy
