= 2018–19 FC Midtjylland season =

Midtjylland
2018–19 season
- Owner: Matthew Benham
- Chairman: Rasmus Ankersen
- Manager: Kenneth Andersen
- Stadium: MCH Arena
- Superliga: 2nd
- Danish Cup: Winners
- UEFA Champions League: Second qualifying round
- UEFA Europa League: Play-off round
- Top goalscorer: League: Paul Onuachu (17); All: Paul Onuachu (22)
- Highest home attendance: 10,973 - 16 September 2018 vs. F.C. Copenhagen
- Lowest home attendance: 4,368 - 16 August 2018 vs. The New Saints F.C.
- Average home league attendance: 7,014
- Biggest win: 5–0 - 11 November 2018 vs. Vejle BK
- Biggest defeat: 0–3 - 14 April 2019 vs. F.C. Copenhagen; 1–4 - 20 May 2019 vs. Brøndby IF
Home colours	Away colours	European away colours

The 2018–19 FC Midtjylland season is FC Midtjylland's 20th season of existence, and their 18th consecutive season in the Danish Superliga, the top tier of football in Denmark. In addition to a second place finish in the Superliga, Midtjylland won its first Danish Cup and competed in the UEFA Champions League qualifying rounds.

== Squad ==
As of 31 January 2019

No.	Name	Nat	Position	Since	Date of birth	Signed from
Goalkeepers
1	Jesper Hansen	(Denmark)	GK	2017	31 March 1985	(Denmark) Lyngby BK
30	Oliver Ottesen	(Denmark)	GK	2017	22 August 1998	(Denmark) Roskilde
31	Mikkel Andersen	(Denmark)	GK	2018	17 December 1988	(Denmark) Lyngby BK
Defenders
2	Kian Hansen	(Denmark)	DF	2015	3 March 1989	(France) FC Nantes
4	Zsolt Korcsmár	(Hungary)	DF	2017	9 January 1989	(Hungary) Vasas SC
5	Marc Dal Hende	(Denmark)	DF	2017	6 November 1990	(Denmark) SønderjyskE
6	Joel Andersson	(Sweden)	DF	2018	11 November 1996	(Sweden) BK Häcken
14	Alexander Scholz	(Denmark) (Germany)	DF	2018	24 October 1992	Club Brugge K.V.
20	Rasmus Nicolaisen	(Denmark)	DF	2017	16 March 1997	Homegrown
24	Mads Døhr Thychosen	(Denmark)	DF	2015	27 June 1997	(Denmark) VB
25	Manjrekar James	(Canada) (Dominica)	DF	2018	5 August 1993	(Denmark) FC Fredericia
27	Oliver Olsen	(Denmark)	DF	2018	13 August 2000	(Denmark) Esbjerg fB Youth
28	Erik Sviatchenko	(Denmark)	DF	2018	4 October 1991	(Scotland) Celtic F.C.
29	Rafał Kurzawa	(Poland)	DF	2019	29 January 1993	(France) Amiens SC
52	Patrick	(Brazil)	DF	2019	28 February 2000	(France) Amiens SC
Midfielders
3	Tim Sparv	(Finland)	MF	2014	20 February 1987	(Germany) Greuther Fürth
7	Jakob Poulsen	(Denmark)	MF	2014	7 July 1983	(France) AS Monaco FC
8	Ayo Simon Okosun	(Denmark)	MF	2018	21 July 1993	(Denmark) AC Horsens
10	Evander	(Brazil)	MF	2018	9 June 1998	(Brazil) Clube de Regatas do Flamengo
11	Awer Mabil	(Australia)	MF	2015	15 September 1995	(Australia) Adelaide United FC
15	Bozhidar Kraev	(Bulgaria)	MF	2017	23 June 1997	(Bulgaria) Levski Sofia
36	Rilwan Hassan	(Nigeria)	MF	2010	9 February 1991	Homegrown
38	Frank Onyeka	(Nigeria)	MF	2017	1 January 1998	(Nigeria) F.C. Ebedei
40	Jens-Lys Cajuste	(Sweden)	MF	2018	10 August 1999	(Sweden) Örgryte IS
43	Nicolas Madsen	(Denmark)	MF	2017	17 March 2000	Homegrown
88	Gustav Wikheim	(Norway)	MF	2017	18 March 1993	(Belgium) K.A.A. Gent
Forwards
19	Mayron George	(Costa Rica)	FW	2018	23 October 1993	(Denmark) Lyngby BK
26	Artem Dovbyk	(Ukraine)	FW	2018	21 June 1997	(Ukraine) FC Dnipro
33	Paul Onuachu	(Nigeria)	FW	2012	28 May 1994	(Nigeria) F.C. Ebedei
74	Júnior Brumado	(Brazil)	FW	2019	15 May 1999	(Brazil) Esporte Clube Bahia

== Transfers and loans ==
=== Arrivals ===
==== Summer ====
Position	Player	Transferred from	Date
MF	(Denmark) Ayo Simon Okosun	AC Horsens	1 July 2018
FW	(Costa Rica) Mayron George	Randers FC	1 July 2018
MF	(Sweden) Jens-Lys Cajuste	Örgryte IS	1 July 2018
MF	(Denmark) Erik Sviatchenko	Celtic F.C.	1 July 2018
DF	(Denmark) Oliver Olsen	FC Midtjylland U19	1 July 2018
DF	(Denmark) Sören Reese	Viborg FF	1 July 2018
MF	(Canada) Manjrekar James	Vasas SC	1 July 2018
MF	(Denmark) Sammy Skytte	Silkeborg IF	1 July 2018
MF	(Germany) Dominick Drexler	Holstein Kiel	1 July 2018
FW	(Denmark) Sebastian Buch	FC Midtjylland U19	1 July 2018
FW	(Denmark) Christian Tue Jensen	FC Midtjylland U19	1 July 2018
MF	(Ghana) Michael Baidoo	FC Midtjylland U19	1 July 2018
FW	(Denmark) Victor Torp	FC Midtjylland U19	1 July 2018
FW	(Nigeria) Henry Uzochokwu	FC Midtjylland U19	1 July 2018
DF	(Sweden) Joel Andersson	BK Häcken	2 July 2018
DF	(Denmark) (Germany) Alexander Scholz	Club Brugge K.V.	10 August 2018
GK	(Denmark) Mikkel Andersen	Lyngby BK	16 August 2018
Manager	(Denmark) Kenneth Andersen	FC Midtjylland U19	10 October 2018

==== Winter ====
Position	Player	Transferred from	Date
FW	(Norway) Chuma Anene	FC Fredericia	18 January 2019
FW	(Brazil) Júnior Brumado	Esporte Clube Bahia	31 January 2019

=== Loan in ===
Position	Player	Loaned from	Start	End
MF	(Brazil) Evander da Silva Ferreira	CR Vasco da Gama	27 August 2018	30 June 2019
DF	(Brazil) Patrick	Clube de Regatas do Flamengo	31 January 2019	30 June 2020
DF	(Poland) Rafał Kurzawa	Amiens SC	31 January 2019	30 June 2019

=== Departures ===
==== Summer ====
Position	Player	Transferred to	Date
DF	(Denmark) Andreas Poulsen	Borussia Mönchengladbach	1 July 2018
MF	(Finland) Markus Halsti	Esbjerg fB	1 July 2018
MF	(Netherlands) Rafael van der Vaart	Released	1 July 2018
MF	(Germany) Janus Drachmann	OB	18 July 2018
MF	(Germany) Dominick Drexler	1. FC Köln	20 July 2018
MF	(Denmark) Mikkel Duelund	FC Dynamo Kyiv	31 August 2018
DF	(The Gambia) Bubacarr Sanneh	RSC Anderlecht	31 August 2018
Manager	(Denmark) Jess Thorup	K.A.A. Gent	10 October 2018

==== Winter ====
Position	Player	Transferred to	Date
DF	(Denmark) Alexander Munksgaard	AGF Aarhus	4 January 2019
MF	(Denmark) Frederik Brandhof	Viborg FF	17 January 2019

=== Loan out ===
Position	Player	Loaned to	Start	End
DF	(Nigeria) Henry Uzochokwu	FC Fredericia	2 July 2018	30 June 2019
MF	(Denmark) Victor Torp	FC Fredericia	2 July 2018	30 June 2019
FW	(Iceland) Mikael Anderson	SBV Excelsior	2 July 2018	30 June 2019
MF	(Canada) Manjrekar James	FC Fredericia	2 July 2018	30 June 2019
DF	(Denmark) Søren Reese	AC Horsens	2 July 2018	30 June 2019
FW	(Denmark) Sebastian Buch	FC Fredericia	2 July 2018	30 June 2019
MF	(Denmark) Sammy Skytte	AC Horsens	2 July 2018	30 June 2019
MF	(Democratic Republic of the Congo) Gloire Rutikanga	Ringkøbing IF	13 July 2018	30 June 2019
FW	(Faroe Islands) Jákup Thomsen	FH Hafnarfjarðar	15 July 2018	31 December 2018
MF	(Denmark) Nikolaj Kirk	Brentford	16 July 2018	31 March 2019
MF	(Finland) Kaan Kairinen	FC Inter Turku	6 August 2018	31 December 2018
FW	(United States) Bill Hamid	D.C. United	8 August 2018	30 November 2019
DF	(Denmark) Kristian Riis	Esbjerg fB	21 August 2018	30 June 2019
MF	(Ghana) Michael Baidoo	FC Fredericia	31 August 2018	30 June 2019
MF	(Finland) Kaan Kairinen	HJK Helsinki	1 January 2019	31 December 2019
FW	(Faroe Islands) Jákup Thomsen	FH Hafnarfjarðar	18 January 2019	30 June 2019
FW	(Norway) Chuma Anene	FC Fredericia	18 January 2019	30 June 2019
MF	(Nigeria) Babajide David Akintola	Rosenborg BK	6 February 2019	31 December 2019
MF	(Denmark) Nikolaj Kirk	Stabæk	31 March 2019	25 July 2019

== Non-competitive ==
=== Pre-season Friendlies ===
23 June 2018	(Denmark) AGF Aarhus	1–3	(Denmark) Midtjylland	Aarhus
15:00	Junker 5'	Report	Mabil 66'; Korcsmár 68'; Kroon 70'	Stadium: Ceres Park

29 June 2018	(Denmark) Midtjylland	2–1	(Sweden) Malmö FF	Vildbjerg
15:00	Sanneh 51'; Sparv 73'	Report	Rosenberg 66' (pen.)	Stadium: Vildbjerg Sportscenter

30 June 2018	(Denmark) Midtjylland	2–2	(Denmark) FC Fredericia	Ikast
11:30	Duelund 75'; Kroon 81'	Report	Nielsen 12'; Høegh 21'	Stadium: Ikast FS baneanlæg

3 July 2018	(Denmark) SønderjyskE	2–1	(Denmark) Midtjylland	Haderslev
13:00	Lieder 41'; Zimling 72'	Report	Brandhof 75'	Stadium: Sydbank Park

4 July 2018	(Denmark) Midtjylland	4–1	(Denmark) Thisted FC	Herning
16:00	Dovbyk 14', 69'; Sparv 56'; Abubakar 87'	Report	Vang 88'	Stadium: MCH Arena

7 July 2018	(Netherlands) AZ Alkmaar	1–1	(Denmark) Midtjylland	Dirkshorn
15:00	Idrissi 10'	Report	Onuachu 64'	Stadium: Sportpark vv Dirkshorn

== Competitive ==
=== Competition record ===
Competition	Record							
Competition	G	W	D	L	GF	GA	GD	Win %
Superliga	36	21	8	7	76	43	+33	58.33
Danish Cup	5	4	1	0	11	2	+9	80.00
Champions League	2	0	1	1	1	2	−1	0.00
Europa League	4	2	1	1	7	5	+2	50.00
Total	47	27	11	9	95	52	+43	57.45

Last updated: 25 May 2019.
Source: Competitive matches

=== Danish Superliga ===
==== Regular season ====
Pos	Team	Pld	W	D	L	GF	GA	GD	Pts	Qualification
1	Copenhagen	26	19	4	3	65	23	+42	61	Qualification for the Championship round
2	Midtjylland	26	18	6	2	62	26	+36	60	Qualification for the Championship round
3	OB	26	12	6	8	35	31	+4	42	Qualification for the Championship round
4	Brøndby	26	11	5	10	44	40	+4	38	Qualification for the Championship round
5	Esbjerg	26	11	5	10	32	35	−3	38	Qualification for the Championship round

Source: Danish Football Association (in Danish), Soccerway
Rules for classification: 1) Points; 2) Goal difference; 3) Goals scored; 4) Away goals scored; 5) Play-off (played on neutral ground if determining teams for different rounds); 6) Draw.

===== Matches =====
14 July 2018 Round 1	FC Midtjylland	0–0	AGF Aarhus	Herning
19:00 CEST	Duelund (yellow card) 13'; Nicolaisen (yellow card) 53'; Sviatchenko (yellow card) 70'	Summary	Kanstrup (yellow card) 87'	Stadium: MCH Arena; Attendance: 7,123; Referee: Anders Poulsen

20 July 2018 Round 2	AaB	2–1	FC Midtjylland	Aalborg
19:00 CEST	Thellufsen 52'; Abildgaard (yellow card) 54'; Pohl 87'	Summary	Dovbyk (yellow card) 24'; Onuachu 42' (Sviatchenko) (yellow card) 60'; Sviatchenko (yellow card) 45+1'; Munksgaard (yellow card) 68'	Stadium: Aalborg Portland Park; Attendance: 6,433; Referee: Mads-Kristoffer Kristoffersen

28 July 2018 Round 3	FC Midtjylland	3–1	Esbjerg fB	Herning
16:00 CEST	Wikheim 15' (Poulsen); Poulsen 34' (pen.); Nicolaisen (yellow card) 63'; Onyeka 90' (Okosun)	Summary	Agus (yellow card) 9'; Kauko (yellow card) 30'; Parunashvili 45'	Stadium: MCH Arena; Attendance: 6,612; Referee: Jakob Kehlet

4 August 2018 Round 4	Vejle BK	1–3	FC Midtjylland	Vejle
19:00 CEST	Sousa 17'; Illoy-Ayyet (yellow card) 47'; Mucolli (yellow card) 49'; Louati (yellow card) 69'; Nilsson (yellow card) 89'	Summary	Nicolaisen 79' (Poulsen) 84' (Poulsen); Thychosen 87' (Hansen)	Stadium: Vejle Stadium; Attendance: 7,519; Referee: Jørgen Daugbjerg Burchardt

12 August 2018 Round 5	FC Midtjylland	3–0	AC Horsens	Herning
20:00 CEST	Onuachu (yellow card) 25'; Poulsen 37' (pen.); Wikheim 46' (Onuachu); George 85' (Thychosen)	FCM Report	Andersen (yellow card) 25' (yellow-red card) 36'; Nilsen (yellow card) 48'	Stadium: MCH Arena; Attendance: 5,032; Referee: Michael Johansen

19 August 2018 Round 6	OB	1–1	FC Midtjylland	Odense
20:00 CEST	Helenius 90+3'	FCM Report	Duelund (yellow card) 13'; Dal Hende 74' (Duelund)	Stadium: EWII Park; Attendance: 4,646; Referee: Anders Poulsen

26 August 2018 Round 7	FC Midtjylland	3–0	Randers FC	Herning
20:00 CEST	Mabil 45+3'; Nicolaisen 66' (Andersson); George 73' (Mabil); Sviatchenko (yellow card) 78'	FCM Report		Stadium: MCH Arena; Attendance: 4,906; Referee: Peter Kjærsgaard-Andersen

2 September 2018 Round 8	Brøndby IF	2–2	FC Midtjylland	Brøndby
20:00 CEST	Mukhtar 19' (Laursen); Laursen 59' (Mukhtar); Kaiser (yellow card) 83'	FCM Report	George 25' (yellow card) 66' (yellow-red card) 66'; Dal Hende (yellow card) 53'; Onkeya (yellow card) 65'; Sviatchenko 80' (Hansen)	Stadium: Brøndby Stadium; Attendance: 14,211; Referee: Jakob Kehlet

16 September 2018 Round 9	FC Midtjylland	3–1	F.C. Copenhagen	Herning
18:00 CEST	Poulsen 15' (pen.); Onuachu 61' (Mabil); Dal Hende 83'; Andersson (yellow card) 90+1'	FCM Report	Joronen (yellow card) 17'; Ankersen (yellow card) 69'; N'Doye 74' (Fischer); Fischer (yellow card) 87'	Stadium: MCH Arena; Attendance: 10,973; Referee: Mads-Kristoffer Kristoffersen

23 September 2018 Round 10	SønderjyskE	0–0	FC Midtjylland	Haderslev
12:00 CEST	Vinderslev (yellow card) 6'; Pedersen (yellow card) 25'; Jakobsen (yellow card) 32'	FCM Report	Dal Hende (yellow card) 2'; Sviatchenko (red card) 26'; Andersson (yellow card) 63'	Stadium: Sydbank Park; Attendance: 5,785; Referee: Jorgen Daugbjerg Burchardt

29 September 2018 Round 11	FC Midtjylland	5–2	Hobro IK	Herning
16:00 CEST	Sparv 11' (Nicolaisen) 44' (Andersson); Dal Hende 24' (Mabil); Nicolaisen 34'; Onuachu 72' (Andersson)	FCM Report	Kristoffersen 56' (Hammershøy-Mistrati); Hammershøy-Mistrati 67' (Pedersen)	Stadium: MCH Arena; Attendance: 6,092; Referee: Benjamin Willaume-Jantzen

7 October 2018 Round 12	FC Midtjylland	3–0	Vendsyssel FF	Herning
20:00 CEST	Poulsen (yellow card) 23'; Onuachu 29' (Mabil); Henriksen 42' (o.g.); Nicolaisen (yellow card) 64'; Hassan 90+1' (Andersson)	FCM Report	Wohlgemuth (yellow card) 62'; Þorsteinsson (yellow card) 67'	Stadium: MCH Arena; Attendance: 5,032; Referee: Peter Kjærsgaard-Andersen

20 October 2018 Round 13	FC Nordsjælland	1–4	FC Midtjylland	Farum
16:00 CEST	Donyoh 50' (Amon); Jenssen (yellow card) 81'; Rygaard Jensen (yellow card) 90+1'	FCM Report	Onuachu 33' 53' (Mabil) 78' (Hassan); Poulsen (yellow card) 77'; K. Hansen (yellow card) 83'; Evander 86' (George) (yellow card) 90+2'	Stadium: Right to Dream Park; Attendance: 3,574; Referee: Morten Krogh

29 October 2018 Round 14	FC Midtjylland	3–2	Brøndby IF	Herning
19:00 CEST	Dal Hende 5' 77' (Poulsen); Mabil 47' (Andersson); Andersson (yellow card) 70'; Hassan (yellow card) 90+1'	FCM Report	Bech 4' (Wilczek); Larsson 31' (Arajuuri); Halimi (yellow card) 90+2'	Stadium: MCH Arena; Attendance: 10,106; Referee: Mads-Kristoffer Kristoffersen

4 November 2018 Round 15	Esbjerg fB	2–2	FC Midtjylland	Esbjerg
18:30 CEST	Sørensen 46'; McGrath (yellow card) 90+2'; Kauko (yellow card) 90+3'; Austin (yellow card) 90+4'; Højbjerg (yellow card) 90+5'; Petre 90+5' (Brinch) (yellow card) 90+7'	FCM Report	Scholz 50'; Onuachu (yellow card) 51' (goal) 66' (Mabil); Dal Hende (yellow card) 90+5'	Stadium: Blue Water Arena; Attendance: 7,022; Referee: Benjamin Willaume-Jantzen

11 November 2018 Round 16	FC Midtjylland	5–0	Vejle BK	Herning
18:00 CEST	Mabil 21' (Evander) 65' (Wikheim); Onuachu 24' (Dal Hende); Evander 51' (Mabil); Poulsen 71' (Mabil)	FCM Report	Lauritsen (yellow card) 10'	Stadium: MCH Arena; Attendance: 6,855; Referee: Sandi Putros

25 November 2018 Round 17	F.C. Copenhagen	2–1	FC Midtjylland	Copenhagen
18:00	Skov 34' (pen.); Ankersen (yellow card) 41'; Bengtsson (yellow card) 80'; Greguš 82'	FCM Report	Dal Hende (yellow card) 74'; Greguš 78' (o.g.); Poulsen (yellow card) 90'	Stadium: Telia Parken; Attendance: 18,553; Referee: Jakob Kehlet

2 December 2018 Round 18	Randers FC	1–2	FC Midtjylland	Randers
14:00 CEST	Egho (yellow card) 18' (goal) 33' (Stokke); Marxen (yellow card) 90'	FCM Report	Mabil 3' (Onuachu); Onuachu 58' (Sviatchenko); Sviatchenko (yellow card) 75'; Hassan (yellow card) 77'	Stadium: Cepheus Park Randers; Attendance: 2,401; Referee: Jørgen Daugbjerg Burchardt

7 December 2018 Round 19	FC Midtjylland	3–0	OB	Herning
19:00 CEST	Scholz 24' (Nicolaisen); Poulsen 38' (pen.); Nicolaisen (yellow card) 51' (yellow-red card) 90+5'; George (yellow card) 58'; Dal Hende (yellow card) 59'; Andersson 89'	FCM Report	Lund (yellow card) 37'; Laursen (yellow card) 39'; Grytebust (yellow card) 59'	Stadium: MCH Arena; Attendance: 7,034; Referee: Jorgen Daugbjerg Burchardt

16 December 2018 Round 20	AC Horsens	1–3	FC Midtjylland	Horsens
14:00 CEST	Hansson (yellow card) 20'; Drost 35' (Frantsen)	FCM Report	Hassan 12' (Onuachu); K. Hansen (yellow card) 42'; Scholz 46' (Thychosen) (yellow card) 56'; Onyeka (yellow card) 84'; Onuachu 90' (Wikheim)	Stadium: CASA Arena Horsens; Attendance: 2,741; Referee: Michael Tykgaard

11 February 2019 Round 21	Vendsyssel FF	0–1	FC Midtjylland	Hjørring
19:00 CEST	Júnior (yellow card) 38'	FCM Report	K. Hansen 24' (Poulsen); George (yellow card) 87'	Stadium: Nord Energi Arena; Attendance: 1,453; Referee: Jens Maae

18 February 2019 Round 22	FC Midtjylland	2–1	AaB	Herning
19:00 CEST	Onuachu 45' (K. Hansen); Evander 51' (Poulsen); Sviatchenko (yellow card) 85'; Onyeka (yellow card) 89'	FCM Report	van Weert 57'; Rinne (yellow card) 90+4'	Stadium: MCH Arena; Attendance: 7,442; Referee: Jakob Kehlet

24 February 2019 Round 23	AGF Aarhus	1–2	FC Midtjylland	Aarhus
16:00 CEST	Ankersen 32' (Jakobsen); Højer (yellow card) 39' (yellow-red card) 90+3'; Mortensen (yellow card) 79'; Juelsgård (yellow card) 90'	FCM Report	Onuachu 38' (Hansen) 53' (Mabil) (yellow card) 46' (yellow-red card) 67'; Dal Hende (yellow card) 38' (yellow-red card) 77'; Hansen (yellow card) 86'	Stadium: Ceres Park; Attendance: 11,787; Referee: Jorgen Daugbjerg Burchardt

4 March 2019 Round 24	FC Midtjylland	3–3	FC Nordsjælland	Herning
19:00 CEST	Onuachu (yellow card) 6'; Thychosen 14' (Hassan); Evander 71' (73)	FCM Report	Olsen 6' (pen.) 33' (Andersen); Mumin (yellow card) 31'; Kudus 57' (Rasmussen)	Stadium: MCH Arena; Attendance: 6,840; Referee: Michael Tykgaard

8 March 2019 Round 25	Hobro IK	1–2	FC Midtjylland	Hobro
19:00 CEST	Babayan 51' (Hammershøy-Mistrati); Haarup (yellow card) 84'	FCM Report	Evander 25' (Onuachu); George 80' (Evander)	Stadium: DS Arena; Attendance: 2,014; Referee: Jakob Kehlet

17 March 2019 Round 26	FC Midtjylland	2–1	SønderjyskE	Haderslev
TBD CEST	Kurzawa 24' (Onyeka); Onyeka (yellow card) 54' (goal) 59'	FCM Report	Lieder 4'; Rømer (yellow card) 22'; Pedersen (yellow card) 86'	Stadium: Sydbank Park; Referee: Jens Maae

===== Championship round =====
Pos	Team	Pld	W	D	L	GF	GA	GD	Pts	Qualification	COP	MID	ESB	BRO	ODE	NOR
1	Copenhagen (C)	36	26	4	6	86	37	+49	82	Qualification for the Champions League second qualifying round	—	3–0	1–0	3–2	4–0	1–3
2	Midtjylland	36	21	8	7	76	43	+33	71	Qualification for the Europa League third qualifying round	4–0	—	1–2	1–2	2–0	0–0
3	Esbjerg	36	16	8	12	45	47	−2	56	Qualification for the Europa League second qualifying round	4–3	2–2	—	1–0	0–0	0–0
4	Brøndby (O)	36	15	7	14	60	52	+8	52	Qualification for the European play-off match	1–2	4–1	0–1	—	2–2	2–0
5	Odense	36	14	10	12	48	48	0	52		0–1	3–1	4–1	0–2	—	2–2
6	Nordsjælland	36	10	14	12	52	54	−2	44		0–3	1–2	1–2	1–1	2–2	—

Source: Soccerway
(C) Champions; (O) Play-off winners

====== Matches ======
30 March 2019 Championship Round 1	FC Midtjylland	0–0	FC Nordsjælland	Herning
16:00 CEST	K. Hansen (yellow card) 34'	FCM Summary	Vindahl-Jensen (yellow card) 90+2'	Stadium: MCH Arena; Attendance: 6,675; Referee: Peter Kjærsgaard-Andersen

7 April 2019 Championship Round 2	Esbjerg fB	2–2	FC Midtjylland	Esbjerg
16:00 CEST	Yakovenko 61' (Lauridsen) (yellow card) 68'; Lauridsen (yellow card) 83'; Austin	FCM Report	Onyeka 47' (Wikheim); Poulsen 71'; Onuachu (yellow card) 74'	Stadium: Blue Water Arena; Attendance: 6,162; Referee: Sandi Putros

14 April 2019 Championship Round 3	FC Midtjylland	2–0	OB	Herning
18:00 CEST	Poulsen 28' (pen.); Onyeka 54' (Kurzawa)	FCM Report	Tverskov (yellow card) 27'	Stadium: MCH Arena; Attendance: 8,035; Referee: Jens Maae

18 April 2019 Championship Round 4	FC Copenhagen	3–0	FC Midtjylland	Copenhagen
18:00 CEST	Bjelland 26'; Falk (yellow card) 31'; N'Doye 39' 63' (Wind)	FCM Summary		Stadium: Telia Parken; Attendance: 25,321; Referee: Mads-Kristoffer Kristoffersen

22 April 2019 Championship Round 5	FC Midtjylland	1–2	Brøndby IF	Herning
18:00 CEST	Dal Hende 9'	FCM Report	Hedlund 12' (Schwäbe); Gammelby 75' (Mukhtar)	Stadium: MCH Arena; Attendance: 10,124; Referee: Michael Tykgaard

29 April 2019 Championship Round 6	FC Nordsjælland	1–2	FC Midtjylland	Farum
19:00 CEST	Amon 19' (Damsgaard); Kudus (yellow card) 58'; Mumin (red card) 73'; Bartolec (yellow card) 74'	FCM Report	Sviatchenko (yellow card) 16'; Onuachu 50' (Dal Hende) 61' (Dal Hende) (yellow card) 80'; Wikheim (yellow card) 73'; Dal Hende (yellow card) 90+4'	Stadium: Right to Dream Park; Attendance: 2,413; Referee: Sandi Putros

5 May 2018 Championship Round 7	OB	3–1	FC Midtjylland	Odense
18:00 CEST	Ludwig 40' (O. Lund); Thomasen 47' (Bashkim Kadrii); Drachmann (yellow card) 57'; M. Lund (yellow card) 60'; Nielsen 63' (Bashkim Kadrii)	FCM Report	Dal Hende 62' (Nicolaisen)	Stadium: Nature Energy Park; Attendance: 4,653; Referee: Morten Krogh

12 May 2019 Championship Round 8	FC Midtjylland	4–0	F.C. Copenhagen	Herning
20:00 CEST	Onuachu 21'; Hansen (yellow card) 34'; Evander 53' (Wikheim); Mabil 89' (pen.); Wikheim 90+1' (Evander)	FCM Report	Bjelland (yellow card) 82'; Falk (yellow card) 84'; Joronen (yellow card) 86'	Stadium: MCH Arena; Attendance: 7,343; Referee: Anders Poulsen

20 May 2019 Championship Round 9	Brøndby IF	4–1	FC Midtjylland	Brøndby
19:00 CEST	Wilczek 38' (Arajuuri); Hedlund 45' (Jung); Erceg (yellow card) 45+3' (goal) 79'; Tibbling 64'; Radošević (yellow card) 86'	FCM Report	James (yellow card) 3'; Evander 14'	Stadium: Brøndby Stadium; Attendance: 7,468; Referee: Jakob Kehlet

25 May 2019 Championship Round 10	FC Midtjylland	1–2	Esbjerg fB	Herning
17:00 CEST	Evander 35' (Poulsen) (yellow card) 40'; Mabil (yellow card) 84'	FCM Report	Yakovenko 7' (Kristensen); Tighadouini 24'; Anyembe (yellow card) 39'; Lauridsen (yellow card) 56'; Parunashvili (yellow card) 78'	Stadium: MCH Arena; Attendance: 8,291; Referee: Jorgen Daugbjerg Burchardt

=== Danish Cup ===
26 September 2018 Third Round	Dalum IF	1–2 (a.e.t.)	FC Midtjylland	Odense
16:30 CEST	Stoustrup; Andersen (yellow card)	FCM Report	Evander (yellow card) 38' (goal) 49'; Onuachu 96'; Wikheim (yellow card) 105'	Stadium: Lars R. Jacobsen Park; Attendance: 1,175; Referee: Mads-Kristoffer Kristoffersen

1 November 2018 Fourth Round	FC Midtjylland	2–0	Copenhagen	Herning
19:30 CEST	Sviatchenko 5'; Onuachu (yellow card) 51'; Wikheim 62'; Dal Hende (yellow card) 90'	FCM Report	Skov (yellow card) 90'	Stadium: MCH Arena; Attendance: 7,366; Referee: Jakob Kehlet

13 March 2019 Quarter-finals	Kolding IF	0–2	FC Midtjylland	Kolding
18:00 CEST	Smidt (yellow card) 47'; Nielsen (yellow card) 90'	FCM Report	Wikheim 22'; George 46'; Mabil (yellow card) 53'; Kraev (yellow card) 90'	Stadium: Autocentral Park; Attendance: 6,050; Referee: Peter Kjærsgaard-Andersen

3 April 2019 Semi-finals	FC Midtjylland	4–0	OB	Herning
19:30 CEST	Kløve 31' (o.g.); Onuachu 47', 72'; Wikheim 87'	FCM Report	O. Lund (yellow card) 29'	Stadium: MCH Arena; Attendance: 7,549; Referee: Michael Johansen

17 May 2019 Final	FC Midtjylland	1–1 (a.e.t.) (4–3 p)	Brøndby IF	Copenhagen
20:00	K. Hansen 6'; Onuachu (yellow card) 31'; Poulsen (yellow card) 31'	Report	Kaiser 21'; Wilczek (yellow card) 120'	Stadium: Telia Parken; Attendance: 31,340; Referee: Peter Kjærsgaard-Andersen
	Penalties
	Poulsen (penalty scored); Thychosen (penalty missed); Dal Hende (penalty scored); Mabil (penalty scored); Scholz (penalty scored)		Kaiser (penalty missed); Jung (penalty scored); Wilczek (penalty scored); Radošević (penalty missed); Halimi (penalty scored)

=== UEFA Champions League ===
==== Second qualifying round ====
24 July 2018 First leg	FC Astana (Kazakhstan)	2–1	(Denmark) FC Midtjylland	(Kazakhstan) Astana
16:00 CEST	Kleinheisler 31' (90+4); Almeida (yellow card) 81'	UEFA Report; FCM Report; FC Astana Report	Sanneh (yellow card) 19'; Wikheim 51'; Poulsen (yellow card) 81'	Stadium: Astana Arena; Attendance: 23,010; Referee: (Romania) Radu Petrescu

1 August 2018 Second leg	FC Midtjylland (Denmark)	0–0	(Kazakhstan) FC Astana	Herning
19:00 CEST	Sparv (yellow card) 48'; Korcsmár (yellow card) 59'; Mabil (yellow card) 80'; Okosun (yellow card) 90+6'	UEFA Report; FCM Report; FC Astana Report	Aničić (yellow card) 65'; Mayewski (yellow card) 81'; Muzhikov (yellow card) 90'; Postnikov (yellow card) 90+6'	Stadium: MCH Arena; Attendance: 8,731; Referee: (Spain) Juan Martínez Munuera

=== UEFA Europa League ===
==== Third qualifying round ====
9 August 2018 First leg	(Wales) The New Saints	0–2	(Denmark) FC Midtjylland	(Wales) Cardiff
16:00 CEST	Edwards (yellow card) 57'	FCM Report	Onuachu 9' (Poulsen) 27' (Poulsen)	Stadium: Cardiff City Stadium; Attendance: 863; Referee: (Slovakia) Petár Kralovic

16 August 2018 Second leg	FC Midtjylland (Denmark)	3–1	(Wales) The New Saints	Herning
19:00 CEST	George 16' (yellow card) 90+1'; Okosun 62' 80' (Thychosen)	FCM Report	Ebbe 22'; Cabango (yellow card) 45'	Stadium: MCH Arena; Attendance: 4,368; Referee: (Bosnia and Herzegovina) Irfan Peljto

==== Play-off round ====
23 August 2018 First leg	(Sweden) Malmö FF	2–2	(Denmark) FC Midtjylland	(Sweden) Malmö
19:15 CEST	Rosenberg 12' (Antonsson); Lewicki (yellow card) 18'; Antonsson 24'; Nielsen (yellow card) 89'; Rieks (yellow card) 90+1'	FCM Report	Poulsen (yellow card) 51'; K. Hansen (yellow card) 54'; Wikheim 60' (Onyeka); Sanneh (yellow card) 70'; Okosun 77' (yellow card) 90+1'; Andersson (yellow card) 83'	Stadium: Swedbank Stadion; Attendance: 11,487; Referee: (Serbia) Srđan Jovanović

30 August 2018 Second leg	FC Midtjylland (Denmark)	0–2	(Sweden) Malmö FF	Herning
19:15 CEST	Scholz (yellow card) 22'; Onyeka (yellow card) 41'; Wikheim (yellow card) 90+2'; George (yellow card) 90+2'	FCM Report	Antonsson 33'; Rosenberg (yellow card) 36' (goal) 79'; Vindheim (yellow card) 75'; Safari (yellow card) 89'	Stadium: MCH Arena; Attendance: 9,175; Referee: (Netherlands) Serdar Gözübüyük

== Statistics ==
=== Appearances ===
As of 25 May 2019

This includes all competitive matches.

Rnk	Pos	No.	Player	Superliga	Danish Cup	UEFA Champions League	UEFA Europa League	Total
1	MF	7	(Denmark) Jakob Poulsen	34	5	2	4	45
2	GK	1	(Denmark) Jesper Hansen	34	4	2	4	44
3	FW	33	(Nigeria) Paul Onuachu	30	4	2	4	40
3	MF	45	(Australia) Awer Mabil	30	5	1	4	40
5	DF	2	(Denmark) Kian Hansen	27	4	2	4	37
5	MF	88	(Norway) Gustav Wikheim	28	4	2	3	37
5	DF	6	(Sweden) Joel Andersson	30	3	0	4	37
8	FW	19	(Costa Rica) Mayron George	26	4	1	3	34
9	DF	14	(Denmark) Alexander Scholz	27	4	0	2	33
10	DF	28	(Denmark) Erik Sviatchenko	27	4	1	0	32
11	DF	5	(Denmark) Marc Dal Hende	24	2	2	3	31
12	MF	10	(Brazil) Evander	26	4	0	0	30
13	MF	38	(Nigeria) Frank Onyeka	21	3	1	3	28
13	MF	3	(Finland) Tim Sparv	21	3	2	2	28
15	MF	36	(Nigeria) Rilwan Hassan	18	2	0	0	20
15	DF	20	(Denmark) Rasmus Nicolaisen	17	1	0	2	20
17	DF	24	(Denmark) Mads Døhr Thychosen	13	3	0	2	18
18	MF	8	(Denmark) Ayo Simon Okosun	10	1	2	4	17
19	MF	15	(Bulgaria) Bozhidar Kraev	12	2	0	1	15
20	DF	25	(The Gambia) Bubacarr Sanneh	4	0	2	3	9
21	DF	13	(Denmark) Alexander Munksgaard	4	1	2	1	8
21	FW	29	(Poland) Rafał Kurzawa	6	2	0	0	8
23	MF	22	(Denmark) Mikkel Duelund	5	0	1	1	7
23	DF	4	(Hungary) Zsolt Korcsmár	4	1	1	1	7
25	DF	25	(Canada) (Dominica) Manjrekar James	6	0	0	0	6
26	FW	26	(Ukraine) Artem Dovbyk	4	1	0	0	5
27	FW	74	(Brazil) Júnior Brumado	4	0	0	0	4
28	MF	40	(Sweden) Jens-Lys Cajuste	2	1	0	0	3
28	GK	11	(Denmark) Mikkel Andersen	2	1	0	0	3
30	MF	17	(Ghana) Michael Baidoo	0	0	0	1	1
30	MF	29	(Denmark) Frederik Brandhof	0	1	0	0	1
30	MF	43	(Denmark) Nicolas Madsen	0	1	0	0	1
30	DF	27	(Denmark) Oliver Olsen	1	0	0	0	1

=== Goalscorers ===
As of 25 May 2019

This includes all competitive matches.

Rnk	Pos	No.	Player	Superliga	Danish Cup	UEFA Champions League	UEFA Europa League	Total
1	FW	33	(Nigeria) Paul Onuachu	17	3	0	2	22
2	MF	10	(Brazil) Evander	9	1	0	0	'10
3	MF	88	(Denmark) Gustav Wikheim	3	3	1	1	8
4	MF	7	(Denmark) Jakob Poulsen	7	0	0	0	7
4	DF	5	(Denmark) Marc Dal Hende	7	0	0	0	7
6	FW	19	(Costa Rica) Mayron George	4	1	0	1	6
6	MF	45	(Australia) Awer Mabil	6	0	0	0	6
8	DF	20	(Denmark) Rasmus Nicolaisen	4	0	0	0	4
8	MF	38	(Nigeria) Frank Onyeka	4	0	0	0	4
10	MF	8	(Denmark) Ayo Simon Okosun	0	0	0	3	3
10	DF	14	(Denmark) Alexander Scholz	3	0	0	0	3
12	MF	3	(Finland) Tim Sparv	2	0	0	0	2
12	DF	28	(Denmark) Erik Sviatchenko	1	1	0	0	2
12	MF	36	(Nigeria) Rilwan Hassan	2	0	0	0	2
12	DF	2	(Denmark) Kian Hansen	1	1	0	0	2
16	DF	24	(Denmark) Mads Døhr Thychosen	1	0	0	0	1
16	DF	6	(Sweden) Joel Andersson	1	0	0	0	1
16	DF	29	(Poland) Rafał Kurzawa	1	0	0	0	1
TOTALS				76	10	1	7	94

=== Assists ===
As of 25 May 2019

This includes all competitive matches.

Rnk	Pos	No.	Player	Superliga	Danish Cup	UEFA Champions League	UEFA Europa League	Total
1	MF	45	(Australia) Awer Mabil	9	0	0	0	9
2	MF	7	(Denmark) Jakob Poulsen	7	0	0	2	9
3	DF	6	(Sweden) Joel Andersson	5	0	0	0	5
3	FW	33	(Nigeria) Paul Onuachu	5	0	0	0	5
5	DF	2	(Denmark) Kian Hansen	4	0	0	0	4
6	DF	24	(Denmark) Mads Døhr Thychosen	2	0	0	1	3
6	DF	20	(Denmark) Rasmus Nicolaisen	3	0	0	0	3
6	MF	10	(Brazil) Evander	3	0	0	0	3
6	MF	88	(Norway) Gustav Wikheim	3	0	0	0	3
10	MF	28	(Denmark) Erik Sviatchenko	2	0	0	0	2
10	FW	19	(Costa Rica) Mayron George	2	0	0	0	2
10	MF	36	(Nigeria) Rilwan Hassan	2	0	0	0	2
10	MF	38	(Nigeria) Frank Onyeka	1	0	0	1	2
10	MF	5	(Denmark) Marc Dal Hende	2	0	0	0	2
16	MF	8	(Denmark) Ayo Simon Okosun	1	0	0	0	1
16	MF	22	(Denmark) Mikkel Duelund	1	0	0	0	1
16	DF	29	(Poland) Rafał Kurzawa	1	0	0	0	1
TOTALS				53	0	0	4	57

=== Clean Sheets ===
As of 25 May 2019

This includes all competitive matches.

Rnk	Pos	No.	Player	Superliga	Danish Cup	UEFA Champions League	UEFA Europa League	Total
1	GK	1	(Denmark) Jesper Hansen	10	3	1	1	15
2	GK	31	(Denmark) Mikkel Andersen	1	0	0	0	1
TOTALS				11	3	1	1	16

=== Disciplinary record ===
As of 25 May 2019

This includes all competitive matches.

Rnk	Pos.	No.	Player	Superliga		Danish Cup		UEFA Champions League		UEFA Europa League		Total	
Rnk	Pos.	No.	Player	Booked	Sent off (straight red)	Booked	Sent off (straight red)	Booked	Sent off (straight red)	Booked	Sent off (straight red)	Booked	Sent off (straight red)
1	FW	33	(Nigeria) Paul Onuachu	8	1	2	0	0	0	1	0	12	1
2	DF	5	(Denmark) Marc Dal Hende	9	1	1	0	0	0	0	0	9	1
3	FW	19	(Costa Rica) Mayron George	4	1	0	0	0	0	2	0	6	1
3	DF	28	(Denmark) Erik Sviatchenko	6	1	0	0	0	0	0	0	6	1
5	MF	7	(Denmark) Jakob Poulsen	3	0	1	0	1	0	1	0	6	0
6	DF	20	(Denmark) Rasmus Nicolaisen	4	1	0	0	0	0	0	0	4	1
6	MF	38	(Nigeria) Frank Onyeka	4	0	0	0	0	0	1	0	5	0
6	DF	2	(Denmark) Kian Hansen	3	0	0	0	0	0	1	0	5	0
9	DF	6	(Sweden) Joel Andersson	3	0	0	0	0	0	1	0	4	0
10	MF	88	(Norway) Gustav Wikheim	1	0	1	0	0	0	1	0	3	0
10	MF	10	(Brazil) Evander	2	0	1	0	0	0	0	0	3	0
10	MF	45	(Australia) Awer Mabil	1	0	1	0	1	0	0	0	3	0
13	MF	22	(Denmark) Mikkel Duelund	2	0	0	0	0	0	0	0	2	0
13	DF	25	(The Gambia) Bubacarr Sanneh	0	0	0	0	1	0	1	0	2	0
13	DF	14	(Denmark) Alexander Scholz	1	0	0	0	0	0	1	0	2	0
16	DF	13	(Denmark) Alexander Munksgaard	1	0	0	0	0	0	0	0	1	0
16	FW	26	(Ukraine) Artem Dovbyk	1	0	0	0	0	0	0	0	1	0
16	MF	3	(Denmark) Tim Sparv	0	0	0	0	1	0	0	0	1	0
16	MF	8	(Denmark) Ayo Simon Okosun	0	0	0	0	1	0	0	0	1	0
16	DF	4	(Hungary) Zsolt Korcsmár	0	0	0	0	1	0	0	0	1	0
16	MF	36	(Nigeria) Rilwan Olanrewaju Hassan	1	0	0	0	0	0	0	0	1	0
16	GK	1	(Denmark) Jesper Hansen	1	0	0	0	0	0	0	0	1	0
16	MF	15	(Bulgaria) Bozhidar Kraev	0	0	1	0	0	0	0	0	1	0
16	DF	25	(Canada) (Dominica) Manjrekar James	1	0	0	0	0	0	0	0	1	0
TOTALS				57	5	8	0	6	0	10	0	83	5

=== Suspensions ===
As of 24 September 2018

This includes all competitive matches.

Rnk	Pos	No.	Player	Superliga	Danish Cup	UEFA Champions League	UEFA Europa League	Total
1	FW	19	(Costa Rica) Mayron George (3–18 September 2018)	1	0	0	0	1
1	DF	28	(Denmark) Erik Sviatchenko (24 September – 9 October 2018)	1	0	0	0	1
TOTALS				2	0	0	0	2

== Awards ==
=== Team ===
Award	Month	Source

=== Individual ===
No.	Player	Award	Month	Source
29	Erik Sviatchenko	Team of the Month	July	www.superliga.dk
5	Marc Dal Hende	Player of the Month	September	www.superliga.dk
5	Marc Dal Hende	Team of the Month	September	www.superliga.dk
6	Joel Andersson	Team of the Month	September	www.superliga.dk
45	Awer Mabil	Team of the Month	October	www.superliga.dk
33	Paul Onuachu	Team of the Month	October	www.superliga.dk
45	Awer Mabil	Team of the Month	November	www.superliga.dk
33	Paul Onuachu	Team of the Month	November	www.superliga.dk
33	Paul Onuachu	Team of the Month	February	www.superliga.dk
2	Kian Hansen	Team of the Month	March	www.superliga.dk
10	Evander	Team of the Month	May	www.superliga.dk
