= Mikkel Pedersen =

Mikkel Pedersen may refer to:

- Mikkel Pedersen (footballer) (born 1996), Danish footballer
- Mikkel O. Pedersen (born 1997), Danish racing driver
- Mikkel Gaarde Pedersen (born 2008), Danish racing driver

== See also ==
- Mikael Pedersen, Danish inventor
