= Jordan Veretout =

French footballer (born 1993)

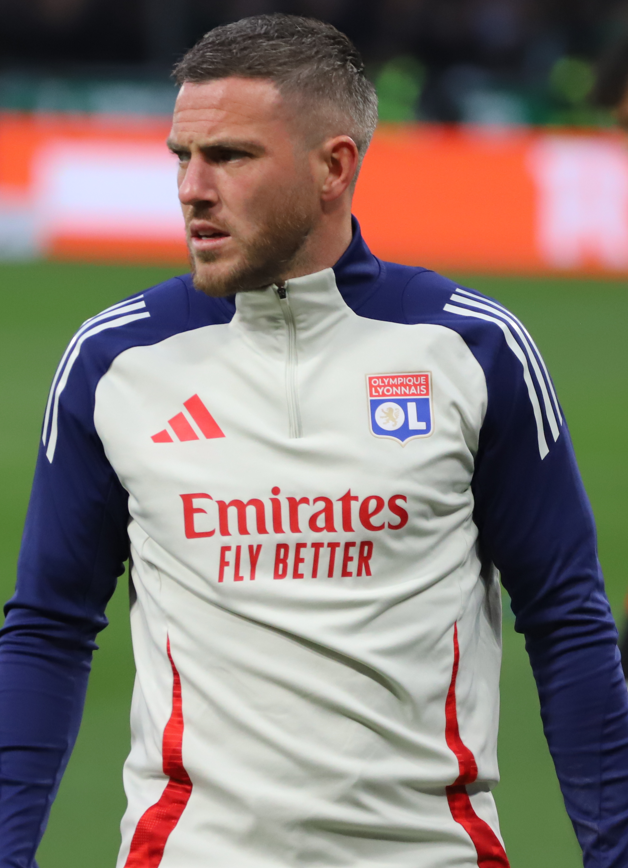
- Veretout with Lyon in 2025

Personal information
- Full name: Jordan Marcel Gilbert Veretout
- Date of birth: 1 March 1993 (age 33)
- Place of birth: Ancenis, Loire-Atlantique, France
- Height: 1.77 m (5 ft 10 in)
- Position: Midfielder

Team information
- Current team: Al-Arabi
- Number: 17

Youth career
- 1999–2003: Belligne
- 2003–2011: Nantes

Senior career*
Years	Team	Apps	(Gls)
2011–2015	Nantes	130	(14)
2015–2017	Aston Villa	25	(0)
2016–2017	→ Saint-Étienne (loan)	35	(3)
2017–2020	Fiorentina	69	(13)
2019–2020	→ Roma (loan)	33	(6)
2020–2022	Roma	65	(14)
2022–2024	Marseille	67	(5)
2024–2025	Lyon	27	(2)
2025–	Al-Arabi	22	(2)

International career
2010–2011	France U18	8	(2)
2011–2012	France U19	12	(1)
2012–2013	France U20	15	(2)
2013–2014	France U21	9	(0)
2021–2022	France	6	(0)
Medal record
Men's Football
Representing France
FIFA World Cup
Runner-up	2022 Qatar
UEFA Nations League
Winner	2021 Italy
FIFA U-20 World Cup
Winner	2013 Turkey
- * Club domestic league appearances and goals as of 17 January 2026

Jordan Marcel Gilbert Veretout (born 1 March 1993) is a French professional footballer who plays as a midfielder for Qatar Stars League club Al-Arabi.

Veretout is a former France youth international, having represented his nation regularly at under-18, under-19, under-20 and under-21 level. In 2013, he won the FIFA U-20 World Cup. In August 2021, he made his senior debut for the France national team, and won the UEFA Nations League months later, coming on as a substitute in the final. He was a member of the France squad that reached runners-up at the 2022 FIFA World Cup.

== Early life ==
Veretout was born in Ancenis, Loire-Atlantique.

== Club career ==
=== Nantes ===
Veretout made his first-team debut for French club Nantes on 13 May 2011 in a league match against Sedan. He made his first start the following season in the team's opening match of the campaign; a 1–0 extra time win over Reims in the Coupe de la Ligue. Veretout made 146 appearances for Nantes over five years.

=== Aston Villa ===
On 31 July 2015, Veretout joined Birmingham-based Premier League club Aston Villa on a five-year contract for an undisclosed fee, believed to be in the region of £7 million. Manager Tim Sherwood praised the player, saying, "I know Veretout is very highly rated over in France." Veretout made his debut for Aston Villa in a 1–0 victory against AFC Bournemouth on 8 August.

==== Loan to Saint-Étienne ====
On 23 August 2016, Veretout joined AS Saint-Étienne on loan for one year without an option to buy from Aston Villa.

=== Fiorentina ===
On 25 July 2017, Veretout moved to Fiorentina agreeing to a four-year contract with the option of a fifth year. The transfer fee paid to Aston Villa was reported as €7 million.

=== Roma ===
On 20 July 2019, Veretout joined Roma on loan with an obligation to buy. On 1 July 2020, Veretout joined on a permanent basis for an initial fee of €16 million, potentially rising to €18 million. He signed a four-year contract.

On 28 February 2021, Veretout scored his 10th Serie A goal of the 2020–21 season, in a match against AC Milan. Veretout became the first French midfielder to reach that milestone since Michel Platini for Juventus in 1985–86.

=== Marseille ===
On 5 August 2022, Veretout signed for Ligue 1 club Marseille on a three-year contract with an option for a further year. Marseille paid a transfer fee in the region of €11 million. He scored an important penalty to give his side a 3-1 victory over Greek side AEK Athens in 2023/24 Europa League Groupd Stage.

=== Lyon ===
On 4 September 2024, Veretout signed for fellow Ligue 1 club Lyon on a contract until 30 June 2026. Marseille received a transfer fee of €4 million, in addition to bonuses that could add up to €3 million, and a 25% sell-on clause. Lyon completed the transfer outside the regular transfer window dates thanks to the "joker" transfer exemption within France.

=== Al-Arabi SC ===
On 25 July 2025, Veretout left Lyon with a year remaining in his contract and signed for Qatar Stars League club Al-Arabi SC on a 2-year contract. Lyon received a fee of €500k with an agreement for 50% future sale incentive.

== International career ==
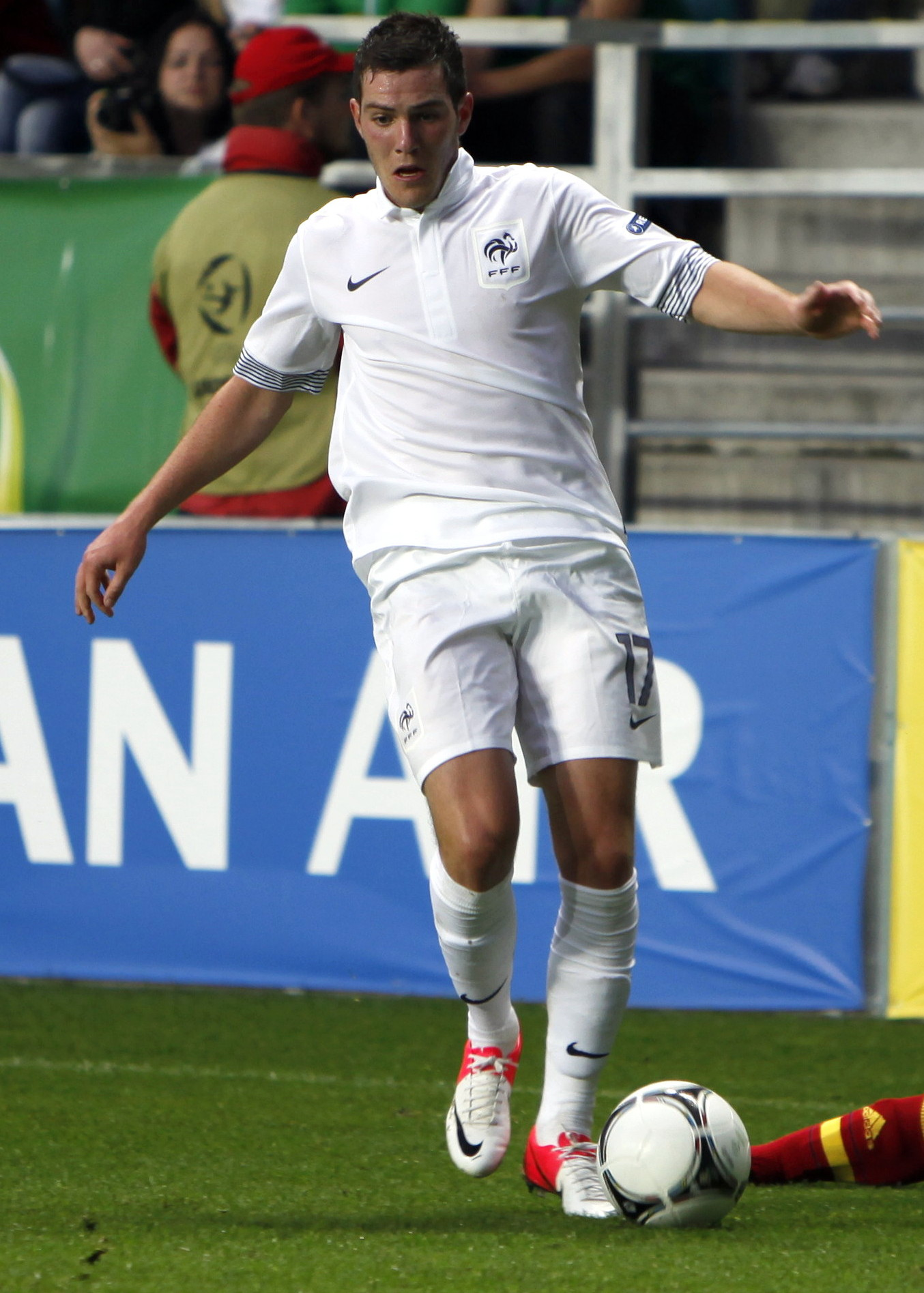
Veretout playing for France U19 in 2012

Veretout is a former France youth international, having represented his country from under-18 through to under-21 level. Veretout won the 2013 FIFA U-20 World Cup in Turkey, where he was highly praised for his performances in a midfield-three that also included Geoffrey Kondogbia and Paul Pogba. Veretout scored a penalty in the final, as France won the tournament through a shoot-out.

In August 2021, he received his first call-up to the France senior squad, for World Cup qualifiers against Bosnia and Herzegovina, Ukraine and Finland. With N'Golo Kanté unavailable through injury, Veretout made his debut in the first match, a 1–1 draw away to Bosnia and Herzegovina on 1 September. Veretout was a member of the final 26-man squad for the 2022 FIFA World Cup, and made one appearance, in the last group stage match against Tunisia.

== Career statistics ==
=== Club ===
As of match played 15 August 2025

Appearances and goals by club, season and competition
Club	Season	League			National cup (Note: Includes Coupe de France, Coupe de la Ligue, FA Cup, Football League Cup, Coppa Italia)		League cup (Note: Includes Coupe de la Ligue, Football League Cup)		Continental		Total	
Club	Season	Division	Apps	Goals	Apps	Goals	Apps	Goals	Apps	Goals	Apps	Goals
Nantes	2010–11	Ligue 2	1	0	0	0	0	0	—		1	0
Nantes	2011–12	Ligue 2	35	6	1	0	3	0	—		39	6
Nantes	2012–13	Ligue 2	31	0	1	0	1	1	—		33	1
Nantes	2013–14	Ligue 1	27	1	1	0	3	0	—		31	1
Nantes	2014–15	Ligue 1	36	7	3	0	1	0	—		40	7
Nantes	Total		130	14	6	0	8	1	—		144	15
Aston Villa	2015–16	Premier League	25	0	2	0	2	0	—		29	0
Saint-Étienne (loan)	2016–17	Ligue 1	35	3	1	1	0	0	7 (Note: Appearances in UEFA Europa League)	0	43	4
Fiorentina	2017–18	Serie A	36	8	2	2	—		—		38	10
Fiorentina	2018–19	Serie A	33	5	4	0	—		—		37	5
Fiorentina	Total		69	13	6	2	—		—		75	15
Roma (loan)	2019–20	Serie A	33	6	2	0	—		8	1	43	7
Roma	2020–21	Serie A	29	10	1	0	—		8	1	38	11
Roma	2021–22	Serie A	36	4	2	0	—		12 (Note: Appearances in UEFA Europa Conference League)	0	50	4
Roma	Total		98	20	5	0	—		28	2	131	22
Marseille	2022–23	Ligue 1	38	4	4	1	—		6 (Note: Appearances in UEFA Champions League)	0	48	5
Marseille	2023–24	Ligue 1	29	1	2	1	—		15 (Note: Two appearances in UEFA Champions League, thirteen appearances and three goals in UEFA Europa League)	3	46	5
Marseille	Total		67	5	6	2	—		21	3	94	8
Lyon	2024–25	Ligue 1	27	2	2	0	—		9	0	38	2
Al-Arabi	2025–26	Qatar Stars League	1	0	0	0	0	0	—		1	0
Career total			455	57	28	5	10	1	65	5	555	68

=== International ===
Appearances and goals by national team and year
National team	Year	Apps	Goals
France	2021	5	0
France	2022	1	0
Total		6	0

== Honours ==
Nantes

- Ligue 2: 2012–13

Roma

- UEFA Europa Conference League: 2021–22

France U20

- FIFA U-20 World Cup: 2013

France

- UEFA Nations League: 2020–21
- FIFA World Cup runner-up: 2022
