= Erik Sviatchenko =

Danish footballer (born 1991)

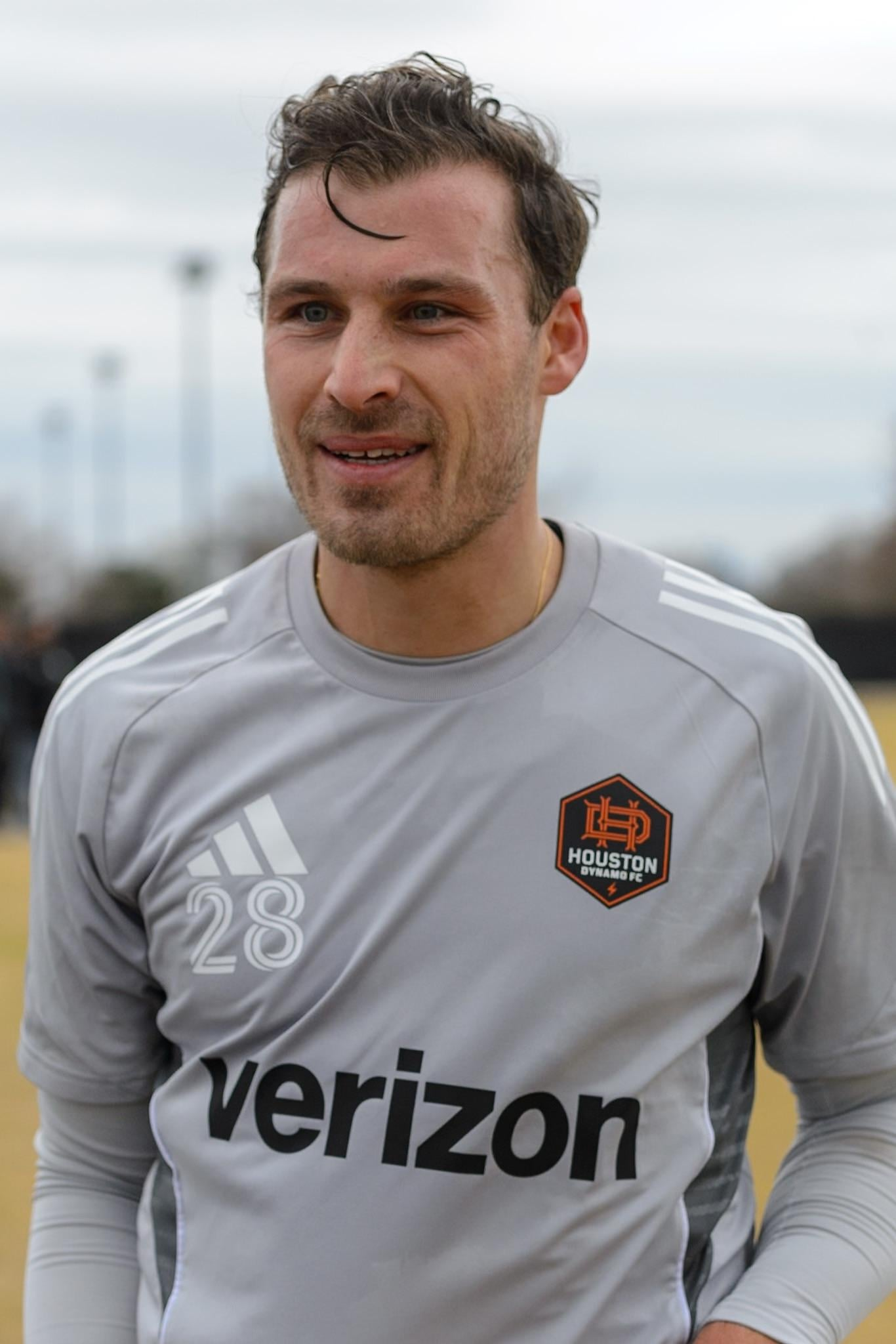
- Sviatchenko in 2025

Personal information
- Full name: Erik Sergiyovych Sviatchenko
- Date of birth: 4 October 1991 (age 35)
- Place of birth: Viborg, Denmark
- Height: 1.84 m (6 ft 0 in)
- Position: Centre-back

Team information
- Current team: Port

Youth career
- 1997–1998: Viborg FF
- 2001–2003: Houlkær IF
- 2003–2004: Søndermarken
- 2004–2006: FK Viborg
- 2006–2009: Midtjylland

Senior career*
Years	Team	Apps	(Gls)
2009–2016	Midtjylland	111	(10)
2016–2018	Celtic	42	(1)
2018	→ Midtjylland (loan)	16	(1)
2018–2023	Midtjylland	144	(15)
2023–2026	Houston Dynamo	73	(2)
2026–	Port	0	(0)

International career
2009	Denmark U18	2	(1)
2009–2010	Denmark U19	6	(0)
2010	Denmark U20	3	(0)
2010–2012	Denmark U21	8	(2)
2015–2016	Denmark	5	(1)
- * Club domestic league appearances and goals as of 13:57, 1 August 2026 (UTC)

Erik Sergiyovych Sviatchenko (Ukrainian: Ерік Сергійович Святченко; born 4 October 1991) is a Danish footballer who plays as a centre-back for Port.

== Club career ==
=== FC Midtjylland ===
Sviatchenko joined the FC Midtjylland academy in 2006 at the age of 14. Prior to that he had played for clubs around his hometown of Viborg: Viborg FF, Houlkær IF, Søndermarken IK, and FK Viborg. In 2009, he was named the Midtjylland Academy Player of the Year.

On 8 May 2009 Sviatchenko made his first team and Superliga debut, coming on as a substitute in a 3–2 win over AC Horsens. That was his only first team appearance during the 2008–09 season. He scored his first goal for Midtjylland on 14 April 2010 to give FCM a 1–0 win against AGF. He finished the 2009–10 campaign with 5 appearances and 1 goal for the first team.

The 2010–11 season saw Sviatchenko establish himself as a first team regular. He appeared in 13 of FCM's first 22 Superliga matches plus 2 Danish Cup matches. However, on 3 April 2011, Sviatchenko tore the cruciate ligament in his right knee after colliding with teammate Rilwan Hassan during training. The injury ended his season and kept him out for 11 months. FCM would finish the season 4th in the Superliga.

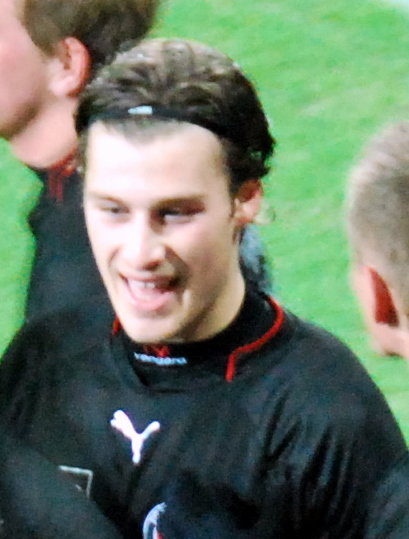
Sviatchenko in March 2012

On 4 March 2012, Sviatchenko made his return from injury, getting the start and playing 90 minutes in a 2–1 loss to Lyngby. The following week he scored in a 4–1 win over Horsens. Sviatchenko ended the 2011–12 season by playing every minute of the final 15 games of the season, helping Midtjylland to a 3rd-place finish.

On 23 August 2012, Sviatchenko made his debut in a continental competition, losing 3–0 to Swiss side BSC Young Boys in a Europa League qualifier. Midtjylland and Sviatchenko would win the 2nd leg 2–0 but be eliminated 3–2 on aggregate. On 20 May 2013 Sviatchenko scored in the 90th minute to give FCM a 3–2 win against AGF. He ended the season with 28 appearances and scored 2 goals in the Superliga as FCM finished 6th table, plus 2 appearances each in the Cup and Europa League.

Prior to the 2013–14 season, Sviatchenko was made vice-captain. On 2 March 2014 Sviatchenko scored the opening goal in a 5–1 win over Copenhagen. During the match he sprained his ankle. He was able to finish the game but underwent ankle surgery a month later and missed the rest of the season. Sviatchenko ended the season with 17 appearances and 3 goals in the league. At the time of his injury Midtjylland were top of the table with a 5-point gap, but with Sviatchenko out injured they finished 3rd, 7 points behind champions Aalborg.

After missing the first 3 weeks of the 2014–15 season due to his ankle, Svaitchenko made his season debut on 10 August 2014, coming on as a late sub in 3–1 win over Sønderjyske Fodbold. He played in 6 games before a thigh injury forced him to miss the rest of 2014. He returned on 23 February 2015, scoring a goal in a 3–0 win over Odense Boldklub in the first match of 2015. Sviatchenko finished the season with 19 appearances and 1 goal in league play, helping Midtjylland finish top of the table and win their first Superliga title in club history.

On 4 August 2015 Sviatchenko scored his first career goal in a continental competition to give Midtjylland a 1–0 win at APOEL in a Champions League qualifier. However FCM lost 2–1 at home and were eliminated on away goals. In the Europa League playoffs, Sviatchenko helped Midtjylland beat Southampton 2–1 on aggregate to reach the Europa League group stage for the first time in club history. He played every minute of the group stage to help FCM finish 2nd and advance to the Round of 32. Sviatchenko wore the captain's armband regularly during the season due to captain Kristian Bach Bak being injured for most of the season. He made 13 appearances and scored 2 goals in the Superliga prior to being sold.

=== Celtic ===
On 17 January 2016, Sviatchenko signed with Scottish Premiership club Celtic on a four-and-a-half-year contract, with the transfer fee worth a reported £1.5 million. He made his Celtic debut on 31 January in a 3–1 loss to Ross County in the League Cup semifinals, coming off the bench after 13 minutes following a red card to Efe Ambrose. Sviatchenko picked up his first goal for the Hoops on 17 April, scoring in a 2–2 draw with Old Firm rivals Rangers in the Scottish Cup semifinals, with Rangers advancing on penalties. He appeared in 14 Premiership games to help Celtic win their 5th straight league title.

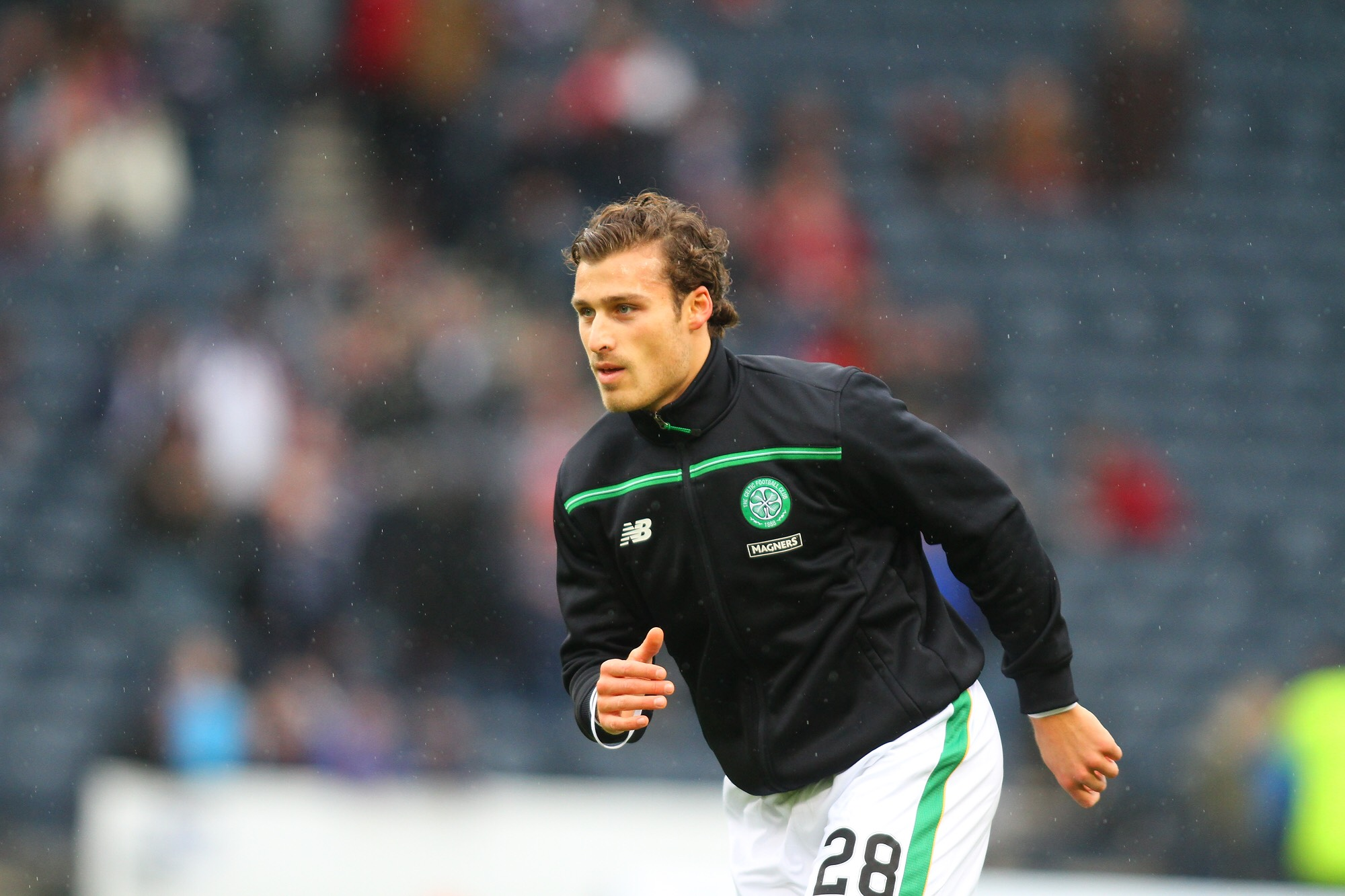
Sviatchenko in January 2016

During the 2016–17 season, Sviatchenko made 28 appearances and scored a goal in league play to help the Hoops win their 6th straight Premiership title. He also made 3 appearances in the Cup and 3 in the League Cup as Celtic won both to complete the domestic treble and finish the season unbeaten domestically.

On 2 August 2017 Sviatchenko damaged his knee ligaments in 1–0 win versus Rosenborg in a UEFA Champions League qualifier against Rosenborg, which prevented him from playing for three months. He returned to training in November and made the bench a couple of times, but did not make another appearance for Celtic.

=== Return to FC Midtjylland ===
On 16 January 2018, Sviatchenko returned to FC Midtjylland on loan until the end of the 2017–18 season. He made his first appearance in 7 months on 9 February, playing 90 minutes in a 2–0 win over AC Horsens. Sviatchenko scored 1 goal and played in 16 of the 17 possible league games during the loan, helping Midtjylland win their 2nd Superliga title in club history. That loan move was made permanent on 27 May 2018 for a fee of £1m and Sviatchenko agreeing to a four-year contract.

During the 2018–19 season Sviatchenko made 27 appearances and scored 1 goal in league play as FCM were unable to defend their title, finishing 2nd in the table, 11 points behind Copenhagen. In the cup, Sviatchenko made 4 appearances and scored once to help Midtjylland win their first Danish Cup title in club history.

Sviatchenko became club captain during the 2019–20 season, with the previous captain Jakob Poulsen departing the club. On 18 August 2019, Sviatchenko scored in the 90th minute to rescue a draw with Hobro IK. He finished the season with 6 goals and 32 appearances, anchoring a defense that allowed a league best 29 goals all season to lead Midtjylland to a Superliga title. Following the season he was named Superliga Player of the Year. On 12 June, Sviatchenko agreed to a contract extension until June 2024.

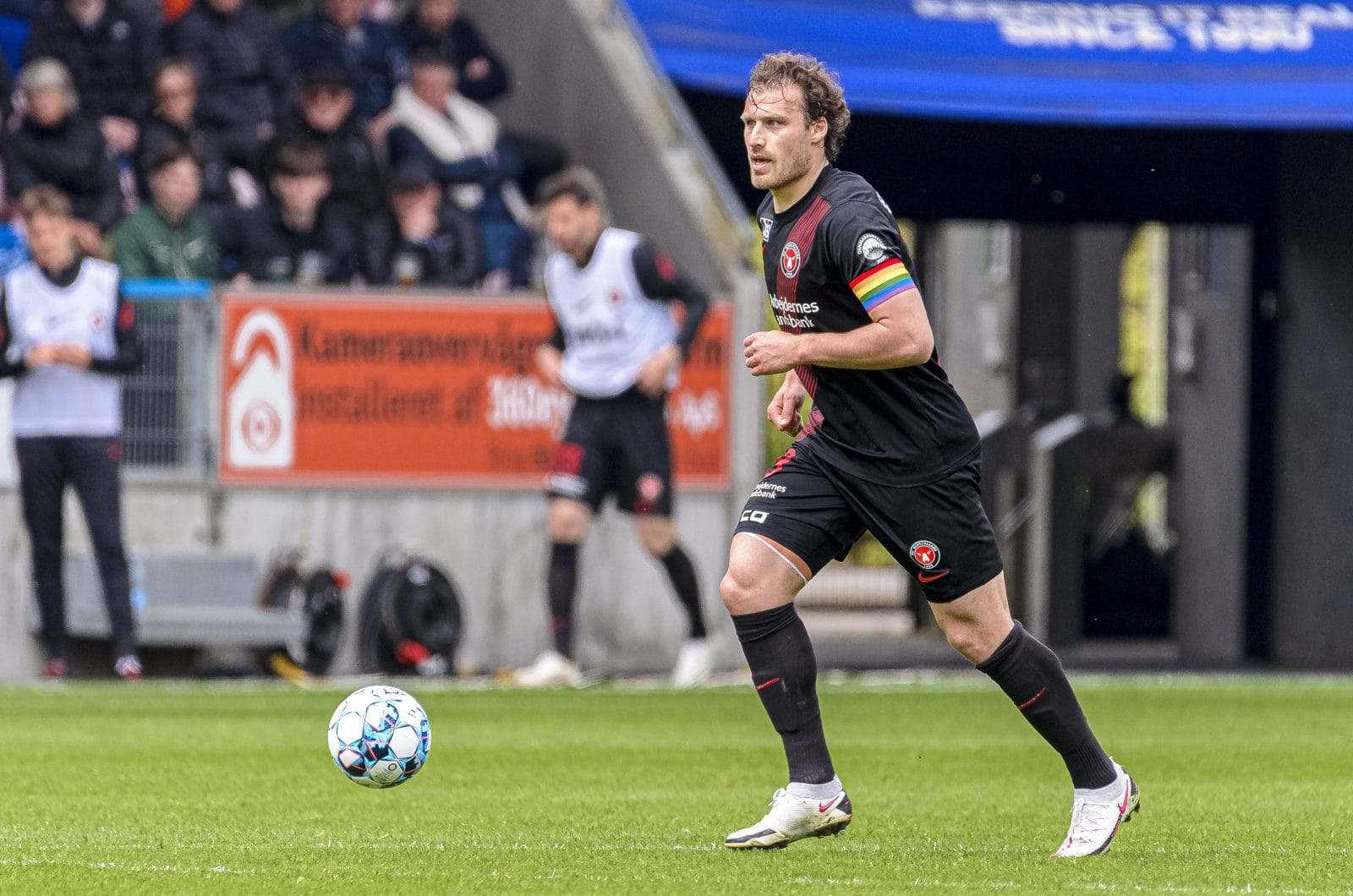
Sviatchenko in a match in January 2021

During the 2020–21 season, Midtjylland reached the Champions League group stage for the first time in club history, with Sviatchenko appearing in 5 of the 6 group games as FCM finished bottom of the group. On 24 October he scored in the 90+4th minute to give Midtjylland a 3–2 win over Brøndby. Sviatchenko ended the Superliga season with 28 appearances and 3 goals, helping FCM have the fewest goals allowed for the second straight year. They were unable to repeat as champions though, finishing 1 point behind Brøndby.

Sviatchenko made 25 appearances and scored 4 goals in the Superliga during the 2021–22 season as FCM finished second, three points behind champions Copenhagen. Sviatchenko helped Midtjylland win their second ever Danish Cup, making 4 appearances and scoring 1 goal during the tournament.

Sviatchenko made 26 appearances and scored 3 goals across all competitions in the 2022–23 season prior to being sold. His 325 total games for Midtjylland are the second most in club history.

=== Houston Dynamo ===
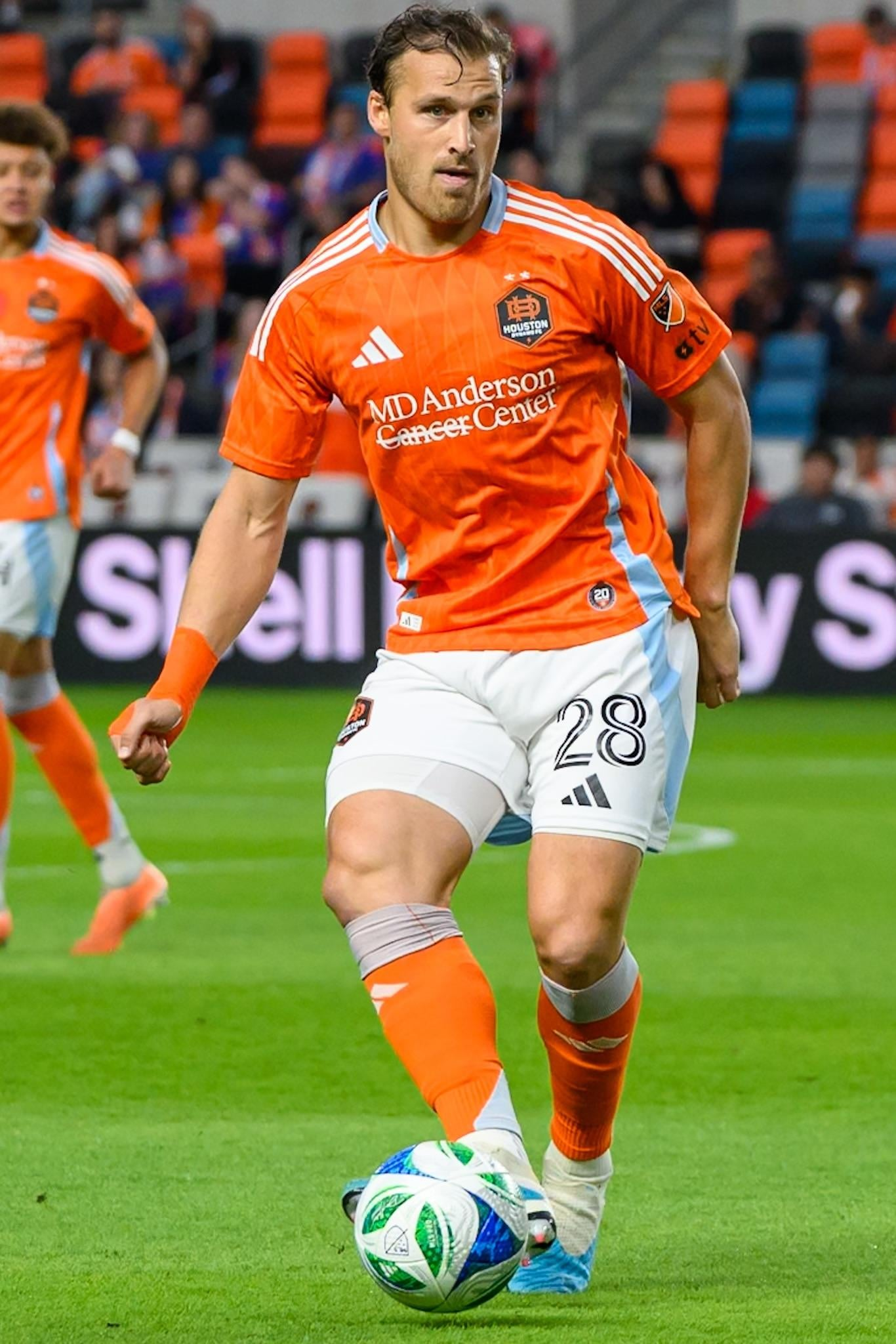
Sviatchenko in April 2025

On 24 March 2023, Sviatchenko was sold to American MLS side Houston Dynamo, signing a two-year contract with a club option for 2025. The official transfer fee was undisclosed, but was reportedly just over 10 million Danish krone/1.48 million U.S. dollars.

== International career ==
Due to his dual citizenship, Sviatchenko was eligible to play for Ukraine, but agreed to a call-up for the Danish national team in March 2015. He made his international debut on 25 March 2015 at NRGi Arena in Aarhus, starting against the United States in a 3–2 friendly win, in central defence alongside Simon Kjær. He scored his first international goal on 11 October 2015 in a 2–1 friendly loss to France.

== Personal life ==
Erik Sviatchenko was born in Viborg, Denmark to Sergei and Helena Sviatchenko 4 October 1991. His parents moved to Denmark from Ukraine with Erik's older brother, Phillip, in 1990. Erik also has a twin sister, Alexandra. Erik is a Christian.

Sviatchenko's wife, Anne Sviatchenko (née Rudmose), is a former professional footballer and has played for Team Viborg, Skovbakken IK, ASA, Celtic and the Denmark national team. Erik and Anne met when they were 14 through his sister Alexandra. Anne signed for the Celtic women's team in February 2016, one month after Sviatchenko had joined the men's team. They were married in June 2017 in Viborg, and have two children together.

== Career statistics ==
=== Club ===
As of match played 26 July 2026

Appearances and goals by club, season and competition
Club	Season	League			National Cup (Note: Includes Danish Cup, Scottish Cup, and the U.S. Open Cup)		League Cup (Note: Includes Scottish League Cup)		Continental		Other		Total	
Club	Season	Division	Apps	Goals	Apps	Goals	Apps	Goals	Apps	Goals	Apps	Goals	Apps	Goals
Midtjylland	2008–09	Danish Superliga	1	0	0	0	—		0	0	—		1	0
Midtjylland	2009–10	Danish Superliga	5	1	0	0	—		—		—		5	1
Midtjylland	2010–11	Danish Superliga	13	0	2	0	—		—		—		15	0
Midtjylland	2011–12	Danish Superliga	15	1	0	0	—		0	0	—		15	1
Midtjylland	2012–13	Danish Superliga	28	2	2	0	—		2 (Note: Appearance(s) in UEFA Europa League)	0	—		32	2
Midtjylland	2013–14	Danish Superliga	17	3	1	0	—		—		—		18	3
Midtjylland	2014–15	Danish Superliga	19	1	0	0	—		1	0	—		20	1
Midtjylland	2015–16	Danish Superliga	13	2	0	0	—		12 (Note: Four appearances and one goal in UEFA Champions League, eight appearances in UEFA Europa League)	1	—		25	3
Midtjylland	Total		111	10	5	0	—		15	1	—		131	11
Celtic	2015–16	Scottish Premiership	14	0	3	1	1	0	0	0	—		18	1
Celtic	2016–17	Scottish Premiership	28	1	3	0	3	0	9 (Note: Appearances in UEFA Champions League)	0	—		43	1
Celtic	2017–18	Scottish Premiership	0	0	0	0	0	0	2	0	—		2	0
Celtic	Total		42	1	6	1	4	0	11	0	—		63	2
Midtjylland (loan)	2017–18	Danish Superliga	16	1	1	0	—		0	0	—		17	1
Midtjylland	2018–19	Danish Superliga	27	1	4	1	—		2	0	—		33	2
Midtjylland	2019–20	Danish Superliga	32	6	0	0	—		2	0	—		34	6
Midtjylland	2020–21	Danish Superliga	28	3	4	0	—		9	0	—		41	3
Midtjylland	2021–22	Danish Superliga	25	4	5	1	—		11 (Note: Three appearances in UEFA Champions League, six appearances and one goal in UEFA Europa League, two appearances in UEFA Europa Conference League)	1	—		41	6
Midtjylland	2022–23	Danish Superliga	16	0	1	0	—		9 (Note: Three appearances in and one goal in UEFA Champions League, six appearances and two goals in UEFA Europa League)	3	—		26	3
Midtjylland	Total		144	15	15	2	—		33	4	—		192	21
Houston Dynamo	2023	Major League Soccer	22	0	4	0	—		—		9 (Note: Four appearances in Leagues Cup, five appearances in MLS Cup playoffs)	0	35	0
Houston Dynamo	2024	Major League Soccer	33	1	1	0	—		3 (Note: Appearances in CONCACAF Champions Cup)	1	3 (Note: Appearances in Leagues Cup)	0	40	2
Houston Dynamo	2025	Major League Soccer	15	0	0	0	—		—		—		15	0
Houston Dynamo	2026	Major League Soccer	10	1	1	1	—		—		—		11	2
Houston Dynamo	Total		80	2	6	1	—		3	1	12	0	101	4
Career total			393	29	33	4	4	0	62	6	12	0	504	39

=== International ===
Appearances and goals by national team and year
National team	Year	Apps	Goals
Denmark	2015	4	1
Denmark	2016	1	0
Total		5	1

Denmark's score listed first, score column indicates score after each Sviatchenko goal

List of international goals scored by Erik Sviatchenko
No.	Date	Venue	Opponent	Score	Result	Competition	Ref.
1	11 October 2015	Parken, Copenhagen, Denmark	France	1–2	1–2	Friendly	

== Honours ==
Midtjylland

- Danish Superliga (3): 2014–15, 2017–18, 2019–20
- Danish Cup (2): 2018–19, 2021–22

Celtic

- Scottish Premiership (2): 2015–16, 2016–17
- Scottish Cup (1): 2016–17
- Scottish League Cup (2): 2016–17, 2017–18

Houston Dynamo

- U.S. Open Cup (1): 2023

Individual

- Tipsbladet Player of the Fall: 2019
- Tipsbladet Player of the Spring: 2020
- Danish Superliga Player of the Year: 2019–20

Sporting positions
Preceded by Jakob Poulsen	FC Midtjylland captain 2019–2023	Succeeded by Jonas Lössl
