= Rasmus Nicolaisen =

Danish footballer (born 1997)

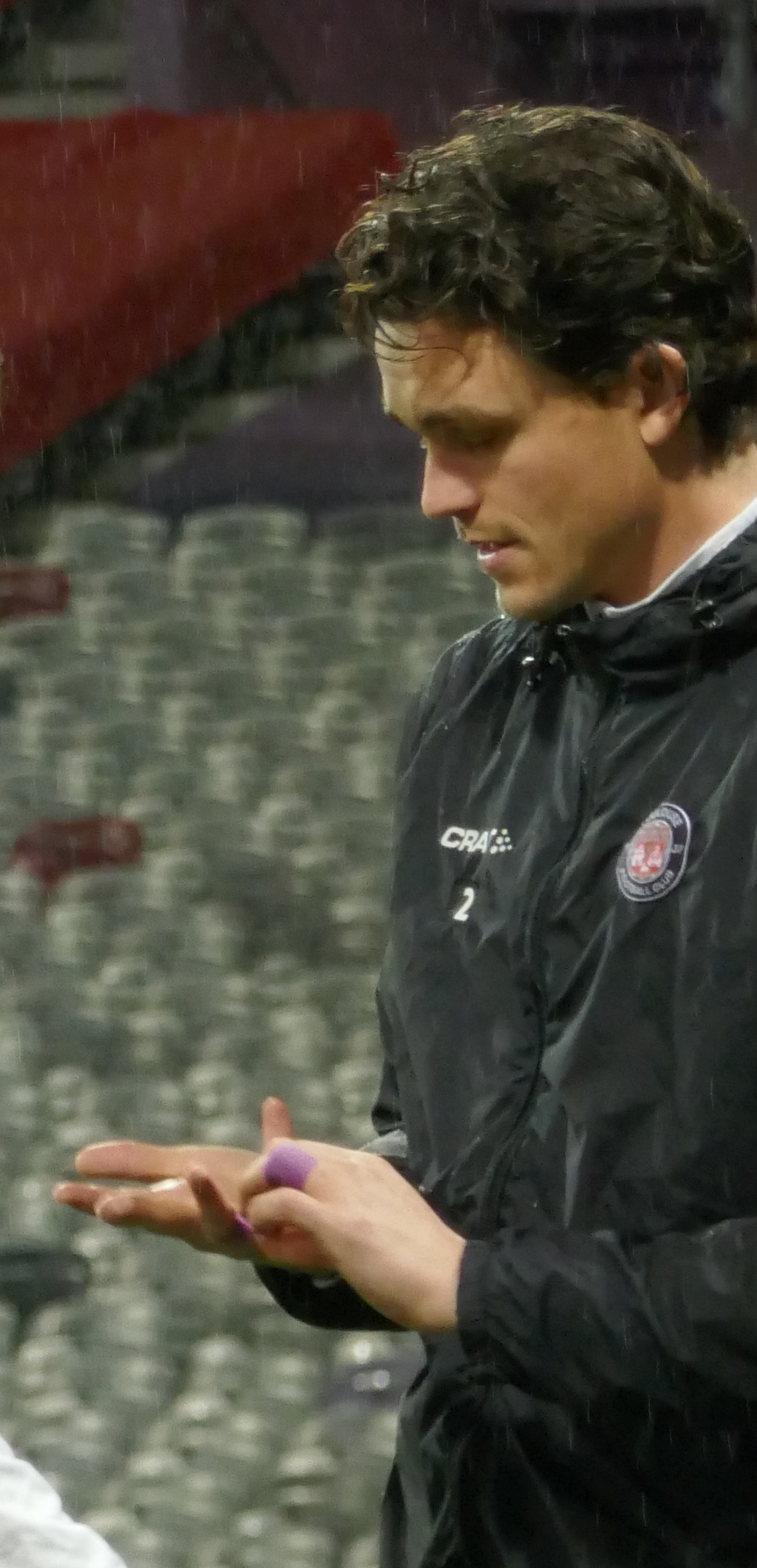
- Nicolaisen in 2022

Personal information
- Full name: Rasmus Schmidt Nicolaisen
- Date of birth: 16 March 1997 (age 29)
- Place of birth: Aulum, Denmark
- Height: 1.91 m (6 ft 3 in)
- Position: Centre-back

Team information
- Current team: Toulouse
- Number: 2

Youth career
- Aulum IF
- Midtjylland

Senior career*
| Years | Team | Apps | (Gls) |
| 2017–2021 | Midtjylland | 46 | (6) |
| 2020–2021 | → Portsmouth (loan) | 21 | (0) |
| 2021– | Toulouse | 139 | (7) |

International career
| 2013 | Denmark U16 | 2 | (0) |
| 2013 | Denmark U17 | 1 | (0) |
| 2015 | Denmark U18 | 2 | (1) |
| 2015 | Denmark U19 | 4 | (0) |
- * Club domestic league appearances and goals as of 19 May 2026

Rasmus Schmidt Nicolaisen (born 16 March 1997) is a Danish professional footballer who plays as a centre-back for Ligue 1 club Toulouse.

== Club career ==
Born in Aulum, Denmark, Nicolaisen came through the academy of FC Midtjylland. He made his first professional appearance with the club on 7 March 2017 in a Danish Cup game against Kjellerup IF, coming off the bench to replace Kian Hansen in a 3–0 win.

On 16 April 2017, Nicolaisen made his Superliga debut against Lyngby BK, once again replacing Hansen, this time in a 2–2 draw. He scored his first professional goal on 1 June 2017 during a 3–0 win against Randers FC.

On 23 September 2020, Nicolaisen joined EFL League One club Portsmouth on a season-long loan deal. He scored his first goal for Portsmouth in a 6–1 FA Cup win against King's Lynn Town on 28 November 2020.

In the 2021–22 season, Nicolaisen helped Toulouse achieve promotion to Ligue 1 by winning Ligue 2. Nicolaisen and Toulouse won the Coupe de France the following season.

On 29 March 2024, Nicolaisen signed a contract extension with Toulouse, reported as lasting until at least 2026.

== International career ==
Nicolaisen has represented Denmark up to under-19 level.

He was one of the players who were called-up with the Denmark national team by head coach Brian Riemer for the UEFA Nations League matches against Portugal and Norway on 14 and 17 November 2026, respectively.

== Career statistics ==
As of match played 13 December 2025

Appearances and goals by club, season and competition
| Club | Season | League | | | National cup (Note: Includes Danish Cup, FA Cup and Coupe de France) | | League cup (Note: Includes EFL Cup) | | Continental | | Other | | Total | |
| Club | Season | Division | Apps | Goals | Apps | Goals | Apps | Goals | Apps | Goals | Apps | Goals | Apps | Goals |
|---|---|---|---|---|---|---|---|---|---|---|---|---|---|---|
| Midtjylland | 2016–17 | Danish Superliga | 8 | 1 | 1 | 0 | — | | 0 | 0 | — | | 9 | 1 |
| Midtjylland | 2017–18 | Danish Superliga | 2 | 0 | 0 | 0 | — | | 0 | 0 | — | | 2 | 0 |
| Midtjylland | 2018–19 | Danish Superliga | 17 | 4 | 1 | 0 | — | | 2 (Note: Appearance(s) in UEFA Europa League) | 0 | — | | 20 | 4 |
| Midtjylland | 2019–20 | Danish Superliga | 16 | 1 | 1 | 0 | — | | 2 | 0 | — | | 19 | 1 |
| Midtjylland | 2020–21 | Danish Superliga | 0 | 0 | 0 | 0 | — | | 0 | 0 | — | | 0 | 0 |
| Midtjylland | 2021–22 | Danish Superliga | 3 | 0 | 0 | 0 | — | | 3 (Note: Appearance(s) in UEFA Champions League) | 0 | — | | 6 | 0 |
| Midtjylland | Total | | 46 | 6 | 3 | 0 | — | | 7 | 0 | — | | 56 | 6 |
| Portsmouth (loan) | 2020–21 | League One | 21 | 0 | 3 | 1 | 0 | 0 | — | | 3 (Note: Appearance(s) in EFL Trophy) | 0 | 27 | 1 |
| Toulouse | 2021–22 | Ligue 2 | 32 | 4 | 3 | 0 | — | | — | | — | | 35 | 4 |
| Toulouse | 2022–23 | Ligue 1 | 34 | 0 | 5 | 0 | — | | — | | — | | 39 | 0 |
| Toulouse | 2023–24 | Ligue 1 | 33 | 2 | 1 | 1 | — | | 8 | 0 | 1 (Note: Appearance(s) in Trophée des Champions) | 0 | 43 | 3 |
| Toulouse | 2024–25 | Ligue 1 | 7 | 0 | 1 | 0 | — | | — | | — | | 8 | 0 |
| Toulouse | 2025–26 | Ligue 1 | 16 | 0 | 0 | 0 | — | | — | | — | | 16 | 0 |
| Toulouse | Total | | 122 | 6 | 10 | 1 | — | | 8 | 0 | 1 | 0 | 141 | 7 |
| Career total | | | 189 | 12 | 16 | 2 | 0 | 0 | 15 | 0 | 4 | 0 | 224 | 14 |

== Honours ==
Midtjylland

- Danish Superliga: 2019–20
- Danish Cup: 2018–19

Portsmouth

- EFL Trophy runner-up: 2019–20

Toulouse

- Ligue 2: 2021–22
- Coupe de France: 2022–23

Individual

- UNFP Ligue 2 Team of the Year: 2021–22
