= Kian Hansen =

Danish footballer (born 1989)

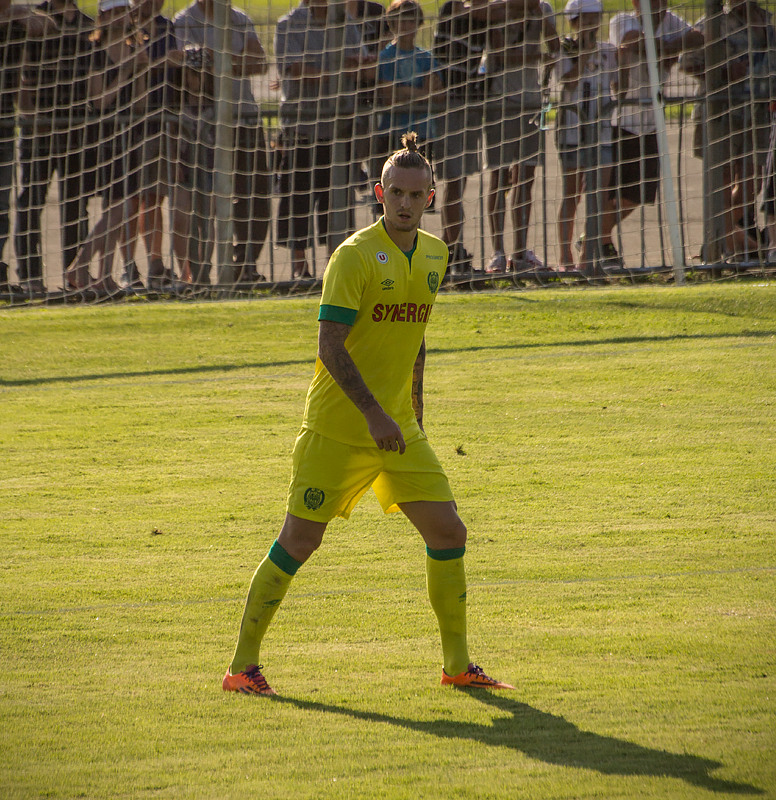
- Hansen playing for FC Nantes in 2014

Personal information
- Full name: Kian H. Hansen
- Date of birth: 3 March 1989 (age 37)
- Place of birth: Grindsted, Denmark
- Height: 1.84 m (6 ft 0 in)
- Position: Centre-back

Team information
- Current team: Nordsjælland U19 (assistant)

Youth career
- Grindsted
- Esbjerg fB

Senior career*
Years	Team	Apps	(Gls)
2008–2014	Esbjerg fB	101	(0)
2014–2015	Nantes	29	(0)
2014	→ Esbjerg fB (loan)	13	(0)
2015–2019	Midtjylland	117	(4)
2019–2025	Nordsjælland	152	(5)
Total		412	(9)

International career
2008	Denmark U-19	1	(0)
2013–2015	Denmark	2	(0)

Managerial career
- 2025–: Nordsjælland U19 (assistant)
- * Club domestic league appearances and goals

Kian H. Hansen (born 3 March 1989) is a Danish professional footballer who plays as a centre-back and current assistant coach of FC Nordsjælland's U19s.

== Club career ==
Hansen has played for Esbjerg the most part of his career, having been promoted to the first team in 2008. Following injury problems for Esbjerg's then captain Nicolai Høgh during the 2012–13 season, Hansen established himself as a regular starter.

He made his Ligue 1 debut for Nantes on 9 August 2014 against RC Lens.

On 19 July 2019, FC Nordsjælland confirmed, that they had signed Hansen. In July 2025, 36-year old Hansen announced his retirement from football. However, he continued at the club in a role as assistant coach for the U19 team.

== International career ==
Hansen's good form for Esbjerg in the spring of 2013 earned him a call up for the Danish National Team for a friendly against Georgia.

== Career statistics ==
=== Club ===
Appearances and goals by club, season and competition
Club	Season	League			National cup		League Cup		Europe		Total	
Club	Season	Division	Apps	Goals	Apps	Goals	Apps	Goals	Apps	Goals	Apps	Goals
Esbjerg	2008–09	Danish Superliga	4	0	0	0	—		—		4	0
Esbjerg	2010–11	Danish Superliga	19	0	3	0	—		—		22	0
Esbjerg	2011–12	Danish 1st Division	22	0	1	0	—		—		23	0
Esbjerg	2012–13	Danish Superliga	29	0	5	0	—		—		34	0
Esbjerg	2013–14	Danish Superliga	27	0	0	0	—		8 (Note: Appearances in UEFA Europa League)	0	35	0
Esbjerg	Total		101	0	9	0	—		8	0	118	0
Nantes	2014–15	Ligue 1	29	0	0	0	0	0	—		29	0
Esbjerg (loan)	2014–15	Danish Superliga	13	0	1	0	—		—		14	0
Midtjylland	2015–16	Danish Superliga	28	0	1	0	—		14 (Note: Ten appearances in UEFA Europa League and four appearances in UEFA Champions League)	0	43	0
Midtjylland	2016–17	Danish Superliga	30	2	2	0	—		8	0	40	2
Midtjylland	2017–18	Danish Superliga	31	1	3	0	—		7	0	41	1
Midtjylland	2018–19	Danish Superliga	27	1	3	1	—		6 (Note: Two appearances in UEFA Champions League, four appearances in UEFA Europa League)	0	36	2
Midtjylland	2019–20	Danish Superliga	1	0	0	0	—		0	0	1	0
Midtjylland	Total		117	4	9	1	—		35	0	161	5
Nordsjælland	2019–20	Danish Superliga	30	2	2	0	—		—		32	2
Nordsjælland	2020–21	Danish Superliga	15	0	1	0	—		—		16	0
Nordsjælland	2021–22	Danish Superliga	26	2	0	0	—		—		26	2
Nordsjælland	2022–23	Danish Superliga	31	0	4	0	—		—		35	0
Nordsjælland	2023–24	Danish Superliga	28	1	4	0	—		8 (Note: Appearances in UEFA Europa Conference League)	0	40	1
Nordsjælland	2024–25	Danish Superliga	16	0	1	0	—		—		17	0
Nordsjælland	2025–26	Danish Superliga	5	0	0	0	—		—		5	0
Nordsjælland	Total		151	5	12	0	—		8	0	171	5
Career total			411	9	31	1	0	0	51	0	493	10

=== International ===
Appearances and goals by national team and year
National team	Year	Apps	Goals
Denmark	2014	1	0
Denmark	2015	1	0
Total		2	0

== Honours ==
Esbjerg fB

- Danish Cup: 2012–13

FC Midtjylland

- Danish Cup: 2018–19
