= Issa Cissokho (footballer) =

Senegalese footballer (born 1985)

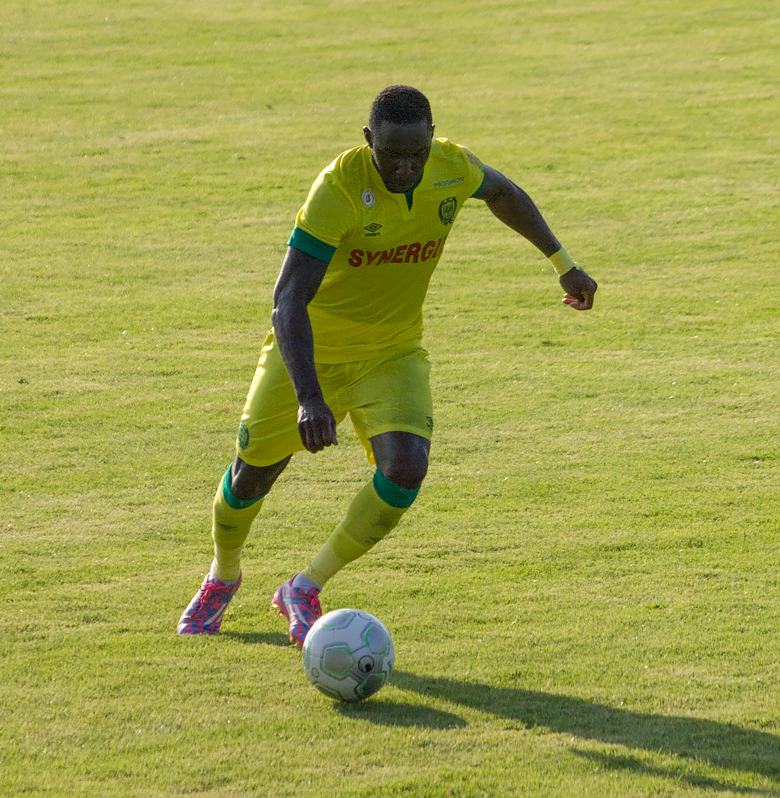
- Cissokho with Nantes in July 2014

Personal information
- Full name: Issa Cissokho
- Date of birth: 23 February 1985 (age 41)
- Place of birth: Paris, France
- Height: 1.71 m (5 ft 7 in)
- Position: Right back

Team information
- Current team: Landreau Loroux OSC

Youth career
- 2000–2003: Louhans-Cuiseaux
- 2003–2006: Guingamp

Senior career*
Years	Team	Apps	(Gls)
2002–2003	Louhans-Cuiseaux	3	(0)
2006–2007	Orléans	2	(0)
2007–2008	Blois		
2008–2010	Carquefou	55	(4)
2010–2015	Nantes	135	(2)
2015–2017	Genoa	13	(0)
2016	→ Bari (loan)	5	(0)
2017	Angers	13	(0)
2017–2018	Amiens	19	(0)
2018–2019	Maccabi Petah Tikva	22	(1)
2020	Cholet	5	(0)
2021–	Landreau		

International career
2013–2015	Senegal	3	(0)
- * Club domestic league appearances and goals as of 18:23, 20 April 2020 (UTC)

Issa Cissokho (born 23 February 1985) is a professional footballer who plays as a right back. He is the older brother of former Aston Villa and French international defender Aly Cissokho. Born in Paris, France, Cissokho played for the Senegal national football team.

Cissokho has spent most of his professional career in France, apart from spells with Italian club Genoa and Israeli club Maccabi Petah Tikva.

== Career ==
Cissokho began his career playing for Louhans-Cuiseaux and made his professional debut with the club at the age of 17 in the 2002–03 Championnat National season. After the season, he signed with Guingamp and spent his entire career at the club playing on its reserve team. After two years playing for amateurs clubs Orléans and Blois, respectively, Cissokho joined Carquefou in the Championnat de France amateur 2, the fifth level of French football. In his first season at the club, he helped the team achieve promotion to the Championnat de France amateur.

After another season with Carquefou, in June 2010, Cissokho signed an amateur contract with professional club Nantes. After spending the majority of the 2010–11 season playing on the club's reserve team, in April 2011, Cissokho was called up to the senior team and made his club debut on 15 April in a league match against Dijon. In the following match, he scored his first professional goal in a 2–2 draw with Nîmes.

In October 2018 he signed for Maccabi Petah Tikva. He left the club at the end of the contract, and was without a club until returning to France with SO Cholet in January 2020. After making five appearances, he was released at the end of the season.
