= Rémi Gomis =

Footballer (born 1984)

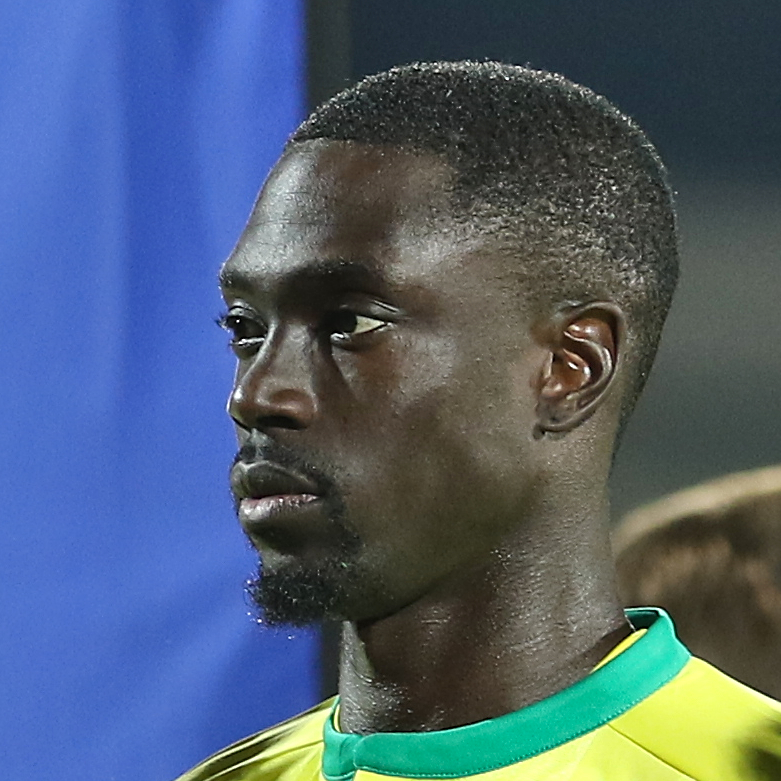
- Gomis with Nantes in 2015

Personal information
- Date of birth: 14 February 1984 (age 42)
- Place of birth: Versailles, France
- Height: 1.80 m (5 ft 11 in)
- Position: Midfielder

Senior career*
Years	Team	Apps	(Gls)
2001–2007	Laval	136	(5)
2007–2009	Caen	53	(3)
2009–2013	Valenciennes	121	(5)
2013–2014	Levante	0	(0)
2014–2016	Nantes	46	(0)
2014–2015	→ Nantes B	5	(0)
2016–2017	FC Wil	8	(0)
Total		369	(13)

International career
2008–2012	Senegal	15	(0)
- * Club domestic league appearances and goals

Rémi Gomis (born 14 February 1984) is a former professional footballer who played as a midfielder. Born in France, he played for the Senegal national team.

== Club career ==
Gomis began his career with Stade Lavallois and signed for Stade Malherbe Caen in summer 2007. On 13 July 2009, he moved to Valenciennes FC on a four-year contract after two years with Caen. He went to Spanish club Levante UD in summer 2013, but six months after that he broke the contract and left Levante returning to the Ligue 1, joining FC Nantes. In August 2016, he moved to Swiss club FC Wil.

== International career ==
Gomis played his first match with Senegal in 2008.
