= Alioun Fall =

French professional footballer (born 1990)

Personal information
- Date of birth: 20 December 1990 (age 35)
- Place of birth: Ollioules, France
- Height: 1.70 m (5 ft 7 in)
- Position: Defender

Team information
- Current team: Olympique de Genève

Youth career
- 2010–2012: Dijon

Senior career*
Years	Team	Apps	(Gls)
2012–2015	Evian B	50	(0)
2014–2016	Evian	18	(0)
2016–2017	Ajaccio	10	(0)
2018–2021	Toulon	49	(0)
2021–2022	Engordany	17	(0)
2022–2023	Furiani-Agliani	17	(0)
2024–	Olympique de Genève	7	(0)
- * Club domestic league appearances and goals as of 24 April 2024

Alioun Fall (born 20 December 1990) is a French professional footballer who plays as a defender for 2. Liga Interregional club Olympique de Genève.

== Career ==
In August 2016, Fall joined Ajaccio.

== Personal life ==
Born in France, Fall is of Senegalese descent.

== Career statistics ==
As of match played 24 April 2022

Appearances and goals by club, season and competition
Club	Season	League			National Cup		League Cup		Other		Total	
Club	Season	Division	Apps	Goals	Apps	Goals	Apps	Goals	Apps	Goals	Apps	Goals
Evian	2014–15	Ligue 1	8	0	0	0	0	0	—		8	0
Evian	2015–16	Ligue 2	10	0	1	0	0	0	—		11	0
Evian	Total		18	0	1	0	0	0	—		19	0
Ajaccio	2016–17	Ligue 2	10	0	1	0	0	0	—		11	0
Toulon	2017–18	National 2	14	0	0	0	0	0	—		14	0
Toulon	2018–19	National 2	17	0	1	0	0	0	—		18	0
Toulon	2019–20	National	17	0	0	0	0	0	—		17	0
Toulon	2020–21	National	1	0	0	0	0	0	—		1	0
Toulon	Total		49	0	1	0	0	0	—		50	0
Engordany	2021–22	Primera Divisió	16	0	3	0	—		0	0	19	0
Career total			93	0	6	0	0	0	0	0	99	0
