= Mathias Haarup =

Danish footballer (born 1996)

Personal information
- Full name: Mathias Haarup
- Date of birth: 10 February 1996 (age 30)
- Place of birth: Havndal, Denmark
- Height: 1.78 m (5 ft 10 in)
- Positions: Right-back; left-back

Youth career
- 2000–2008: Havndal Udbyneder IF
- 2008–2010: Hobro
- 2010–2015: Randers

Senior career*
Years	Team	Apps	(Gls)
2015–2017	Randers Freja		
2017	Brabrand	12	(3)
2017–2022	Hobro	112	(3)
2022	Jerv	28	(1)
2023	Hobro	10	(1)
2023–2026	Vendsyssel	59	(3)
2026	Hobro	6	(0)
- * Club domestic league appearances and goals

Mathias Haarup (born 10 February 1996) is a former Danish footballer who played as a right-back or left-back.

== Club career ==
=== Early career ===
At the age of four, Haarup started playing for local club Havndal Udbyneder IF, where he was coached by his own father, who began working for the club. He later signed for Hobro IK at the age of 12, where he had many friends from the talent-team. At this time, Haarup was playing as a forward. His last youth destination was Randers FC, which he joined at the age of 14. At this time, he was already involved with the first team.

=== Randers Freja ===
In 2015, Haarup was promoted to the Denmark Series team of Randers FC, because he became too old for playing for the U19 team and was not deemed good enough for the first team squad. Though, he was also training and playing for the reserve team of Randers. In 2016, he became the captain of the Denmark Series team.

In December 2016, Haarup went on a trial at Skive IK, without getting offered any contract at the end.

=== Brabrand IF ===
On 24 December 2016, Haarup signed for Danish 2nd Division club, Brabrand IF. He played 12 games for the club, before leaving in the summer 2017. This was announced by Brabrand IF in June 2016. He was playing as a winger during his time in Brabrand.

=== Hobro IK ===
After playing in the Denmark Series and a half year in the Danish 2nd Division, he finally reached the top league, after re-signing for newly promoted Danish Superliga club Hobro IK on 21 June 2017.

Haarup got his debut for Hobro IK on 14 August 2017. He started on the bench, but replaced Danny Olsen in the 89th minute in a 1–1 draw against AaB in the Danish Superliga.

=== Jerv ===
On 11 March 2022, Haarup signed for Norwegian Eliteserien club FK Jerv until the end of 2023.

=== Return to Hobro ===
At the end of January 2023, Haarup returned - once again - to Hobro IK, signing a deal until the end of the season. He left the club after the season after turning down Hobro's contract offer.

=== Vendsyssel ===
On 28 July 2023, Haarup signed a deal until June 2026 with Vendsyssel FF.

On 26 January 2026, Mathias Haarup terminated his contract with Vendsyssel FF by mutual agreement due to personal and family reasons.

=== Third spell at Hobro ===
On 28 January 2026, Haarup returned to Hobro IK for his third spell at the club, signing a deal with the club until the end of the season.

On 29 May 2026, Haarup announced his retirement from football.
