= Mikkel Pedersen (footballer) =

Danish footballer (born 1996)

Personal information
- Full name: Mikkel Mejlstrup Pedersen
- Date of birth: 7 January 1996 (age 30)
- Place of birth: Hobro, Denmark
- Height: 1.82 m (6 ft 0 in)
- Position: Midfielder

Team information
- Current team: Hobro
- Number: 8

Youth career
- 2000–2011: Hobro
- 2011–2014: Randers

Senior career*
Years	Team	Apps	(Gls)
2014–2016	Randers	0	(0)
2016–2022	Hobro	158	(11)
2022–2024	Randers	39	(0)
2024–	Hobro	47	(3)
- * Club domestic league appearances and goals as of 2 June 2026

Mikkel Mejlstrup Pedersen (born 7 January 1996) is a Danish professional footballer who plays as a midfielder for Danish 1st Division club Hobro IK.

== Career ==
=== Randers ===
Pedersen started playing football for local club Hobro IK at age four, progressing through various youth levels before moving to the Randers FC academy at under-15 level.

=== Hobro ===
On 20 July 2016, he returned to Hobro without having made a senior appearance for Randers. Pedersen made his professional debut on 31 July 2016, replacing Anders Holvad in the 59th minute of a 1–1 home draw against FC Helsingør in the Danish 1st Division. The club reached promotion in his first season, as Pedersen made 20 total appearances.

He made his debut at the top level, the Danish Superliga, on the first matchday of the 2017–18 season, a 2–1 win over Helsingør in which he came off the bench for Danny Olsen in the 81st minute.

Pedersen scored his first goal on 16 September 2018, equalizing in the Superliga match against Vendsyssel FF, which ended in a 1–1 away draw.

=== Return to Randers ===
On 3 August 2022, Pedersen returned for his second stint at Randers FC, signing a three-year contract.

=== Return to Hobro ===
After two years back in Randers, Pedersen once again returned to Hobro IK in August 2024, signing a deal until June 2027.
