= 2020–21 in Spanish football =

Football in Spain
- Season: 2020–21

Men's football
- La Liga: Atlético Madrid
- Segunda División: Espanyol
- Segunda División B: Real Sociedad B Amorebieta; Ibiza; Burgos
- Copa del Rey: Barcelona
- Supercopa: Athletic Bilbao

Women's football
- Primera División: Barcelona
- Copa de la Reina: Barcelona
- Supercopa: Atlético Madrid

The 2020–21 season was the 119th season of competitive association football in Spain.

== National teams ==
=== Spain national football team ===
==== Friendlies ====
7 October 2020	Portugal	0–0	Spain	Lisbon, Portugal
19:45		Report		Stadium: Estádio José Alvalade; Attendance: 2,500; Referee: Paolo Valeri (Italy)

11 November 2020	Netherlands	1–1	Spain	Amsterdam, Netherlands
20:45	Van de Beek 47'	Report	Canales 19'	Stadium: Johan Cruyff Arena; Attendance: 0 Referee: Davide Massa (Italy)

4 June 2021	Spain	0–0	Portugal	Madrid, Spain
19:30		Report		Stadium: Wanda Metropolitano; Attendance: 14,743; Referee: Craig Pawson (England)

8 June 2021	Spain	4–0	Lithuania	Leganés, Spain
19:45	Guillamón 3'; Brahim 24'; Miranda 54'; Puado 73'	Report		Stadium: Estadio Municipal de Butarque; Referee: Willy Delajod (France)

==== UEFA Nations League ====
===== Group 4 =====
Pos	Team	Pld	W	D	L	GF	GA	GD	Pts	Qualification or relegation	(Spain)	(Germany)	(Switzerland)	(Ukraine)
1	Spain	6	3	2	1	13	3	+10	11	Qualification for Nations League Finals	—	6–0	1–0	4–0
2	Germany	6	2	3	1	10	13	−3	9		1–1	—	3–3	3–1
3	Switzerland	6	1	3	2	9	8	+1	6 (Note: Tied on head-to-head points (3). Head-to-head goal difference: Switzerland +2, Ukraine −2.)		1–1	1–1	—	3–0 (Note: The Switzerland v Ukraine match was awarded as a 3–0 win to Switzerland after being cancelled as Ukraine were placed in quarantine prior to the match due to positive SARS-CoV-2 tests in the team.)
4	Ukraine (R)	6	2	0	4	5	13	−8	6	Relegation to League B	1–0	1–2	2–1	—

Source: UEFA
(R) Relegated
Notes:

3 September 2020	Germany	1–1	Spain	Stuttgart, Germany
20:45	Werner 51'	Report	Gayà 90+6'	Stadium: Mercedes-Benz Arena; Attendance: 0 (Note: Due to the COVID-19 pandemic in Europe, all matches scheduled for September 2020 were played behind closed doors.); Referee: Daniele Orsato (Italy)

6 September 2020	Spain	4–0	Ukraine	Madrid, Spain
20:45	Ramos 3' (pen.), 29'; Fati 32'; F. Torres 84'	Report		Stadium: Alfredo di Stéfano; Attendance: 0 Referee: Benoît Bastien (France)

10 October 2020	Spain	1–0	Switzerland	Madrid, Spain
20:45	Oyarzabal 14'	Report		Stadium: Alfredo Di Stéfano; Referee: Ali Palabıyık (Turkey)

13 October 2020	Ukraine	1–0	Spain	Kyiv, Ukraine
20:45	Tsyhankov 76'	Report		Stadium: NSC Olimpiyskiy Stadium; Referee: Paweł Gil (Poland)

14 November 2020	Switzerland	1–1	Spain	Basel, Switzerland
20:45	Freuler 26'	Report	Gerard 89'	Stadium: St. Jakob-Park; Referee: Willie Collum (Scotland)

17 November 2020	Spain	6–0	Germany	Seville, Spain
20:45	Morata 17'; Torres 33', 55', 71'; Rodri 38'; Oyarzabal 89'	Report		Stadium: La Cartuja; Referee: Andreas Ekberg (Sweden)

===== 2022 FIFA World Cup qualification =====
====== Group B ======
Pos	Team	Pld	W	D	L	GF	GA	GD	Pts	Qualification	Spain	Sweden	Greece	Georgia	Kosovo
1	Spain	8	6	1	1	15	5	+10	19	Qualification for 2022 FIFA World Cup	—	1–0	1–1	4–0	3–1
2	Sweden	8	5	0	3	12	6	+6	15	Advance to play-offs	2–1	—	2–0	1–0	3–0
3	Greece	8	2	4	2	8	8	0	10		0–1	2–1	—	1–1	1–1
4	Georgia	8	2	1	5	6	12	−6	7		1–2	2–0	0–2	—	0–1
5	Kosovo	8	1	2	5	5	15	−10	5		0–2	0–3	1–1	1–2	—

Source: FIFA, UEFA
Rules for classification: Tiebreakers

25 March 2021	Spain	1–1	Greece	Granada, Spain
20:45	Morata 33'	Report	Bakasetas 57' (pen.)	Stadium: Nuevo Los Cármenes; Referee: Marco Guida (Italy)

28 March 2021	Georgia	1–2	Spain	Tbilisi, Georgia
18:00	Kvaratskhelia 44'	Report	Torres 56'; Olmo 90+2'	Stadium: Boris Paichadze Dinamo Arena; Referee: Radu Petrescu (Romania)

31 March 2021	Spain	3–1	Kosovo	Seville, Spain
20:45	Olmo 34'; Torres 36'; Moreno 75'	Report	Halimi 70'	Stadium: La Cartuja; Referee: Jakob Kehlet (Denmark)

==== UEFA Euro 2020 ====
===== Group E =====
Pos	Team	Pld	W	D	L	GF	GA	GD	Pts	Qualification
1	Sweden	3	2	1	0	4	2	+2	7	Advance to knockout stage
2	Spain (H)	3	1	2	0	6	1	+5	5	Advance to knockout stage
3	Slovakia	3	1	0	2	2	7	−5	3	
4	Poland	3	0	1	2	4	6	−2	1	

Source: UEFA
(H) Hosts

14 June 2021	Spain	0–0	Sweden	Seville, Spain
21:00		Report		Stadium: La Cartuja; Attendance: 10,559; Referee: Slavko Vinčić (Slovenia)

19 June 2021	Spain	1–1	Poland	Seville, Spain
21:00	Morata 25'	Report	Lewandowski 54'	Stadium: La Cartuja; Attendance: 11,732; Referee: Daniele Orsato (Italy)

23 June 2021	Slovakia	0–5	Spain	Seville, Spain
18:00		Report	Dúbravka 30' (o.g.); Laporte 45+3'; Sarabia 56'; F. Torres 67'; Kucka 71' (o.g.)	Stadium: La Cartuja; Attendance: 11,204; Referee: Björn Kuipers (Netherlands)

====== Knockout phase ======
28 June 2021 R16	Croatia	3–5 (a.e.t.)	Spain	Copenhagen, Denmark
18:00	Pedri 20' (o.g.); Oršić 85'; Pašalić 90+2'	Report	Sarabia 38'; Azpilicueta 57'; F. Torres 77'; Morata 100'; Oyarzabal 103'	Stadium: Parken Stadium; Attendance: 22,771; Referee: Cüneyt Çakır (Turkey)

=== Spain national under-23 football team ===
==== Summer Olympics ====
Due to the COVID-19 pandemic, the games have been postponed to the summer of 2021. However, their official name remains 2020 Summer Olympics with the rescheduled 2021 dates have yet to be announced.

=== Spain women's national football team ===
==== Friendlies ====
9 April 2021	Spain	1–0	Netherlands	Marbella
19:00	Guijarro 31'			Stadium: Antonio Lorenzo Cuevas; Referee: Sandra Braz (Portugal)

13 April 2021	Spain	3–0	Mexico	Marbella
19:00	Cardona 66'; Nahikari 76', 89'			Stadium: Antonio Lorenzo Cuevas; Referee: Iuliana Demetrescu (Romania)

10 June 2021	Spain	3–0	Belgium	Alcorcón
	Caldentey 42'; Putellas 49'; Bonmatí 73'			Stadium: Estadio de Santo Domingo; Referee: Shona Shukrula (Netherlands)

15 June 2021	Spain	3–0	Denmark	Alcorcón
				Stadium: Estadio de Santo Domingo

==== UEFA Women's Euro 2021 ====
===== Group D =====
Pos	Team	Pld	W	D	L	GF	GA	GD	Pts	Qualification	Spain	Czech Republic	Poland	Moldova	Azerbaijan
1	Spain	8	7	1	0	48	1	+47	22	Final tournament	—	4–0	3–0	10–0	4–0
2	Czech Republic	8	5	1	2	24	9	+15	16	Play-offs	1–5	—	0–0	7–0	3–0
3	Poland	8	4	2	2	16	5	+11	14		0–0	0–2	—	5–0	3–0
4	Moldova	8	1	0	7	3	43	−40	3 (Note: Ranked on head-to-head goal difference: Moldova +1, Azerbaijan -1.)		0–9	0–7	0–3	—	3–1
5	Azerbaijan	8	1	0	7	2	35	−33	3		0–13	0–4	0–5	1–0	—

Source: UEFA
Rules for classification: Tiebreakers
Notes:

19 September 2020	Moldova	0–9	Spain	Chișinău, Moldova
			García 6', 38'; Sivolobova 9' (o.g.); Caldentey 27', 53', 81' (pen.); Hermoso 35'; Redondo 50'; Guijarro 76'	Stadium: Stadionul Zimbru; Attendance: 0 Referee: Jelena Pejkovic (Croatia)

22 October 2020	Spain	4–0	Czech Republic	Seville
	González 1'; Guijarro 25'; Bonmatí 34'; Putellas 53'	Report		Stadium: La Cartuja; Referee: Sara Persson (Sweden)

27 November 2020	Spain	10–0	Moldova	Madrid
	Bonmatí 7', 30'; Hermoso 13', 25', 87' (pen.); Calentey 28' (pen.); Prisăcari 45+2' (o.g.); Putellas 57'; Guijarro 71'; Navarro 84'	Report		Stadium: La Ciudad del Fútbol; Attendance: 0 Referee: Shona Shukrula (Netherlands)

18 February 2021	Azerbaijan	0–13	Spain	Baku, Azerbaijan
			Esther 21', 24', 30', 31', 87'; Hermoso 33', 43', 67', 82', 90+3'; Mariona 57'; E. Navarro 75'; Eizagirre 84'	Stadium: ASK Arena; Attendance: 0 Referee: Maria Marotta (Italy)

23 February 2021	Spain	3–0	Poland	Las Rozas de Madrid
	González 24', 69'; León 87'	Report		Stadium: La Ciudad del Fútbol; Referee: Anastasia Pustovoitova (Russia)

== UEFA competitions ==
=== UEFA Super Cup ===
24 September 2020
21:00 UTC+2

Bayern Munich (Germany)	2–1 (a.e.t.)	(Spain) Sevilla
Goretzka 34'; Martínez 104'	Report	Ocampos 13' (pen.)

Puskás Aréna, Budapest
Attendance: 15,180
Referee: Anthony Taylor (England)

=== UEFA Champions League ===
==== Group stage ====
===== Group A =====
Pos	Team	Pld	W	D	L	GF	GA	GD	Pts	Qualification	BAY	ATM	SAL	LMO
1	(Germany) Bayern Munich	6	5	1	0	18	5	+13	16	Advance to knockout phase	—	4–0	3–1	2–0
2	(Spain) Atlético Madrid	6	2	3	1	7	8	−1	9	Advance to knockout phase	1–1	—	3–2	0–0
3	(Austria) Red Bull Salzburg	6	1	1	4	10	17	−7	4	Transfer to Europa League	2–6	0–2	—	2–2
4	(Russia) Lokomotiv Moscow	6	0	3	3	5	10	−5	3		1–2	1–1	1–3	—

Source: UEFA

===== Group B =====
Pos	Team	Pld	W	D	L	GF	GA	GD	Pts	Qualification	RMA	BMG	SHK	INT
1	(Spain) Real Madrid	6	3	1	2	11	9	+2	10	Advance to knockout phase	—	2–0	2–3	3–2
2	(Germany) Borussia Mönchengladbach	6	2	2	2	16	9	+7	8 (Note: Head-to-head points: Borussia Mönchengladbach 6, Shakhtar Donetsk 0.)	Advance to knockout phase	2–2	—	4–0	2–3
3	(Ukraine) Shakhtar Donetsk	6	2	2	2	5	12	−7	8	Transfer to Europa League	2–0	0–6	—	0–0
4	(Italy) Inter Milan	6	1	3	2	7	9	−2	6		0–2	2–2	0–0	—

Source: UEFA

===== Group E =====
Pos	Team	Pld	W	D	L	GF	GA	GD	Pts	Qualification	CHE	SEV	KRA	REN
1	(England) Chelsea	6	4	2	0	14	2	+12	14	Advance to knockout phase	—	0–0	1–1	3–0
2	(Spain) Sevilla	6	4	1	1	9	8	+1	13	Advance to knockout phase	0–4	—	3–2	1–0
3	(Russia) Krasnodar	6	1	2	3	6	11	−5	5	Transfer to Europa League	0–4	1–2	—	1–0
4	(France) Rennes	6	0	1	5	3	11	−8	1		1–2	1–3	1–1	—

Source: UEFA

===== Group G =====
Pos	Team	Pld	W	D	L	GF	GA	GD	Pts	Qualification	JUV	BAR	DKV	FER
1	(Italy) Juventus	6	5	0	1	14	4	+10	15 (Note: Tied on head-to-head points (3). Head-to-head goal difference: Juventus +1, Barcelona –1.)	Advance to knockout phase	—	0–2	3–0	2–1
2	(Spain) Barcelona	6	5	0	1	16	5	+11	15	Advance to knockout phase	0–3	—	2–1	5–1
3	(Ukraine) Dynamo Kyiv	6	1	1	4	4	13	−9	4	Transfer to Europa League	0–2	0–4	—	1–0
4	(Hungary) Ferencváros	6	0	1	5	5	17	−12	1		1–4	0–3	2–2	—

Source: UEFA

==== Knockout phase ====
===== Round of 16 =====
Team 1	Agg.	Team 2	1st leg	2nd leg
Atlético Madrid (Spain)	0–3	(England) Chelsea	0–1	0–2
Barcelona (Spain)	2–5	(France) Paris Saint-Germain	1–4	1–1
Sevilla (Spain)	4–5	(Germany) Borussia Dortmund	2–3	2–2
Atalanta (Italy)	1–4	(Spain) Real Madrid	0–1	1–3

===== Quarter-finals =====
Team 1	Agg.	Team 2	1st leg	2nd leg
Real Madrid (Spain)	3–1	(England) Liverpool	3–1	0–0

===== Semi-finals =====
Team 1	Agg.	Team 2	1st leg	2nd leg
Real Madrid (Spain)	1–3	(England) Chelsea	1–1	0–2

=== UEFA Europa League ===
==== UEFA Europa League qualifying phase and play-off round ====
===== Second qualifying round =====
Team 1	Score	Team 2
Teuta (Albania)	0–4	(Spain) Granada

===== Third qualifying round =====
Team 1	Score	Team 2
Granada (Spain)	2–0	(Georgia (country)) Locomotive Tbilisi

===== Play-off round =====
Team 1	Score	Team 2
Malmö FF (Sweden)	1–3	(Spain) Granada

==== Group stage ====
===== Group E =====
Pos	Team	Pld	W	D	L	GF	GA	GD	Pts	Qualification	PSV	GRA	PAOK	OMO
1	(Netherlands) PSV Eindhoven	6	4	0	2	12	9	+3	12	Advance to knockout phase	—	1–2	3–2	4–0
2	(Spain) Granada	6	3	2	1	6	3	+3	11	Advance to knockout phase	0–1	—	0–0	2–1
3	(Greece) PAOK	6	1	3	2	8	7	+1	6		4–1	0–0	—	1–1
4	(Cyprus) Omonia	6	1	1	4	5	12	−7	4		1–2	0–2	2–1	—

Source: UEFA

===== Group F =====
Pos	Team	Pld	W	D	L	GF	GA	GD	Pts	Qualification	NAP	RSO	AZ	RJK
1	(Italy) Napoli	6	3	2	1	7	4	+3	11	Advance to knockout phase	—	1–1	0–1	2–0
2	(Spain) Real Sociedad	6	2	3	1	5	4	+1	9	Advance to knockout phase	0–1	—	1–0	2–2
3	(Netherlands) AZ	6	2	2	2	7	5	+2	8		1–1	0–0	—	4–1
4	(Croatia) Rijeka	6	1	1	4	6	12	−6	4		1–2	0–1	2–1	—

Source: UEFA

===== Group I =====
Pos	Team	Pld	W	D	L	GF	GA	GD	Pts	Qualification	VIL	MTA	SIV	QRB
1	(Spain) Villarreal	6	5	1	0	17	5	+12	16	Advance to knockout phase	—	4–0	5–3	3–0 (Note: The Villarreal v Qarabağ match was awarded as a 3–0 win to Villarreal after being cancelled as several players of the Qarabağ squad tested positive for the SARS-CoV-2.)
2	(Israel) Maccabi Tel Aviv	6	3	2	1	6	7	−1	11	Advance to knockout phase	1–1	—	1–0	1–0
3	(Turkey) Sivasspor	6	2	0	4	9	11	−2	6		0–1	1–2	—	2–0
4	(Azerbaijan) Qarabağ	6	0	1	5	4	13	−9	1		1–3	1–1	2–3	—

Source: UEFA

==== Knockout phase ====
===== Round of 32 =====
Team 1	Agg.	Team 2	1st leg	2nd leg
Real Sociedad (Spain)	0–4	(England) Manchester United	0–4	0–0
Red Bull Salzburg (Austria)	1–4	(Spain) Villarreal	0–2	1–2
Granada (Spain)	3–2	(Italy) Napoli	2–0	1–2

===== Round of 16 =====
Team 1	Agg.	Team 2	1st leg	2nd leg
Dynamo Kyiv (Ukraine)	0–4	(Spain) Villarreal	0–2	0–2
Granada (Spain)	3–2	(Norway) Molde	2–0	1–2

===== Quarter-finals =====
Team 1	Agg.	Team 2	1st leg	2nd leg
Granada (Spain)	0–4	(England) Manchester United	0–2	0–2
Dinamo Zagreb (Croatia)	1–3	(Spain) Villarreal	0–1	1–2

===== Semi-finals =====
Team 1	Agg.	Team 2	1st leg	2nd leg}
Villarreal (Spain)	2–1	(England) Arsenal	2–1	0–0

===== Final =====
26 May 2021
21:00 UTC+2

Villarreal (Spain)	1–1 (a.e.t.)	(England) Manchester United
Gerard 29'	Report	Cavani 55'
Penalties
Gerard (penalty scored); Raba (penalty scored); Alcácer (penalty scored); Moreno (penalty scored); Parejo (penalty scored); Gómez (penalty scored); Albiol (penalty scored); Coquelin (penalty scored); Gaspar (penalty scored); Torres (penalty scored); Rulli (penalty scored)	11–10	(penalty scored) Mata; (penalty scored) Telles; (penalty scored) Fernandes; (penalty scored) Rashford; (penalty scored) Cavani; (penalty scored) Fred; (penalty scored) James; (penalty scored) Shaw; (penalty scored) Tuanzebe; (penalty scored) Lindelöf; (penalty missed) De Gea

Stadion Gdańsk, Gdańsk
Attendance: 9,412
Referee: Clément Turpin (France)

=== UEFA Youth League ===
On 17 February 2021, the UEFA Executive Committee cancelled the tournament.

==== UEFA Champions League Path ====
Team 1	Score	Team 2
Sevilla (Spain)	3 Mar	(France) Paris Saint-Germain
Manchester United (England)	2 Mar	(Spain) Real Madrid
Midtjylland (Denmark)	3 Mar	(Spain) Atlético Madrid
Dynamo Kyiv (Ukraine)	2 Mar	(Spain) Barcelona

==== Domestic Champions Path ====
Team 1	Score	Team 2
Olimpija Ljubljana (Slovenia)	3 Mar	(Spain) Celta Vigo

=== UEFA Women's Champions League ===
==== Knockout phase ====
===== Round of 32 =====
Team 1	Agg.	Team 2	1st leg	2nd leg
PSV (Netherlands)	2–8	(Spain) Barcelona	1–4	1–4
Servette Chênois (Switzerland)	2–9	(Spain) Atlético Madrid	2–4	0–5

===== Round of 16 =====
Team 1	Agg.	Team 2	1st leg	2nd leg
Barcelona (Spain)	9–0	(Denmark) Fortuna Hjørring	4–0	5–0
Chelsea (England)	3–1	(Spain) Atlético Madrid	2–0	1–1

===== Quarter-finals =====
Team 1	Agg.	Team 2	1st leg	2nd leg
Barcelona (Spain)	4–2	(England) Manchester City	3–0	1–2

===== Semi-finals =====
Team 1	Agg.	Team 2	1st leg	2nd leg
Paris Saint-Germain (France)	2–3	(Spain) Barcelona	1–1	1–2

===== Final =====
16 May 2021
21:00 UTC+2

Chelsea (England)	0–4	(Spain) Barcelona
	Report	Leupolz 1' (o.g.); Putellas 14' (pen.); Bonmatí 21'; Hansen 36'

Gamla Ullevi, Gothenburg
Attendance: 0 (Note: The final was played behind closed doors due to the COVID-19 pandemic in Sweden.)
Referee: Riem Hussein (Germany)

== Men's football ==
=== League season ===
==== La Liga ====
Pos	Team	Pld	W	D	L	GF	GA	GD	Pts	Qualification or relegation
1	Atlético Madrid (C)	38	26	8	4	67	25	+42	86	Qualification for the Champions League group stage
2	Real Madrid	38	25	9	4	67	28	+39	84	Qualification for the Champions League group stage
3	Barcelona	38	24	7	7	85	38	+47	79	Qualification for the Champions League group stage
4	Sevilla	38	24	5	9	53	33	+20	77	Qualification for the Champions League group stage
5	Real Sociedad	38	17	11	10	59	38	+21	62	Qualification for the Europa League group stage (Note: Since the winners of the 2020–21 Copa del Rey, Barcelona, qualified for the 2021–22 UEFA Champions League based on league position, the spot awarded to the cup winners (Europa League group stage) was passed to the sixth-placed team, and the spot awarded to the sixth-placed team (2021–22 UEFA Europa Conference League play-off round) was passed to the seventh-placed team, Villarreal.)
6	Real Betis	38	17	10	11	50	50	0	61	Qualification for the Europa League group stage
7	Villarreal	38	15	13	10	60	44	+16	58	Qualification for the Champions League group stage (Note: Villarreal qualified for the 2021–22 UEFA Champions League by winning the 2020–21 UEFA Europa League. Based on their league position (7th), they would have received the spot above to enter the Europa Conference League play-off round. This spot was vacated without replacement as per UEFA regulations.)
8	Celta Vigo	38	14	11	13	55	57	−2	53	
9	Granada	38	13	7	18	47	65	−18	46 (Note: Granada finished ahead of Athletic Bilbao on head-to-head goal difference: Granada 2–0 Athletic Bilbao, Athletic Bilbao 2–1 Granada.)	
10	Athletic Bilbao	38	11	13	14	46	42	+4	46	
11	Osasuna	38	11	11	16	37	48	−11	44 (Note: Osasuna finished ahead of Cádiz on head-to-head points: Cádiz 0–2 Osasuna, Osasuna 3–2 Cádiz.)	
12	Cádiz	38	11	11	16	36	58	−22	44	
13	Valencia	38	10	13	15	50	53	−3	43	
14	Levante	38	9	14	15	46	57	−11	41	
15	Getafe	38	9	11	18	28	43	−15	38	
16	Alavés	38	9	11	18	36	57	−21	38	
17	Elche	38	8	12	18	34	55	−21	36	
18	Huesca (R)	38	7	13	18	34	53	−19	34	Relegation to Segunda División
19	Valladolid (R)	38	5	16	17	34	57	−23	31	Relegation to Segunda División
20	Eibar (R)	38	6	12	20	29	52	−23	30	Relegation to Segunda División

Source: La Liga
Rules for classification: 1) Points; 2) Head-to-head points; 3) Head-to-head goal difference; 4) Goal difference; 5) Goals scored; 6) Fair-play points (Note: Head-to-head record is used only after all the matches between the teams in question have been played)
(C) Champions; (R) Relegated

==== Segunda División ====
Pos	Team	Pld	W	D	L	GF	GA	GD	Pts	Promotion, qualification or relegation
1	Espanyol (C, P)	42	24	10	8	71	28	+43	82 (Note: Head-to-head points: Espanyol: 4, Mallorca: 1)	Promotion to La Liga
2	Mallorca (P)	42	24	10	8	54	28	+26	82	Promotion to La Liga
3	Leganés	42	21	10	11	51	32	+19	73 (Note: Head-to-head points: Leganés: 4, Almería: 1)	Qualification for promotion play-offs
4	Almería	42	21	10	11	61	40	+21	73	Qualification for promotion play-offs
5	Girona	42	20	11	11	47	36	+11	71	Qualification for promotion play-offs
6	Rayo Vallecano (O, P)	42	19	10	13	52	40	+12	67	Qualification for promotion play-offs
7	Sporting Gijón	42	17	14	11	37	28	+9	65	
8	Ponferradina	42	15	12	15	45	50	−5	57	
9	Las Palmas	42	14	14	14	46	53	−7	56	
10	Mirandés	42	14	12	16	38	41	−3	54 (Note: Head-to-head points: Mirandés: 6, Fuenlabrada: 0)	
11	Fuenlabrada	42	12	18	12	45	46	−1	54	
12	Málaga	42	14	11	17	37	47	−10	53	
13	Oviedo	42	11	19	12	45	46	−1	52 (Note: Head-to-head points: Oviedo: 4, Tenerife: 1)	
14	Tenerife	42	13	13	16	36	36	0	52	
15	Zaragoza	42	13	11	18	37	43	−6	50	
16	Cartagena	42	12	13	17	44	52	−8	49	
17	Alcorcón	42	13	9	20	32	42	−10	48	
18	Lugo	42	11	14	17	38	53	−15	47	
19	Sabadell (R)	42	11	13	18	40	48	−8	46	Relegation to Primera División RFEF
20	UD Logroñés (R)	42	11	11	20	28	53	−25	44	Relegation to Primera División RFEF
21	Castellón (R)	42	11	8	23	35	54	−19	41	Relegation to Primera División RFEF
22	Albacete (R)	42	9	11	22	30	53	−23	38	Relegation to Primera División RFEF

Source: LaLiga
Rules for classification: 1) points; 2) head-to-head points; 3) head-to-head goal difference; 4) goal difference; 5) number of goals scored
(C) Champions; (O) Play-off winners; (P) Promoted; (R) Relegated

==== Segunda División B ====
Group 1
Pos	Team	Pld	Pts
1	Burgos (C)	18	39
2	Cultural Leonesa	18	31
3	Valladolid Promesas	18	30
4	Numancia	18	25
5	Langreo	18	25
6	Marino Luanco	18	22
7	Oviedo B	18	21
8	Lealtad	18	20
9	Sporting Gijón B	18	16
10	Covadonga	18	14

Source: RFEF
(C) Champions

Group 1
Pos	Team	Pld	Pts
1	Burgos (O, P)	24	50
2	Celta Vigo B	24	40
3	Zamora	24	40
4	Unionistas	24	39
5	Valladolid Promesas	24	39
6	Cultural Leonesa	24	34

Source: BeSoccer
(O) Play-off winners;
(P) Promoted

Group 1
Pos	Team	Pld	Pts
1	Coruxo	26	36
2	Salamanca	26	35
3	Pontevedra	26	34
4	Oviedo B (R)	26	30
5	Lealtad (R)	26	28
6	Sporting Gijón B (R)	26	26
7	Guijuelo (R)	26	22
8	Covadonga (R)	26	15

Source: BeSoccer
(R) Relegated

Group 2
Pos	Team	Pld	Pts
1	Real Sociedad B (C)	20	40
2	Athletic Bilbao B	20	39
3	Amorebieta	20	37
4	Racing Santander	20	35
5	Real Unión	20	33
6	Arenas	20	26
7	Laredo	20	24
8	Portugalete	20	22
9	Alavés B	20	20
10	Barakaldo	20	17
11	Leioa	20	10

Source: RFEF
(C) Champions

Group 2
Pos	Team	Pld	Pts
1	Tudelano (C)	18	34
2	Calahorra	18	34
3	SD Logroñés	18	29
4	Ebro	18	28
5	Osasuna B	18	24
6	Tarazona	18	24
7	Mutilvera	18	23
8	Ejea	18	18
9	Izarra	18	15
10	Haro	18	12

Source: RFEF
(C) Champions

Group 2
Pos	Team	Pld	Pts	PPG
1	Real Sociedad B (O, P)	26	53	2.04
2	Athletic Bilbao B	26	51	1.96
3	Amorebieta (O, P)	26	49	1.88
4	Calahorra	24	42	1.75
5	Tudelano	24	34	1.42
6	SD Logroñés	24	34	1.42

Source: BeSoccer
(O) Play-off winners;
(P) Promoted

Group 2
Pos	Team	Pld	Pts
1	Real Unión (P)	26	45
2	Racing Santander (P)	26	42
3	Arenas	26	39
4	Ebro	26	39
5	Osasuna B	26	37
6	Tarazona	26	31
7	Laredo	26	29

Source: BeSoccer
(P) Promoted

Group 2
Pos	Team	Pld	Pts	PPG
1	Mutilvera	26	39	1.50
2	Ejea	26	37	1.42
3	Izarra	26	34	1.31
4	Portugalete (R)	28	28	1.00
5	Haro (R)	26	25	0.96
6	Alavés B (R)	28	22	0.79
7	Barakaldo (R)	28	22	0.79
8	Leioa (R)	28	16	0.57

Source: BeSoccer
(R) Relegated

Group 3
Pos	Team	Pld	Pts
1	Gimnàstic (C)	20	35
2	Barcelona B	20	34
3	Andorra	20	31
4	Llagostera	20	29
5	Cornellà	20	29
6	Badalona	20	28
7	Lleida Esportiu	20	27
8	Espanyol B	20	23
9	L'Hospitalet	20	22
10	Prat	20	21
11	Olot	20	18

Source: RFEF
(C) Champions

Group 3
Pos	Team	Pld	Pts
1	Ibiza (C)	18	40
2	Alcoyano	18	31
3	Villarreal B	18	28
4	Hércules	18	24
5	La Nucía	18	23
6	Atlético Levante	18	22
7	Atzeneta	18	21
8	Peña Deportiva	18	21
9	Orihuela	18	15
10	Valencia Mestalla	18	15

Source: RFEF
(C) Champions

Group 3
Pos	Team	Pld	Pts	PPG
1	Ibiza (O, P)	24	52	2.17
2	Barcelona B	26	49	1.88
3	Andorra	26	44	1.69
4	Gimnàstic	26	43	1.65
5	Alcoyano	24	33	1.38
6	Villarreal B	24	29	1.21

Source: BeSoccer
(O) Play-off winners;
(P) Promoted

Group 3
Pos	Team	Pld	Pts
1	Cornellà (P)	26	42
2	Llagostera (P)	26	39
3	Hércules	26	38
4	Lleida Esportiu	26	35
5	Badalona	26	33
6	La Nucía	26	31
7	Atlético Levante	26	30

Source: BeSoccer
(P) Promoted

Group 3
Pos	Team	Pld	Pts	PPG
1	Peña Deportiva	26	36	1.38
2	Espanyol B	28	37	1.32
3	Prat	28	36	1.29
4	Olot (R)	28	34	1.21
5	Atzeneta (R)	26	28	1.08
6	L'Hospitalet (R)	28	30	1.07
7	Orihuela (R)	26	25	0.96
8	Valencia Mestalla (R)	26	18	0.69

Source: BeSoccer
(R) Relegated

Group 4
Pos	Team	Pld	Pts
1	Algeciras (C)	18	32
2	San Fernando	18	31
3	Atlético Sanluqueño	18	31
4	Linense	18	28
5	Tamaraceite	18	27
6	Cádiz B	18	23
7	Las Palmas Atlético	18	21
8	Recreativo	18	20
9	Marbella	18	18
10	Marino	18	10

Source: RFEF
(C) Champions

Group 4
Pos	Team	Pld	Pts
1	UCAM Murcia (C)	18	33
2	Linares	18	33
3	Betis Deportivo	18	30
4	Sevilla Atlético	18	30
5	Córdoba	18	27
6	Murcia	18	25
7	Recreativo Granada	18	23
8	El Ejido	18	19
9	Yeclano	18	11
10	Lorca Deportiva	18	9

Source: RFEF
(C) Champions

Group 4
Pos	Team	Pld	Pts
1	Linares	24	47
2	UCAM Murcia	24	43
3	Algeciras	24	40
4	Betis Deportivo	24	39
5	San Fernando	24	38
6	Atlético Sanluqueño	24	34

Source: BeSoccer

Group 4
Pos	Team	Pld	Pts
1	Sevilla Atlético (P)	24	38
2	Linense (P)	24	38
3	Córdoba	24	37
4	Murcia	24	35
5	Tamaraceite	24	33
6	Cádiz B	24	29

Source: BeSoccer
(P) Promoted

Group 4
Pos	Team	Pld	Pts
1	Las Palmas Atlético	26	35
2	El Ejido	26	35
3	Recreativo Granada	26	35
4	Marbella (R)	26	34
5	Yeclano (R)	26	29
6	Recreativo (R)	26	23
7	Lorca Deportiva (R)	26	19
8	Marino (R)	26	12

Source: BeSoccer
(R) Relegated

=== Cup competitions ===
==== Copa del Rey ====
===== 2020 Copa del Rey Final =====
The final was supposed to be played on 18 April 2020, but was postponed due to the COVID-19 pandemic.

3 April 2021
21:30 CEST

Athletic Bilbao	0–1	Real Sociedad
	Report	Oyarzabal 63' (pen.)

La Cartuja, Seville
Attendance: 0 (Note: The match was played behind closed doors due to the COVID-19 pandemic in Spain.)
Referee: Xavier Estrada Fernández (Catalonia)

===== 2020–21 Copa del Rey =====
====== Final ======
17 April 2021
21:30 CEST

Athletic Bilbao	0–4	Barcelona
	Report	Griezmann 60'; De Jong 63'; Messi 68', 72'

La Cartuja, Seville
Attendance: 0 (Note: The match was played behind closed doors due to the COVID-19 pandemic in Spain.)
Referee: Juan Martínez Munuera (Valencian Community)

==== Supercopa de España ====
The Supercopa was played among four teams: 2019–20 La Liga winners and runners-up Real Madrid and Barcelona, and 2019–20 Copa del Rey finalists Athletic Bilbao and Real Sociedad.

===== Final =====
17 January 2021
21:00

Barcelona	2–3 (a.e.t.)	Athletic Bilbao
Griezmann 40', 77'	Report	De Marcos 42'; Villalibre 90'; Williams 93'

La Cartuja, Seville
Attendance: 0
Referee: Jesús Gil Manzano (Extremadura)

== Women's football ==
=== League season ===
==== Primera División ====
Pos	Team	Pld	W	D	L	GF	GA	GD	Pts	Qualification or relegation
1	Barcelona (C)	34	33	0	1	167	15	+152	99	Qualification for the Champions League group stage
2	Real Madrid	34	23	5	6	75	33	+42	74	Qualification for the Champions League second round
3	Levante	34	21	7	6	68	44	+24	70	Qualification for the Champions League first round
4	Atlético de Madrid	34	18	9	7	61	32	+29	63	
5	Real Sociedad	34	18	7	9	66	44	+22	61	
6	Granadilla	34	17	7	10	58	46	+12	58	
7	Madrid CFF	34	16	5	13	49	44	+5	53	
8	Sevilla	34	12	9	13	42	50	−8	45	
9	Valencia	34	11	11	12	51	60	−9	44	
10	Sporting de Huelva	34	12	8	14	37	48	−11	44	
11	Athletic Club	34	11	7	16	43	60	−17	40	
12	Betis	34	9	8	17	34	62	−28	35	
13	Rayo Vallecano	34	8	10	16	37	58	−21	34	
14	Eibar	34	9	6	19	32	62	−30	33	
15	Deportivo (R)	34	8	5	21	39	81	−42	29	Relegation to Segunda División
16	Espanyol (R)	34	6	7	21	31	70	−39	25	Relegation to Segunda División
17	Logroño (R)	34	5	9	20	32	60	−28	24	Relegation to Segunda División
18	Santa Teresa (R)	34	6	6	22	23	76	−53	24	Relegation to Segunda División

Source: RFEF
Rules for classification: 1) points; 2) head-to-head points; 3) goal difference; 4) number of goals scored
(C) Champions; (R) Relegated

=== Cup competitions ===
==== Supercopa de España ====
===== Final =====
16 January 2021
20:45

Levante	0–3	Atlético Madrid
	Report	Castellanos 18'; Nchout 22', 32'

Estadio de los Juegos Mediterráneos, Almería
Attendance: 0
Referee: Marta Frías Acedo
