= 2019–20 in Spanish football =

Football in Spain
- Season: 2019–20

Men's football
- La Liga: Real Madrid
- Segunda División: Huesca
- Segunda División B: Not awarded
- Copa del Rey: Real Sociedad
- Copa Federación: Murcia
- Supercopa: Real Madrid

Women's football
- Primera División: Barcelona
- Segunda División: Athletic Bilbao B Santa Teresa
- Supercopa: Barcelona

The 2019–20 season was the 118th season of competitive association football in Spain.

== Promotion and relegation ==
=== Pre-season ===
League	Promoted to league	Relegated from league
La Liga	Osasuna; Granada; Mallorca	Girona; Huesca; Rayo Vallecano
Segunda División	Fuenlabrada; Mirandés; Ponferradina; Racing Santander	Rayo Majadahonda; Córdoba; Gimnàstic; Reus (Note: Reus was relegated to Tercera División due to financial troubles.)
Segunda División B	Alavés B; Algeciras; Andorra (Note: Andorra was promoted from Primera División Catalana to replace Reus.); Cádiz B; Getafe B; Haro; La Nucía; Las Rozas; Llagostera; Marino Luanco; Mérida; Orihuela; Osasuna B; Peña Deportiva; Prat; Racing Ferrol; Villarrobledo; Villarrubia; Yeclano	Alcoyano; Almería B; Atlético Malagueño; Conquense; Deportivo Fabril; Durango; El Ejido; Gernika; Gimnástica Torrelavega; Jumilla; Navalcarnero; Ontinyent; Peralada; Rápido de Bouzas; Teruel; Unión Adarve; Villanovense; Vitoria
Primera División (women)	Deportivo La Coruña; Tacón	Fundación Albacete; Málaga

== National teams ==
=== Spain national football team ===
==== Friendlies ====
TBD	Spain	v	Germany	Madrid, Spain
				Stadium: Metropolitano

TBD	Netherlands	v	Spain	Amsterdam, Netherlands
				Stadium: Johan Cruyff Arena

TBD	Spain	v	Portugal	Madrid, Spain
21:00				Stadium: Metropolitano

==== UEFA Euro 2020 qualifying ====
===== Group F =====
Pos	Team	Pld	W	D	L	GF	GA	GD	Pts	Qualification	(Spain)	(Sweden)	(Norway)	(Romania)	(Faroe Islands)	(Malta)
1	Spain	10	8	2	0	31	5	+26	26	Qualify for final tournament	—	3–0	2–1	5–0	4–0	7–0
2	Sweden	10	6	3	1	23	9	+14	21	Qualify for final tournament	1–1	—	1–1	2–1	3–0	3–0
3	Norway	10	4	5	1	19	11	+8	17	Advance to play-offs via Nations League	1–1	3–3	—	2–2	4–0	2–0
4	Romania	10	4	2	4	17	15	+2	14	Advance to play-offs via Nations League	1–2	0–2	1–1	—	4–1	1–0
5	Faroe Islands	10	1	0	9	4	30	−26	3 (Note: Tied on head-to-head points (3) and head-to-head goal difference (0). Head-to-head away goals: Faroe Islands 1, Malta 0.)		1–4	0–4	0–2	0–3	—	1–0
6	Malta	10	1	0	9	3	27	−24	3		0–2	0–4	1–2	0–4	2–1	—

Source: UEFA
Rules for classification: Qualification tiebreakers
Notes:

5 September 2019	Romania	1–2	Spain	Bucharest, Romania
20:45 (21:45 UTC+3)	Andone 59'	Report	Ramos 29' (pen.); Alcácer 47'	Stadium: Arena Națională; Attendance: 50,024; Referee: Deniz Aytekin (Germany)

8 September 2019	Spain	4–0	Faroe Islands	Gijón, Spain
20:45 (UTC+1)	Rodrigo 13', 50'; Alcácer 90', 90+3'	Report		Stadium: El Molinón; Attendance: 23,644; Referee: Krzysztof Jakubik (Poland)

12 October 2019	Norway	1–1	Spain	Oslo, Norway
20:45 (19:45 UTC+1)	King 90+4' (pen.)	Report	Saúl 47'	Stadium: Ullevaal Stadion; Referee: Michael Oliver (England)

15 October 2019	Sweden	1–1	Spain	Solna, Sweden
20:45	Berg 50'	Report	Rodrigo 90+2'	Stadium: Friends Arena; Referee: Clément Turpin (France)

15 November 2019	Spain	7–0	Malta	Cádiz, Spain
20:45 (19:45 UTC+1)	Morata 23'; Cazorla 41'; Torres 62'; Sarabia 63'; Olmo 69'; Moreno 71'; Navas 85'	Report		Stadium: Ramón de Carranza; Referee: Viktor Kassai (Hungary)

18 November 2019	Spain	5–0	Romania	Madrid, Spain
20:45	Fabián 8'; Gerard 33', 43'; Rus 45+1' (o.g.); Oyarzabal 90+2'	Report		Stadium: Wanda Metropolitano; Referee: Aleksei Kulbakov (Belarus)

=== Spain women's national football team ===
==== Friendlies ====
31 August 2019	France	2–0	Spain	Clermont-Ferrand, France
21:00				Stadium: Stade Gabriel Montpied

==== UEFA Euro 2021 qualifying ====
===== Group D =====
Pos	Team	Pld	W	D	L	GF	GA	GD	Pts	Qualification	Spain	Czech Republic	Poland	Moldova	Azerbaijan
1	Spain	8	7	1	0	48	1	+47	22	Final tournament	—	4–0	3–0	10–0	4–0
2	Czech Republic	8	5	1	2	24	9	+15	16	Play-offs	1–5	—	0–0	7–0	3–0
3	Poland	8	4	2	2	16	5	+11	14		0–0	0–2	—	5–0	3–0
4	Moldova	8	1	0	7	3	43	−40	3 (Note: Ranked on head-to-head goal difference: Moldova +1, Azerbaijan -1.)		0–9	0–7	0–3	—	3–1
5	Azerbaijan	8	1	0	7	2	35	−33	3		0–13	0–4	0–5	1–0	—

Source: UEFA
Rules for classification: Tiebreakers
Notes:

4 October 2019	Spain	4–0	Azerbaijan	A Coruña, Spain
21:30	Guijarro 8'; Torrecilla 26'; Bonmatí 54', 76'	Report		Stadium: Estadio Riazor; Attendance: 10,444; Referee: Paula Brady (Republic of Ireland)

8 October 2019	Czech Republic	1–5	Spain	Prague, Czech Republic
19:00	Voňková 89'	Report	Sedláčková 7' (o.g.); Caldentey 11'; Bonmatí 23'; Paredes 35'; Hermoso 79'	Stadium: Ďolíček; Attendance: 1,895; Referee: Tess Olofsson (Sweden)

12 November 2019	Poland	0–0	Spain	Lublin, Poland
18:00		Report		Stadium: Arena Lublin; Attendance: 7,528; Referee: Frida Nielsen (Denmark)

==== 2020 SheBelieves Cup ====
Pos	Team	Pld	W	D	L	GF	GA	GD	Pts
1st place, gold medalist(s)	United States (H, C)	3	3	0	0	6	1	+5	9
2nd place, silver medalist(s)	Spain	3	2	0	1	4	2	+2	6
3rd place, bronze medalist(s)	England	3	1	0	2	1	3	−2	3
4	Japan	3	0	0	3	2	7	−5	0

Source: US Soccer
Rules for classification: 1) points; 2) goal difference; 3) goals scored; 4) head-to-head result; 5) fair play ranking
(C) Champions; (H) Hosts

5 March 2020	Spain	3–1	Japan	Orlando, Florida
16:15 ET	Putellas 8'; L. García 48', 78'	Report	Iwabuchi 44'	Stadium: Exploria Stadium; Attendance: 7,528; Referee: Katja Koroleva (United States)

8 March 2020	United States	1–0	Spain	Harrison, New Jersey
17:00 ET	Ertz 87'	Report		Stadium: Red Bull Arena; Attendance: 26,500; Referee: Katia García (Mexico)

11 March 2020	Spain	1–0	England	Frisco, Texas
14:15 CT	Putellas 83'			Stadium: Toyota Stadium; Referee: Danielle Chesky (United States)

== UEFA competitions ==
=== 2019–20 UEFA Champions League ===
==== Group stage ====
===== Group A =====
Pos	Team	Pld	W	D	L	GF	GA	GD	Pts	Qualification	PAR	RMA	BRU	GAL
1	(France) Paris Saint-Germain	6	5	1	0	17	2	+15	16	Advance to knockout phase	—	3–0	1–0	5–0
2	(Spain) Real Madrid	6	3	2	1	14	8	+6	11	Advance to knockout phase	2–2	—	2–2	6–0
3	(Belgium) Club Brugge	6	0	3	3	4	12	−8	3	Transfer to Europa League	0–5	1–3	—	0–0
4	(Turkey) Galatasaray	6	0	2	4	1	14	−13	2		0–1	0–1	1–1	—

Source: UEFA

===== Group D =====
Pos	Team	Pld	W	D	L	GF	GA	GD	Pts	Qualification	JUV	ATM	LEV	LMO
1	(Italy) Juventus	6	5	1	0	12	4	+8	16	Advance to knockout phase	—	1–0	3–0	2–1
2	(Spain) Atlético Madrid	6	3	1	2	8	5	+3	10	Advance to knockout phase	2–2	—	1–0	2–0
3	(Germany) Bayer Leverkusen	6	2	0	4	5	9	−4	6	Transfer to Europa League	0–2	2–1	—	1–2
4	(Russia) Lokomotiv Moscow	6	1	0	5	4	11	−7	3		1–2	0–2	0–2	—

Source: UEFA

===== Group F =====
Pos	Team	Pld	W	D	L	GF	GA	GD	Pts	Qualification	BAR	DOR	INT	SLP
1	(Spain) Barcelona	6	4	2	0	9	4	+5	14	Advance to knockout phase	—	3–1	2–1	0–0
2	(Germany) Borussia Dortmund	6	3	1	2	8	8	0	10	Advance to knockout phase	0–0	—	3–2	2–1
3	(Italy) Inter Milan	6	2	1	3	10	9	+1	7	Transfer to Europa League	1–2	2–0	—	1–1
4	(Czech Republic) Slavia Prague	6	0	2	4	4	10	−6	2		1–2	0–2	1–3	—

Source: UEFA

===== Group H =====
Pos	Team	Pld	W	D	L	GF	GA	GD	Pts	Qualification	VAL	CHE	AJX	LIL
1	(Spain) Valencia	6	3	2	1	9	7	+2	11 (Note: Head-to-head points: Valencia 4, Chelsea 1.)	Advance to knockout phase	—	2–2	0–3	4–1
2	(England) Chelsea	6	3	2	1	11	9	+2	11	Advance to knockout phase	0–1	—	4–4	2–1
3	(Netherlands) Ajax	6	3	1	2	12	6	+6	10	Transfer to Europa League	0–1	0–1	—	3–0
4	(France) Lille	6	0	1	5	4	14	−10	1		1–1	1–2	0–2	—

Source: UEFA

==== Knockout phase ====
===== Round of 16 =====
Team 1	Agg.	Team 2	1st leg	2nd leg
Real Madrid (Spain)	2–4	(England) Manchester City	1–2	1–2
Atalanta (Italy)	8–4	(Spain) Valencia	4–1	4–3
Atlético Madrid (Spain)	4–2	(England) Liverpool	1–0	3–2 (a.e.t.)
Napoli (Italy)	2–4	(Spain) Barcelona	1–1	1–3

===== Quarter-finals =====
Team 1	Score	Team 2
RB Leipzig (Germany)	2–1	(Spain) Atlético Madrid
Barcelona (Spain)	2–8	(Germany) Bayern Munich

=== 2019–20 UEFA Europa League ===
==== Second qualifying round ====
Team 1	Agg.	Team 2	1st leg	2nd leg
Espanyol (Spain)	7–1	(Iceland) Stjarnan	4–0	3–1

==== Third qualifying round ====
Team 1	Agg.	Team 2	1st leg	2nd leg
Luzern (Switzerland)	0–6	(Spain) Espanyol	0–3	0–3

==== Play-off round ====
Team 1	Agg.	Team 2	1st leg	2nd leg
Espanyol (Spain)	5–3	(Ukraine) Zorya Luhansk	3–1	2–2

==== Group stage ====
===== Group A =====
Pos	Team	Pld	W	D	L	GF	GA	GD	Pts	Qualification	SEV	APO	QRB	DUD
1	(Spain) Sevilla	6	5	0	1	14	3	+11	15	Advance to knockout phase	—	1–0	2–0	3–0
2	(Cyprus) APOEL	6	3	1	2	10	8	+2	10	Advance to knockout phase	1–0	—	2–1	3–4
3	(Azerbaijan) Qarabağ	6	1	2	3	8	11	−3	5		0–3	2–2	—	1–1
4	(Luxembourg) F91 Dudelange	6	1	1	4	8	18	−10	4		2–5	0–2	1–4	—

Source: UEFA

===== Group C =====
Pos	Team	Pld	W	D	L	GF	GA	GD	Pts	Qualification	BSL	GET	KRA	TRA
1	(Switzerland) Basel	6	4	1	1	12	4	+8	13	Advance to knockout phase	—	2–1	5–0	2–0
2	(Spain) Getafe	6	4	0	2	8	4	+4	12	Advance to knockout phase	0–1	—	3–0	1–0
3	(Russia) Krasnodar	6	3	0	3	7	11	−4	9		1–0	1–2	—	3–1
4	(Turkey) Trabzonspor	6	0	1	5	3	11	−8	1		2–2	0–1	0–2	—

Source: UEFA

===== Group H =====
Pos	Team	Pld	W	D	L	GF	GA	GD	Pts	Qualification	ESP	LUD	FER	CSKA
1	(Spain) Espanyol	6	3	2	1	12	4	+8	11	Advance to knockout phase	—	6–0	1–1	0–1
2	(Bulgaria) Ludogorets Razgrad	6	2	2	2	10	10	0	8	Advance to knockout phase	0–1	—	1–1	5–1
3	(Hungary) Ferencváros	6	1	4	1	5	7	−2	7		2–2	0–3	—	0–0
4	(Russia) CSKA Moscow	6	1	2	3	3	9	−6	5		0–2	1–1	0–1	—

Source: UEFA

==== Knockout phase ====
===== Round of 32 =====
Team 1	Agg.	Team 2	1st leg	2nd leg
Wolverhampton Wanderers (England)	6–3	(Spain) Espanyol	4–0	2–3
Getafe (Spain)	3–2	(Netherlands) Ajax	2–0	1–2
CFR Cluj (Romania)	1–1(a)	(Spain) Sevilla	1–1	0–0

===== Round of 16 =====
Team 1	Score	Team 2
Inter Milan (Italy)	2–0	(Spain) Getafe
Sevilla (Spain)	2–0	(Italy) Roma

===== Quarter-finals =====
Team 1	Score	Team 2
Wolverhampton Wanderers (England)	0–1	(Spain) Sevilla

===== Semi-finals =====
Team 1	Score	Team 2
Sevilla (Spain)	2–1	(England) Manchester United

===== Final =====
21 August 2020
21:00 UTC+2

Sevilla (Spain)	3–2	(Italy) Inter Milan
De Jong 12', 33'; Lukaku 74' (o.g.)	Report	Lukaku 5' (pen.); Godín 36'

RheinEnergieStadion, Cologne
Attendance: 0 (Note: The remainder of the competition, held in August 2020, was played behind closed doors due to the COVID-19 pandemic in Europe.)
Referee: Danny Makkelie (Netherlands)

=== 2019–20 UEFA Youth League ===
==== UEFA Champions League Path ====
===== Group A =====
Pos	Team	Pld	W	D	L	GF	GA	GD	Pts	Qualification	RMA	BRU	PAR	GAL
1	(Spain) Real Madrid	6	4	1	1	16	10	+6	13	Round of 16	—	3–0	6–3	2–4
2	(Belgium) Club Brugge	6	3	1	2	12	9	+3	10	Play-offs	2–2	—	2–0	3–2
3	(France) Paris Saint-Germain	6	2	0	4	10	15	−5	6 (Note: Ranked on head-to-head points: Paris Saint-Germain 6, Galatasaray 0.)		1–2	0–4	—	1–0
4	(Turkey) Galatasaray	6	2	0	4	9	13	−4	6		0–1	2–1	1–5	—

Source: UEFA

===== Group D =====
Pos	Team	Pld	W	D	L	GF	GA	GD	Pts	Qualification	JUV	ATM	LEV	LMO
1	(Italy) Juventus	6	5	0	1	17	4	+13	15	Round of 16	—	2–1	4–1	1–2
2	(Spain) Atlético Madrid	6	4	0	2	11	8	+3	12	Play-offs	0–4	—	2–0	3–0
3	(Germany) Bayer Leverkusen	6	1	1	4	6	16	−10	4 (Note: Ranked on head-to-head points: Bayer Leverkusen 4, Lokomotiv Moscow 1.)		0–5	0–2	—	2–2
4	(Russia) Lokomotiv Moscow	6	1	1	4	7	13	−6	4		0–1	2–3	1–3	—

Source: UEFA

===== Group F =====
Pos	Team	Pld	W	D	L	GF	GA	GD	Pts	Qualification	INT	DOR	SLP	BAR
1	(Italy) Inter Milan	6	4	0	2	15	7	+8	12 (Note: Tied on head-to-head points (3). Ranked on head-to-head goal difference: Inter Milan +2, Borussia Dortmund −2.)	Round of 16	—	4–1	4–0	2–0
2	(Germany) Borussia Dortmund	6	4	0	2	12	9	+3	12	Play-offs	2–1	—	5–1	2–1
3	(Czech Republic) Slavia Prague	6	3	0	3	9	16	−7	9		4–1	1–0	—	0–4
4	(Spain) Barcelona	6	1	0	5	8	12	−4	3		0–3	1–2	2–3	—

Source: UEFA

===== Group H =====
Pos	Team	Pld	W	D	L	GF	GA	GD	Pts	Qualification	AJX	LIL	CHE	VAL
1	(Netherlands) Ajax	6	3	2	1	13	7	+6	11	Round of 16	—	4–0	0–1	1–1
2	(France) Lille	6	3	1	2	7	8	−1	10	Play-offs	1–2	—	2–0	1–0
3	(England) Chelsea	6	1	3	2	7	9	−2	6		1–1	1–1	—	3–3
4	(Spain) Valencia	6	1	2	3	10	13	−3	5		3–5	1–2	2–1	—

Source: UEFA

==== Domestic Champions Path ====
===== First round =====
Team 1	Agg.	Team 2	1st leg	2nd leg
Zaragoza (Spain)	5–1	(Poland) Korona Kielce	1–0	4–1

===== Second round =====
Team 1	Agg.	Team 2	1st leg	2nd leg
Zaragoza (Spain)	9–0	(Cyprus) APOEL	5–0	4–0

==== Play-offs ====
Team 1	Score	Team 2
Zaragoza (Spain)	1–3	(France) Lyon
Rangers (Scotland)	0–4	(Spain) Atlético Madrid

==== Knockout phase ====
===== Round of 16 =====
Team 1	Score	Team 2
Ajax (Netherlands)	0–0 (6–5 p)	(Spain) Atlético Madrid
Juventus (Italy)	1–3	(Spain) Real Madrid

===== Quarter-finals =====
Team 1	Score	Team 2
Internazionale (Italy)	0–3	(Spain) Real Madrid

===== Semi-finals =====
Team 1	Score	Team 2
Red Bull Salzburg (Austria)	1–2	(Spain) Real Madrid

===== Final =====
The final, originally scheduled to be played on 20 April 2020 at Colovray Stadium, Nyon, was postponed due to concerns over the COVID-19 pandemic in Europe. It was rescheduled to 25 August 2020.

25 August 2020
18:00 UTC+2

Benfica (Portugal)	2–3	(Spain) Real Madrid
Ramos 49', 57'	Report	Rodríguez 26'; Jocú 45' (o.g.); Gutiérrez 50'

Colovray Stadium, Nyon
Attendance: 0 (Note: The remainder of the competition, held in August 2020, was played behind closed doors due to the COVID-19 pandemic in Europe.)
Referee: Chris Kavanagh (England)

=== 2019–20 UEFA Women's Champions League ===
==== Knockout phase ====
===== Round of 32 =====
Team 1	Agg.	Team 2	1st leg	2nd leg
Juventus (Italy)	1–4	(Spain) Barcelona	0–2	1–2
Spartak Subotica (Serbia)	3–4	(Spain) Atlético Madrid	2–3	1–1

===== Round of 16 =====
Team 1	Agg.	Team 2	1st leg	2nd leg
Barcelona (Spain)	8–1	(Belarus) FC Minsk	5–0	3–1
Manchester City (England)	2–3	(Spain) Atlético Madrid	1–1	1–2

===== Quarter-finals =====
Team 1	Score	Team 2
Atlético Madrid (Spain)	0–1	(Spain) Barcelona

===== Semi-finals =====
Team 1	Score	Team 2
VfL Wolfsburg (Germany)	1–0	(Spain) Barcelona

== Men's football ==
=== League season ===
==== La Liga ====
Pos	Team	Pld	W	D	L	GF	GA	GD	Pts	Qualification or relegation
1	Real Madrid (C)	38	26	9	3	70	25	+45	87	Qualification for the Champions League group stage
2	Barcelona	38	25	7	6	86	38	+48	82	Qualification for the Champions League group stage
3	Atlético Madrid	38	18	16	4	51	27	+24	70	Qualification for the Champions League group stage
4	Sevilla	38	19	13	6	54	34	+20	70	Qualification for the Champions League group stage
5	Villarreal	38	18	6	14	63	49	+14	60	Qualification for the Europa League group stage
6	Real Sociedad	38	16	8	14	56	48	+8	56	Qualification for the Europa League group stage
7	Granada	38	16	8	14	52	45	+7	56	Qualification for the Europa League second qualifying round (Note: The 2020 Copa del Rey Final was postponed due to the COVID-19 pandemic in Spain and could not be completed by the UEFA registration deadline of 3 August 2020, so the fifth- and sixth-placed teams in the 2019–20 La Liga, Villarreal and Real Sociedad, entered the 2020–21 UEFA Europa League at the group stage, and the seventh-placed team, Granada, entered at the second qualifying round.)
8	Getafe	38	14	12	12	43	37	+6	54	
9	Valencia	38	14	11	13	46	53	−7	53	
10	Osasuna	38	13	13	12	46	54	−8	52	
11	Athletic Bilbao	38	13	12	13	41	38	+3	51	
12	Levante	38	14	7	17	47	53	−6	49	
13	Valladolid	38	9	15	14	32	43	−11	42	
14	Eibar	38	11	9	18	39	56	−17	42	
15	Real Betis	38	10	11	17	48	60	−12	41	
16	Alavés	38	10	9	19	34	59	−25	39	
17	Celta Vigo	38	7	16	15	37	49	−12	37	
18	Leganés (R)	38	8	12	18	30	51	−21	36	Relegation to Segunda División
19	Mallorca (R)	38	9	6	23	40	65	−25	33	Relegation to Segunda División
20	Espanyol (R)	38	5	10	23	27	58	−31	25	Relegation to Segunda División

Source: La Liga, Soccerway
Rules for classification: 1) Points; 2) Head-to-head points; 3) Head-to-head goal difference; 4) Goal difference; 5) Goals scored; 6) Fair-play points (Note: Head-to-head record is used only after all the matches between the teams in question have been played)
(C) Champions; (R) Relegated

==== Segunda División ====
Pos	Team	Pld	W	D	L	GF	GA	GD	Pts	Promotion, qualification or relegation
1	Huesca (C, P)	42	21	7	14	55	42	+13	70	Promotion to La Liga
2	Cádiz (P)	42	19	12	11	50	39	+11	69	Promotion to La Liga
3	Zaragoza	42	18	11	13	59	53	+6	65	Qualification to promotion play-offs
4	Almería	42	17	13	12	62	43	+19	64	Qualification to promotion play-offs
5	Girona	42	17	12	13	48	43	+5	63	Qualification to promotion play-offs
6	Elche (O, P)	42	16	13	13	52	44	+8	61	Qualification to promotion play-offs
7	Rayo Vallecano	42	13	21	8	60	50	+10	60 (Note: Rayo Vallecano finished ahead of Fuenlabrada on head-to-head points: Fuenlabrada 2–2 Rayo Vallecano, Rayo Vallecano 1–0 Fuenlabrada.)	
8	Fuenlabrada	42	15	15	12	47	40	+7	60	
9	Las Palmas	42	14	15	13	49	46	+3	57	
10	Alcorcón	42	13	18	11	52	50	+2	57	
11	Mirandés	42	13	17	12	55	59	−4	56	
12	Tenerife	42	14	13	15	50	46	+4	55	
13	Sporting Gijón	42	14	12	16	40	38	+2	54	
14	Málaga	42	11	20	11	35	33	+2	53 (Note: Málaga finished ahead of Oviedo on head-to-head points: Málaga 2–1 Oviedo, Oviedo 1–1 Málaga.)	
15	Oviedo	42	13	14	15	49	53	−4	53	
16	Lugo	42	12	16	14	43	54	−11	52 (Note: Lugo finished ahead of Albacete on head-to-head points: Albacete 0–1 Lugo, Lugo 1–0 Albacete.)	
17	Albacete	42	13	13	16	36	46	−10	52	
18	Ponferradina	42	12	15	15	45	50	−5	51 (Note: Ponferradina finished ahead of Deportivo La Coruña on head-to-head goal difference: Ponferradina 2–0 Deportivo La Coruña, Deportivo La Coruña 2–1 Ponferradina.)	
19	Deportivo La Coruña (R)	42	12	15	15	43	60	−17	51	Relegation to Segunda División B
20	Numancia (R)	42	13	11	18	45	53	−8	50	Relegation to Segunda División B
21	Extremadura (R)	42	10	13	19	43	59	−16	43	Relegation to Segunda División B
22	Racing Santander (R)	42	5	18	19	39	56	−17	33	Relegation to Segunda División B

Source: LaLiga Soccerway
Rules for classification: 1) points; 2) head-to-head points; 3) head-to-head goal difference; 4) goal difference; 5) number of goals scored
(C) Champions; (O) Play-off winners; (P) Promoted; (R) Relegated

===== Promotion play-offs =====
Semi-finals
Elche	0	1	1
Zaragoza	0	0	0
Girona	1	2	3
Almería	0	1	1

Final
Elche	0	1	1
Girona	0	0	0

==== Segunda División B ====
Group 1
Pos	Team	Pld	Pts
1	Atlético Baleares	28	58
2	Ibiza	28	56
3	Atlético Madrid B	28	53
4	Peña Deportiva	28	45
5	Coruxo	28	41
6	Rayo Majadahonda	28	41
7	Real Madrid Castilla	28	40
8	Internacional	28	40
9	Pontevedra	28	38
10	Langreo	28	38
11	Racing Ferrol	28	37
12	Oviedo B	28	37
13	Melilla	28	36
14	Celta Vigo B	28	35
15	Sporting Gijón B	28	34
16	Las Palmas Atlético	28	34
17	Las Rozas	28	33
18	Marino Luanco	28	32
19	Getafe B	28	28
20	San Sebastián de los Reyes	28	19

Source: BDFútbol

Group 1
Pos	Team	Pld	Pts
1	Las Rozas	28	33
2	Recreativo	28	33
3	Don Benito	28	32
4	Marino Luanco	28	32
5	Unionistas	28	31
6	Real Unión	28	29
7	Ejea	28	27
8	Prat	28	26

Source: RFEF – Tournament rules: Copa Federación

Group 2
Pos	Team	Pld	Pts
1	UD Logroñés (O, P)	28	62
2	Cultural Leonesa	28	49
3	Athletic Bilbao B	28	49
4	Valladolid Promesas	28	47
5	Real Sociedad B	28	44
6	Amorebieta	28	42
7	Osasuna B	28	40
8	Burgos	28	39
9	Guijuelo	28	37
10	Haro	28	36
11	Alavés B	28	34
12	Calahorra	28	34
13	Salamanca	28	34
14	Barakaldo	28	32
15	Leioa	28	31
16	Unionistas	28	31
17	Real Unión	28	29
18	Arenas	28	28
19	Izarra	28	28
20	Tudelano	28	24

Source: BDFútbol
(O) Play-off winners;
(P) Promoted

Group 2
Pos	Team	Pld	Pts
1	Las Rozas	28	33
2	Recreativo	28	33
3	Don Benito	28	32
4	Marino Luanco	28	32
5	Unionistas	28	31
6	Real Unión	28	29
7	Ejea	28	27
8	Prat	28	26

Source: RFEF – Tournament rules: Copa Federación

Group 3
Pos	Team	Pld	Pts
1	Castellón (P)	28	50
2	Barcelona B	28	49
3	Sabadell (P)	28	49
4	Cornellà	28	49
5	Lleida Esportiu	28	46
6	Villarreal B	28	46
7	Olot	28	44
8	Espanyol B	28	42
9	Andorra	28	41
10	La Nucía	28	39
11	Ebro	28	37
12	Atlético Levante	28	35
13	Llagostera	28	33
14	Gimnàstic	28	31
15	Ejea	28	27
16	Valencia Mestalla	28	26
17	Prat	28	26
18	Hércules	28	25
19	Badalona	28	24
20	Orihuela	28	23

Source: BDFútbol
(P) Promoted

Group 3
Pos	Team	Pld	Pts
1	Las Rozas	28	33
2	Recreativo	28	33
3	Don Benito	28	32
4	Marino Luanco	28	32
5	Unionistas	28	31
6	Real Unión	28	29
7	Ejea	28	27
8	Prat	28	26

Source: RFEF – Tournament rules: Copa Federación

Group 4
Pos	Team	Pld	Pts
1	Cartagena (O, P)	28	54
2	Marbella	28	53
3	Badajoz	28	49
4	Yeclano	28	47
5	Córdoba	28	45
6	San Fernando	28	44
7	Linense	28	41
8	Murcia	28	39
9	Sevilla Atlético	28	36
10	UCAM Murcia	28	36
11	Cádiz B	28	36
12	Villarrubia	28	35
13	Recreativo	28	33
14	Don Benito	28	32
15	Atlético Sanluqueño	28	30
16	Algeciras	28	29
17	Talavera de la Reina	28	29
18	Recreativo Granada	28	29
19	Mérida	28	27
20	Villarrobledo	28	22

Source: BDFútbol
(O) Play-off winners;
(P) Promoted

Group 4
Pos	Team	Pld	Pts
1	Las Rozas	28	33
2	Recreativo	28	33
3	Don Benito	28	32
4	Marino Luanco	28	32
5	Unionistas	28	31
6	Real Unión	28	29
7	Ejea	28	27
8	Prat	28	26

Source: RFEF – Tournament rules: Copa Federación

=== Cup competitions ===
==== Copa del Rey ====
===== Final =====
3 April 2021
21:30 CEST

Athletic Bilbao	0–1	Real Sociedad
	Report	Oyarzabal 63' (pen.)

La Cartuja, Seville
Attendance: 0 (Note: The match was played behind closed doors due to the COVID-19 pandemic in Spain.)
Referee: Xavier Estrada Fernández (Catalonia)

==== Supercopa de España ====
===== Final =====
12 January 2020
21:00

Real Madrid	0–0 (a.e.t.)	Atlético Madrid
	Report
Penalties
Carvajal (penalty scored); Rodrygo (penalty scored); Modrić (penalty scored); Ramos (penalty scored)	4–1	(penalty missed) Saúl; (penalty missed) Partey; (penalty scored) Trippier

King Abdullah Sports City, Jeddah
Attendance: 59,053
Referee: José María Sánchez Martínez (Murcia)

==== Copa Federación de España ====
===== Final =====
5 December
20:00

Murcia (3)	1–1 (a.e.t.)	Tudelano (3)
Toril 61'	Report	Diego Suárez 6'
Penalties
	4–2

Enrique Roca, Murcia
Attendance: 6,074
Referee: Morena Llorens

== Women's football ==
=== League season ===
==== Primera División ====
Pos	Team	Pld	W	D	L	GF	GA	GD	Pts	Qualification or relegation
1	Barcelona (C)	21	19	2	0	86	6	+80	59	Qualification for the UEFA Champions League
2	Atlético de Madrid	21	15	5	1	43	17	+26	50	Qualification for the UEFA Champions League
3	Levante	21	14	3	4	40	21	+19	45	
4	Deportivo	21	11	4	6	46	38	+8	37	
5	Athletic Club	21	10	5	6	30	23	+7	35	
6	Real Sociedad	21	9	6	6	33	26	+7	33	
7	Logroño	21	8	5	8	31	41	−10	29	
8	Rayo Vallecano	21	7	7	7	24	33	−9	28	
9	Granadilla	21	6	6	9	24	35	−11	24	
10	Tacón	21	6	5	10	33	48	−15	23	
11	Sevilla	21	6	4	11	25	33	−8	22	
12	Betis	21	4	8	9	25	33	−8	20	
13	Madrid CFF	21	5	4	12	22	45	−23	19	
14	Sporting de Huelva	21	5	3	13	13	36	−23	18	
15	Valencia	21	3	8	10	21	28	−7	17	~~Relegation to Segunda División~~ (Note: Due to the COVID-19 pandemic in Spain, no teams were relegated.)
16	Espanyol	21	0	5	16	13	46	−33	5	~~Relegation to Segunda División~~

Source: RFEF
Rules for classification: 1) points; 2) head-to-head points; 3) goal difference; 4) number of goals scored
(C) Champions

==== Segunda División ====
Group North
Pos	Team	Pld	Pts
1	Athletic Bilbao B (I)	22	48
2	Eibar (P)	22	46
3	Barcelona B	22	45
4	Osasuna	22	41
5	Alavés	22	41
6	Seagull	22	35
7	AEM	22	35
8	Zaragoza CFF	22	32
9	Oviedo	22	31
10	Parquesol	22	28
11	Madrid CFF B	22	26
12	Atlético Madrid B	22	26
13	Racing Santander	22	25
14	Friol	22	19
15	Pozuelo de Alarcón	22	13
16	Sporting Gijón	22	8

Source: RFEF
(I) ?;
(P) Promoted

Group South
Pos	Team	Pld	Pts
1	Santa Teresa (P)	22	51
2	Granada	22	50
3	Fundación Albacete	22	47
4	Villarreal	22	42
5	Málaga	22	36
6	Alhama	22	35
7	Pozoalbense	22	32
8	Córdoba	22	31
9	Cáceres	22	30
10	Granadilla B	22	28
11	Femarguín	22	27
12	Levante B	22	24
13	Valencia B	22	21
14	Juan Grande	22	16
15	Tacuense	22	12
16	Collerense	22	9

Source: RFEF
(P) Promoted

=== Cup competitions ===
==== Supercopa de España ====
===== Final =====
9 February 2020
12:00

Real Sociedad	1–10	Barcelona
Manu 63'	Report	Torrejón 5', 33', 56', 78'; Putellas 7', 44'; Oshoala 35', 51'; Hansen 37'; Andújar 75'

Helmántico Stadium, Villares de la Reina
Attendance: 9,217
Referee: Marta Huerta de Aza
