= Dumitrița (name) =

Dumitrița is a feminine Romanian given name.

Notable people with the given name include:

- Dumitrița Prisăcari (born 1994), Moldovan footballer
- Dumitrița Turner (born 1964), Romanian artistic gymnast
