= UEFA Women's Euro 2022 qualifying Group D =

Soccer competition

Group D of the UEFA Women's Euro 2022 qualifying competition consists of five teams: Spain, Czech Republic, Poland, Moldova, and Azerbaijan. The composition of the nine groups in the qualifying group stage was decided by the draw held on 21 February 2019, 13:30 CET (UTC+1), at the UEFA headquarters in Nyon, Switzerland. with the teams seeded according to their coefficient ranking.

The group is played in home-and-away round-robin format between August 2019 and December 2020. The group winners and the three best runners-up among all nine groups (not counting results against the sixth-placed team) qualify directly for the final tournament, while the remaining six runners-up advance to the play-offs.

On 17 March 2020, all matches were put on hold due to the COVID-19 pandemic.

== Standings ==
| Pos | Team | Pld | W | D | L | GF | GA | GD | Pts | Qualification | Spain | Czech Republic | Poland | Moldova | Azerbaijan |
|---|---|---|---|---|---|---|---|---|---|---|---|---|---|---|---|
| 1 | Spain | 8 | 7 | 1 | 0 | 48 | 1 | +47 | 22 | Final tournament | — | 4–0 | 3–0 | 10–0 | 4–0 |
| 2 | Czech Republic | 8 | 5 | 1 | 2 | 24 | 9 | +15 | 16 | Play-offs | 1–5 | — | 0–0 | 7–0 | 3–0 |
| 3 | Poland | 8 | 4 | 2 | 2 | 16 | 5 | +11 | 14 | | 0–0 | 0–2 | — | 5–0 | 3–0 |
| 4 | Moldova | 8 | 1 | 0 | 7 | 3 | 43 | −40 | 3 (Note: Ranked on head-to-head goal difference: Moldova +1, Azerbaijan -1.) | | 0–9 | 0–7 | 0–3 | — | 3–1 |
| 5 | Azerbaijan | 8 | 1 | 0 | 7 | 2 | 35 | −33 | 3 | | 0–13 | 0–4 | 0–5 | 1–0 | — |

Source: UEFA
Rules for classification: Tiebreakers

== Matches ==
Times are CET/CEST, (Note: CEST (UTC+2) for dates between 31 March and 26 October 2019 and between 29 March and 24 October 2020, and CET (UTC+1) for all other dates.) as listed by UEFA (local times, if different, are in parentheses).

30 August 2019
18:00 (19:00 EEST)

| Moldova | 0–7 | Czech Republic |
|---|---|---|
| | Report | Svitková 28' (pen.), 38'; Bertholdová 41'; L. Martínková 49'; Cahynová 53'; Stašková 73'; Voňková 85' |

Zimbru Stadium, Chișinău
Attendance: 370
Referee: Jelena Cvetković (Serbia)

4 October 2019
21:30

| Spain | 4–0 | Azerbaijan |
|---|---|---|
| Guijarro 8'; Virginia 26'; Bonmatí 54', 76' | Report |

Estadio Riazor, A Coruña
Attendance: 10,444
Referee: Paula Brady (Republic of Ireland)

8 October 2019
19:00

| Czech Republic | 1–5 | Spain |
|---|---|---|
| Voňková 89' | Report | Sedláčková 7' (o.g.); Mariona 11'; Bonmatí 23'; Paredes 35'; Hermoso 79' |

Ďolíček, Prague
Attendance: 1,895
Referee: Tess Olofsson (Sweden)

7 November 2019
16:00 (19:00 AZT)

| Azerbaijan | 0–4 | Czech Republic |
|---|---|---|
| | Report | Voňková 36', 69'; Stašková 60'; Dubcová 73' |

Bayil Arena, Baku
Attendance: 550
Referee: Maria Marotta (Italy)

10 November 2019
15:00 (16:00 EET)

| Moldova | 3–1 | Azerbaijan |
|---|---|---|
| Țabur 24'; Munteanu 50' (pen.), 62' (pen.) | Report | Dorofeeva 39' |

Zimbru Stadium, Chișinău
Attendance: 1,195
Referee: Katalin Sipos (Hungary)

12 November 2019
18:00

| Poland | 0–0 | Spain |
|---|---|---|
| | Report |

Arena Lublin, Lublin
Attendance: 7,528
Referee: Frida Nielsen (Denmark)

7 March 2020
18:00

| Poland | 5–0 | Moldova |
|---|---|---|
| Sikora 9'; Pajor 27', 34', 86'; Daleszczyk 45+2' | Report |

Polonia Stadium, Warsaw
Attendance: 2,326
Referee: Lizzy van Der Helm (Netherlands)

11 March 2020
15:00 (18:00 AZT)

| Azerbaijan | 0–5 | Poland |
|---|---|---|
| | Report | Pajor 19', 90+1'; Sikora 44', 90+3'; Tarczyńska 90' |

ASK Arena, Baku
Attendance: 97
Referee: Cristina Trandafir (Romania)

18 September 2020 (Note: The Czech Republic v Poland match, originally scheduled for 3 September 2019, 17:30 CEST, at Městský fotbalový stadion Miroslava Valenty, Uherské Hradiště, was postponed on 2 September 2019 due to food poisoning in the Czech Republic squad. The match will instead be played on 18 September 2020.)
18:15

| Czech Republic | 0–0 | Poland |
|---|---|---|
| | Report |

Letní stadion, Chomutov
Attendance: 0
Referee: Shona Shukrula (Netherlands)

19 September 2020
19:00 (20:00 EEST)

| Moldova | 0–9 | Spain |
|---|---|---|
| | Report | L. García 6', 38'; Sivolobova 9' (o.g.); Mariona 27', 53', 81' (pen.); Hermoso 35'; Redondo 50'; Guijarro 76' |

Zimbru Stadium, Chișinău
Attendance: 0
Referee: Jelena Pejković (Croatia)

22 September 2020
18:00

| Poland | 0–2 | Czech Republic |
|---|---|---|
| | Report | Stašková 28'; Dubcová 70' |

Stadion Miejski, Bielsko-Biała
Attendance: 0
Referee: Iuliana Demetrescu (Romania)

23 October 2020 (Note: All matches originally scheduled to be played in April and June 2020 were postponed due to the COVID-19 pandemic in Europe. These matches were subsequently rescheduled to be played between October and December 2020.)
17:00

| Poland | 3–0 | Azerbaijan |
|---|---|---|
| Mesjasz 41'; Zawistowska 47', 65' | Report |

Polonia Stadium, Warsaw
Attendance: 0
Referee: Tanja Subotič (Slovenia)
23 October 2020
21:00

| Spain | 4–0 | Czech Republic |
|---|---|---|
| Esther 1'; Guijarro 25'; Bonmatí 34'; Alexia 53' | Report |

La Cartuja, Seville
Attendance: 432
Referee: Sara Persson (Sweden)

27 October 2020
14:00 (15:00 EET)

| Moldova | 0–3 | Poland |
|---|---|---|
| | Report | Dudek 16'; Achcińska 40' (pen.); Kopińska 71' |

Zimbru Stadium, Chișinău
Attendance: 0
Referee: Ivana Projkovska (North Macedonia)
27 October 2020
17:00

| Czech Republic | 3–0 | Azerbaijan |
|---|---|---|
| Cahynová 27'; Krejčiříková 52'; Szewieczková 64' | Report |

Letní stadion, Chomutov
Attendance: 0
Referee: Eszter Urbán (Hungary)

27 November 2020
21:00

| Spain | 10–0 | Moldova |
|---|---|---|
| Bonmatí 7', 30'; Hermoso 13', 25', 87' (pen.); Mariona 28' (pen.); Prisăcari 45+2' (o.g.); Alexia 57'; Guijarro 71'; E. Navarro 84' | Report |

La Ciudad del Fútbol, Las Rozas de Madrid
Attendance: 0
Referee: Shona Shukrula (Netherlands)

1 December 2020
15:00

| Czech Republic | 7–0 | Moldova |
|---|---|---|
| Stašková 14', 54'; Cahynová 17'; Petříková 26'; Svitková 36'; K. Dubcová 43'; Mrázová 90+3' | Report |

Letní stadion, Chomutov
Attendance: 0
Referee: Florence Guillemin (France)

18 February 2021
17:00 (20:00 AZT)

| Azerbaijan | 0–13 | Spain |
|---|---|---|
| | Report | Esther 21', 24', 30', 31', 87'; Hermoso 33', 43', 67', 82', 90+3'; Mariona 57'; E. Navarro 75'; Eizagirre 84' |

ASK Arena, Baku
Attendance: 0
Referee: Maria Marotta (Italy)

23 February 2021
15:00 (18:00 AZT)

| Azerbaijan | 1–0 | Moldova |
|---|---|---|
| A. Aliyeva 46' | Report |

ASK Arena, Baku
Attendance: 0
Referee: Iuliana Demetrescu (Romania)
23 February 2021
19:00

| Spain | 3–0 | Poland |
|---|---|---|
| Esther 24', 69'; Mapi León 87' | Report |

La Ciudad del Fútbol, Las Rozas de Madrid
Attendance: 0
Referee: Anastasia Pustovoitova (Russia)

== Goalscorers ==
There have been 92 goals scored in 20 matches, for an average of 4.6 goals per match (as of 23 February 2021).

10 goals

- (Spain) Jennifer Hermoso

8 goals

- (Spain) Esther González

6 goals

- (Spain) Aitana Bonmatí
- (Spain) Mariona Caldentey

5 goals

- (Czech Republic) Andrea Stašková
- (Poland) Ewa Pajor

4 goals

- (Czech Republic) Lucie Voňková
- (Spain) Patricia Guijarro

3 goals

- (Czech Republic) Klára Cahynová
- (Czech Republic) Kamila Dubcová
- (Czech Republic) Kateřina Svitková
- (Poland) Aleksandra Sikora

2 goals

- (Moldova) Natalia Munteanu
- (Poland) Weronika Zawistowska
- (Spain) Lucía García
- (Spain) Eva Navarro
- (Spain) Alexia Putellas

1 goal

- (Azerbaijan) Aysun Aliyeva
- (Azerbaijan) Alina Dorofeeva
- (Czech Republic) Petra Bertholdová
- (Czech Republic) Tereza Krejčiříková
- (Czech Republic) Lucie Martínková
- (Czech Republic) Miroslava Mrázová
- (Czech Republic) Jana Sedláčková
- (Czech Republic) Tereza Szewieczková
- (Moldova) Carolina Țabur
- (Poland) Adriana Achcińska
- (Poland) Katarzyna Daleszczyk
- (Poland) Paulina Dudek
- (Poland) Dominika Kopińska
- (Poland) Małgorzata Mesjasz
- (Poland) Agata Tarczyńska
- (Spain) Nerea Eizagirre
- (Spain) Mapi León
- (Spain) Irene Paredes
- (Spain) Alba Redondo
- (Spain) Virginia Torrecilla

1 own goal

- (Czech Republic) Jana Sedláčková (against Spain)
- (Moldova) Dumitrița Prisăcari (against Spain)
- (Moldova) Anastasia Sivolobova (against Spain)
