= Abelardo =

- Gender: Male

Origin
- Origin: italy
- Meaning: Breath

Other names
- See also: Abelard

Abelardo is a masculine given name. It is an Italian form of the name Abelard. Sometimes used as a variant of Abel.

== As a given name ==
- Abelardo Aguilar, Filipino doctor and researcher
- Abelardo Aguilú Jr. (c. 1870–c. 1940), Puerto Rican politician
- Abelardo Albisi (1872–1938), Italian musician and composer
- Abelardo Alvarado Alcántara (1933–2021) Mexican Catholic prelate
- Abelardo Díaz Alfaro (1916–1999), Puerto Rican author
- Abelardo Ávila (1907–1967), Mexican engraver
- Abelardo Barroso (1905–1972), Cuban singer
- Abelardo Castro (born 1892, death date unknown), Chilean fencer
- Abelardo Castillo (1935–2017), Argentine author
- Abelardo Delgado (1931–2004), American writer, community organizer, and poet
- Abelardo de la Espriella (born 1978), president of Colombia
- Abelardo Estorino (1925–2013), Cuban stage director
- Abelardo Fernández (born 1970), Spanish footballer and manager
- Abelardo Gandía (born 1977), Spanish paralympic cyclist
- Abelardo Lafuente García-Rojo (1871–1931), Spanish architect
- Abelardo González (1944–2021), Spanish footballer
- Abelardo Colomé Ibarra, Cuban politician
- Abelardo Menéndez (1928–1995), Cuban fencer
- Abelardo Montalvo (1876–1950), former President of Eduador
- Abelardo Morell (born 1948), Cuban-American photographer
- Abelardo Olivier (1877–1951), Italian fencer
- Abelardo Pacheco (born 1939), Cuban long jumper
- Abelardo Escobar Prieto, Mexican politician
- Abelardo Quinteros (born 1923), Chilean composer
- Abelardo Raidi (1914–2002), Venezuelan sportswriter and radio broadcaster
- Abelardo Rico (born 1889, death date unknown), Argentine sports shooter
- Abelardo Ríos (born 1952), Colombian racing cyclist
- Abelardo L. Rodríguez, President of Mexico
- Abelardo Gamarra Rondó (1852–1924), Peruvian writer, composer, and journalist
- Abelardo Rondón (born 1964), Colombian racing cyclist
- Abelardo Saavedra, American school district superintendent
- Abelardo Sztrum (born 1974), Argentine sprint canoer
- Abelardo Rodríguez Urdaneta (1870–1933), Dominican sculper, painter, and educator
- Abelardo L. Valdez, American lawyer and politician
- Abelardo Vicioso (1930–2004), Dominican politician, lawyer, and poet
- Abelardo Villalpando (1909–1997), Bolivian politician

== As a surname ==
- Nicanor Abelardo (1893–1934), Filipino composer
- Richard Abelardo, Filipino film director

== Fictional characters ==
- Abelardo Montoya, character on Plaza Sésamo
- Abelardo the Dragon, earlier version of the above
