= Bass flute =

Large low-pitched flute an octave below the standard flute

Bass Flute
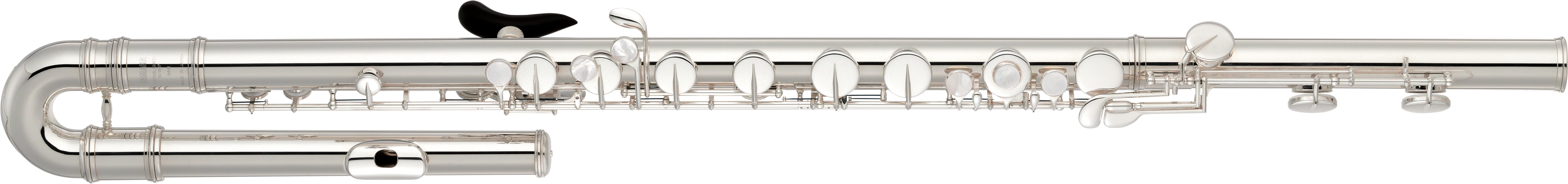

Woodwind instrument
- Classification: Woodwind; Wind; Aerophone
- Hornbostel–Sachs classification: 421.121.12-71 (Side-blown Aerophone with tone holes and keys)

Playing range
- Tessitura of the bass flute is C_{3}–A_{5}, sounding one octave lower than written.

Related instruments
- Flutes: Piccolo; Treble; Soprano; C flute; Flûte d'amour; Alto; Bass; Contra-alto; Contrabass; Subcontrabass; Double Contrabass; Hyperbass

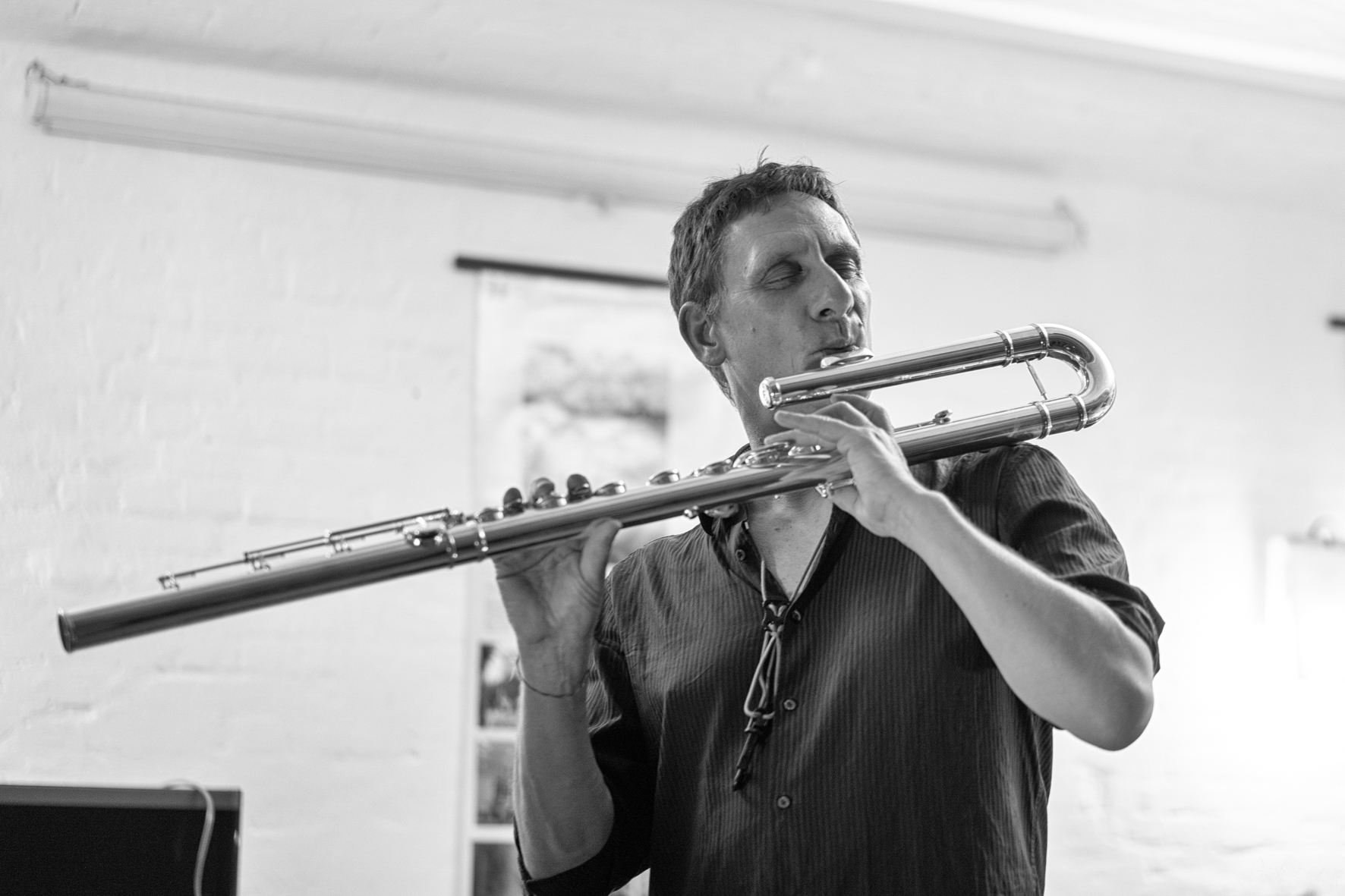
A horizontal bass flute being played by Frank Gratkowski.

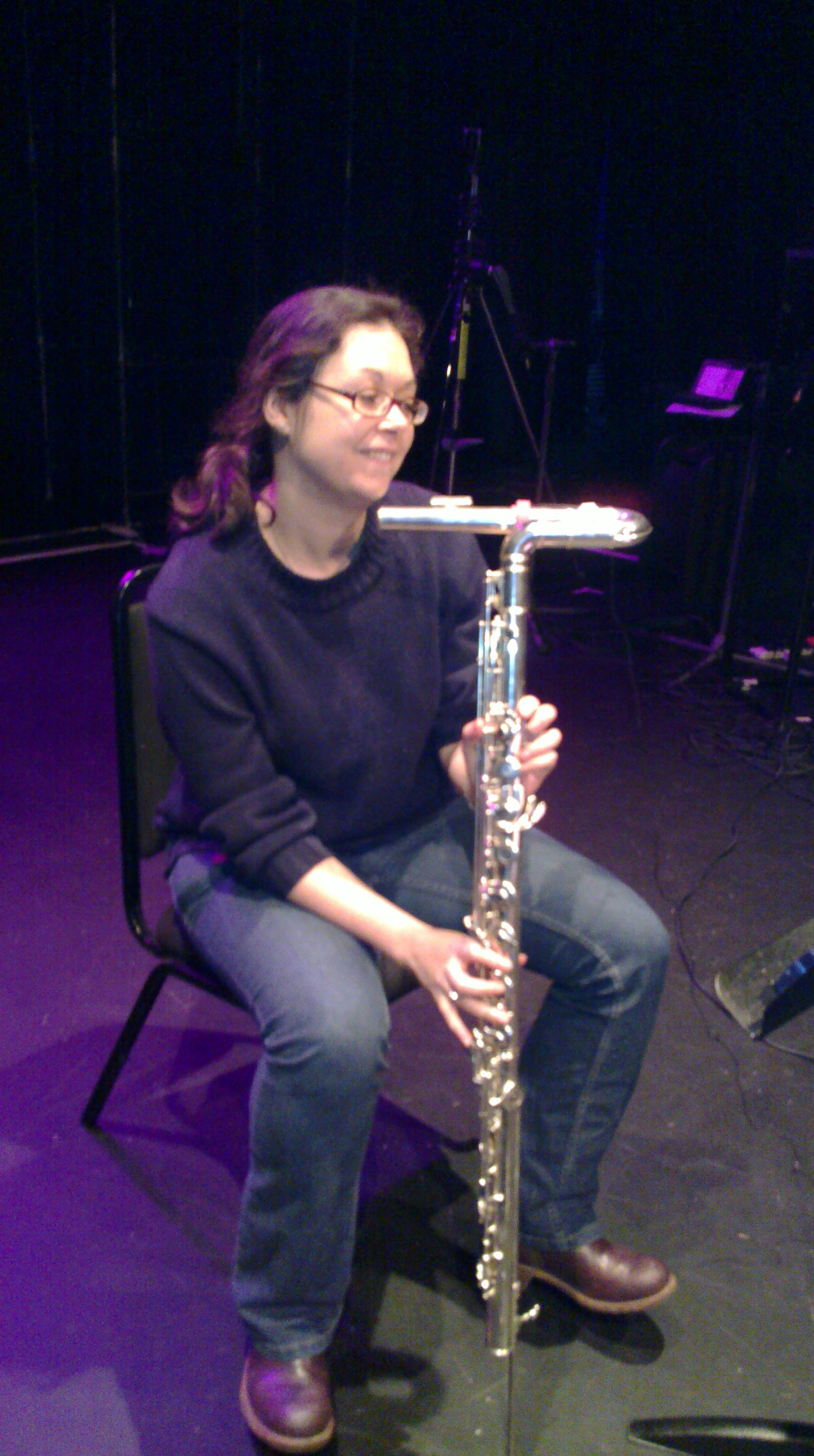
An upright bass flute being played by Carla Rees

The bass flute is a member of the flute family pitched one octave below the concert flute. The tubing length is twice as long at 146 cm (57 in), which requires a J-shaped head joint to bring the embouchure hole within reach of the player. Despite its name, its lowest note of C_{3} or B_{2} places its lowest octave only in the tenor range. Its soft dynamic range means in large ensembles it is easily obscured unless amplified or lightly scored; however its unique timbre in the low register can be very effective, especially in solo works, small ensembles, and flute choirs. The "bass flute in F" produced by Kotato & Fukushima is a contra-alto flute.

== Alternative terminology ==
Prior to the mid-20th century, the term "bass flute" was sometimes used, especially in Great Britain, to refer to the alto flute; for example, the part for "bass flute in G" in Holst's The Planets, and many works by Britten. In 1910, Abelardo Albisi invented a bass flute known as the albisiphone which was used in scores by Mascagni and Zandonai among other composers during the first half of the 20th century.

== Range and construction ==
The instrument's sounding range is from C_{3} (or B_{2} if a B Foot Joint), one octave below middle C, to C_{6}, two octaves above middle C. Bass flute music sounds an octave lower than it is written, which is the typical concert flute range (C_{4} to C_{7}). Notes written above A_{6} are not often used as they are difficult to produce and have inferior tone unless the instrument is tapered through the curve. Because manufacturers do not taper the flute body through the curve, intonation of all notes beginning with written D_{6} and higher tends to be sharp. The player can bend them in tune with the embouchure, or use alternative fingerings.

Bass flutes often have a C foot rather than the B foot common to other flutes. The shorter tube reduces acoustic resistance, which quickens the response and makes the tone brighter, livelier, and more resonant. The shorter tube also makes the instrument somewhat lighter and less fatiguing for the player to hold.

Bass flutes are most often made with silver-plated bodies and head joints. Most basses come with trill keys which allow the player to stabilize some otherwise unstable middle register notes as well as trill between otherwise impossible notes. Kotato basses have addressed the weight problem of bass flutes by designing a graphite rod that screws onto the underside of the instrument and then rests on the chair seat between the player's legs. Adjustable rods have also been developed by Jeff Amos. Other manufacturers have added a left hand thumb support called a crutch, which helps some players with physical control of the instrument. Dutch flute maker Eva Kingma has created a vertical design for the bass flute which allows the weight of the instrument to be supported by the floor.

== Repertoire ==
Many composers are beginning to write more pieces for the bass flute. These include Katherine Hoover's Two for Two, Bill Douglas's Karuna, Sophie Lacaze's Archelogos II, Mike Mower's Obstinato and Scareso, Gary Schocker's A Small Sonata for a Large Flute, Lorenzo Ferrero's Ellipse and Shadow Lines, Sonny Burnett's Stone Suite, Catherine McMichael's Baikal Journey and Ennio Morricone's Secrets of the Sahara. Other important works include Tristan Murail's Ethers for solo bass flute and small ensemble, Brian Ferneyhough's Mnemosyne for bass flute and tape, Mario Lavista's Lamento a la muerte de Raúl Lavista for solo bass flute, Michael Oliva's Moss Garden also for bass flute and tape, John Palmer's Inwards for bass flute and live-electronics, She Cried by Shiva Feshareki, and Marc Tweedie's Zoli, written for renowned flautist Carla Rees. Studies and concert etudes are beginning to appear that address the instrument's many challenges (physical balance, finger technique, air stream, overblowing, etc.). Low flute specialist Peter Sheridan has commissioned and arranged new compositions in this area, including a set of 'Etudes for Low Flutes' by Hilary Taggart. The sixth movement of Claude Bolling's Suite for Flute and Jazz Piano Trio, 'Versatile' has the soloist playing the opening melody on a bass flute. Morton Feldman's composition "Crippled Symmetry" has a part for the bass flute, as does John Cage's late work "Seven2". Hans Pfitzner's 1917 opera Palestrina features an early (true) C bass flute part. Another piece featuring the bass flute is John Mackey's "The Frozen Cathedral" (2013) in two separate sections of the piece.

For an extensive list of repertoire for bass flute and contrabass flute see Repertoire Catalogue for Piccolo, Alto Flute and Bass Flute (2004) by Peter van Munster (Roma: Riverberi Sonori). Selected repertoire graded into ability levels with short descriptions and information about basses can be found in The Alto and Bass Flute Resource Guide published by Falls House Press, and specialist low flutes publishing company Tetractys has a growing catalogue of works for bass flute.

== Other use ==
A handful of jazz musicians have used the bass flute, including flutist Jeremy Steig, beginning with his 1975 album Temple of Birth, saxophonists Henry Threadgill, Brian Landrus, and James Carter, and drummer Ronald Shannon Jackson who occasionally played bass flute as a second instrument. Hubert Laws features the bass flute on his recording of "Amazing Grace", in which he plays the first verse on bass flute, the second on alto, and the third on soprano. Steig later took up the Kotato & Fukushima bass flute in F.

In electronic music, Jack Dangers has sometimes used bass flute as the leader of the Meat Beat Manifesto.

A bass flute is heard throughout George Bruns' score for The Jungle Book and the original Pirates of the Caribbean attraction.

Perhaps the best-known work to feature the bass flute is the album Wave by Antônio Carlos Jobim.

The soundtrack of Guerrilla Games' Horizon Forbidden West features bass flute prominently, such as in "By The Cold Light of Stars", "As Certain as Stone" and "These Stones Unturned".
