= 2019–20 La Liga =

89th season of La Liga

La Liga
- Season: 2019–20
- Dates: 16 August 2019 – 19 July 2020
- Champions: Real Madrid; 34th title
- Relegated: Leganés; Mallorca; Espanyol
- Champions League: Real Madrid; Barcelona; Atlético Madrid; Sevilla
- Europa League: Villarreal; Real Sociedad; Granada
- Matches: 380
- Goals: 942 (2.48 per match)
- Top goalscorer: Lionel Messi (25 goals)
- Best goalkeeper: Thibaut Courtois (0.59 goals/match)
- Biggest home win: Celta Vigo 6–0 Alavés (21 June 2020)
- Biggest away win: Osasuna 0–5 Atlético Madrid (17 June 2020); Alavés 0–5 Barcelona (19 July 2020)
- Highest scoring: Villarreal 4–4 Granada (17 August 2019)
- Longest winning run: Real Madrid (10 matches)
- Longest unbeaten run: Atlético Madrid (16 matches)
- Longest winless run: Athletic Bilbao; Espanyol (10 matches)
- Longest losing run: Espanyol (8 matches)
- Highest attendance: 93,426; Barcelona 0–0 Real Madrid (18 December 2019)
- Lowest attendance: 5,341; Eibar 3–0 Granada (20 December 2019)
- Attendance: 4,630,608 (12,186 per match)

The 2019–20 La Liga season, also known as LaLiga Santander for sponsorship reasons, was the 89th since its establishment. The season began on 16 August 2019 and was originally scheduled to conclude on 24 May 2020.

Barcelona were the two-time defending champions, after winning their 26th title in the previous season. Osasuna, Granada and Mallorca joined as the promoted clubs from the 2018–19 Segunda División. They replaced Rayo Vallecano, Huesca and Girona, who were relegated to the 2019–20 Segunda División.

On 12 March 2020, both La Liga and the Segunda División were suspended for at least two weeks due to the COVID-19 pandemic. The league became suspended indefinitely on 23 March. The season recommenced on 11 June, with matches being played every single day until 13 July; all games in the penultimate round were held on 16 July, with all final round matches being played on 19 July.

On 16 July, Real Madrid secured a record-extending 34th league title in their penultimate match of the season, following their 2–1 victory against Villarreal.

== Teams ==
=== Promotion and relegation (pre-season) ===
A total of 20 teams contested the league, including 17 sides from the 2018–19 season and three promoted from the 2018–19 Segunda División. This included the two top teams from the Segunda División, and the winners of the play-offs.

Teams relegated to Segunda Division

The first team to be relegated from La Liga were Rayo Vallecano. Their relegation was ensured on 5 May 2019, after Valladolid beat Athletic Bilbao 1–0, suffering an immediate return to the Segunda División. The second team to be relegated were Huesca, who were also relegated on 5 May 2019 after a 2–6 home defeat to Valencia, also suffering an immediate return to the second tier. The third and final relegated club were Girona, who concluded their two-year stay in La Liga in a 1–2 away loss at Alavés on 18 May 2019.

Teams promoted from Segunda División

Osasuna (on 20 May 2019) and Granada (on 4 June 2019) were the two teams directly promoted from Segunda División, both after a two-year absence. The third and final team to earn promotion to La Liga was play-offs winner Mallorca, after coming back from a 2-goal deficit against Deportivo La Coruña on 23 June 2019. Mallorca returned after a six-year absence from Spain's top flight, spending one of those years in the Segunda División B and achieving two consecutive promotions.

=== Stadiums and locations ===
Location of teams in 2019–20 La Liga
Location of Community of Madrid teams in 2019–20 La Liga

Team	Location	Stadium	Capacity
Alavés	Vitoria-Gasteiz	Mendizorrotza	19,840
Athletic Bilbao	Bilbao	San Mamés	53,289
Atlético Madrid	Madrid	Wanda Metropolitano	68,456
Barcelona	Barcelona	Camp Nou	99,354
Celta Vigo	Vigo	Abanca-Balaídos	29,000
Eibar	Eibar	Ipurua	8,164
Espanyol	Barcelona	RCDE Stadium	40,000
Getafe	Getafe	Coliseum Alfonso Pérez	17,393
Granada	Granada	Nuevo Los Cármenes	19,336
Leganés	Leganés	Butarque	12,450
Levante	Valencia	Ciutat de València	26,354
Levante	Valencia	Camilo Cano, at La Nucía (Note: Stadium used for games behind closed doors due to renovation works at their main stadium.)	3,000
Mallorca	Palma	Visit Mallorca Stadium	24,262
Osasuna	Pamplona	El Sadar	18,570
Real Betis	Seville	Benito Villamarín	60,721
Real Madrid	Madrid	Santiago Bernabéu	81,044
Real Madrid	Madrid	Alfredo Di Stéfano	6,000
Real Sociedad	San Sebastián	Reale Arena	39,500
Sevilla	Seville	Ramón Sánchez Pizjuán	43,883
Valencia	Valencia	Mestalla	55,000
Valladolid	Valladolid	José Zorrilla	28,012
Villarreal	Villarreal	Estadio de la Cerámica	24,890

=== Personnel and sponsorship ===
Team	Manager	Captain	Kit manufacturer	Shirt sponsor(s)
Alavés	(Spain) Juan Muñiz	(Spain) Manu García	Kelme	Betway, Zotapay,^{1} Araba-Álava,^{2} Euskaltel,^{3} Integra Energía^{3}
Athletic Bilbao	(Spain) Gaizka Garitano	(Spain) Iker Muniain	New Balance	Kutxabank
Atlético Madrid	(Argentina) Diego Simeone	(Spain) Koke	Nike	Plus500, Ria Money Transfer,^{1} Hyundai^{2}
Barcelona	(Spain) Quique Setién	(Argentina) Lionel Messi	Nike	Rakuten, UNICEF,^{1} Beko^{2}
Celta Vigo	(Spain) Óscar García	(Spain) Hugo Mallo	Adidas	Estrella Galicia 0,0, Abanca,^{1} Grupo Recalvi^{3}
Eibar	(Spain) José Luis Mendilibar	(Spain) Iván Ramis	Joma	AVIA, BOJ^{1}
Espanyol	(Spain) Francisco Rufete (interim)	(Spain) Javi López	Kelme	LD Sports, InnJoo,^{1}^{3} Riviera Maya^{2}
Getafe	(Spain) José Bordalás	(Spain) Jorge Molina	Joma	Tecnocasa Group, Reale Seguros,^{2} El Brillante,^{3} Libertex^{3}
Granada	(Spain) Diego Martínez	(Spain) Víctor Díaz	Nike	Winamax, Caja Rural^{2}
Leganés	(Mexico) Javier Aguirre	(Spain) Unai Bustinza	Joma	Betway, Laboratorios Ynsadiet,^{1} Dione Ice Cream,^{2} KFC,^{3} Vitaldent^{3}
Levante	(Spain) Paco López	(Spain) José Luis Morales	Macron	Betway, Baleària,^{1} La Nucía^{1}
Mallorca	(Spain) Vicente Moreno	(Spain) Xisco Campos	Umbro	Betfred, Blau Hotels,^{1} Roc Hotels,^{1} OK Cars,^{2} Air Europa,^{3} Juaneda^{3}
Osasuna	(Spain) Jagoba Arrasate	(Spain) Oier Sanjurjo	Hummel	Kirolbet, Victorino Vicente,^{1} Selk,^{2} Acunsa^{3}
Real Betis	(Spain) Alexis Trujillo (interim)	(Spain) Joaquín	Kappa	easyMarkets, #welcometoSeville,^{1} Reale Seguros,^{2} BeSoccer^{3}
Real Madrid	(France) Zinedine Zidane	(Spain) Sergio Ramos	Adidas	Emirates
Real Sociedad	(Spain) Imanol Alguacil	(Spain) Asier Illarramendi	Macron	GoodBall.com, Kutxabank,^{1} Reale Seguros^{2}
Sevilla	(Spain) Julen Lopetegui	(Spain) Jesús Navas	Nike	Marathonbet, #welcometoSeville,^{1} Valvoline,^{2} EverFX^{3}
Valencia	(Spain) Voro (interim)	(Spain) Dani Parejo	Puma	bwin, Libertex,^{1} Sailun Tyres,^{2} Škoda^{3}
Valladolid	(Spain) Sergio González	(Spain) Javi Moyano	Adidas	Estrella Galicia 0,0, Cuatro Rayas,^{1} Integra Energía,^{2} Air Europa^{3}
Villarreal	(Spain) Javier Calleja	(Spain) Bruno	Joma	Pamesa Cerámica

1. On the back of shirt.
2. On the sleeves.
3. On the shorts.

=== Managerial changes ===
Team	Outgoing manager	Manner of departure	Date of vacancy	Position in table	Incoming manager	Date of appointment
Real Betis	(Spain) Quique Setién	Mutual consent	19 May 2019	Pre-season	(Spain) Rubi	6 June 2019
Alavés	(Spain) Abelardo	Resigned	20 May 2019	Pre-season	(Spain) Asier Garitano	21 May 2019
Sevilla	(Spain) Joaquín Caparrós	End of contract	23 May 2019	Pre-season	(Spain) Julen Lopetegui	4 June 2019
Espanyol	(Spain) Rubi	Signed for Real Betis	6 June 2019	Pre-season	(Spain) David Gallego	6 June 2019
Valencia	(Spain) Marcelino	Sacked	11 September 2019	10th	(Spain) Albert Celades	11 September 2019
Espanyol	(Spain) David Gallego	Sacked	7 October 2019	19th	(Spain) Pablo Machín	7 October 2019
Leganés	(Argentina) Mauricio Pellegrino	Resigned	21 October 2019	20th	(Mexico) Javier Aguirre	4 November 2019
Celta Vigo	(Spain) Fran Escribá	Sacked	3 November 2019	18th	(Spain) Óscar García	4 November 2019
Espanyol	(Spain) Pablo Machín	Sacked	23 December 2019	20th	(Spain) Abelardo	27 December 2019
Barcelona	(Spain) Ernesto Valverde	Sacked	13 January 2020	2nd	(Spain) Quique Setién	13 January 2020
Real Betis	(Spain) Rubi	Sacked	21 June 2020	14th	(Spain) Alexis Trujillo (interim)	21 June 2020
Espanyol	(Spain) Abelardo	Sacked	27 June 2020	20th	(Spain) Francisco Rufete (interim)	27 June 2020
Valencia	(Spain) Albert Celades	Sacked	29 June 2020	8th	(Spain) Voro (interim)	29 June 2020
Alavés	(Spain) Asier Garitano	Sacked	5 July 2020	15th	(Spain) Juan Muñiz	5 July 2020

== League table ==
=== Standings ===
Pos	Team	Pld	W	D	L	GF	GA	GD	Pts	Qualification or relegation
1	Real Madrid (C)	38	26	9	3	70	25	+45	87	Qualification for the Champions League group stage
2	Barcelona	38	25	7	6	86	38	+48	82	Qualification for the Champions League group stage
3	Atlético Madrid	38	18	16	4	51	27	+24	70	Qualification for the Champions League group stage
4	Sevilla	38	19	13	6	54	34	+20	70	Qualification for the Champions League group stage
5	Villarreal	38	18	6	14	63	49	+14	60	Qualification for the Europa League group stage
6	Real Sociedad	38	16	8	14	56	48	+8	56	Qualification for the Europa League group stage
7	Granada	38	16	8	14	52	45	+7	56	Qualification for the Europa League second qualifying round (Note: The 2020 Copa del Rey Final was postponed due to the COVID-19 pandemic in Spain and could not be completed by the UEFA registration deadline of 3 August 2020, so the fifth- and sixth-placed teams in the 2019–20 La Liga, Villarreal and Real Sociedad, entered the 2020–21 UEFA Europa League at the group stage, and the seventh-placed team, Granada, entered at the second qualifying round.)
8	Getafe	38	14	12	12	43	37	+6	54	
9	Valencia	38	14	11	13	46	53	−7	53	
10	Osasuna	38	13	13	12	46	54	−8	52	
11	Athletic Bilbao	38	13	12	13	41	38	+3	51	
12	Levante	38	14	7	17	47	53	−6	49	
13	Valladolid	38	9	15	14	32	43	−11	42	
14	Eibar	38	11	9	18	39	56	−17	42	
15	Real Betis	38	10	11	17	48	60	−12	41	
16	Alavés	38	10	9	19	34	59	−25	39	
17	Celta Vigo	38	7	16	15	37	49	−12	37	
18	Leganés (R)	38	8	12	18	30	51	−21	36	Relegation to Segunda División
19	Mallorca (R)	38	9	6	23	40	65	−25	33	Relegation to Segunda División
20	Espanyol (R)	38	5	10	23	27	58	−31	25	Relegation to Segunda División

Source: La Liga, Soccerway
Rules for classification: 1) Points; 2) Head-to-head points; 3) Head-to-head goal difference; 4) Goal difference; 5) Goals scored; 6) Fair-play points (Note: Head-to-head record is used only after all the matches between the teams in question have been played)
(C) Champions; (R) Relegated

=== Results ===
Home \ Away	ALA	ATH	ATM	BAR	CEL	EIB	ESP	GET	GRA	LEG	LEV	MLL	OSA	BET	RMA	RSO	SEV	VAL	VLL	VIL
Alavés	—	2–1	1–1	0–5	2–0	2–1	0–0	0–0	0–2	1–1	1–0	2–0	0–1	1–1	1–2	2–0	0–1	1–1	3–0	1–2
Athletic Bilbao	2–0	—	1–1	1–0	1–1	0–0	3–0	0–2	2–0	0–2	2–1	3–1	0–1	1–0	0–1	2–0	1–2	0–1	1–1	1–0
Atlético Madrid	2–1	2–0	—	0–1	0–0	3–2	3–1	1–0	1–0	0–0	2–1	3–0	2–0	1–0	0–0	1–1	2–2	1–1	1–0	3–1
Barcelona	4–1	1–0	2–2	—	4–1	5–0	1–0	2–1	1–0	2–0	2–1	5–2	1–2	5–2	0–0	1–0	4–0	5–2	5–1	2–1
Celta Vigo	6–0	1–0	1–1	2–2	—	0–0	1–1	0–1	0–2	1–0	2–3	2–2	1–1	1–1	1–3	0–1	2–1	1–0	0–0	0–1
Eibar	0–2	2–2	2–0	0–3	2–0	—	1–2	0–1	3–0	0–0	3–0	1–2	0–2	1–1	0–4	1–2	3–2	1–0	3–1	2–1
Espanyol	2–0	1–1	1–1	2–2	0–0	0–2	—	1–1	0–3	0–1	1–3	1–0	2–4	2–2	0–1	1–3	0–2	1–2	0–2	0–1
Getafe	1–1	1–1	0–2	0–2	0–0	1–1	0–0	—	3–1	2–0	4–0	4–2	0–0	1–0	0–3	2–1	0–3	3–0	2–0	1–3
Granada	3–0	4–0	1–1	2–0	0–0	1–2	2–1	2–1	—	1–0	1–2	1–0	1–0	1–0	1–2	1–2	0–1	2–2	2–1	0–1
Leganés	1–1	1–1	0–1	1–2	3–2	1–2	2–0	0–3	0–0	—	1–2	1–0	0–1	0–0	2–2	2–1	0–3	1–0	1–2	0–3
Levante	0–1	1–2	0–1	3–1	3–1	0–0	0–1	1–0	1–1	2–0	—	2–1	1–1	4–2	1–0	1–1	1–1	2–4	2–0	2–1
Mallorca	1–0	0–0	0–2	0–4	5–1	2–1	2–0	0–1	1–2	1–1	2–0	—	2–2	1–2	1–0	0–1	0–2	4–1	0–1	3–1
Osasuna	4–2	1–2	0–5	2–2	2–1	0–0	1–0	0–0	0–3	2–1	2–0	2–2	—	0–0	1–4	3–4	1–1	3–1	0–0	2–1
Real Betis	1–2	3–2	1–2	2–3	2–1	1–1	1–0	1–1	2–2	2–1	3–1	3–3	3–0	—	2–1	3–0	1–2	2–1	1–2	0–2
Real Madrid	2–0	0–0	1–0	2–0	2–2	3–1	2–0	1–0	4–2	5–0	3–2	2–0	2–0	0–0	—	3–1	2–1	3–0	1–1	2–1
Real Sociedad	3–0	2–1	2–0	2–2	0–1	4–1	2–1	1–2	2–3	1–1	1–2	3–0	1–1	3–1	1–2	—	0–0	3–0	1–0	1–2
Sevilla	1–1	1–1	1–1	0–0	1–1	1–0	2–2	2–0	2–0	1–0	1–0	2–0	3–2	2–0	0–1	3–2	—	1–0	1–1	1–2
Valencia	2–1	0–2	2–2	2–0	1–0	1–0	1–0	3–3	2–0	1–1	1–1	2–0	2–0	2–1	1–1	1–1	1–1	—	2–1	2–1
Valladolid	1–0	1–4	0–0	0–1	0–0	2–0	2–1	1–1	1–1	2–2	0–0	3–0	1–1	2–0	0–1	0–0	0–1	1–1	—	1–1
Villarreal	4–1	0–0	0–0	1–4	1–3	4–0	1–2	1–0	4–4	1–2	2–1	1–0	3–1	5–1	2–2	1–2	2–2	2–0	2–0	—

Source: La Liga, Soccerway
Legend: Blue = home team win; Yellow = draw; Red = away team win.

== Season statistics ==
=== Scoring ===
- First goal of the season:
  (Spain) Aritz Aduriz for Athletic Bilbao against Barcelona (16 August 2019)
- Last goal of the season:
  (Spain) Coke for Levante against Getafe (19 July 2020)

=== Top goalscorers ===
Rank	Player	Club	Goals
1	(Argentina) Lionel Messi	Barcelona	25
2	(France) Karim Benzema	Real Madrid	21
3	(Spain) Gerard Moreno	Villarreal	18
4	(Uruguay) Luis Suárez	Barcelona	16
5	(Spain) Raúl García	Athletic Bilbao	15
6	(Spain) Iago Aspas	Celta Vigo	14
6	(Argentina) Lucas Ocampos	Sevilla	14
8	(Croatia) Ante Budimir	Mallorca	13
9	(Spain) Álvaro Morata	Atlético Madrid	12
10	(Spain) Santi Cazorla	Villarreal	11
10	(Brazil) Willian José	Real Sociedad	11
10	(Spain) Joselu	Alavés	11
10	(Spain) Jaime Mata	Getafe	11
10	(Spain) Lucas Pérez	Alavés	11
10	(Spain) Sergio Ramos	Real Madrid	11
10	(Spain) Roger	Levante	11

=== Top assists ===
Rank	Player	Club	Assists
1	(Argentina) Lionel Messi	Barcelona	21
2	(Spain) Mikel Oyarzabal	Real Sociedad	11
3	(Spain) Santi Cazorla	Villarreal	9
4	(France) Karim Benzema	Real Madrid	8
4	(Spain) Portu	Real Sociedad	8
4	(Uruguay) Luis Suárez	Barcelona	8
4	(Spain) Roberto Torres	Osasuna	8
8	(Argentina) Éver Banega	Sevilla	7
8	(Spain) José Campaña	Levante	7
8	(Croatia) Luka Modrić	Real Madrid	7
8	(Spain) Jesús Navas	Sevilla	7
8	(Chile) Fabián Orellana	Eibar	7
8	(Spain) Rodrigo	Valencia	7

=== Zamora Trophy ===
The Ricardo Zamora Trophy was awarded by newspaper Marca to the goalkeeper with the lowest ratio of goals conceded to matches played. A goalkeeper had to play at least 28 matches of 60 or more minutes to be eligible for the trophy.

Rank	Player	Club	Goals against	Matches	Average
1	(Belgium) Thibaut Courtois	Real Madrid	20	34	0.59
2	(Slovenia) Jan Oblak	Atlético Madrid	27	38	0.71
3	(Spain) Unai Simón	Athletic Bilbao	29	33	0.88
4	(Spain) David Soria	Getafe	37	38	0.97
4	(Czech Republic) Tomáš Vaclík	Sevilla	31	32	0.97

=== Hat-tricks ===
Player	For	Against	Result	Date	Round
(Argentina) Lionel Messi	Barcelona	Celta Vigo	4–1 (H)	9 November 2019	13
(Argentina) Lionel Messi	Barcelona	Mallorca	5–2 (H)	7 December 2019	16
(Spain) Joaquín	Real Betis	Athletic Bilbao	3–2 (H)	8 December 2019	16
(Argentina) Lionel Messi^{4}	Barcelona	Eibar	5–0 (H)	22 February 2020	25

^{4} – Player scored four goals.

=== Discipline ===
==== Player ====
- Most yellow cards: 15
  - (Spain) Gerard Piqué (Barcelona)
  - (Uruguay) Damián Suárez (Getafe)
- Most red cards: 2
  - (Morocco) Zouhair Feddal (Real Betis)
  - (France) Nabil Fekir (Real Betis)
  - (South Korea) Lee Kang-in (Valencia)
  - (France) Clément Lenglet (Barcelona)
  - (Cameroon) Allan Nyom (Getafe)
  - (Argentina) Facundo Roncaglia (Osasuna)

==== Team ====
- Most yellow cards: 130
  - Getafe
- Most red cards: 9
  - Espanyol
  - Real Betis
- Fewest yellow cards: 71
  - Levante
- Fewest red cards: 0
  - Valladolid

== Match ball ==
On 15 April 2019, Puma announced their official partnership with La Liga to manufacture the official match ball for the Liga de Fútbol Profesional. This ended La Liga's 23-year partnership with Nike.

== Average attendances ==
Matches played under closed doors are not included in the table.

Pos	Team	Total	High	Low	Average	Change
1	Barcelona	1,014,604	93,426	58,198	72,472	−3.6%
2	Real Madrid	867,570	78,237	53,870	66,736	+10.1%
3	Atlético Madrid	801,127	67,942	45,944	57,223	+2.1%
4	Real Betis	671,130	54,426	42,578	47,938	+8.6%
5	Athletic Bilbao	533,364	47,693	33,364	41,028	+0.6%
6	Valencia	566,772	45,961	37,570	40,484	+2.3%
7	Sevilla	475,811	42,375	31,453	36,601	+1.4%
8	Real Sociedad	398,165	36,730	26,446	30,628	+37.6%
9	Espanyol	296,935	32,084	17,390	22,841	+19.8%
10	Valladolid	260,496	23,680	16,333	20,038	+6.3%
11	Levante	243,632	22,543	14,886	18,741	−4.7%
12	Celta Vigo	229,137	23,614	11,983	17,626	−0.4%
13	Villarreal	213,788	19,753	12,067	16,445	−1.3%
14	Granada	212,074	18,895	14,127	16,313	+41.0%^{1}
15	Osasuna	218,165	17,000	13,993	15,583	+5.0%^{1}
16	Mallorca	198,228	19,503	8,174	14,159	+58.6%^{1}
17	Alavés	188,205	17,089	10,053	13,443	−8.6%
18	Getafe	157,601	15,426	6,536	11,257	+3.9%
19	Leganés	139,569	11,742	6,404	9,969	−0.5%
20	Eibar	78,992	7,222	5,350	6,076	+24.6%
	League total	7,765,365	93,426	5,341	28,868	+7.6%

Updated to games played on 8 March 2020
Source: World Football
Notes:
1: Team played last season in Segunda División.

== Awards ==
=== Seasonal ===
Award	Recipient
Best Player	(France) Karim Benzema (Real Madrid)
Best Goalkeeper	(Belgium) Thibaut Courtois (Real Madrid)
Best Coach	(France) Zinedine Zidane (Real Madrid)

==== Team of the Year ====

Team of the Year
Goalkeeper	(Belgium) Thibaut Courtois (Real Madrid)			
Defenders	(Spain) Jesús Navas (Sevilla)	(Spain) Sergio Ramos (Real Madrid)	(Brazil) Diego Carlos (Sevilla)	(Spain) Yuri Berchiche (Athletic Bilbao)
Midfielders	(Brazil) Casemiro (Real Madrid)		(Germany) Toni Kroos (Real Madrid)	(Spain) Santi Cazorla (Villarreal)
Forwards	(Argentina) Lionel Messi (Barcelona)		(France) Karim Benzema (Real Madrid)	(Spain) Gerard Moreno (Villarreal)

==== EA Sports ====
Pos.	Player	Club	Ref.
GK	(Slovenia) Jan Oblak	Atlético Madrid	
DF	(France) Raphaël Varane	Real Madrid	
DF	(Spain) Sergio Ramos	Real Madrid	
DF	(Brazil) Marcelo	Real Madrid	
DF	(Spain) Dani Carvajal	Real Madrid	
MF	(Germany) Toni Kroos	Real Madrid	
MF	(Spain) Santi Cazorla	Villarreal	
MF	(France) Nabil Fekir	Real Betis	
FW	(Argentina) Lionel Messi	Barcelona	
FW	(Uruguay) Luis Suárez	Barcelona	
FW	(France) Karim Benzema	Real Madrid	

=== Monthly ===
Month	Player of the Month		Reference
Month	Player	Club	Reference
September	(Norway) Martin Ødegaard	Real Sociedad	
October	(Cameroon) Karl Toko Ekambi	Villarreal	
November	(Argentina) Lionel Messi	Barcelona	
December	(Uruguay) Luis Suárez	Barcelona	
January	(Belgium) Thibaut Courtois	Real Madrid	
February	(Argentina) Lionel Messi	Barcelona	
June	(France) Karim Benzema	Real Madrid	
