= Alina Dorofeeva =

Azerbaijani footballer (born 1998)

Alina Dorofeeva Алина Дорофеева
Personal information
- Full name: Alina Anatolyevna Dorofeeva
- Date of birth: 31 August 1998 (age 28)
- Place of birth: Krasnoyarsk, Russia
- Height: 1.70 m (5 ft 7 in)
- Position: Defender

Team information
- Current team: Yenisey
- Number: 23

Senior career*
Years	Team	Apps	(Gls)
2017–	Yenisey	39	(1)

International career^{‡}
2015	Russia U17	3	(0)
2019–	Azerbaijan	4	(1)
- * Club domestic league appearances and goals as of 23 November 2019 ‡ National team caps and goals as of 11 March 2020

Alina Anatolyevna Dorofeeva (Russian: Алина Анатольевна Дорофеева; born 31 August 1998) is a footballer who plays as a defender for Russian Women's Championship club Yenisey. Born in Russia, she plays for the Azerbaijan women's national team. She represented her country of birth at under-17 international level.

== International goals ==
No.	Date	Venue	Opponent	Score	Result	Competition
1.	10 November 2019	Zimbru Stadium, Chișinău, Moldova	Moldova	1–1	1–3	UEFA Women's Euro 2022 qualifying
2.	14 July 2023	Jānis Skredelis' stadium, Riga, Latvia	Latvia	1–0	1–1	Friendly

== See also ==
- List of Azerbaijan women's international footballers
