= Michael Oliva =

British composer (born 1966)

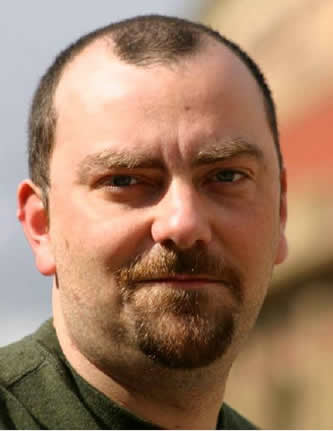
- Michael Oliva in 2009
- Born: 18 April 1966 (age 60); Edmonton, England
- Occupation: composer
- Writing career
- Subjects: electroacoustics, opera
- Website: www.michaeloliva.net

Michael Oliva (born 18 April 1966) is a British composer of contemporary classical music, working mainly in electroacoustics and opera.

== Early life ==
Oliva was born in Edmonton, north London to a German mother and an Italian father. From early childhood, his mother regularly took him to the English National Opera. He attended The Latymer School, a local mixed grammar school known for musical excellence. Although Oliva had already begun composing at the age of 15, he studied biochemistry (specialising in neurochemistry) at Lady Margaret Hall, Oxford. After obtaining his degree in 1988, he decided to concentrate on music.

== Musical career ==
After university, in addition to concert works, Oliva began composing music for theatre. During the 1990s, he worked closely with Erica Whyman at Southwark Playhouse, the Gate Theatre and English Touring Theatre. In 1995, he co-founded the Mother Digital Studio in Shoreditch, east London. He began working at the Royal College of Music in 1998, where he is now Area Leader for Electroacoustic Music teaching composition with electronics. Each term, Oliva curates and directs 'From the Soundhouse', public concerts of electroacoustic music (the title is taken from Francis Bacon's New Atlantis). These concerts present new works and rarely heard classics from the electroacoustic repertoire. In 2003, Oliva was a founding member of the contemporary music ensemble rarescale. He continues to work as electronics performer and composer in residence with the group. Between 2004 and 2011, Oliva was lecturer in Music Technology at Imperial College London. He is published by Tetractys.

== Musical style ==
Oliva’s music draws on a wide range of inspirations, from Scriabin, Stockhausen, Takemitsu, Brian Eno, Miles Davis to spectralism. He has particular interests in working with microtonal harmony and creating new repertoire for low woodwind, especially the alto flute and bass flute. Since 2003, he has worked closely with the low flute specialist Carla Rees. In opera, his work is notable for its lyrical vocal style. Oliva makes extensive use of video and electronic sound as an integral part of the storytelling, expanding the form though the use of film and television techniques.

== Major works ==
- More Bless'd than Living Lips (1995; chamber concerto for oboe)
- Ocean (1997; soprano, tenor, bass clarinet, oboe, electronics)
- Into the Light (1997; oboe/cor anglais, piano)
- The Speed of Metals (1999; chamber orchestra, electronics)
- Torso (2001; wind orchestra)
- Black and Blue (2004; opera)
- Apparition and Release (2005; quartertone alto flute, electronics)
- Moss Garden (2006; bass flute, electronics)
- The Girl Who Liked to be Thrown Around (2006; chamber opera)
- Nocturne (2008; quartertone alto flute, piano, electronics)
- Dover Beach (2010; soprano, alto flute, bass clarinet, electronics)
- Requiem (2010; SATB choir, alto flute, organ, electronics)
- Les Heures Bleues (2013; solo Kingma system alto flute)

== Discography ==
- New Ground (2002) Oboe Classics CC2003
- Apparition and Release – rarescale plays Michael Oliva (2008) rarescale records rr001
- Nocturne – rarescale plays Michael Oliva (2012) rarescale records rr005
