= Abelard (disambiguation) =

Peter Abelard (1079–1142) was a French philosopher and logician.

Abelard may also refer to:

- Abelard of Hauteville (c. 1044–1081), Italo-Norman noble
- Humphrey of Hauteville (died 1057), Norman Count of Apulia nicknamed "Abelard"
- Abelard Giza (born 1980), Polish comedian, writer, filmmaker, and actor
- Gesner Abelard (born 1922), Haitian painter
- Abelard Snazz, a fictional character in the comic 2000AD
- Abelard Voss, a fictional criminologist and detective in three Donald Clough Cameron novels
- The Abelard School, Toronto-based private school, named after Peter Abélard
- HMS Abelard, a cancelled Amphion class submarine

== See also ==
- Abelardo
