= Abelardo Albisi =

Italian flautist and composer

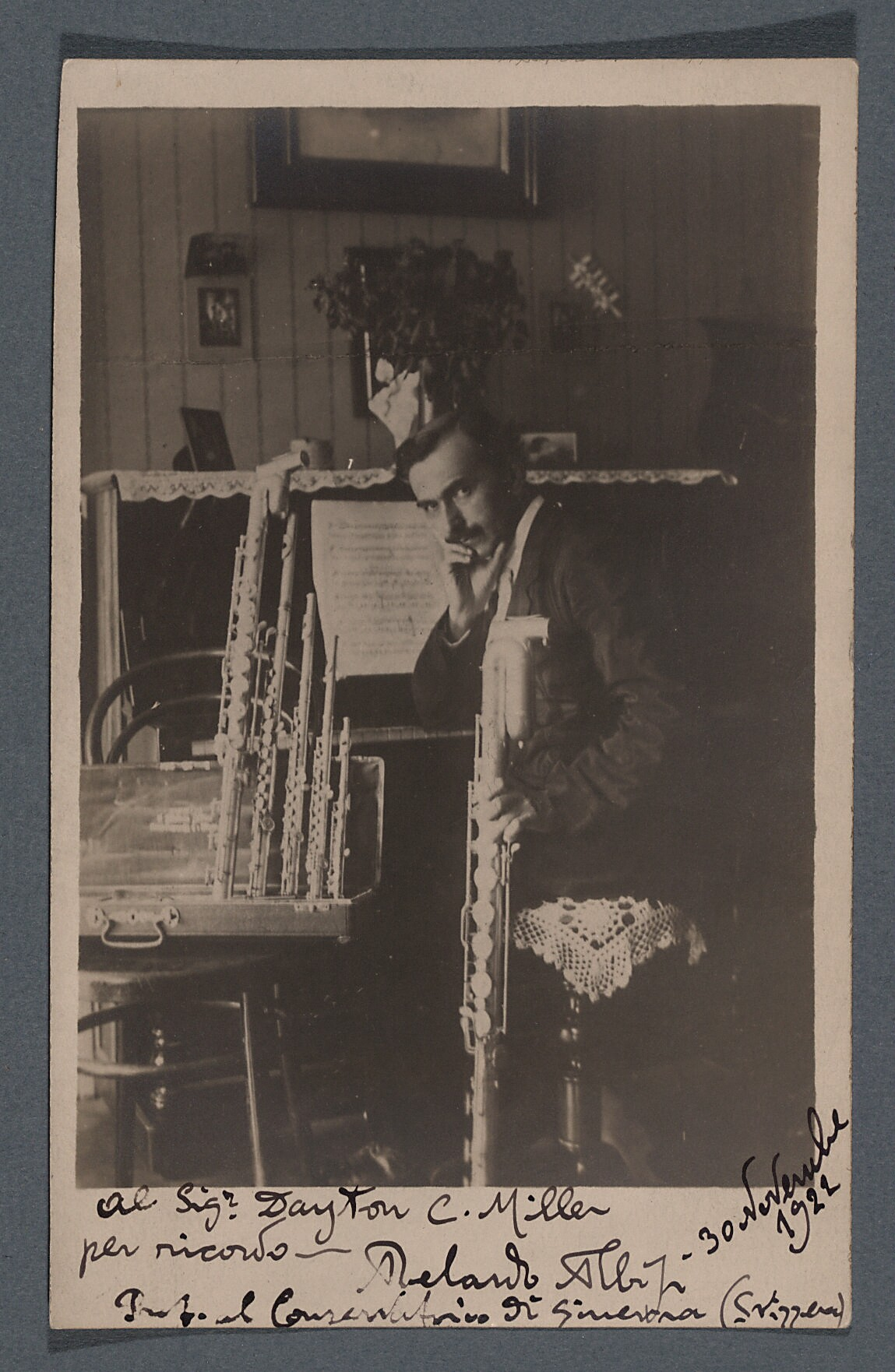
1922 photograph of Abelardo Albisi

Abelardo Albisi (1872–1938) was an Italian flutist and instrument maker and composer. He was first flutist of the orchestra at La Scala for many years. In 1910 he invented the albisiphone, a type of bass flute. The instrument achieved some popularity in Italy and was notably included in the scores of several operas by Riccardo Zandonai and Pietro Mascagni, and in symphonic music by Friedrich Klose among other composers.
