= Abelardo Vicioso =

Dominican intellectual and politician (1930–2004)

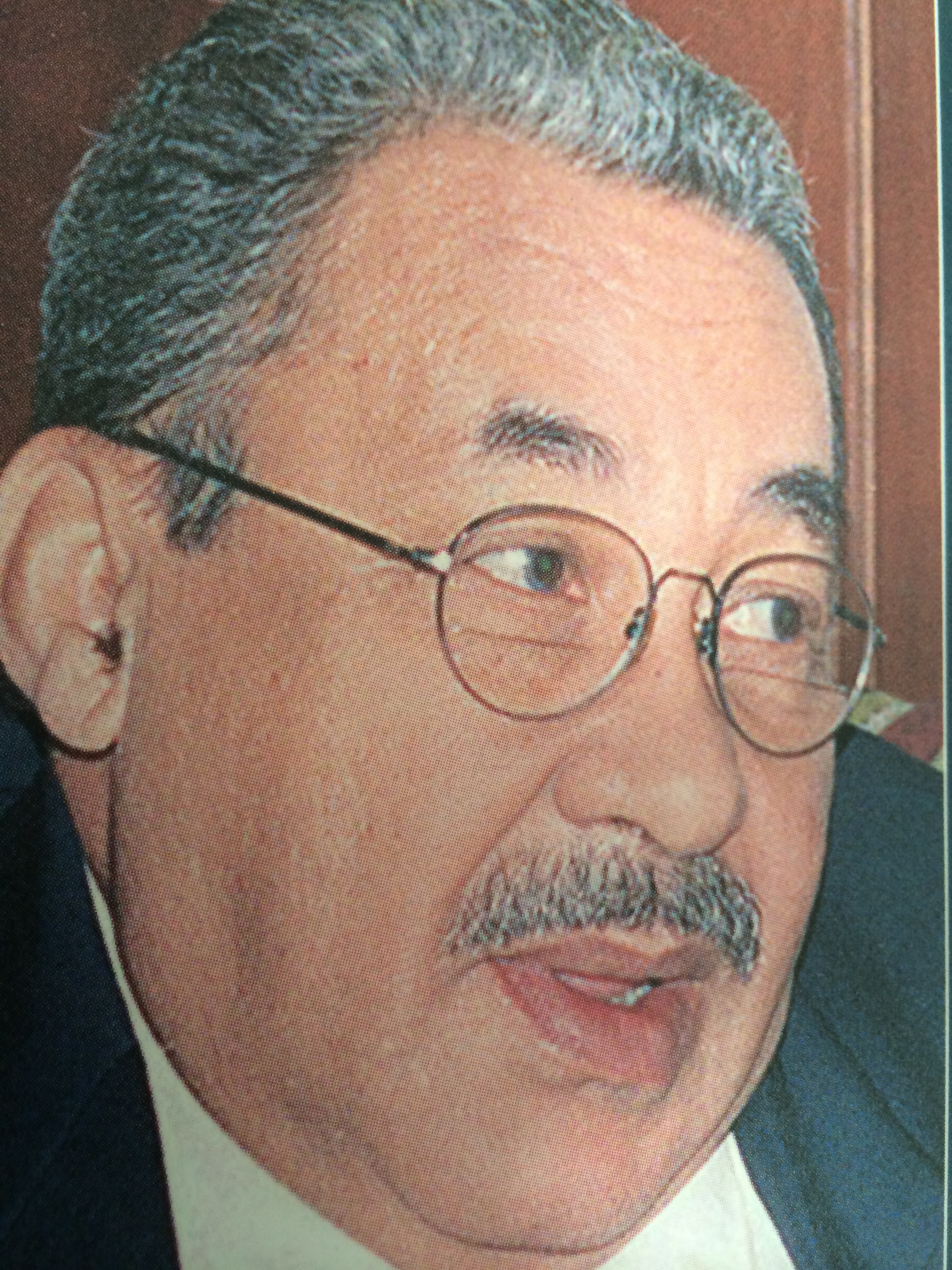
- Born: 27 April 1930; Santo Domingo, Dominican Republic
- Died: 13 January 2004 (aged 73); Santo Domingo
- Occupations: Politician, lawyer, poet

Abelardo Vicioso (April 27, 1930 – January 13, 2004) was a Dominican intellectual, politician, lawyer, and poet.

== Early years and education ==
Abelardo Sergio Vicioso González was born in 1930 in Santo Domingo. His parents were Sergio Vicioso and Leonor González, and he was the oldest one of five sons.

His talent for literature came through his early years as a child and his first poems were published in 1948, at the age of 18, in the newspaper "El Caribe". Vicioso studied law in the University of Sant Domingo and graduated in 1953.

== Life and career ==
After applying for a diplomatic position in the Government -as requested in a Dominican newspaper-, unexpectedly Trujillo in person named Abelardo in the Army, with the rank of Second Lieutenant. Afterwards he became First Lieutenant, acting as Academy Military Instructor, and also directing the Army official magazine. Finally Vicioso was named as Military Prosecutor. However, and given the unbreathable existing political situation, he joined the groups who conspired against the tyrant. As advised, and in order to save his life, his father Sergio, with important connections in the Ministry of Foreign Affairs, could take him out of the country designated as Vice-Council in Curaçao. Trujillo got terribly mad when he knew the decision, so instead decided to send his brother Vinicio, experienced piloto graduated from the prestigious Lackland US Air Force Base Academy in Texas- to Curaçao to bring back his brother Abelardo. Both being in danger, finally decided to stay in the former Dutch colony, then transferring to Cuba, as political refugees. But there they were kept in prison by Fidel Castro government accused of being Trujillo's spies, version Trujillo officially spread. One year later they were both released. Simultaneously, his family in Santo Domingo was retained in the military base of San Isidro as lure hostages, being tortured psychologically for several months. Previously, there was an attempt of poisoning his father Sergio, hospitalized in Padre Billini Hospital, action discovered and aborted by nurse nuns.

In 1963 he returned to his native land, the Dominican Republic, after Trujillo had been executed (1961), when Juan Bosch -first democratic President elected democratically after dictatorship-, came to power (although overthrown seven months later by conservative forces). Just a few months before, his tormented brother Vinicio committed suicide.

In 1965, during April Revolution held to reconstitute the government of Juan Bosch, his poem "Canto a Santo Domingo Vertical" became a hymn of combatants. The whole family supported the conflict by conforming the comando named Los Lobos located in Arzobispo Meriño street almost corner Mercedes street, where even kids and women healed and prepared food for the rebels and also placed mirrors in the rooftop of the building to dazzle attacking opponent plane pilots in order to avoid their lethal falling bombs.

After concluding the Civil War and US Intervention, Vicioso became professor of the Autonomous University of Santo Domingo (UASD) -Autonomous since 1961 and where he graduated of law in 1953-, being elected first as Director of Literature Department of the Faculty of Humanities, later as Vice-Dean of said Faculty, and finally Dean for two consecutive periods.

== Political activity ==
During his stay in Cuba, Vicioso co-founded the People's Socialist Party. Years later (1982), this political organization joined the Dominican Liberation Party(PLD), and Abelardo immediately integrated into its Central Committee. He was also personal assistant to Professor Juan Bosch, the President of the Party. In 1992 he left PLD and founded the Alliance for Democracy, of which Abelardo was vice-president. Afterwrads, the Alliance for Democracy supported PLD and during the first presidential term of Leonel Fernández Reina (1996-2000) Vicioso was his Special Assistant.

== Personal life ==
In 1964 Abelardo married Altagracia Solano, daughter of a wealthy landowner Santiago de los Caballeros, with whom procreated two children: Cynthia and Carlos. Vicioso was born with a hereditary disease named ankylosing spondyloarthritis (a rheumatic disease with pain and joint stiffening). During his last years of Life he began to writeg his first (and only) autobiographical novel with the title of "Memorias del Teniente Veneno" (Memoirs of Lieutenant Poison). However, and almost before concluding it, Vicioso died at the age of 74 due to cardiorespiratory problems on January 13, 2004, in his home in Santo Domingo. It was his son Carlos who published it in 2008 via Ministry of Culture and Editora Nacional during the National and International Santo Domingo Book Fair of that year. .

== Distinctions ==
- The University Council of the Universidad Autónoma de Santo Domingo gave him a plaque of recognition as a prominent member of the Generation of 48(Many critics refer to this group as generation of 60s)
- Also The University of Havana gave him the title of "Doctor Honoris Causa" in Literature
- He received the Medal of Friendship of the Cuban Council for his work as President of Dominican Friends of Cuba Committee
- His work "La Lumbre Sacudida" won the Gastón F. Deligne National Poetry Prize in 1958
- Santo Domingo en las Letras Coloniales (Santo Domingo in the Colonial Literature), 1492-1800 won the Jose Gabriel García National History Prize (1979 )
- El Freno Hatero en la Literatura Dominicana received Honorable Mention of Pedro Henríquez Ureña National Essay Award (1982)
- In life, he was declared a National Living Heritage.
- He was awarded by the Dominican Government with the Order of Duarte, Sánchez and Mella, in the degree of Commander.
- He was also President of Honor until his death of the Alliance for Democracy

== Books ==
- Abelardo Vicioso, Santo Domingo en las letras coloniales (1492-1800) (Not in English)(Spanish), Publisher: Univenidad Autónoma de Santo Domingo,

1978

- Abelardo Vicioso, El freno hatero en la Literatura Dominicana, Publisher: Santo Domingo, República Dominicana 1983

== Other works ==
- La Lumbre Sacudida (1957)
- Cantos Latinoamericanos (1960)
- Cien Poemas de Intenso Vivir (1990)
- Obras Completas de Gasto Deligne, Vols. XXIV y XXV (1996)
- De Amores y Sinsabores (1997)
- Las Memorias del Teniente Veneno (2004)
