= Jana Sedláčková =

Czech footballer

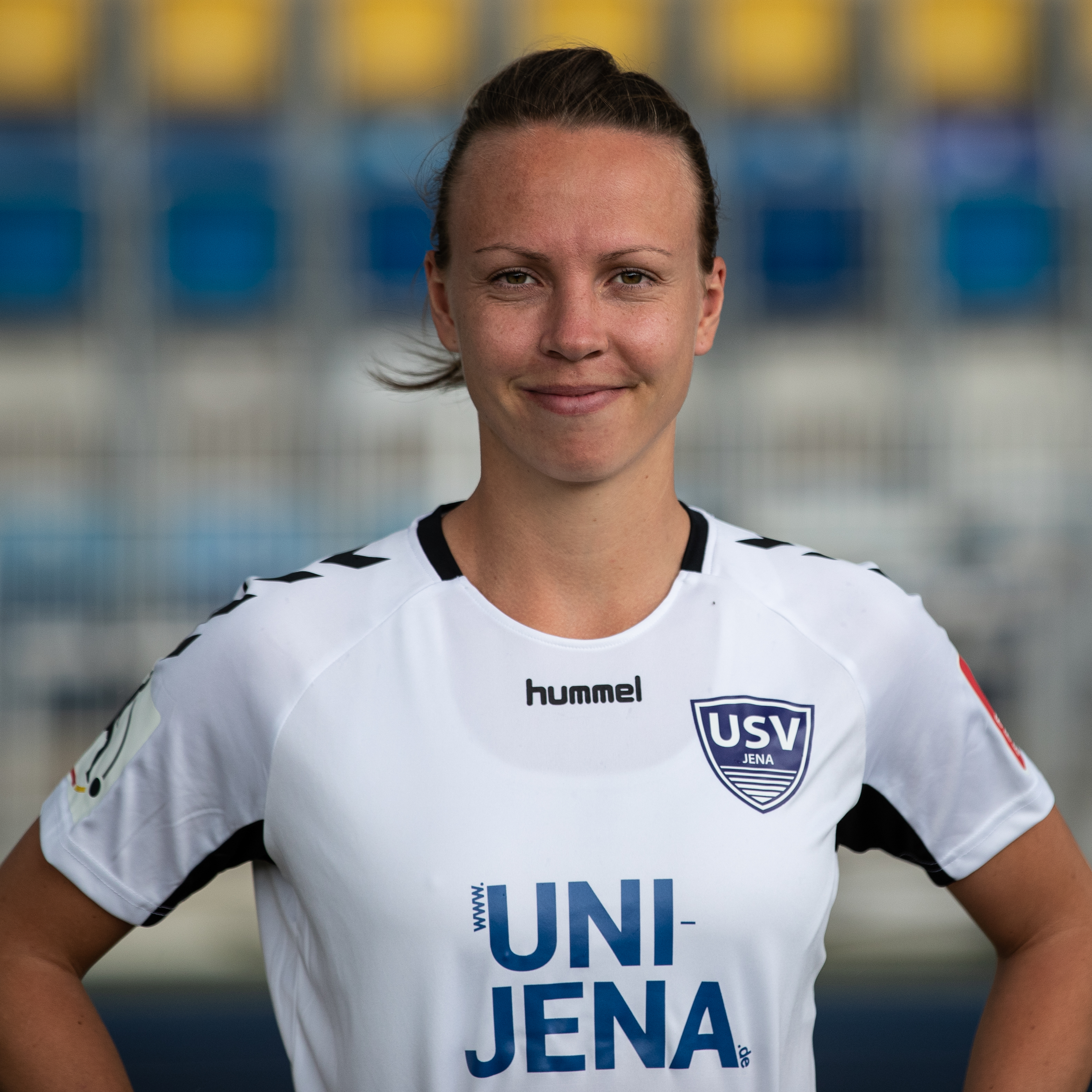
- Jana Sedláčková 2019

Personal information
- Full name: Jana Petříková
- Birth name: Jana Sedláčková
- Date of birth: 21 January 1993 (age 33)
- Place of birth: Benešov, Czech Republic
- Height: 1.69 m (5 ft 7 in)
- Position: Defender

Youth career
- Sedlec-Prčice
- 2005–2009: Sparta Praha

Senior career*
Years	Team	Apps	(Gls)
2009–2013	Sparta Praha		
2013–2015	1. FC Lübars	43	(3)
2015–2021	Carl Zeiss Jena (Note: Known until the 2019-20 season as FF USV Jena.)	64	(1)

International career^{‡}
2009–2021	Czech Republic	62	(5)
- * Club domestic league appearances and goals as of 20:15, 21 July 2019 (UTC) ‡ National team caps and goals as of 5 July 2021

Jana Petříková, born Sedláčková (born 21 January 1993) is a former Czech footballer who played as a defender for German Frauen-Bundesliga club FC Carl Zeiss Jena and the Czech Republic women's national team. For most of her career She played for Sparta Prague in the Czech Women's First League and the Champions League.

She was a member of the Czech national team since 2009. She made her debut for the national team on 26 November 2009 in a match against Belgium.

Sedláčková was voted talent of the year at the 2009 Czech Footballer of the Year (women).
