= Anastasia Sivolobova =

Moldovan footballer

Personal information
- Date of birth: 14 August 1998 (age 28)
- Position: Defender

Team information
- Current team: Zvezda Perm
- Number: 8

Senior career*
Years	Team	Apps	(Gls)
2020–2024	A-dos-Francos	6	(0)
2025–	Zvezda Perm	7	(0)

International career^{‡}
2015–2016	Moldova U19	5	(0)
2017–	Moldova	49	(1)
- * Club domestic league appearances and goals as of 1 June 2025 ‡ National team caps and goals as of 30 July 2025

Anastasia Sivolobova (born 14 August 1998) is a Moldovan footballer who plays as a defender for Russian Women's Football Championship club Zvezda Perm and the Moldova women's national team.

== Career ==
Sivolobova has been capped for the Moldova national team, appearing for the team during the 2019 FIFA Women's World Cup qualifying cycle.

== International goals ==
No.	Date	Venue	Opponent	Score	Result	Competition
1.	11 August 2024	Sportpark Kirchberg/Wagram, Kirchberg am Wagram, Austria	Saudi Arabia	1–0	1–0	Friendly

== See also ==
- List of Moldova women's international footballers
