= Dumitrița Prisăcari =

Moldovan footballer (born 1994)

Personal information
- Date of birth: 17 January 1994 (age 32)
- Position: Centre-back

International career^{‡}
Years	Team	Apps	(Gls)
- Moldova
- ‡ National team caps and goals as of 19:44, 30 August 2019 (UTC)

Dumitrița Prisăcari (born 17 January 1994) is a Moldovan footballer who plays as a centre-back and has appeared for the Moldova women's national team.

== Career ==
Prisăcari has been capped for the Moldova national team, appearing for the team during the 2019 FIFA Women's World Cup qualifying cycle.

== See also ==
- List of Moldova women's international footballers
