= 2019–20 UEFA Youth League group stage =

Football tournament group stage

The 2019–20 UEFA Youth League UEFA Champions League Path (group stage) began on 17 September and concluded on 11 December 2019. A total of 32 teams competed in the group stage of the UEFA Champions League Path to decide 16 of the 24 places in the knockout phase (play-offs and the round of 16 onwards) of the 2019–20 UEFA Youth League.

== Draw ==
The youth teams of the 32 clubs which qualified for the 2019–20 UEFA Champions League group stage entered the UEFA Champions League Path. If there was a vacancy (youth teams not entering), it was filled by a team defined by UEFA.

For the UEFA Champions League Path, the 32 teams were drawn into eight groups of four. There was no separate draw held, with the group compositions identical to the draw for the 2019–20 UEFA Champions League group stage, which was held on 29 August 2019, 18:00 CEST, at the Grimaldi Forum in Monaco.

Key to colours
Group winners advanced to round of 16
Group runners-up advanced to play-offs

Pot 1 Team (England) Liverpool (England) Chelsea (Spain) Barcelona (England) Manchester City (Italy) Juventus (Germany) Bayern Munich (France) Paris Saint-Germain (Russia) Zenit Saint Petersburg	Pot 2 Team (Spain) Real Madrid (Spain) Atlético Madrid (Germany) Borussia Dortmund (Italy) Napoli (Ukraine) Shakhtar Donetsk (England) Tottenham Hotspur (Netherlands) Ajax (Portugal) Benfica	Pot 3 Team (France) Lyon (Germany) Bayer Leverkusen (Austria) Red Bull Salzburg (Greece) Olympiacos (Belgium) Club Brugge (Spain) Valencia (Italy) Inter Milan (Croatia) Dinamo Zagreb	Pot 4 Team (Russia) Lokomotiv Moscow (Belgium) Genk (Turkey) Galatasaray (Germany) RB Leipzig (Czech Republic) Slavia Prague (Serbia) Red Star Belgrade (Italy) Atalanta (France) Lille

== Format ==
In each group, teams played against each other home-and-away in a round-robin format. The group winners advanced to the round of 16, while the eight runners-up advanced to the play-offs, where they were joined by the eight second round winners from the Domestic Champions Path.

=== Tiebreakers ===
Teams were ranked according to points (3 points for a win, 1 point for a draw, 0 points for a loss), and if tied on points, the following tiebreaking criteria were applied, in the order given, to determine the rankings (Regulations Articles 14.03):

1. Points in head-to-head matches among tied teams;
2. Goal difference in head-to-head matches among tied teams;
3. Goals scored in head-to-head matches among tied teams;
4. Away goals scored in head-to-head matches among tied teams;
5. If more than two teams were tied, and after applying all head-to-head criteria above, a subset of teams were still tied, all head-to-head criteria above were reapplied exclusively to this subset of teams;
6. Goal difference in all group matches;
7. Goals scored in all group matches;
8. Away goals scored in all group matches;
9. Wins in all group matches;
10. Away wins in all group matches;
11. Disciplinary points (red card = 3 points, yellow card = 1 point, expulsion for two yellow cards in one match = 3 points);
12. Drawing of lots.

== Groups ==
The matchdays are 17–18 September, 1–2 October, 22–23 October, 5–6 November, 26–27 November, and 10–11 December 2019.

Times are CET/CEST, (Note: CEST (UTC+2) for dates up to 26 October 2019 (matchdays 1–3), and CET (UTC+1) for dates thereafter (matchdays 4–6).) as listed by UEFA (local times, if different, are in parentheses).

=== Group A ===
Pos	Team	Pld	W	D	L	GF	GA	GD	Pts	Qualification	RMA	BRU	PAR	GAL
1	(Spain) Real Madrid	6	4	1	1	16	10	+6	13	Round of 16	—	3–0	6–3	2–4
2	(Belgium) Club Brugge	6	3	1	2	12	9	+3	10	Play-offs	2–2	—	2–0	3–2
3	(France) Paris Saint-Germain	6	2	0	4	10	15	−5	6 (Note: Ranked on head-to-head points: Paris Saint-Germain 6, Galatasaray 0.)		1–2	0–4	—	1–0
4	(Turkey) Galatasaray	6	2	0	4	9	13	−4	6		0–1	2–1	1–5	—

Source: UEFA
Rules for classification: Tiebreakers
Notes:
18 September 2019
15:00

Club Brugge (Belgium)	3–2	(Turkey) Galatasaray
De Wolf 6' (pen.); De Ketelaere 10'; Aelterman 17'	Report	Baltacı 20' (pen.); Akgün 46'

Versluys Arena, Ostend
Attendance: 385
Referee: Sebastian Gishamer (Austria)
18 September 2019
16:00

Paris Saint-Germain (France)	1–2	(Spain) Real Madrid
Simons 43'	Report	Jordi 49'; Dotor 50'

Stade Municipal Georges Lefèvre, Saint-Germain-en-Laye
Attendance: 890
Referee: Stephan Klossner (Switzerland)

1 October 2019
14:00

Real Madrid (Spain)	3–0	(Belgium) Club Brugge
Latasa 14', 30'; Álvaro 88'	Report

Estadio Alfredo Di Stéfano, Madrid
Attendance: 370
Referee: Igor Pajac (Croatia)
1 October 2019
14:00 (15:00 UTC+3)

Galatasaray (Turkey)	1–5	(France) Paris Saint-Germain
Baltacı 49' (pen.)	Report	Kalimuendo 28'; Mbe Soh 32'; Aouchiche 46'; Kapo 51'; Pembélé 73'

Necmi Kadıoğlu Stadium, Istanbul
Attendance: 450
Referee: Ivaylo Stoyanov (Bulgaria)

22 October 2019
14:00 (15:00 UTC+3)

Galatasaray (Turkey)	0–1	(Spain) Real Madrid
	Report	Ramón 89'

Necmi Kadıoğlu Stadium, Istanbul
Attendance: 500
Referee: Horatiu Fesnic (Romania)
22 October 2019
16:00

Club Brugge (Belgium)	2–0	(France) Paris Saint-Germain
Aelterman 25'; Ochieng 67'	Report

Versluys Arena, Ostend
Attendance: 450
Referee: Krzysztof Jakubik (Poland)

6 November 2019
15:00

Paris Saint-Germain (France)	0–4	(Belgium) Club Brugge
	Report	Aelterman 12', 54'; De Cuyper 62'; Ochieng 85'

Stade Municipal Georges Lefèvre, Saint-Germain-en-Laye
Attendance: 420
Referee: Antti Munukka (Finland)
6 November 2019
16:00

Real Madrid (Spain)	2–4	(Turkey) Galatasaray
Armenteros 2'; Gutiérrez 65'	Report	Luş 24' (pen.); Akgün 55' (pen.); Yıldırım 86'; Arslan 90'

Estadio Alfredo Di Stéfano, Madrid
Attendance: 290
Referee: Stephan Klossner (Switzerland)

26 November 2019
13:00 (15:00 UTC+3)

Galatasaray (Turkey)	2–1	(Belgium) Club Brugge
Yıldırım 38'; Fettahoglu 75'	Report	De Wolf 53'

Necmi Kadıoğlu Stadium, Istanbul
Attendance: 253
Referee: Mykola Balakin (Ukraine)
26 November 2019
16:00

Real Madrid (Spain)	6–3	(France) Paris Saint-Germain
Baeza 6' (pen.); Dotor 62'; Ruiz 65', 68'; Arribas 73'; Rodríguez 90+1'	Report	Kalimuendo 41' (pen.), 49', 52'

Estadio Alfredo Di Stéfano, Madrid
Attendance: 630
Referee: António Nobre (Portugal)

11 December 2019
14:00

Club Brugge (Belgium)	2–2	(Spain) Real Madrid
De Wolf 27' (pen.); Lammens 90+5'	Report	Jordi 23'; Rodríguez 77'

Versluys Arena, Ostend
Attendance: 900
Referee: Mohammed Al-Hakim (Sweden)
11 December 2019
15:00

Paris Saint-Germain (France)	1–0	(Turkey) Galatasaray
Makutungu 8'	Report

Stade Municipal Georges Lefèvre, Saint-Germain-en-Laye
Attendance: 360
Referee: Helgi Mikael Jónasson (Iceland)

=== Group B ===
Pos	Team	Pld	W	D	L	GF	GA	GD	Pts	Qualification	BAY	RSB	TOT	OLY
1	(Germany) Bayern Munich	6	4	2	0	18	2	+16	14	Round of 16	—	0–0	3–0	6–0
2	(Serbia) Red Star Belgrade	6	3	2	1	8	11	−3	11	Play-offs	1–1	—	2–0	2–1
3	(England) Tottenham Hotspur	6	2	1	3	12	12	0	7		1–4	9–2	—	1–0
4	(Greece) Olympiacos	6	0	1	5	2	15	−13	1		0–4	0–1	1–1	—

Source: UEFA
Rules for classification: Tiebreakers
18 September 2019
14:00 (15:00 UTC+3)

Olympiacos (Greece)	1–1	(England) Tottenham Hotspur
Fekkas 32'	Report	Parrott 10'

Olympiacos FC Training Centre, Piraeus
Attendance: 200
Referee: Tihomir Pejin (Croatia)
18 September 2019
16:00

Bayern Munich (Germany)	0–0	(Serbia) Red Star Belgrade
	Report

FC Bayern Campus, Munich
Attendance: 374
Referee: Vitaliy Romanov (Ukraine)

1 October 2019
16:00 (15:00 UTC+1)

Tottenham Hotspur (England)	1–4	(Germany) Bayern Munich
Richards 27'	Report	Zirkzee 4'; Günther 11', 72'; Mosandl 62'

Tottenham Hotspur Training Centre, London
Attendance: 243
Referee: Kevin Clancy (Scotland)
1 October 2019
16:00

Red Star Belgrade (Serbia)	2–1	(Greece) Olympiacos
Mitrović 46'; Pantović 83'	Report	Liatsos 28'

Voždovac Stadium, Belgrade
Attendance: 731
Referee: Ondrej Pechanec (Czech Republic)

22 October 2019
16:00 (15:00 UTC+1)

Tottenham Hotspur (England)	9–2	(Serbia) Red Star Belgrade
Bennett 3'; Parrott 30', 32', 75' (pen.), 86'; Robson 49'; Etete 82'; White 90+1'; Maghoma 90+3'	Report	Burmaz 43'; Fagan-Walcott 50' (o.g.)

Tottenham Hotspur Training Centre, London
Attendance: 263
Referee: Iwan Arwel Griffith (Wales)
22 October 2019
16:00 (17:00 UTC+3)

Olympiacos (Greece)	0–4	(Germany) Bayern Munich
	Report	Zirkzee 35', 51', 74'; Günther 46'

Olympiacos FC Training Centre, Piraeus
Attendance: 1,200
Referee: Marius Avram (Romania)

6 November 2019
14:00

Bayern Munich (Germany)	6–0	(Greece) Olympiacos
Tillman 43', 81'; Batista Meier 48' (pen.), 72' (pen.); Johansson 77', 78'	Report

FC Bayern Campus, Munich
Attendance: 475
Referee: Peter Kralović (Slovakia)
6 November 2019
16:00

Red Star Belgrade (Serbia)	2–0	(England) Tottenham Hotspur
Radulović 69'; Piplića 90+3'	Report

Voždovac Stadium, Belgrade
Attendance: 650
Referee: Sebastian Gishamer (Austria)

26 November 2019
15:00 (14:00 UTC+0)

Tottenham Hotspur (England)	1–0	(Greece) Olympiacos
Parrott 57'	Report

Tottenham Hotspur Training Centre, London
Attendance: 253
Referee: Peter Kjaesgaard (Denmark)
26 November 2019
16:00

Red Star Belgrade (Serbia)	1–1	(Germany) Bayern Munich
Lukić 36'	Report	Batista Meier 54'

Voždovac Stadium, Belgrade
Attendance: 959
Referee: Ivaylo Stoyanov (Bulgaria)

11 December 2019
16:00 (17:00 UTC+2)

Olympiacos (Greece)	0–1	(Serbia) Red Star Belgrade
	Report	Radulović 41'

Olympiacos FC Training Centre, Piraeus
Attendance: 30
Referee: Krzysztof Jakubik (Poland)
11 December 2019
16:00

Bayern Munich (Germany)	3–0	(England) Tottenham Hotspur
Daniliuc 20'; Arrey-Mbi 50'; Stiller 74'	Report

FC Bayern Campus, Munich
Attendance: 500
Referee: Lawrence Visser (Belgium)

=== Group C ===
Pos	Team	Pld	W	D	L	GF	GA	GD	Pts	Qualification	ATA	DZG	MCI	SHK
1	(Italy) Atalanta	6	4	1	1	10	5	+5	13	Round of 16	—	2–0	1–0	2–2
2	(Croatia) Dinamo Zagreb	6	3	2	1	6	5	+1	11	Play-offs	1–0	—	1–0	1–0
3	(England) Manchester City	6	2	1	3	11	8	+3	7		1–3	2–2	—	5–0
4	(Ukraine) Shakhtar Donetsk	6	0	2	4	5	14	−9	2		1–2	1–1	1–3	—

Source: UEFA
Rules for classification: Tiebreakers
18 September 2019
12:00 (13:00 UTC+3)

Shakhtar Donetsk (Ukraine)	1–3	(England) Manchester City
Bondarenko 33'	Report	Bernabé 18'; Kozik 27' (o.g.); Touaizi 79'

FC Metalist Training Ground, Vysokyi
Attendance: 345
Referee: Manfredas Lukjančukas (Lithuania)
18 September 2019
15:00

Dinamo Zagreb (Croatia)	1–0	(Italy) Atalanta
Karrica 49'	Report

Stadion Hitrec-Kacian, Zagreb
Attendance: 567
Referee: Aristotélis Diamandópoulos (Greece)

1 October 2019
13:00

Atalanta (Italy)	2–2	(Ukraine) Shakhtar Donetsk
Piccoli 45', 71'	Report	Sudakov 26'; Abdullayev 90+4'

Centro Sportivo Bortolotti, Bergamo
Attendance: 0
Referee: Alexandru Tean (Moldova)
1 October 2019
16:00 (15:00 UTC+1)

Manchester City (England)	2–2	(Croatia) Dinamo Zagreb
Doyle 18'; Bernabé 45+1'	Report	Šipoš 27', 80'

Academy Stadium, Manchester
Attendance: 409
Referee: Urs Schnyder (Switzerland)

22 October 2019
12:00 (13:00 UTC+3)

Shakhtar Donetsk (Ukraine)	1–1	(Croatia) Dinamo Zagreb
Bondarenko 50' (pen.)	Report	Janković 55'

FC Metalist Training Ground, Vysokyi
Attendance: 405
Referee: Giorgi Kruashvili (Georgia)
22 October 2019
16:00 (15:00 UTC+1)

Manchester City (England)	1–3	(Italy) Atalanta
Poveda 12'	Report	Ghislandi 24'; Piccoli 49'; Amad 78'

Academy Stadium, Manchester
Attendance: 502
Referee: Miroslav Zelinka (Czech Republic)

6 November 2019
14:00

Atalanta (Italy)	1–0	(England) Manchester City
Piccoli 36' (pen.)	Report

Centro Sportivo Bortolotti, Bergamo
Attendance: 416
Referee: Timotheos Christofi (Cyprus)
6 November 2019
14:00

Dinamo Zagreb (Croatia)	1–0	(Ukraine) Shakhtar Donetsk
Krizmanić 61'	Report

Stadion Hitrec-Kacian, Zagreb
Attendance: 573
Referee: Ümit Öztürk (Turkey)

26 November 2019
13:00

Atalanta (Italy)	2–0	(Croatia) Dinamo Zagreb
Cortinovis 58'; Gyabuaa 61'	Report

Centro Sportivo Bortolotti, Bergamo
Attendance: 483
Referee: Juri Frischer (Estonia)
26 November 2019
16:00 (15:00 UTC+0)

Manchester City (England)	5–0	(Ukraine) Shakhtar Donetsk
Rogers 11'; Dele-Bashiru 23'; Poveda 26'; Touaizi 89'; Bernabé 90+1'	Report

Academy Stadium, Manchester
Attendance: 535
Referee: Bram Van Driessche (Belgium)

11 December 2019
11:00 (12:00 UTC+2)

Shakhtar Donetsk (Ukraine)	1–2	(Italy) Atalanta
Bondarenko 62' (pen.)	Report	Piccoli 20', 53'

FC Metalist Training Ground, Vysokyi
Attendance: 264
Referee: Rade Obrenovic (Slovenia)
11 December 2019
13:00

Dinamo Zagreb (Croatia)	1–0	(England) Manchester City
Marin 20'	Report

Stadion Hitrec-Kacian, Zagreb
Attendance: 450
Referee: Georgios Kominis (Greece)

=== Group D ===
Pos	Team	Pld	W	D	L	GF	GA	GD	Pts	Qualification	JUV	ATM	LEV	LMO
1	(Italy) Juventus	6	5	0	1	17	4	+13	15	Round of 16	—	2–1	4–1	1–2
2	(Spain) Atlético Madrid	6	4	0	2	11	8	+3	12	Play-offs	0–4	—	2–0	3–0
3	(Germany) Bayer Leverkusen	6	1	1	4	6	16	−10	4 (Note: Ranked on head-to-head points: Bayer Leverkusen 4, Lokomotiv Moscow 1.)		0–5	0–2	—	2–2
4	(Russia) Lokomotiv Moscow	6	1	1	4	7	13	−6	4		0–1	2–3	1–3	—

Source: UEFA
Rules for classification: Tiebreakers
Notes:
18 September 2019
14:00

Atlético Madrid (Spain)	0–4	(Italy) Juventus
	Report	Fagioli 18' (pen.); Ahamada 39'; Moreno 64', 70'

Centro Deportivo Wanda, Alcalá de Henares
Attendance: 333
Referee: Erik Lambrechts (Belgium)
18 September 2019
14:00

Bayer Leverkusen (Germany)	2–2	(Russia) Lokomotiv Moscow
Rüth 4' (pen.); Scott 15'	Report	Karev 79'; Ivankov 88'

Kleines Ulrich-Haberland-Stadion, Leverkusen
Attendance: 430
Referee: Ívar Orri Kristjánsson (Iceland)

1 October 2019
13:30 (14:30 UTC+3)

Lokomotiv Moscow (Russia)	2–3	(Spain) Atlético Madrid
Osnov 89'; Khlynov 90'	Report	Teguia 45+1'; Riquelme 68', 90+2'

Sapsan Arena, Moscow
Attendance: 508
Referee: Aleksandrs Anufrijevs (Latvia)
1 October 2019
14:00

Juventus (Italy)	4–1	(Germany) Bayer Leverkusen
Sene 16'; Moreno 28'; Fagioli 39' (pen.); Leo 52'	Report	Kemper 86'

Juventus Training Center, Vinovo
Attendance: 295
Referee: Enea Jorgji (Albania)

22 October 2019
14:00

Juventus (Italy)	1–2	(Russia) Lokomotiv Moscow
Gozzi 83'	Report	Petrov 29'; Petukhov 77' (pen.)

Juventus Training Center, Vinovo
Attendance: 276
Referee: Duje Strukan (Croatia)
22 October 2019
14:00

Atlético Madrid (Spain)	2–0	(Germany) Bayer Leverkusen
Moreno 76'; Bukusu 82' (o.g.)	Report

Centro Deportivo Wanda, Alcalá de Henares
Attendance: 205
Referee: Alain Durieux (Luxembourg)

6 November 2019
13:00 (15:00 UTC+3)

Lokomotiv Moscow (Russia)	0–1	(Italy) Juventus
	Report	Petrelli 36'

Sapsan Arena, Moscow
Attendance: 718
Referee: Rauf Jabarov (Azerbaijan)
6 November 2019
14:00

Bayer Leverkusen (Germany)	0–2	(Spain) Atlético Madrid
	Report	Salido 58'; Jeronimo 88'

Kleines Ulrich-Haberland-Stadion, Leverkusen
Attendance: 450
Referee: Karim Abed (France)

26 November 2019
12:00 (14:00 UTC+3)

Lokomotiv Moscow (Russia)	1–3	(Germany) Bayer Leverkusen
Petukhov 65' (pen.)	Report	Anapak 76'; Fesenmeyer 80', 90+3'

Sapsan Arena, Moscow
Attendance: 262
Referee: Boris Marhefka (Slovakia)
26 November 2019
14:00

Juventus (Italy)	2–1	(Spain) Atlético Madrid
Moreno 78'; Gozzi 90+4'	Report	Salido 25'

Juventus Training Center, Vinovo
Attendance: 293
Referee: Bartosz Frankowski (Poland)

11 December 2019
14:00

Bayer Leverkusen (Germany)	0–5	(Italy) Juventus
	Report	Da Graca 40', 90+4' (pen.); Sene 44'; Petrelli 49'; Sekulov 66'

Kleines Ulrich-Haberland-Stadion, Leverkusen
Attendance: 340
Referee: Admir Šehović (Bosnia and Herzegovina)
11 December 2019
16:00

Atlético Madrid (Spain)	3–0	(Russia) Lokomotiv Moscow
Quintana 73' (pen.); Tenas 80'; Soto 88'	Report

Centro Deportivo Wanda, Alcalá de Henares
Attendance: 165
Referee: Loukas Sotiriou (Cyprus)

=== Group E ===
Pos	Team	Pld	W	D	L	GF	GA	GD	Pts	Qualification	LIV	SAL	GNK	NAP
1	(England) Liverpool	6	4	1	1	17	6	+11	13	Round of 16	—	4–2	0–1	7–0
2	(Austria) Red Bull Salzburg	6	3	1	2	19	11	+8	10	Play-offs	2–3	—	1–1	7–2
3	(Belgium) Genk	6	2	2	2	5	6	−1	8		0–2	0–2	—	3–1
4	(Italy) Napoli	6	0	2	4	5	23	−18	2		1–1	1–5	0–0	—

Source: UEFA
Rules for classification: Tiebreakers
17 September 2019
14:00

Napoli (Italy)	1–1	(England) Liverpool
Mancino 29'	Report	Stewart 86'

Stadio Comunale Pasquale Ianniello, Frattamaggiore
Attendance: 557
Referee: Trustin Farrugia Cann (Malta)
17 September 2019
15:00

Red Bull Salzburg (Austria)	1–1	(Belgium) Genk
Adeyemi 32'	Report	Vandermeulen 80' (pen.)

Untersberg-Arena, Grödig
Attendance: 748
Referee: Kaarlo Oskari Hämäläinen (Finland)

2 October 2019
13:00

Genk (Belgium)	3–1	(Italy) Napoli
Vandermeulen 51' (pen.); Cuypers 55'; Németh 90+1'	Report	Gaetano 62'

Luminus Arena stadium B, Genk
Attendance: 423
Referee: Daniyar Sakhi (Kazakhstan)
2 October 2019
16:00 (15:00 UTC+1)

Liverpool (England)	4–2	(Austria) Red Bull Salzburg
Larouci 4'; Williams 78'; Jones 82'; Brewster 90+4' (pen.)	Report	Adeyemi 21'; Affengruber 63'

Totally Wicked Stadium, St Helens
Attendance: 347
Referee: Bryn Markham-Jones (Wales)

23 October 2019
14:00

Genk (Belgium)	0–2	(England) Liverpool
	Report	Stewart 22' (pen.); Jones 73'

Luminus Arena stadium B, Genk
Attendance: 1,943
Referee: Kristoffer Karlsson (Sweden)
23 October 2019
15:00

Red Bull Salzburg (Austria)	7–2	(Italy) Napoli
Šeško 8', 14'; Anselm 46'; Luis Phelipe 47'; Adamu 64'; Sučić 82'; Seiwald 90+2'	Report	Costanzo 7'; Vrikkis 72' (pen.)

Untersberg-Arena, Grödig
Attendance: 680
Referee: Aleksei Matyunin (Russia)

5 November 2019
14:00

Napoli (Italy)	1–5	(Austria) Red Bull Salzburg
Gaetano 69'	Report	Seiwald 13'; Luis Phelipe 28'; Affengruber 42'; Sučić 53' (pen.); Šeško 74'

Stadio Comunale Pasquale Ianniello, Frattamaggiore
Attendance: 394
Referee: Dumitri Muntean (Moldova)
5 November 2019
15:00 (14:00 UTC+0)

Liverpool (England)	0–1	(Belgium) Genk
	Report	Krawczyk 90+3'

Liverpool FC Academy Training Ground, Kirkby
Attendance: 0
Referee: Rob Hennessy (Republic of Ireland)

27 November 2019
14:00

Genk (Belgium)	0–2	(Austria) Red Bull Salzburg
	Report	Adeyemi 15'; Sučić 20' (pen.)

Luminus Arena stadium B, Genk
Attendance: 1,723
Referee: Nicholas Walsh (Scotland)
27 November 2019
16:00 (15:00 UTC+1)

Liverpool (England)	7–0	(Italy) Napoli
Cain 4'; Jones 18' (pen.), 24', 52'; Dixon-Bonner 22'; Longstaff 27', 63'	Report

Liverpool FC Academy Training Ground, Kirkby
Attendance: 356
Referee: Tihomir Pejin (Croatia)

10 December 2019
13:00

Napoli (Italy)	0–0	(Belgium) Genk
	Report

Stadio Comunale Pasquale Ianniello, Frattamaggiore
Attendance: 218
Referee: Zbynek Proske (Czech Republic)
10 December 2019
14:00

Red Bull Salzburg (Austria)	2–3	(England) Liverpool
Sučić 11'; Anselm 24'	Report	Elliott 67' (pen.); Hill 79'; Bearne 90+3'

Untersberg-Arena, Grödig
Attendance: 980
Referee: Fran Jović (Croatia)

=== Group F ===
Pos	Team	Pld	W	D	L	GF	GA	GD	Pts	Qualification	INT	DOR	SLP	BAR
1	(Italy) Inter Milan	6	4	0	2	15	7	+8	12 (Note: Tied on head-to-head points (3). Ranked on head-to-head goal difference: Inter Milan +2, Borussia Dortmund −2.)	Round of 16	—	4–1	4–0	2–0
2	(Germany) Borussia Dortmund	6	4	0	2	12	9	+3	12	Play-offs	2–1	—	5–1	2–1
3	(Czech Republic) Slavia Prague	6	3	0	3	9	16	−7	9		4–1	1–0	—	0–4
4	(Spain) Barcelona	6	1	0	5	8	12	−4	3		0–3	1–2	2–3	—

Source: UEFA
Rules for classification: Tiebreakers
Notes:
17 September 2019
14:00

Inter Milan (Italy)	4–0	(Czech Republic) Slavia Prague
Esposito 29', 58' (pen.); Oristanio 78'; Vergani 90+1' (pen.)	Report

Stadio Breda, Sesto San Giovanni
Attendance: 412
Referee: Marcel Bîrsan (Romania)
17 September 2019
16:00

Borussia Dortmund (Germany)	2–1	(Spain) Barcelona
Reyna 60'; Raschl 70' (pen.)	Report	Gomes 3'

Dortmund Brackel Training Ground, Dortmund
Attendance: 1,050
Referee: Jørgen Daugbjerg Burchardt (Denmark)

2 October 2019
14:00

Slavia Prague (Czech Republic)	1–0	(Germany) Borussia Dortmund
João Felipe 56'	Report

Na Chvalech, Prague
Attendance: 700
Referee: Nejc Kajtazovic (Slovenia)
2 October 2019
16:00

Barcelona (Spain)	0–3	(Italy) Inter Milan
	Report	Oristanio 28'; Gianelli 77'; Colombini 86'

Estadi Johan Cruyff, Sant Joan Despí
Attendance: 909
Referee: António Nobre (Portugal)

23 October 2019
14:00

Slavia Prague (Czech Republic)	0–4	(Spain) Barcelona
	Report	De la Fuente 48', 74'; Mortimer 51'; Jardí 60'

Na Chvalech, Prague
Attendance: 1,300
Referee: Donatas Rumšas (Lithuania)
23 October 2019
16:00

Inter Milan (Italy)	4–1	(Germany) Borussia Dortmund
Persyn 24'; Fonseca 31', 46', 49'	Report	Moukoko 8'

Stadio Breda, Sesto San Giovanni
Attendance: 550
Referee: Danilo Grujić (Serbia)

5 November 2019
14:00

Barcelona (Spain)	2–3	(Czech Republic) Slavia Prague
De la Fuente 16'; Mortimer 86'	Report	Červ 41' (pen.); Kosek 56'; Toula 87'

Estadi Johan Cruyff, Sant Joan Despí
Attendance: 767
Referee: Nathan Verboomen (Belgium)
5 November 2019
14:00

Borussia Dortmund (Germany)	2–1	(Italy) Inter Milan
Knauff 49', 66'	Report	Vergani 61'

Dortmund Brackel Training Ground, Dortmund
Attendance: 485
Referee: Mohammed Al-Hakim (Sweden)

27 November 2019
13:00

Slavia Prague (Czech Republic)	4–1	(Italy) Inter Milan
João Felipe 32', 41', 49'; Červ 53'	Report	Fonseca 29'

Na Chvalech, Prague
Attendance: 650
Referee: Trustin Farrugia Cann (Malta)
27 November 2019
14:00

Barcelona (Spain)	1–2	(Germany) Borussia Dortmund
Fernández 17'	Report	Reyna 26'; Raschl 65'

Estadi Johan Cruyff, Sant Joan Despí
Attendance: 1,528
Referee: Aleksandrs Anufrijevs (Latvia)

10 December 2019
16:00

Inter Milan (Italy)	2–0	(Spain) Barcelona
Oristanio 42'; Youte Kinkoue 90+1'	Report

Stadio Breda, Sesto San Giovanni
Attendance: 600
Referee: Enea Jorgji (Albania)
10 December 2019
16:00

Borussia Dortmund (Germany)	5–1	(Czech Republic) Slavia Prague
Moukoko 26', 34', 64'; Reyna 39', 59'	Report	Toula 74'

Dortmund Brackel Training Ground, Dortmund
Attendance: 1,119
Referee: Vilhjalmur Thorarinsson (Iceland)

=== Group G ===
Pos	Team	Pld	W	D	L	GF	GA	GD	Pts	Qualification	BEN	LYO	RBL	ZEN
1	(Portugal) Benfica	6	5	0	1	17	6	+11	15	Round of 16	—	1–2	2–1	1–0
2	(France) Lyon	6	4	0	2	13	10	+3	12	Play-offs	2–3	—	1–0	4–2
3	(Germany) RB Leipzig	6	1	1	4	5	10	−5	4 (Note: Ranked on head-to-head points: RB Leipzig 4, Zenit Saint Petersburg 1.)		0–3	1–3	—	1–1
4	(Russia) Zenit Saint Petersburg	6	1	1	4	7	16	−9	4		1–7	3–1	0–2	—

Source: UEFA
Rules for classification: Tiebreakers
Notes:
17 September 2019
15:00

Lyon (France)	4–2	(Russia) Zenit Saint Petersburg
Cherki 48'; Soumaré 55'; Thomas 74'; Coly 90+4' (pen.)	Report	Bachinsky 45+2'; Kosarev 90+1'

Groupama OL Training Center, Décines-Charpieu
Attendance: 431
Referee: Fedayi San (Switzerland)
17 September 2019
16:00 (15:00 UTC+1)

Benfica (Portugal)	2–1	(Germany) RB Leipzig
Dantas 15'; T. Araújo 87'	Report	Holm 52'

Benfica Campus, Seixal
Attendance: 579
Referee: Zbyněk Proske (Czech Republic)

2 October 2019
13:00 (14:00 UTC+3)

Zenit Saint Petersburg (Russia)	1–7	(Portugal) Benfica
Simutenkov 75' (pen.)	Report	Embaló 2'; Gouveia 15', 52'; Dantas 20' (pen.); Camará 48'; Ramos 56'; J. Tavares 81'

Smena Stadium, Saint Petersburg
Attendance: 339
Referee: Alexander Harkam (Austria)
2 October 2019
15:00

RB Leipzig (Germany)	1–3	(France) Lyon
Holm 43'	Report	Coly 31'; Cherki 51' (pen.); Wissa 90+2'

Stadion am Cottaweg, Leipzig
Attendance: 541
Referee: Barbeno Luca (San Marino)

23 October 2019
14:00

RB Leipzig (Germany)	1–1	(Russia) Zenit Saint Petersburg
Holm 3'	Report	Kravtsov 53'

Stadion am Cottaweg, Leipzig
Attendance: 471
Referee: Athanasios Tzilos (Greece)
23 October 2019
16:00 (15:00 UTC+1)

Benfica (Portugal)	1–2	(France) Lyon
Dantas 37' (pen.)	Report	Cherki 9', 90+3'

Benfica Campus, Seixal
Attendance: 937
Referee: Alan Mario Sant (Malta)

5 November 2019
12:00 (14:00 UTC+3)

Zenit Saint Petersburg (Russia)	0–2	(Germany) RB Leipzig
	Report	Amédédjisso 55', 74'

Smena Stadium, Saint Petersburg
Attendance: 266
Referee: Vasili Kazartsev (Russia)
5 November 2019
16:00

Lyon (France)	2–3	(Portugal) Benfica
Dib 57'; Wissa 86'	Report	Embaló 29'; Morato 35'; Gouveia 84'

Groupama OL Training Center, Décines-Charpieu
Attendance: 633
Referee: Jens Maae (Denmark)

27 November 2019
12:00 (14:00 UTC+3)

Zenit Saint Petersburg (Russia)	3–1	(France) Lyon
Shamkin 19'; Kosarev 37'; Kravtsov 46'	Report	Da Silva 90+2'

Smena Stadium, Saint Petersburg
Attendance: 258
Referee: Zaven Hovhannisyan (Armenia)
27 November 2019
15:00

RB Leipzig (Germany)	0–3	(Portugal) Benfica
	Report	Bernardo 24', 76'; Ramos 28'

Stadion am Cottaweg, Leipzig
Attendance: 611
Referee: Bojan Pandžić (Sweden)

10 December 2019
15:00

Lyon (France)	1–0	(Germany) RB Leipzig
Duku 54'	Report

Groupama OL Training Center, Décines-Charpieu
Attendance: 512
Referee: Luis Teixeira (Andorra)
10 December 2019
16:00 (15:00 UTC+0)

Benfica (Portugal)	1–0	(Russia) Zenit Saint Petersburg
Odoyevskiy 59' (o.g.)	Report

Benfica Campus, Seixal
Attendance: 589
Referee: Matthew De Gabriele (Malta)

=== Group H ===
Pos	Team	Pld	W	D	L	GF	GA	GD	Pts	Qualification	AJX	LIL	CHE	VAL
1	(Netherlands) Ajax	6	3	2	1	13	7	+6	11	Round of 16	—	4–0	0–1	1–1
2	(France) Lille	6	3	1	2	7	8	−1	10	Play-offs	1–2	—	2–0	1–0
3	(England) Chelsea	6	1	3	2	7	9	−2	6		1–1	1–1	—	3–3
4	(Spain) Valencia	6	1	2	3	10	13	−3	5		3–5	1–2	2–1	—

Source: UEFA
Rules for classification: Tiebreakers
17 September 2019
14:00

Ajax (Netherlands)	4–0	(France) Lille
Regeer 4'; Ünüvar 19'; Hansen 36'; Rasmussen 90+3'	Report

Sportpark De Toekomst, Ouder-Amstel
Attendance: 850
Referee: Roomer Tarajev (Estonia)
17 September 2019
14:00 (13:00 UTC+1)

Chelsea (England)	3–3	(Spain) Valencia
Anjorin 13' (pen.), 36' (pen.); Broja 61'	Report	González 9'; Koindredi 23', 84'

Cobham Training Centre, Stoke d'Abernon
Attendance: 0
Referee: Paul McLaughlin (Republic of Ireland)

2 October 2019
14:00

Valencia (Spain)	3–5	(Netherlands) Ajax
Gozálbez 26'; Ruiz 69'; González 71'	Report	Regeer 16', 41', 59'; Musampa 23'; Gutiérrez 52' (o.g.)

Estadio Antonio Puchades, Paterna
Attendance: 950
Referee: Bojan Pandžić (Sweden)
2 October 2019
14:00

Lille (France)	2–0	(England) Chelsea
Fatar 45+1' (pen.); Ouattara 90+3'	Report

Area de Luchin, Lille
Attendance: 520
Referee: Petri Viljanen (Finland)

23 October 2019
14:00

Lille (France)	1–0	(Spain) Valencia
Fatar 20'	Report

Area de Luchin, Lille
Attendance: 487
Referee: Vilhjalmur Thorarinsson (Iceland)
23 October 2019
14:00

Ajax (Netherlands)	0–1	(England) Chelsea
	Report	Ballo 2'

Sportpark De Toekomst, Ouder-Amstel
Attendance: 1,633
Referee: Adrien Jaccottet (Switzerland)

5 November 2019
14:00

Valencia (Spain)	1–2	(France) Lille
Alemañ 59'	Report	Ouattara 74', 86'

Estadio Antonio Puchades, Paterna
Attendance: 566
Referee: Fabio Verissimo (Portugal)
5 November 2019
16:00 (15:00 UTC+0)

Chelsea (England)	1–1	(Netherlands) Ajax
McEachran 33'	Report	Douglas 51'

Cobham Training Centre, Stoke d'Abernon
Attendance: 225
Referee: Donald Robertson (Scotland)

27 November 2019
14:00

Lille (France)	1–2	(Netherlands) Ajax
Ouattara 68'	Report	Brobbey 3'; Taylor 7'

Area de Luchin, Lille
Attendance: 610
Referee: Sergei Lapochkin (Russia)
27 November 2019
14:00

Valencia (Spain)	2–1	(England) Chelsea
Menargues 20'; Escobar 76'	Report	Lawrence 26'

Estadio Antonio Puchades, Paterna
Attendance: 640
Referee: Jonathan Lardot (Belgium)

10 December 2019
14:00

Ajax (Netherlands)	1–1	(Spain) Valencia
Regeer 69'	Report	Contell 50'

Sportpark De Toekomst, Ouder-Amstel
Attendance: 850
Referee: Giorgi Kruashvili (Georgia)
10 December 2019
14:00 (13:00 UTC+0)

Chelsea (England)	1–1	(France) Lille
Ben Hamed 16' (o.g.)	Report	Ramet 88'

Cobham Training Centre, Stoke d'Abernon
Attendance: 125
Referee: Rob Harvey (Republic of Ireland)
