= 2019–20 UEFA Youth League knockout phase =

European club football tournament

The 2019–20 UEFA Youth League knockout phase (knockout round play-offs and round of 16 onwards) began on 11 February 2020 with the play-off round and ended with the final on 25 August 2020 at Colovray Stadium in Nyon, Switzerland, to decide the champions of the 2019–20 UEFA Youth League. A total of 24 teams competed in the knockout phase (knockout round play-offs and round of 16 onwards).

Times are CET/CEST, (Note: CET (UTC+1) for dates up to 28 March 2020 (knockout round play-offs and six round of 16 matches in March 2020), and CEST (UTC+2) for dates thereafter (all matches in August 2020, including two round of 16 matches, quarter-finals, semi-finals and final).) as listed by UEFA (local times, if different, are in parentheses).

== Qualified teams ==
=== UEFA Champions League Path ===
Group	Winners (enter round of 16)	Runners-up (enter play-offs as away team)
A	(Spain) Real Madrid	(Belgium) Club Brugge
B	(Germany) Bayern Munich	(Serbia) Red Star Belgrade
C	(Italy) Atalanta	(Croatia) Dinamo Zagreb
D	(Italy) Juventus	(Spain) Atlético Madrid
E	(England) Liverpool	(Austria) Red Bull Salzburg
F	(Italy) Inter Milan	(Germany) Borussia Dortmund
G	(Portugal) Benfica	(France) Lyon
H	(Netherlands) Ajax	(France) Lille

=== Domestic Champions Path ===
Second round winners
(enter play-offs as home team)
(Moldova) Sheriff Tiraspol
(Spain) Zaragoza
(Denmark) Midtjylland
(England) Derby County
(Portugal) Porto
(Ukraine) Dynamo Kyiv
(Scotland) Rangers
(France) Rennes

== Format ==
The knockout phase (knockout round play-offs and round of 16 onwards), played as a single-elimination tournament, involved 24 teams: sixteen teams which qualified from the UEFA Champions League Path (eight group winners and eight group runners-up), and eight teams which qualified from the Domestic Champions Path (eight second round winners):

- The eight group winners from the UEFA Champions League Path entered the round of 16.
- The eight group runners-up from the UEFA Champions League Path and the eight second round winners from the Domestic Champions Path entered the knockout round play-offs. The eight play-off winners advanced to the round of 16.

Each tie was played over a single match. If the score was level after full-time, the match was decided by a penalty shoot-out (no extra time was played).

== Schedule ==
The schedule was as follows (all draws were held at the UEFA headquarters in Nyon, Switzerland).

Following the round of 16, the competition was postponed indefinitely due to the COVID-19 pandemic in Europe. The final tournament consisting of the semi-finals and final, originally scheduled to be played on 17 and 20 April 2020 at the Colovray Stadium in Nyon, Switzerland, were officially postponed on 18 March 2020. A working group was set up by UEFA to decide the calendar of the remainder of the season, with the final decision made at the UEFA Executive Committee meeting on 17 June 2020.

Knockout phase schedule
Round	Draw	Match dates
Knockout round play-offs	16 December 2019	11–12 February 2020
Round of 16	14 February 2020	3–4 March 2020; 10 March 2020 (Note: One round of 16 match postponed due to COVID-19 pandemic in Europe); 16 August 2020 at Colovray Stadium, Nyon (Note: Two round of 16 matches postponed and relocated due to COVID-19 pandemic in Europe)
Quarter-finals	14 February 2020	18–19 August 2020 at Colovray Stadium, Nyon (Note: Quarter-finals originally scheduled for 17–18 March 2020, but postponed and relocated due to COVID-19 pandemic in Europe)
Semi-finals	14 February 2020	22 August 2020 at Colovray Stadium, Nyon (Note: Semi-finals originally scheduled for 17 April 2020, but postponed due to COVID-19 pandemic in Europe)
Final	14 February 2020	25 August 2020 at Colovray Stadium, Nyon (Note: Final originally scheduled for 20 April 2020, but postponed due to COVID-19 pandemic in Europe)

== Bracket ==
The draw for the round of 16 onwards was held on 14 February 2020, 13:00 CET (UTC+1), at the UEFA headquarters in Nyon, Switzerland. The mechanism of the draws for each round was as follows:

- In the draw for the round of 16, there were no seedings, and the sixteen teams (eight UEFA Champions League Path group winners and eight play-off winners) were drawn into eight ties. Teams from the same UEFA Champions League Path group could not be drawn against each other, but teams from the same association could be drawn against each other. The draw also decided the home team for each round of 16 match.
- In the draws for the quarter-finals onwards, there were no seedings, and teams from the same UEFA Champions League Path group or the same association could be drawn against each other (the identity of the quarter-final winners and onwards was not known at the time of the draws). The draws also decided the home team for each quarter-final, and which quarter-final and semi-final winners were designated as the "home" team for each semi-final and final (for administrative purposes as they were played at a neutral venue).

Knockout round play-offs
(Ukraine) Dynamo Kyiv	0 (3)
(Croatia) Dinamo Zagreb (p)	0 (4)
(Moldova) Sheriff Tiraspol	0 (2)
(Serbia) Red Star Belgrade (p)	0 (4)
(Denmark) Midtjylland (p)	1 (7)
(France) Lille	1 (6)
(Scotland) Rangers	0
(Spain) Atlético Madrid	4
(Portugal) Porto	1 (6)
(Austria) Red Bull Salzburg (p)	1 (7)
(England) Derby County	3
(Germany) Borussia Dortmund	1
(Spain) Zaragoza	1
(France) Lyon	3
(France) Rennes (p)	1 (5)
(Belgium) Club Brugge	1 (3)

Round of 16
(Germany) Bayern Munich	2 (5)
(Croatia) Dinamo Zagreb (p)	2 (6)
(Portugal) Benfica	4
(England) Liverpool	1
(Serbia) Red Star Belgrade	0
(Denmark) Midtjylland	3
(Netherlands) Ajax (p)	0 (6)
(Spain) Atlético Madrid	0 (5)
(Austria) Red Bull Salzburg	4
(England) Derby County	1
(Italy) Atalanta	3 (3)
(France) Lyon (p)	3 (5)
(Italy) Inter Milan	1
(France) Rennes	0
(Italy) Juventus	1
(Spain) Real Madrid	3

Quarter-finals
18 August – Nyon
(Croatia) Dinamo Zagreb	1
(Portugal) Benfica	3
18 August – Nyon
(Denmark) Midtjylland	1
(Netherlands) Ajax	3
19 August – Nyon
(Austria) Red Bull Salzburg	4
(France) Lyon	3
19 August – Nyon
(Italy) Inter Milan	0
(Spain) Real Madrid	3

Semi-finals
22 August – Nyon
(Portugal) Benfica	3
(Netherlands) Ajax	0
22 August – Nyon
(Austria) Red Bull Salzburg	1
(Spain) Real Madrid	2

Final
25 August – Nyon
(Portugal) Benfica	2
(Spain) Real Madrid	3

== Knockout round play-offs ==
The draw for the knockout round play-offs was held on 16 December 2019, 14:00 CET (UTC+1), at the UEFA headquarters in Nyon, Switzerland. The eight second round winners from the Domestic Champions Path were drawn against the eight group runners-up from the UEFA Champions League Path, with the teams from the Domestic Champions Path hosting the match. Teams from the same association could not be drawn against each other.

=== Summary ===
The matches were played on 11 and 12 February 2020. The eight play-off winners advanced to the round of 16, where they were joined by the eight group winners from the UEFA Champions League Path.

Home team	Score	Away team
Derby County (England)	3–1	(Germany) Borussia Dortmund
Porto (Portugal)	1–1 (6–7 p)	(Austria) Red Bull Salzburg
Zaragoza (Spain)	1–3	(France) Lyon
Dynamo Kyiv (Ukraine)	0–0 (3–4 p)	(Croatia) Dinamo Zagreb
Sheriff Tiraspol (Moldova)	0–0 (2–4 p)	(Serbia) Red Star Belgrade
Rangers (Scotland)	0–4	(Spain) Atlético Madrid
Midtjylland (Denmark)	1–1 (7–6 p)	(France) Lille
Rennes (France)	1–1 (5–3 p)	(Belgium) Club Brugge

=== Matches ===
11 February 2020
14:00 (13:00 UTC+0)

Derby County (England)	3–1	(Germany) Borussia Dortmund
Cashin 47'; J. Brown 51'; Sibley 90+5'	Report	Khadra 62'

Pride Park Stadium, Derby
Attendance: 674
Referee: Kevin Clancy (Scotland)

12 February 2020
16:00 (15:00 UTC+0)

Porto (Portugal)	1–1	(Austria) Red Bull Salzburg
Vieira 39' (pen.)	Report	Affengruber 23'
Penalties
Vieira (penalty scored); Sousa (penalty scored); Valente (penalty missed); Moreira (penalty scored); Faustino (penalty missed); Pereira (penalty scored); Justiniano (penalty scored); Pinheiro (penalty scored); Meixedo (penalty missed)	6–7	(penalty scored) Pokorný; (penalty scored) Prass; (penalty scored) Sučić; (penalty missed) Adamu; (penalty missed) Affengruber; (penalty scored) Oroz; (penalty scored) Seiwald; (penalty scored) Adeyemi; (penalty scored) Wallison

CTFD PortoGaia, Vila Nova de Gaia
Attendance: 610
Referee: Halil Umut Meler (Turkey)

12 February 2020
18:00

Zaragoza (Spain)	1–3	(France) Lyon
Hernández 28'	Report	Gouiri 69', 90+4'; Thomas 80'

La Romareda, Zaragoza
Attendance: 7,150
Referee: Sascha Stegemann (Germany)

12 February 2020
16:00 (17:00 UTC+2)

Dynamo Kyiv (Ukraine)	0–0	(Croatia) Dinamo Zagreb
	Report
Penalties
Nadolskyi (penalty missed); Isayenko (penalty scored); Tsitaishvili (penalty scored); Zabarnyi (penalty scored); Voloshyn (penalty missed)	3–4	(penalty scored) Julardžija; (penalty missed) Janković; (penalty scored) Šipoš; (penalty scored) Gvardiol; (penalty scored) Karrica

Valeriy Lobanovskyi Dynamo Stadium, Kyiv
Attendance: 5,419
Referee: Dumitri Muntean (Moldova)

12 February 2020
17:00 (18:00 UTC+2)

Sheriff Tiraspol (Moldova)	0–0	(Serbia) Red Star Belgrade
	Report
Penalties
Cesnocov (penalty missed); Gliga (penalty scored); Macalici (penalty scored); Ignatov (penalty missed)	2–4	(penalty scored) Burmaz; (penalty scored) Matić; (penalty scored) Blagojević; (penalty scored) Mitrović

Sheriff Small Arena, Tiraspol
Attendance: 1,620
Referee: Ádám Farkas (Hungary)

12 February 2020
14:00 (13:00 UTC+0)

Rangers (Scotland)	0–4	(Spain) Atlético Madrid
	Report	Lama 6'; Quintana 48'; Soriano 78'; Soto 89'

Firhill Stadium, Glasgow
Attendance: 923
Referee: Jérôme Brisard (France)

12 February 2020
14:00

Midtjylland (Denmark)	1–1	(France) Lille
Madsen 14' (pen.)	Report	Niasse 61' (pen.)
Penalties
Hannola (penalty scored); Damtoft (penalty missed); Hansen (penalty scored); Isaksen (penalty scored); Nwadike (penalty scored); Anker (penalty scored); Dyhr (penalty scored); Sørensen (penalty scored)	7–6	(penalty scored) Niasse; (penalty missed) Camara; (penalty scored) Nlandu; (penalty scored) Ceita; (penalty scored) Ouattara; (penalty scored) Ascone; (penalty scored) Diedhiou; (penalty missed) Kanda

MCH Arena, Herning
Attendance: 868
Referee: Rob Hennessy (Republic of Ireland)

12 February 2020
18:00

Rennes (France)	1–1	(Belgium) Club Brugge
Françoise 17'	Report	De Wolf 61' (pen.)
Penalties
Picouleau (penalty scored); Abline (penalty scored); Tchaouna (penalty scored); Doucoure (penalty scored); Rutter (penalty scored)	5–3	(penalty scored) Aelterman; (penalty scored) De Wolf; (penalty missed) De Cuyper; (penalty scored) Ochieng

Stade de la Piverdière Nord 1, Rennes
Attendance: 1,160
Referee: Mads-Kristoffer Kristoffersen (Denmark)

== Round of 16 ==
=== Summary ===
Six of the eight round of 16 matches were played on 3, 4 and 10 March 2020, while the remaining two matches could not be played as scheduled due to concerns over the COVID-19 pandemic in Europe. They were rescheduled to 16 August 2020 at Colovray Stadium, Nyon.

Home team	Score	Away team
Bayern Munich (Germany)	2–2 (5–6 p)	(Croatia) Dinamo Zagreb
Ajax (Netherlands)	0–0 (6–5 p)	(Spain) Atlético Madrid
Atalanta (Italy)	3–3 (3–5 p)	(France) Lyon
Inter Milan (Italy)	1–0	(France) Rennes
Red Bull Salzburg (Austria)	4–1	(England) Derby County
Benfica (Portugal)	4–1	(England) Liverpool
Red Star Belgrade (Serbia)	0–3	(Denmark) Midtjylland
Juventus (Italy)	1–3	(Spain) Real Madrid

=== Matches ===
4 March 2020
14:00

Bayern Munich (Germany)	2–2	(Croatia) Dinamo Zagreb
Dajaku 36'; Gvardiol 88' (o.g.)	Report	Krizmanić 2'; Karrica 29'
Penalties
Batista Meier (penalty scored); Booth (penalty scored); Daniliuc (penalty missed); Tillman (penalty scored); Dajaku (penalty missed); Cuni (penalty scored); Günther (penalty scored); Rhein (penalty missed)	5–6	(penalty scored) Godoy; (penalty missed) Šutalo; (penalty missed) Franjić; (penalty scored) Julardžija; (penalty scored) Krizmanić; (penalty scored) Gvardiol; (penalty scored) Janković; (penalty scored) Hrvoj

FC Bayern Campus, Munich
Attendance: 1,200
Referee: Donald Robertson (Scotland)

3 March 2020
15:00

Ajax (Netherlands)	0–0	(Spain) Atlético Madrid
	Report
Penalties
Timber (penalty missed); Ünüvar (penalty scored); Taylor (penalty scored); Kasanwirjo (penalty missed); Hansen (penalty scored); Douglas (penalty scored); Pinas (penalty scored); Reiziger (penalty scored)	6–5	(penalty missed) Quintana; (penalty scored) Lorenzo; (penalty scored) Ajenjo Hykjek; (penalty missed) Medrano; (penalty scored) Riquelme; (penalty scored) Jeronimo; (penalty scored) Soto; (penalty missed) Cova

Sportpark De Toekomst, Ouder-Amstel
Attendance: 723
Referee: Glenn Nyberg (Sweden)

10 March 2020 (Note: Due to the COVID-19 pandemic in Italy, the following round of 16 matches were postponed: Atalanta vs Lyon, originally to be played on 3 March 2020, 13:00 CET, at Centro Sportivo Bortolotti, Bergamo, was postponed to be played on 10 March 2020, 15:00 CET, at Centro Tecnico Federale di Coverciano, Florence.; Inter Milan vs Rennes, originally to be played on 3 March 2020, 14:00 CET, at Stadio Breda, San Giovanni, was postponed to be played on 11 March 2020, 15:00 CET, at Centro Tecnico Federale di Coverciano, Florence. However, the match was originally cancelled on 9 March as Inter Milan decided not to play the match. UEFA decided not to punish Inter Milan due to the unprecedented situation caused by COVID-19 and following an agreement by both clubs, the match was rescheduled to be played on 16 August 2020, 15:00 CEST, at Colovray Stadium, Nyon.; Juventus vs Real Madrid, originally to be played on 4 March 2020, 16:00 CET, at Juventus Training Ground, Vinovo, was postponed to be played on 11 March 2020, 16:00 CET, at Juventus Training Ground, Vinovo. However, the match was again postponed due to the suspension of flights between Italy and Spain. It is rescheduled to be played on 16 August 2020, 18:00 CEST, at Colovray Stadium, Nyon.)
15:00

Atalanta (Italy)	3–3	(France) Lyon
Piccoli 20', 81'; Cambiaghi 30'	Report	Gouiri 33'; Duku 47'; Cherki 90+4'
Penalties
Guth (penalty scored); Brogni (penalty scored); Piccoli (penalty missed); Amad (penalty scored)	3–5	(penalty scored) Benaissa; (penalty scored) Cherki; (penalty scored) Da Silva; (penalty scored) Wissa; (penalty scored) Gouiri

Centro Tecnico Federale di Coverciano, Florence
Attendance: 24
Referee: Fran Jović (Croatia)

16 August 2020
15:00

Inter Milan (Italy)	1–0	(France) Rennes
Casadei 78'	Report

Colovray Stadium, Nyon
Attendance: 0 (Note: The remainder of the competition, held in August 2020, was played behind closed doors due to the COVID-19 pandemic in Europe.)
Referee: João Pinheiro (Portugal)

4 March 2020
16:00

Red Bull Salzburg (Austria)	4–1	(England) Derby County
Seiwald 3'; Adamu 45+1', 70'; Sučić 90+4'	Report	Wilson 17'

Untersberg-Arena, Grödig
Attendance: 861
Referee: Giorgi Kruashvili (Georgia)

3 March 2020
16:00 (15:00 UTC+0)

Benfica (Portugal)	4–1	(England) Liverpool
Ramos 13', 59'; Dantas 22' (pen.); N. Tavares 26'	Report	Morton 38'

Benfica Campus, Seixal
Attendance: 701
Referee: Michael Fabbri (Italy)

4 March 2020
16:00

Red Star Belgrade (Serbia)	0–3	(Denmark) Midtjylland
	Report	Madsen 43' (pen.); Sørensen 66', 74'

Voždovac Stadium, Belgrade
Attendance: 2,291
Referee: Trustin Farrugia Cann (Malta)

16 August 2020
18:00

Juventus (Italy)	1–3	(Spain) Real Madrid
Tongya 3'	Report	Arribas 31'; Dotor 32'; Latasa 57'

Colovray Stadium, Nyon
Attendance: 0
Referee: Bastian Dankert (Germany)

== Quarter-finals ==
=== Summary ===
The quarter-finals, originally scheduled to be played on 17 and 18 March 2020, were postponed due to concerns over the COVID-19 pandemic in Europe. They were rescheduled to 18 and 19 August 2020 at Colovray Stadium, Nyon.

Team 1	Score	Team 2
Inter Milan (Italy)	0–3	(Spain) Real Madrid
Red Bull Salzburg (Austria)	4–3	(France) Lyon
Midtjylland (Denmark)	1–3	(Netherlands) Ajax
Dinamo Zagreb (Croatia)	1–3	(Portugal) Benfica

=== Matches ===
19 August 2020
18:00

Inter Milan (Italy)	0–3	(Spain) Real Madrid
	Report	Park 64'; Gutiérrez 76' (pen.); Morante 83'

Colovray Stadium, Nyon
Attendance: 0
Referee: Sascha Stegemann (Germany)

19 August 2020
15:00

Red Bull Salzburg (Austria)	4–3	(France) Lyon
Okoh 40'; Adamu 45+1', 54', 55'	Report	Soumaré 30'; Da Silva 71'; Wissa 78'

Colovray Stadium, Nyon
Attendance: 0
Referee: Donatas Rumšas (Lithuania)

18 August 2020
15:00

Midtjylland (Denmark)	1–3	(Netherlands) Ajax
Reiziger 74' (o.g.)	Report	Rasmussen 38'; Hansen 52'; Ideho 77'

Colovray Stadium, Nyon
Attendance: 0
Referee: Anastasios Papapetrou (Greece)

18 August 2020
18:00

Dinamo Zagreb (Croatia)	1–3	(Portugal) Benfica
Karrica 16'	Report	H. Araújo 37'; Ramos 53', 59'

Colovray Stadium, Nyon
Attendance: 0
Referee: Horatiu Fesnic (Romania)

== Semi-finals ==
=== Summary ===
The semi-finals, originally scheduled to be played on 17 April 2020 at Colovray Stadium, Nyon, were postponed due to concerns over the COVID-19 pandemic in Europe. They were rescheduled to 22 August 2020.

Team 1	Score	Team 2
Benfica (Portugal)	3–0	(Netherlands) Ajax
Red Bull Salzburg (Austria)	1–2	(Spain) Real Madrid

=== Matches ===
22 August 2020
15:00

Benfica (Portugal)	3–0	(Netherlands) Ajax
T. Araújo 42'; Embaló 75'; Dantas 79' (pen.)	Report

Colovray Stadium, Nyon
Attendance: 0
Referee: Antti Munukka (Finland)

22 August 2020
18:00

Red Bull Salzburg (Austria)	1–2	(Spain) Real Madrid
Sučić 50' (pen.)	Report	Latasa 4'; Gutiérrez 32'

Colovray Stadium, Nyon
Attendance: 0
Referee: Pavel Orel (Czech Republic)

== Final ==
The final, originally scheduled to be played on 20 April 2020 at Colovray Stadium, Nyon, was postponed due to concerns over the COVID-19 pandemic in Europe. It was rescheduled to 25 August 2020.

25 August 2020
18:00

Benfica (Portugal)	2–3	(Spain) Real Madrid
Ramos 49', 57'	Report	Rodríguez 26'; Jocú 45' (o.g.); Gutiérrez 50'

Colovray Stadium, Nyon
Attendance: 0
Referee: Chris Kavanagh (England)
