= 2019–20 in Croatian football =

Football in Croatia
- Season: 2019–20

Men's football
- Prva HNL: Dinamo Zagreb
- Druga HNL: Šibenik
- Treća HNL: Mladost Ždralovi (North); Junak Sinj (South); Opatija (West); Marsonia (East); Vinogradar (Center)
- Croatian Cup: Rijeka

The following article presents a summary of the 2019–20 football season in Croatia, which was the 29th season of competitive football in the country.

== National teams ==
=== Croatia ===
Date	Venue	Opponents	Score	Croatia scorer(s)	Report
UEFA Euro 2020 qualifying - Group stage
6 September 2019	Anton Malatinský Stadium, Trnava	Slovakia	4–0	Vlašić, Perišić, Petković, Lovren	UEFA.com
9 September 2019	Olympic Stadium, Baku	Azerbaijan	1–1	Modrić	UEFA.com
10 October 2019	Stadion Poljud, Split	Hungary	3–0	Modrić, Petković (2)	UEFA.com
13 October 2019	Cardiff City Stadium, Cardiff	Wales	1–1	Vlašić	UEFA.com
16 November 2019	Stadion Rujevica, Rijeka	Slovakia	3–1	Vlašić, Petković, Perišić	UEFA.com
Friendly fixtures
19 November 2019	Stadion Aldo Drosina, Pula	Georgia	2–1	Kashia (o.g.), Perišić	UEFA.com
26 March 2020	Education City Stadium, Al Rayyan	Switzerland	Cancelled		UEFA.com
30 March 2020	Education City Stadium, Al Rayyan	Portugal	Cancelled		UEFA.com
1 June 2020	Stadion Gradski vrt, Osijek	Turkey	Cancelled		
8 June 2020	Allianz Riviera, Nice	France	Cancelled		

=== Croatia U21 ===
Date	Venue	Opponents	Score	Croatia scorer(s)	Report
2019 UEFA European Under-21 Championship - Group stage
18 June 2019	San Marino Stadium, Serravalle	Romania	1–4	Vlašić	UEFA.com
21 June 2019	San Marino Stadium, Serravalle	France	0–1		UEFA.com
24 June 2019	San Marino Stadium, Serravalle	England	3–3	Brekalo (2), Vlašić	UEFA.com
2021 UEFA European Under-21 Championship qualification - Group stage
10 September 2019	Stadion Šubićevac, Šibenik	Scotland	1–2	Kulenović	UEFA.com
14 October 2019	San Marino Stadium, Serravalle	San Marino	7–0	Kulenović (3), Ivanušec (2), Bistrović, Soldo	UEFA.com
14 November 2019	LFF Stadium, Vilnius	Lithuania	3–1	Ivanušec, Posavec, Bistrović	UEFA.com
18 November 2019	Stadion Radnik, Velika Gorica	Czech Republic	1–2	Ivanušec	UEFA.com
27 March 2020	Tynecastle Park, Edinburgh	Scotland	Postponed		UEFA.com
31 March 2020	Stadion Aldo Drosina, Pula	Lithuania	Postponed		UEFA.com
Friendly fixtures
5 September 2019	Stadion Velika Gorica, Velika Gorica	United Arab Emirates	3–0	Majer, Ivanušec, Bistrović	
11 October 2019	ZTE Arena, Zalaegerszeg	Hungary	4–1	Kulenović, Đurasek, Posavec, Szalai (o.g.)	

=== Croatia U19 ===
Date	Venue	Opponents	Score	Croatia scorer(s)	Report
2020 UEFA European Under-19 Championship qualification - Qualifying round
9 October 2019	Ménfői úti Stadion, Győr	Kazakhstan	3–0	Brnić (2), Čuić	UEFA.com
12 October 2019	ETO Park, Győr	Hungary	2–0	Šarić, Vušković	UEFA.com
15 October 2019	ETO Park, Győr	Georgia	0–2		UEFA.com
2020 UEFA European Under-19 Championship qualification - Elite round
25 March 2020	Stadion Lučko, Zagreb	Turkey	Postponed		UEFA.com
28 March 2020	Stadion Radnik, Velika Gorica	Portugal	Postponed		UEFA.com
31 March 2020	Stadion ŠRC Sesvete, Zagreb	Slovakia	Postponed		UEFA.com

=== Croatia U17 ===
Date	Venue	Opponents	Score	Croatia scorer(s)	Report
2020 UEFA European Under-17 Championship qualification - Qualifying round
22 October 2019	Oriam, Edinburgh	Iceland	3–2	Barišić, Ćubelić, Petrović	UEFA.com
25 October 2019	Oriam, Edinburgh	Armenia	4–0	Duvnjak, Barišić (2), Bilić	UEFA.com
28 October 2019	Forthbank Stadium, Stirling	Scotland	2–1	Kanižaj, Šaranić	UEFA.com
2020 UEFA European Under-17 Championship qualification - Elite round
25 March 2020	Shefayim National Team Complex, Shefayim	Switzerland	Cancelled		UEFA.com
28 March 2020	Netanya Stadium, Netanya	Israel	Cancelled		UEFA.com
31 March 2020	Shefayim National Team Complex, Shefayim	Spain	Cancelled		UEFA.com

=== Croatia Women's ===
Date	Venue	Opponents	Score	Croatia scorer(s)	Report
UEFA Women's Euro 2021 qualifying - Group stage
29 August 2019	Savivaldybė Stadium, Šiauliai	Lithuania	2–1	Dujmenović, Šundov	UEFA.com
3 September 2019	Den Dreef, Leuven	Belgium	1–6	Lojna	UEFA.com
8 October 2019	Stockhorn Arena, Thun	Switzerland	0–2		UEFA.com
8 November 2019	Stadion ŠRC Zaprešić, Zaprešić	Belgium	1–4	Lubina	UEFA.com
10 April 2020	Stadion Šubićevac, Šibenik	Lithuania	Postponed		UEFA.com
14 April 2020	Stadion Šubićevac, Šibenik	Romania	Postponed		UEFA.com
2020 Cyprus Women's Cup
5 March 2020	GSZ Stadium, Larnaca	Mexico	1–1	Lojna	
8 March 2020	AEK Arena, Larnaca	Finland	3–2	Rudelić, Lojna, Landeka	

=== Croatia Women's U19 ===
Date	Venue	Opponents	Score	Croatia scorer(s)	Report
2020 UEFA Women's Under-19 Championship qualification - Qualifying round
2 October 2019	2. Stadion MOSiR Sieradz, Sieradz	Poland	0–2		UEFA.com
5 October 2019	2. Stadion MOSiR Sieradz, Sieradz	Scotland	0–0		UEFA.com
8 October 2019	1. Stadion Miejski al. Unii Lubelskiej 2, Łódź	Bulgaria	0–0		UEFA.com
2020 UEFA Women's Under-19 Championship qualification - Elite round
8 April 2020		Finland	Cancelled		UEFA.com
11 April 2020		Russia	Cancelled		UEFA.com
14 April 2020		Austria	Cancelled		UEFA.com

=== Croatia Women's U17 ===
Date	Venue	Opponents	Score	Croatia scorer(s)	Report
2020 UEFA Women's Under-17 Championship qualification - Qualifying round
21 October 2019	Bosnia and Herzegovina FA Training Centre, Zenica	England	0–2		UEFA.com
24 October 2019	Bosnia and Herzegovina FA Training Centre, Zenica	Belgium	0–1		UEFA.com
27 October 2019	Bosnia and Herzegovina FA Training Centre, Zenica	Bosnia and Herzegovina	1–0	Novak	UEFA.com
2020 UEFA Women's Under-17 Championship qualification - Elite round
14 March 2020	Sportpark Parkzicht, Uden	Germany	Cancelled		UEFA.com
17 March 2020	Sportpark Parkzicht, Uden	Netherlands	Cancelled		UEFA.com
20 March 2020	De Wieën, Venray	Scotland	Cancelled		UEFA.com

== League tables ==
=== Croatian First Football League ===
Pos	Team	Pld	W	D	L	GF	GA	GD	Pts	Qualification or relegation
1	Dinamo Zagreb (C)	36	25	5	6	62	20	+42	80	Qualification for the Champions League second qualifying round
2	Lokomotiva	36	19	8	9	57	38	+19	65	Qualification for the Champions League second qualifying round
3	Rijeka	36	19	7	10	58	42	+16	64	Qualification for the Europa League third qualifying round
4	Osijek	36	17	11	8	47	29	+18	62	Qualification for the Europa League second qualifying round
5	Hajduk Split	36	18	6	12	60	41	+19	60	Qualification for the Europa League second qualifying round
6	Gorica	36	12	13	11	44	48	−4	49	
7	Slaven Belupo	36	10	9	17	34	51	−17	39	
8	Varaždin	36	9	9	18	29	50	−21	36	
9	Istra 1961 (O)	36	5	10	21	27	59	−32	25	Qualification for the Relegation play-offs
10	Inter Zaprešić (R)	36	3	8	25	32	72	−40	17	Relegation to Croatian Second Football League

Source: PrvaHNL.hr
Rules for classification: 1) Points; 2) Head-to-head points; 3) Head-to-head goal difference; 4) Head-to-head goals scored (at home if two teams tied); 5) Goal difference; 6) Goals scored; 7) Play-off
(Note: Criteria 2-4 and 7 is only used if deciding champion, teams to international competition or teams for relegation and in that case criteria 6 will not be used).
(C) Champions; (O) Play-off winners; (R) Relegated

=== Croatian Second Football League ===
Pos	Team	Pld	W	D	L	GF	GA	GD	Pts	Qualification or relegation (Note: Dinamo Zagreb II, Hajduk Split II and Osijek II are ineligible for promotion)
1	Šibenik	19	13	2	4	26	15	+11	41	Promotion to the Croatian First Football League
2	Croatia Zmijavci	19	10	3	6	28	17	+11	33	
3	Orijent 1919	19	9	6	4	26	23	+3	33	Qualification to the promotion play-off
4	Sesvete	19	8	5	6	28	22	+6	29	
5	Rudeš	19	8	5	6	25	20	+5	29	
6	Hajduk Split II	19	7	6	6	29	23	+6	27	
7	Osijek II	19	7	5	7	26	19	+7	26	
8	Dinamo Zagreb II	19	7	5	7	20	21	−1	26	
9	Hrvatski Dragovoljac	19	7	5	7	21	26	−5	26	
10	Dugopolje	19	7	4	8	30	31	−1	25	
11	Međimurje	19	6	5	8	26	26	0	23	
12	Dubrava	19	6	5	8	21	24	−3	23	
13	Kustošija	19	6	5	8	19	27	−8	23	
14	BSK Bijelo Brdo	19	6	4	9	18	23	−5	22	Qualification to the relegation play-offs
15	Solin	19	5	4	10	22	27	−5	19	Relegation to the Croatian Third Football League
16	Cibalia	19	2	7	10	13	34	−21	13	Relegation to the Croatian Third Football League

Updated to match(es) played on 8 March 2020. Source: Druga-HNL.com
Rules for classification: 1) Points; 2) Head-to-head points; 3) Head-to-head goal difference; 4) Head-to-head goals scored (at home if two teams tied); 5) Goal difference; 6) Goals scored; 7) Play-off
(Note: Criteria 2-4 and 7 is only used if deciding champion, teams for promotion or relegation and in that case criteria 6 will not be used).

== Croatian clubs in Europe ==
=== Summary ===
Club	Competition	Starting round	Final round	Matches played
Dinamo Zagreb	Champions League	2nd qualifying round	Group stage	12
Rijeka	Europa League	3rd qualifying round	Play-off round	4
Osijek	Europa League	2nd qualifying round		2
Hajduk Split	Europa League	1st qualifying round		2
ŽNK Split	Women's Champions League	Qualifying round		3
Dinamo Zagreb U19	UEFA Youth League	Group stage	Quarter-finals	9

=== Dinamo Zagreb ===
Date	Venue	Opponents	Score	Dinamo Zagreb scorer(s)	Report
2019–20 Champions League - Second qualifying round
23 July 2019	Mikheil Meskhi Stadium, Tbilisi	(Georgia (country)) Saburtalo Tbilisi	2–0	Oršić, Petković	UEFA.com
30 July 2019	Stadion Maksimir, Zagreb	(Georgia (country)) Saburtalo Tbilisi	3–0	Oršić, Petković, Olmo	UEFA.com
2019–20 Champions League - Third qualifying round
6 August 2019	Stadion Maksimir, Zagreb	(Hungary) Ferencváros	1–1	Olmo	UEFA.com
13 August 2019	Groupama Arena, Budapest	(Hungary) Ferencváros	4–0	Ademi, Petković, Olmo, Gojak	UEFA.com
2019–20 Champions League - Play-off round
21 August 2019	Stadion Maksimir, Zagreb	(Norway) Rosenborg	2–0	Petković, Oršić	UEFA.com
27 August 2019	Lerkendal Stadion, Trondheim	(Norway) Rosenborg	1–1	Gojak	UEFA.com
2019–20 Champions League - Group stage
18 September 2019	Stadion Maksimir, Zagreb	(Italy) Atalanta	4–0	Leovac, Oršić (3)	UEFA.com
1 October 2019	City of Manchester Stadium, Manchester	(England) Manchester City	0–2		UEFA.com
22 October 2019	Metalist Stadium, Kharkiv	(Ukraine) Shakhtar Donetsk	2–2	Olmo, Oršić	UEFA.com
6 November 2019	Stadion Maksimir, Zagreb	(Ukraine) Shakhtar Donetsk	3–3	Petković, Ivanušec, Ademi	UEFA.com
26 November 2019	San Siro, Milan	(Italy) Atalanta	0–2		UEFA.com
11 December 2019	Stadion Maksimir, Zagreb	(England) Manchester City	1–4	Olmo	UEFA.com

=== Rijeka ===
Date	Venue	Opponents	Score	Rijeka scorer(s)	Report
2019–20 Europa League - Third qualifying round
8 August 2019	Stadion Rujevica, Rijeka	(Scotland) Aberdeen	2–0	Čolak, Murić	UEFA.com
15 August 2019	Pittodrie Stadium, Aberdeen	(Scotland) Aberdeen	2–0	Lončar, Čolak	UEFA.com
2019–20 Europa League - Play-off round
22 August 2019	Ghelamco Arena, Ghent	(Belgium) KAA Gent	1–2	Halilović	UEFA.com
29 August 2019	Stadion Rujevica, Rijeka	(Belgium) KAA Gent	1–1	Puljić	UEFA.com

=== Osijek ===
Date	Venue	Opponents	Score	Osijek scorer(s)	Report
2019–20 Europa League - Second qualifying round
25 July 2019	Balgarska Armia Stadium, Sofia	(Bulgaria) CSKA Sofia	0–1		UEFA.com
1 August 2019	Stadion Gradski vrt, Osijek	(Bulgaria) CSKA Sofia	1–0 (3–4 p)	Majstorović	UEFA.com

=== Hajduk Split ===
Date	Venue	Opponents	Score	Hajduk Split scorer(s)	Report
2019–20 Europa League - First qualifying round
9 July 2019	Centenary Stadium, Ta' Qali	(Malta) Gżira United	2–0	Gyurcsó, Dolček	UEFA.com
18 July 2019	Stadion Poljud, Split	(Malta) Gżira United	1–3	Jradi	UEFA.com

=== ŽNK Split ===
Date	Venue	Opponents	Score	ŽNK Split scorer(s)	Report
2019–20 UEFA Women's Champions League - Qualifying round
7 August 2019	FC Metalist Training Ground, Vysokyi	(Ukraine) Zhytlobud-1 Kharkiv	2–3	Lubina, Pedić	UEFA.com
10 August 2019	FC Metalist Training Ground, Vysokyi	(Belarus) FC Minsk	1–2	Dujmović	UEFA.com
13 August 2019	FC Metalist Training Ground, Vysokyi	(Luxembourg) Bettembourg	7–2	Pedić (2), Dujmović (3), O'Neill, Valušek	UEFA.com

=== Dinamo Zagreb U19 ===
Date	Venue	Opponents	Score	Dinamo Zagreb U19 scorer(s)	Report
2019–20 UEFA Youth League - Group stage
18 September 2019	Stadion Hitrec-Kacian, Zagreb	(Italy) Atalanta	1–0	Karrica	UEFA.com
1 October 2019	Academy Stadium, Manchester	(England) Manchester City	2–2	Šipoš (2)	UEFA.com
22 October 2019	FC Metalist Training Ground, Vysokyi	(Ukraine) Shakhtar Donetsk	1–1	Janković	UEFA.com
6 November 2019	Stadion Hitrec-Kacian, Zagreb	(Ukraine) Shakhtar Donetsk	1–1	Krizmanić	UEFA.com
26 November 2019	Centro Sportivo Bortolotti, Bergamo	(Italy) Atalanta	0–2		UEFA.com
11 December 2019	Stadion Hitrec-Kacian, Zagreb	(England) Manchester City	1–0	Marin	UEFA.com
2019–20 UEFA Youth League - Play-offs
12 February 2020	Valeriy Lobanovskyi Dynamo Stadium, Kyiv	(Ukraine) Dynamo Kyiv	0–0 (4–3 p)		UEFA.com
2019–20 UEFA Youth League - Round of 16
4 March 2020	FC Bayern Campus, Munich	(Germany) Bayern Munich	2–2 (6–5 p)	Krizmanić, Karrica	UEFA.com
2019–20 UEFA Youth League - Quarter-finals
18 August 2020	Colovray Stadium, Nyon	(Portugal) Benfica	1–3	Karrica	UEFA.com
