= 2019–20 in French football =

Football in France
- Season: 2019–20

Men's football
- Ligue 1: Paris Saint-Germain
- Ligue 2: Lorient
- Championnat National: Not awarded
- Coupe de France: Paris Saint-Germain
- Coupe de la Ligue: Paris Saint-Germain
- Trophée des Champions: Paris Saint-Germain

Women's football
- Division 1: Lyon
- Coupe de France: Lyon
- Trophée des Championnes: Lyon

The following article is a summary of the 2019–20 football season in France, which was the 86th season of competitive football in the country and ran from July 2019 to June 2020.

On 28 April 2020, Prime Minister Edouard Philippe announced all sporting events in France would be cancelled due to the COVID-19 pandemic.

== National teams ==
=== France national football team ===
==== Friendlies ====
TBD	France	v	Ukraine	Saint-Denis, France
				Stadium: Stade de France

TBD	France	v	Finland	Décines-Charpieu, France
				Stadium: Stade de Lyon

TBD	France	v	Croatia	Nice, France
21:00 CEST (UTC+2)				Stadium: Allianz Riviera

==== UEFA Euro 2020 qualifying ====
===== Group H =====
Pos	Team	Pld	W	D	L	GF	GA	GD	Pts	Qualification	(France)	(Turkey)	(Iceland)	(Albania)	(Andorra)	(Moldova)
1	France	10	8	1	1	25	6	+19	25	Qualify for final tournament	—	1–1	4–0	4–1	3–0	2–1
2	Turkey	10	7	2	1	18	3	+15	23	Qualify for final tournament	2–0	—	0–0	1–0	1–0	4–0
3	Iceland	10	6	1	3	14	11	+3	19	Advance to play-offs via Nations League	0–1	2–1	—	1–0	2–0	3–0
4	Albania	10	4	1	5	16	14	+2	13		0–2	0–2	4–2	—	2–2	2–0
5	Andorra	10	1	1	8	3	20	−17	4		0–4	0–2	0–2	0–3	—	1–0
6	Moldova	10	1	0	9	4	26	−22	3		1–4	0–4	1–2	0–4	1–0	—

Source: UEFA
Rules for classification: Qualification tiebreakers

7 September 2019	France	4–1	Albania	Saint-Denis, France
20:45	Coman 8', 68'; Giroud 27'; Ikoné 85'	Report	Cikalleshi 90' (pen.)	Stadium: Stade de France; Attendance: 78,000; Referee: Jesús Gil Manzano (Spain)

10 September 2019	France	3–0	Andorra	Saint-Denis, France
20:45	Coman 18'; Lenglet 52'; Ben Yedder 90+1'	Report		Stadium: Stade de France; Attendance: 55,383; Referee: Mykola Balakin (Ukraine)

11 October 2019	Iceland	0–1	France	Reykjavík, Iceland
20:45 (21:45 UTC+3)		Report	Giroud 66' (pen.)	Stadium: Laugardalsvöllur; Attendance: 9,719; Referee: Gianluca Rocchi (Italy)

14 October 2019	France	1–1	Turkey	Saint-Denis, France
20:45	Giroud 76'	Report	Ayhan 81'	Stadium: Stade de France; Attendance: 72,154; Referee: Felix Brych (Germany)

14 November 2019	France	2–1	Moldova	Saint-Denis, France
20:45 (21:45 UTC+3)	Varane 35'; Giroud 79' (pen.)	Report	Rață 9'	Stadium: Stade de France; Referee: Gediminas Mažeika (Lithuania)

17 November 2019	Albania	0–2	France	Tirana, Albania
20:45		Report	Tolisso 9'; Griezmann 30'	Stadium: Arena Kombëtare; Referee: Slavko Vinčić (Slovenia)

=== France women's national football team ===
==== Friendly matches ====
31 August 2019	France	2–0	Spain	Clermont-Ferrand, France
21:00	Le Sommer 27'; Cascarino 76'	Report		Stadium: Stade Gabriel Montpied; Attendance: 7,508; Referee: Rebecca Welch (England)

4 October 2019	France	4–0	Iceland	Nîmes, France
21:00	Le Sommer 4', 17'; Cascarino 66'; Majri 85'	Report		Stadium: Stade des Costières; Attendance: 11,384; Referee: Eleni Antoniou (Greece)

==== 2020 Tournoi de France ====
Pos	Team	Pld	W	D	L	GF	GA	GD	Pts
1	France (H, C)	3	2	1	0	5	3	+2	7
2	Netherlands	3	0	3	0	3	3	0	3
3	Canada	3	0	2	1	2	3	−1	2
4	Brazil	3	0	2	1	2	3	−1	2

Updated to match(es) played on compete. Source: FFF
Rules for classification: 1) points; 2) goal difference; 3) goals scored; 4) head-to-head result; 5) FIFA ranking.
(C) Champions; (H) Hosts

4 March 2020	France	1–0	Canada	Calais, France
17:00	Asseyi 54'	Report		Stadium: Stade de l'Epopee; Attendance: 7,054; Referee: Stade de l'Épopée, Calais

7 March 2020	France	1–0	Brazil	Valenciennes, France
21:00	Gauvin 55'			Stadium: Stade du Hainaut; Attendance: 17,022; Referee: Marta Huerta de Aza (Spain)

10 March 2020	France	3–3	Netherlands	Valenciennes, France
21:00	Gauvin 45'; Mbock Bathy 59' (pen.); Sarr 90+4'	Report	Wilms 29'; Spitse 33' (pen.); Martens 73'	Stadium: Stade du Hainaut; Attendance: 0 Referee: Anastasia Pustovoitova (Russia)
Note: The match between France and Netherlands in Valenciennes was played behind closed doors due to an outbreak of coronavirus in France.

==== UEFA Women's Euro 2021 qualifying ====
===== Group G =====
Pos	Team	Pld	W	D	L	GF	GA	GD	Pts	Qualification	France	Austria	Serbia	North Macedonia	Kazakhstan
1	France	8	7	1	0	44	0	+44	22	Final tournament	—	3–0	6–0	11–0	12–0
2	Austria	8	6	1	1	22	3	+19	19	Final tournament	0–0	—	1–0	3–0	9–0
3	Serbia	8	4	0	4	21	12	+9	12		0–2	0–1	—	8–1	4–1
4	North Macedonia	8	2	0	6	8	39	−31	6		0–7	0–3	0–6	—	4–1
5	Kazakhstan	8	0	0	8	2	43	−41	0		0–3	0–5	0–3	0–3	—

Source: UEFA
Rules for classification: Tiebreakers

8 October 2019	Kazakhstan	0–3	France	Shymkent, Kazakhstan
17:00		Report	Gauvin 58'; Le Sommer 70'; Katoto 89'	Stadium: Kazhymukan Munaitpasov Stadium; Referee: Laura Rapp (Sweden)

9 November 2019	France	6–0	Serbia	Bordeaux, France
21:00	Majri 7', 12', 63'; Geyoro 31'; Katoto 52'; Asseyi 90+3'	Report		Stadium: Matmut Atlantique; Attendance: 21,211; Referee: Marta Huerta De Aza (Spain)

== UEFA competitions ==
=== UEFA Champions League ===
==== Group stage ====
===== Group A =====
Pos	Team	Pld	W	D	L	GF	GA	GD	Pts	Qualification	PAR	RMA	BRU	GAL
1	(France) Paris Saint-Germain	6	5	1	0	17	2	+15	16	Advance to knockout phase	—	3–0	1–0	5–0
2	(Spain) Real Madrid	6	3	2	1	14	8	+6	11	Advance to knockout phase	2–2	—	2–2	6–0
3	(Belgium) Club Brugge	6	0	3	3	4	12	−8	3	Transfer to Europa League	0–5	1–3	—	0–0
4	(Turkey) Galatasaray	6	0	2	4	1	14	−13	2		0–1	0–1	1–1	—

Source: UEFA

===== Group G =====
Pos	Team	Pld	W	D	L	GF	GA	GD	Pts	Qualification	RBL	LYO	BEN	ZEN
1	(Germany) RB Leipzig	6	3	2	1	10	8	+2	11	Advance to knockout phase	—	0–2	2–2	2–1
2	(France) Lyon	6	2	2	2	9	8	+1	8	Advance to knockout phase	2–2	—	3–1	1–1
3	(Portugal) Benfica	6	2	1	3	10	11	−1	7 (Note: Tied on head-to-head points (3). Head-to-head goal difference: Benfica +1, Zenit Saint Petersburg −1.)	Transfer to Europa League	1–2	2–1	—	3–0
4	(Russia) Zenit Saint Petersburg	6	2	1	3	7	9	−2	7		0–2	2–0	3–1	—

Source: UEFA

===== Group H =====
Pos	Team	Pld	W	D	L	GF	GA	GD	Pts	Qualification	VAL	CHE	AJX	LIL
1	(Spain) Valencia	6	3	2	1	9	7	+2	11 (Note: Head-to-head points: Valencia 4, Chelsea 1.)	Advance to knockout phase	—	2–2	0–3	4–1
2	(England) Chelsea	6	3	2	1	11	9	+2	11	Advance to knockout phase	0–1	—	4–4	2–1
3	(Netherlands) Ajax	6	3	1	2	12	6	+6	10	Transfer to Europa League	0–1	0–1	—	3–0
4	(France) Lille	6	0	1	5	4	14	−10	1		1–1	1–2	0–2	—

Source: UEFA

==== Knockout phase ====
===== Round of 16 =====
Team 1	Agg.	Team 2	1st leg	2nd leg
Borussia Dortmund (Germany)	2–3	(France) Paris Saint-Germain	2–1	0–2
Lyon (France)	2–2 (a)	(Italy) Juventus	1–0	1–2

===== Quarter-finals =====
Team 1	Score	Team 2
Manchester City (England)	1–3	(France) Lyon
Atalanta (Italy)	1–2	(France) Paris Saint-Germain

===== Semi-finals =====
Team 1	Score	Team 2
Lyon (France)	0–3	(Germany) Bayern Munich
RB Leipzig (Germany)	0–3	(France) Paris Saint-Germain

===== Final =====
The "home" team (for administrative purposes) was determined by an additional draw held on 10 July 2020 (after the quarter-final and semi-final draws), at the UEFA headquarters in Nyon, Switzerland.

23 August 2020
20:00 UTC+1

Paris Saint-Germain (France)	0–1	(Germany) Bayern Munich
	Report	Coman 59'

Estádio da Luz, Lisbon
Attendance: 0 (Note: The remainder of the competition, held in August 2020, was played behind closed doors due to the COVID-19 pandemic in Europe.)
Referee: Daniele Orsato (Italy)

=== UEFA Europa League ===
==== Second qualifying round ====
Team 1	Agg.	Team 2	1st leg	2nd leg
Strasbourg (France)	4–3	(Israel) Maccabi Haifa	3–1	1–2

==== Third qualifying round ====
Team 1	Agg.	Team 2	1st leg	2nd leg
Lokomotiv Plovdiv (Bulgaria)	0–2	(France) Strasbourg	0–1	0–1

==== Play-off round ====
Team 1	Agg.	Team 2	1st leg	2nd leg
Strasbourg (France)	1–3	(Germany) Eintracht Frankfurt	1–0	0–3

==== Group stage ====
===== Group E =====
Pos	Team	Pld	W	D	L	GF	GA	GD	Pts	Qualification	CEL	CLJ	LAZ	REN
1	(Scotland) Celtic	6	4	1	1	10	6	+4	13	Advance to knockout phase	—	2–0	2–1	3–1
2	(Romania) CFR Cluj	6	4	0	2	6	4	+2	12	Advance to knockout phase	2–0	—	2–1	1–0
3	(Italy) Lazio	6	2	0	4	6	9	−3	6		1–2	1–0	—	2–1
4	(France) Rennes	6	1	1	4	5	8	−3	4		1–1	0–1	2–0	—

Source: UEFA

===== Group I =====
Pos	Team	Pld	W	D	L	GF	GA	GD	Pts	Qualification	GNT	WLF	STE	OLE
1	(Belgium) Gent	6	3	3	0	11	7	+4	12	Advance to knockout phase	—	2–2	3–2	2–1
2	(Germany) VfL Wolfsburg	6	3	2	1	9	7	+2	11	Advance to knockout phase	1–3	—	1–0	3–1
3	(France) Saint-Étienne	6	0	4	2	6	8	−2	4		0–0	1–1	—	1–1
4	(Ukraine) Oleksandriya	6	0	3	3	6	10	−4	3		1–1	0–1	2–2	—

Source: UEFA

=== UEFA Youth League ===
==== UEFA Champions League Path ====
===== Group A =====
Pos	Team	Pld	W	D	L	GF	GA	GD	Pts	Qualification	RMA	BRU	PAR	GAL
1	(Spain) Real Madrid	6	4	1	1	16	10	+6	13	Round of 16	—	3–0	6–3	2–4
2	(Belgium) Club Brugge	6	3	1	2	12	9	+3	10	Play-offs	2–2	—	2–0	3–2
3	(France) Paris Saint-Germain	6	2	0	4	10	15	−5	6 (Note: Ranked on head-to-head points: Paris Saint-Germain 6, Galatasaray 0.)		1–2	0–4	—	1–0
4	(Turkey) Galatasaray	6	2	0	4	9	13	−4	6		0–1	2–1	1–5	—

Source: UEFA

===== Group G =====
Pos	Team	Pld	W	D	L	GF	GA	GD	Pts	Qualification	BEN	LYO	RBL	ZEN
1	(Portugal) Benfica	6	5	0	1	17	6	+11	15	Round of 16	—	1–2	2–1	1–0
2	(France) Lyon	6	4	0	2	13	10	+3	12	Play-offs	2–3	—	1–0	4–2
3	(Germany) RB Leipzig	6	1	1	4	5	10	−5	4 (Note: Ranked on head-to-head points: RB Leipzig 4, Zenit Saint Petersburg 1.)		0–3	1–3	—	1–1
4	(Russia) Zenit Saint Petersburg	6	1	1	4	7	16	−9	4		1–7	3–1	0–2	—

Source: UEFA

===== Group H =====
Pos	Team	Pld	W	D	L	GF	GA	GD	Pts	Qualification	AJX	LIL	CHE	VAL
1	(Netherlands) Ajax	6	3	2	1	13	7	+6	11	Round of 16	—	4–0	0–1	1–1
2	(France) Lille	6	3	1	2	7	8	−1	10	Play-offs	1–2	—	2–0	1–0
3	(England) Chelsea	6	1	3	2	7	9	−2	6		1–1	1–1	—	3–3
4	(Spain) Valencia	6	1	2	3	10	13	−3	5		3–5	1–2	2–1	—

Source: UEFA

==== Domestic Champions Path ====
===== First round =====
Team 1	Agg.	Team 2	1st leg	2nd leg
Rennes (France)	2–1	(Serbia) Brodarac	2–1	0–0

===== Second round =====
Team 1	Agg.	Team 2	1st leg	2nd leg
Rennes (France)	3–0	(Israel) Maccabi Petah Tikva	2–0	1–0

==== Play-offs ====
Team 1	Score	Team 2
Zaragoza (Spain)	1–3	(France) Lyon
Midtjylland (Denmark)	1–1 (7–6 p)	(France) Lille
Rennes (France)	1–1 (5–3 p)	(Belgium) Club Brugge

==== Knockout phase ====
===== Round of 16 =====
Team 1	Score	Team 2
Atalanta (Italy)	3–3 (3–5 p)	(France) Lyon
Internazionale (Italy)	1–0 (Note: On 9 March 2020, Internazionale announced that they had suspended all activities of their youth teams due to the COVID-19 pandemic in Italy, and thus would not play their round of 16 match against Rennes, and the match had originally been cancelled. UEFA decided not to punish Internazionale due to the unprecedented situation caused by COVID-19 and following an agreement by both clubs, the match was rescheduled.)	(France) Rennes

===== Quarter-finals =====
Team 1	Score	Team 2
Red Bull Salzburg (Austria)	4–3	(France) Lyon

=== UEFA Women's Champions League ===
==== Knockout phase ====
===== Round of 32 =====
Team 1	Agg.	Team 2	1st leg	2nd leg
Braga (Portugal)	0–7	(France) Paris Saint-Germain	0–7	0–0
Ryazan-VDV (Russia)	0–16	(France) Lyon	0–9	0–7

===== Round of 16 =====
Team 1	Agg.	Team 2	1st leg	2nd leg
Fortuna Hjørring (Denmark)	0–11 (Note: Order of legs reversed after original draw.)	(France) Lyon	0–4	0–7
Breiðablik (Iceland)	1–7	(France) Paris Saint-Germain	0–4	1–3

===== Quarter-finals =====
Team 1	Score	Team 2
Lyon (France)	2–1	(Germany) Bayern Munich
Arsenal (England)	1–2	(France) Paris Saint-Germain

===== Semi-finals =====
Team 1	Score	Team 2
Paris Saint-Germain (France)	0–1	(France) Lyon

===== Final =====
30 August 2020
20:00 UTC+2

VfL Wolfsburg (Germany)	1–3	(France) Lyon
Popp 58'	Report	Le Sommer 25'; Kumagai 44'; Gunnarsdóttir 88'

Anoeta, San Sebastián
Attendance: 0 (Note: The remainder of the competition, held in August 2020, was played behind closed doors due to the COVID-19 pandemic in Europe.)
Referee: Esther Staubli (Switzerland)

== League tables ==
=== Men ===
==== Ligue 1 ====
Pos	Team	Pld	W	D	L	GF	GA	GD	Pts	PPG	Qualification or relegation
1	Paris Saint-Germain (C)	27	22	2	3	75	24	+51	68	2.52	Qualification for the Champions League group stage
2	Marseille	28	16	8	4	41	29	+12	56	2.00	Qualification for the Champions League group stage
3	Rennes	28	15	5	8	38	24	+14	50	1.79	Qualification for the Champions League group stage
4	Lille	28	15	4	9	35	27	+8	49	1.75	Qualification for the Europa League group stage (Note: Since the winners of the Coupe de France and the Coupe de la Ligue, Paris Saint-Germain, qualified for the Champions League, the spot given to the Coupe de France winners (Europa League group stage) was passed to the fifth-placed team and the spot given to the Coupe de la Ligue winners (Europa League second qualifying round) was passed to the sixth-placed team.)
5	Nice	28	11	8	9	41	38	+3	41 (Note: Nice finished ahead of Reims on head-to-head points: Nice 2–0 Reims, Reims 1–1 Nice.)	1.46	Qualification for the Europa League group stage
6	Reims	28	10	11	7	26	21	+5	41	1.46	Qualification for the Europa League second qualifying round
7	Lyon	28	11	7	10	42	27	+15	40	1.43	
8	Montpellier	28	11	7	10	35	34	+1	40	1.43	
9	Monaco	28	11	7	10	44	44	0	40	1.43	
10	Strasbourg	27	11	5	11	32	32	0	38	1.41	
11	Angers	28	11	6	11	28	33	−5	39	1.39	
12	Bordeaux	28	9	10	9	40	34	+6	37 (Note: Bordeaux finished ahead of Nantes on head-to-head points: Bordeaux 2–0 Nantes, Nantes 0–1 Bordeaux.)	1.32	
13	Nantes	28	11	4	13	28	31	−3	37	1.32	
14	Brest	28	8	10	10	34	37	−3	34	1.21	
15	Metz	28	8	10	10	27	35	−8	34	1.21	
16	Dijon	28	7	9	12	27	37	−10	30	1.07	
17	Saint-Étienne	28	8	6	14	29	45	−16	30	1.07	
18	Nîmes (Note: Originally, the 18th-placed Ligue 1 team would play in promotion-relegation play-offs at the end of the season with a team from Ligue 2 to decide whether they would remain in Ligue 1 for the 2020–21 season, but the play-offs were cancelled and the 18th-placed team remained in Ligue 1.)	28	7	6	15	29	44	−15	27	0.96	
19	Amiens (R)	28	4	11	13	31	50	−19	23	0.82	Relegation to Ligue 2
20	Toulouse (R)	28	3	4	21	22	58	−36	13	0.46	Relegation to Ligue 2

Source: Ligue 1
Rules for classification: 1) Points per game; 2) Head-to-head points; 3) Head-to-head goal difference; 4) Goal difference; 5) Goals scored; 6) Fairplay ranking.
(C) Champions; (R) Relegated

==== Ligue 2 ====
Pos	Team	Pld	W	D	L	GF	GA	GD	Pts	Promotion or Relegation
1	Lorient (C, P)	28	17	3	8	45	25	+20	54	Promotion to Ligue 1
2	Lens (P)	28	15	8	5	39	24	+15	53	Promotion to Ligue 1
3	Ajaccio	28	15	7	6	38	22	+16	52	
4	Troyes	28	16	3	9	34	25	+9	51	
5	Clermont	28	14	8	6	35	25	+10	50	
6	Le Havre	28	11	11	6	38	25	+13	44	
7	Valenciennes	28	11	9	8	24	20	+4	42	
8	Guingamp	28	10	9	9	40	33	+7	39	
9	Grenoble	28	7	14	7	27	29	−2	35	
10	Chambly	28	9	8	11	26	32	−6	35	
11	Auxerre	28	8	10	10	31	30	+1	34	
12	Nancy	28	6	16	6	27	26	+1	34	
13	Caen	28	8	10	10	33	34	−1	34	
14	Sochaux	28	8	10	10	28	30	−2	34	
15	Châteauroux	28	9	7	12	22	38	−16	34	
16	Rodez	28	8	8	12	31	34	−3	32	
17	Paris FC	28	7	7	14	22	40	−18	28	
18	Niort (Note: Originally, the 18th-placed Ligue 2 team would play in promotion-relegation play-offs at the end of the season with a team from the Championnat National to decide whether they would remain in Ligue 2 for the 2020–21 season, but the play-offs were cancelled and the 18th- placed team remained in Ligue 2.)	28	6	8	14	30	41	−11	26	
19	Le Mans (R)	28	7	5	16	30	45	−15	26	Relegation to Championnat National
20	Orléans (R)	28	4	7	17	21	43	−22	19	Relegation to Championnat National

Source: Ligue 2
Rules for classification: 1) Points; 2) Goal difference; 3) Number of goals scored; 4) Head-to-head goal difference; 5) Fair play points
(C) Champions; (P) Promoted; (R) Relegated

==== Championnat National ====
Pos	Team	Pld	W	D	L	GF	GA	GD	PPG	Promotion or Relegation
1	Pau (P)	25	13	9	3	43	20	+23	1.92	Promotion to Ligue 2
2	Dunkerque (P)	25	14	5	6	42	26	+16	1.88	Promotion to Ligue 2
3	Boulogne (Note: Originally, the 3rd-placed Championnat National team would play in promotion-relegation play-offs at the end of the season with a team from Ligue 2 to decide whether they would be promoted to Ligue 2 for the 2020–21 season, but the play-offs were cancelled and the 3rd-placed team remained in the Championnat National.)	25	14	4	7	32	17	+15	1.84	
4	Avranches	24	13	3	8	30	26	+4	1.75	
5	Red Star	25	12	6	7	30	22	+8	1.68 (Note: Red Star and Bourg-Péronnas completed both their head-to-head games (Bourg-Péronnas 1–4 Red Star, Red Star 1–1 Bourg-Péronnas). Criteria 2 (Number of points gained in head-to-head matches (only where all scheduled matches between all tied teams have completed)) applies: Red Star 4, Bourg-Péronnas 1.)	
6	Bourg-Péronnas	25	11	9	5	38	30	+8	1.68	
7	Villefranche	25	10	11	4	34	24	+10	1.64	
8	Lyon-Duchère	25	11	7	7	37	32	+5	1.60	
9	Créteil	25	9	8	8	33	27	+6	1.40 (Note: Créteil and Laval did not complete both their head-to-head games. Both completed 12 of 17 away games. Criteria 5 (Goal difference per game completed) applies: Créteil 0.24, Laval 0.08.)	
10	Laval	25	9	8	8	26	24	+2	1.40	
11	Concarneau	25	8	7	10	21	25	−4	1.24	
12	Cholet	25	7	7	11	32	40	−8	1.12	
13	Bastia-Borgo	23	5	9	9	22	32	−10	1.04	
14	Quevilly-Rouen	24	6	6	12	26	34	−8	1.00	
15	Le Puy (R)	25	6	5	14	27	40	−13	0.92 (Note: Le Puy and Béziers did not complete both their head-to-head games. Both completed 13 of 17 away games. Criteria 5 (Goal difference per game completed) applies: Le Puy -0.52, Béziers -0.68.)	Relegation to Championnat National 2
16	Béziers (R)	25	5	8	12	26	43	−17	0.92	Relegation to Championnat National 2
17	Gazélec Ajaccio (Note: On 2 August 2019, Gazélec Ajaccio refused to play their first game of the season at Red Star in protest at decisions taken by the DNCG. On 7 August 2019, the FFF confirmed the forfeit, awarding a 3–0 victory to Red Star and deducting a penalty point from Gazélec Ajaccio.) (R)	25	4	8	13	15	35	−20	0.76	Relegation to Championnat National 2
18	Toulon (R)	25	1	10	14	17	34	−17	0.52	Relegation to Championnat National 2

Source: FFF.fr
Rules for classification: see Special rule changes section
(P) Promoted; (R) Relegated

==== Championnat National 2 ====
Group A
Pos	Team	Pld	PPG
1	SC Bastia (P)	21	2.52
2	Sedan (P)	21	2.29
3	Bobigny	21	2.14
4	Reims (res)	21	1.71
5	Sainte-Geneviève	21	1.62
6	Épinal	21	1.43
7	Lens (res)	21	1.33
8	Saint-Maur	21	1.14
9	Haguenau	21	1.10
10	Saint-Quentin	21	1.10
11	Schiltigheim	21	1.05
12	Mulhouse (R)	21	0.95
13	Belfort	21	0.90
14	Lille (res) (R)	21	0.86
15	Drancy (R)	21	0.81
16	Croix (R)	21	0.76

Source: foot-national.com
(P) Promoted;
(R) Relegated

Group B
Pos	Team	Pld	PPG
1	Saint-Brieuc (P)	21	2.19
2	Chartres	21	2.10
3	Rouen	20	1.95
4	Granville	21	1.81
5	Vannes	21	1.67
6	Gobelins	21	1.43
7	Lorient (res)	21	1.43
8	Fleury	21	1.38
9	Saint-Malo	20	1.40
10	Angers (res)	21	1.29
11	Guingamp (res)	21	1.10
12	L'Entente SSG	21	1.10
13	Poissy	21	1.05
14	Vitré (R)	21	0.86
15	Oissel (R)	21	0.62
16	Mantes (R)	21	0.24

Source: foot-national.com
(P) Promoted;
(R) Relegated

Group C
Pos	Team	Pld	PPG
1	Sète (P)	21	2.33
2	Blois	20	1.90
3	Bergerac	21	1.71
4	Les Herbiers	20	1.75
5	Colomiers	20	1.55
6	Saint-Pryvé	21	1.48
7	Bourges Foot	21	1.48
8	Nantes (res)	21	1.33
9	Angoulême	20	1.35
10	Romorantin	21	1.19
11	Andrézieux	21	1.10
12	Trélissac	21	1.05
13	Chamalières	20	1.05
14	Montpellier (res) (R)	21	1.00
15	Saint-Étienne (res) (R)	21	0.86
16	Stade Bordelais (R)	20	0.45

Source: foot-national.com
(P) Promoted;
(R) Relegated

Group D
Pos	Team	Pld	PPG
1	Annecy (P)	21	2.00
2	Grasse	21	1.90
3	MDA Foot	21	1.86
4	Moulins Yzeure	21	1.86
5	Martigues	21	1.76
6	Louhans-Cuiseaux	21	1.71
7	Fréjus Saint-Raphaël	21	1.29
8	Lyon (res)	21	1.19
9	Hyères	21	1.19
10	Olympic Marseille (res)	21	1.14
11	Jura Sud	21	1.10
12	Marignane Gignac	21	1.05
13	Monaco (res)	21	1.05
14	Saint-Priest	21	1.00
15	Endoume Marseille (R)	21	0.90
16	Nîmes (res) (R)	21	0.62

Source: foot-national.com
(P) Promoted;
(R) Relegated

=== Women ===
==== Division 1 Féminine ====
Pos	Team	Pld	W	D	L	GF	GA	GD	Pts	Qualification or relegation
1	Lyon (C)	16	14	2	0	67	4	+63	44	Qualification for the Champions League Round of 32
2	Paris Saint-Germain	16	13	2	1	60	7	+53	41	Qualification for the Champions League Round of 32
3	Bordeaux	16	12	1	3	36	12	+24	37	
4	Montpellier	16	9	3	4	39	18	+21	30	
5	Paris FC	16	7	3	6	21	26	−5	24	
6	Guingamp	16	6	5	5	20	21	−1	23	
7	Fleury	16	6	2	8	18	30	−12	20	
8	Reims	16	4	3	9	13	32	−19	15	
9	Dijon	16	3	5	8	10	32	−22	14	
10	Soyaux	16	4	4	8	15	30	−15	13 (Note: 3 points deduction (sanctioned by DNCG).)	
11	Marseille (R)	16	2	0	14	12	62	−50	6	Relegation to Division 2 Féminine
12	Metz (R)	16	0	2	14	7	44	−37	2	Relegation to Division 2 Féminine

Rules for classification: 1) points; 2) head-to-head points; 3) head-to-head goal difference; 4) goal difference; 5) goals scored
(C) Champions; (R) Relegated

== Cup competitions ==
=== 2019–20 Coupe de France ===
==== Final ====
24 July 2020
21:10 CEST

Paris Saint-Germain	1–0	Saint-Étienne
Neymar 14'

Stade de France, Saint-Denis
Attendance: 2,805 (Note: The final was played in front of 2,805 spectators due to the COVID-19 pandemic in France.)
Referee: Amaury Delerue

=== 2019–20 Coupe de la Ligue ===
==== Final ====
31 July 2020
21:10 CEST

Paris Saint-Germain	0–0 (a.e.t.)	Lyon
	Report
Penalties
Di María (penalty scored); Verratti (penalty scored); Paredes (penalty scored); Herrera (penalty scored); Neymar (penalty scored); Sarabia (penalty scored)	6–5	(penalty scored) Andersen; (penalty scored) Toko Ekambi; (penalty scored) Caqueret; (penalty scored) Mendes; (penalty scored) Aouar; (penalty missed) Traoré

Stade de France, Saint-Denis
Attendance: 3,500 (Note: The final was played in front of 3,500 spectators due to the COVID-19 pandemic in France.)
Referee: Jérôme Brisard

=== 2019 Trophée des Champions ===
3 August 2019
19:30 CST

Paris Saint-Germain	2–1	Rennes
Mbappé 57'; Di María 73'	Report	Hunou 13'

Shenzhen Universiade Sports Centre, Shenzhen
Attendance: 22,045
Referee: Benoît Bastien
