= Portuguese in Croatia =

Croatian Portuguese
Luso-croatas (Portuguese) Portugalci u Hrvatskoj (Croatian)
- (Croatia) (Portugal)
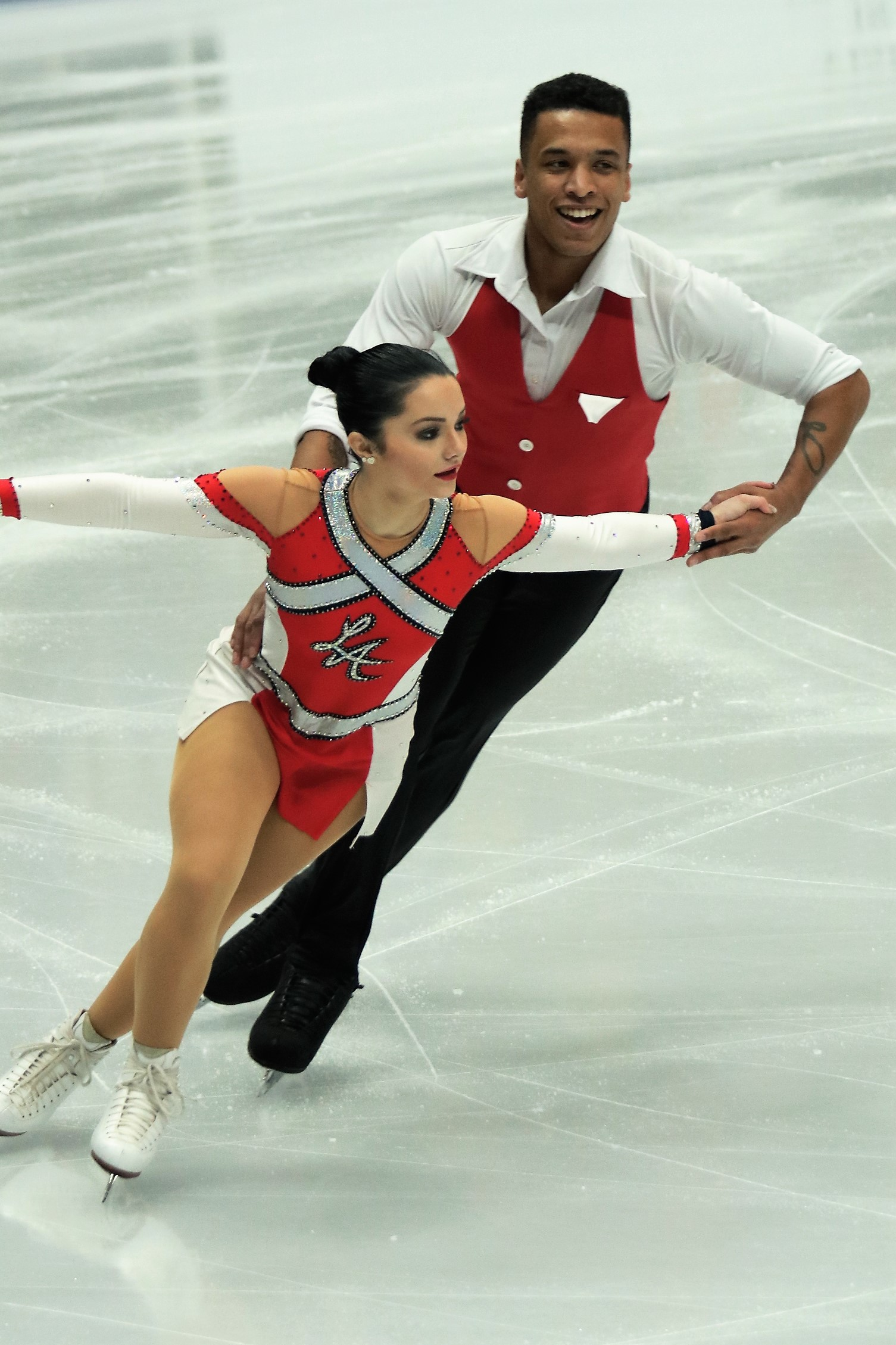
- Competitive figure skater Antonio Souza-Kordeiru, possibly the best known Croatian of Portuguese heritage

Total population
- 188

Languages
- Croatian, Portuguese

Religion
- Predominantly Christianity (Roman Catholicism), Irreligion

Related ethnic groups
- Other Portuguese people, Portuguese in Bosnia and Herzegovina, Portuguese in North Macedonia, Portuguese in Slovenia

Portuguese in Croatia (Croatian: Portugalci u Hrvatskoj) are citizens and residents of Croatia who are of Portuguese descent.

Portuguese in Croatia (also known as Portuguese Croatians/ Croatian-Portuguese Community or, in Portuguese, known as Portugueses na Croácia / Comunidade portuguesa na Croácia / Luso-croatas) are the citizens or residents of Croatia whose ethnic origins lie in Portugal.

Portuguese Croatians are Portuguese-born citizens with a Croatian citizenship or Croatian-born citizens of Portuguese ancestry or citizenship.

According to official Portuguese estimates, there were 188 Portuguese people residing in Croatia in 2021. Moreover, 4 Portuguese have acquired Croatian citizenship since 2008. The Portuguese constitute approximately 0.005% of the country's population.

== History ==
The history of the Portuguese community in Croatia is very recent, since Portuguese-Yugoslavian interactions were limited. Both countries are EU as well as NATO members. Since 2023, they also share a common currency. Portugal has fully supported Croatia's bids to join the EU and NATO.

The first significant influx of Portuguese to Croatia was recorded in the 1990s, because of NATO operations in the country amidst the Yugoslav wars. They were mostly soldiers, charity workers and physicians.

The Portuguese community in Croatia is relatively small compared to other immigrant communities in the country. Many Portuguese individuals moved to Croatia for work or study opportunities, particularly in fields like tourism, language teaching, and business. Croatia is quite popular amongst Erasmus+ students as well.

The Portuguese community in Croatia has grown steadily over the years, in particular since Croatia's accession to the EU in 2013, but it still represents a relatively small percentage of the total foreign population in the country.

== Footballers ==
In recent years some Portuguese international footballers have moved to Croatia in order to play for Croatian clubs. For instance, in 2023 footballers Danilo Veiga (Rijeka), Ferro (Hajduk Split), Miguel Campos (Rudeš), Rafa Pereira (Varaždin) and Leandro Gerson Da Silva E Costa (NK Nedelišće) were playing in the country.

== Remittances ==
The two countries enjoy friendly relationships and mutual trust, witnessing increasing trade as well. The Portuguese community in Croatia retains strong ties with its homeland and, between 2000 and 2021, it has sent approximately 1.4 million euros (€) to Portugal in remittances. In the same timeframe, Croatians in Portugal (numbering around 500 individuals) have sent approximately 16.44 million euros (€) to Croatia.

== Portuguese language ==
The Portuguese language is not widely spoken in Croatia, as Croatian is the official and predominant language of the country. English, German, and Italian are among the most commonly spoken foreign languages, especially in tourist areas. Despite the scarce presence of the Portuguese language in the country, Portugal and Croatia have signed an agreement in 1998 in order to promote and enhance cultural cooperation. The agreement was renewed in 2018. In general, there is interest towards Portuguese culture and products (such as Porco Alentejano meat), especially because seen as more exotic than the primary choices such as English, German, Romance or fellow Slavic languages.

In fact, due to an increasing interest in Portuguese language learning globally and in Croatia as well, some educational institutions and language centers in Croatia offer Portuguese language courses for students and individuals interested in acquiring language skills for travel, work, or cultural reasons. These courses are more common in major cities and tourist destinations where the demand for foreign language education is higher.

As of today, the Portuguese are part of a wider Portuguese-speaking community in Croatia, comprising around 10 people from PALOP countries (the majority being from Angola), Timor-Leste or Macau and around 265 Brazilians. Moreover, around 700 Brazilians have acquired Croatian nationality. People from CPLP countries thus number around 1,160 people, accounting for 0.03% of the population of Croatia.

== Notable people ==
- Antonio Souza-Kordeiru (1993): Russian-Croatian former pair skater. Skating with Lana Petranović for Croatia, he has competed in the final segment at four European Championships
- Nikola Tavares (1999): footballer and former Croatia youth international

== See also ==
- Croatia-Portugal relations
- Portuguese in Slovenia
