= Rafael Pereira =

Rafael Pereira may refer to:

- Rafael Pereira (footballer, born 1984), Brazilian football centre-back
- Rafael Pereira (hurdler) (born 1997), Brazilian hurdler
- Rafa Pereira (born 2001), Portuguese football midfielder

== See also ==
- Rafael Carioca (born 1989), full name Rafael de Souza Pereira, Brazilian football defensive midfielder
