= Portuguese in Slovenia =

Slovenian Portuguese
Luso-eslovenos (Portuguese) Portugalci v Sloveniji (Slovene)
- (Slovenia) (Portugal)
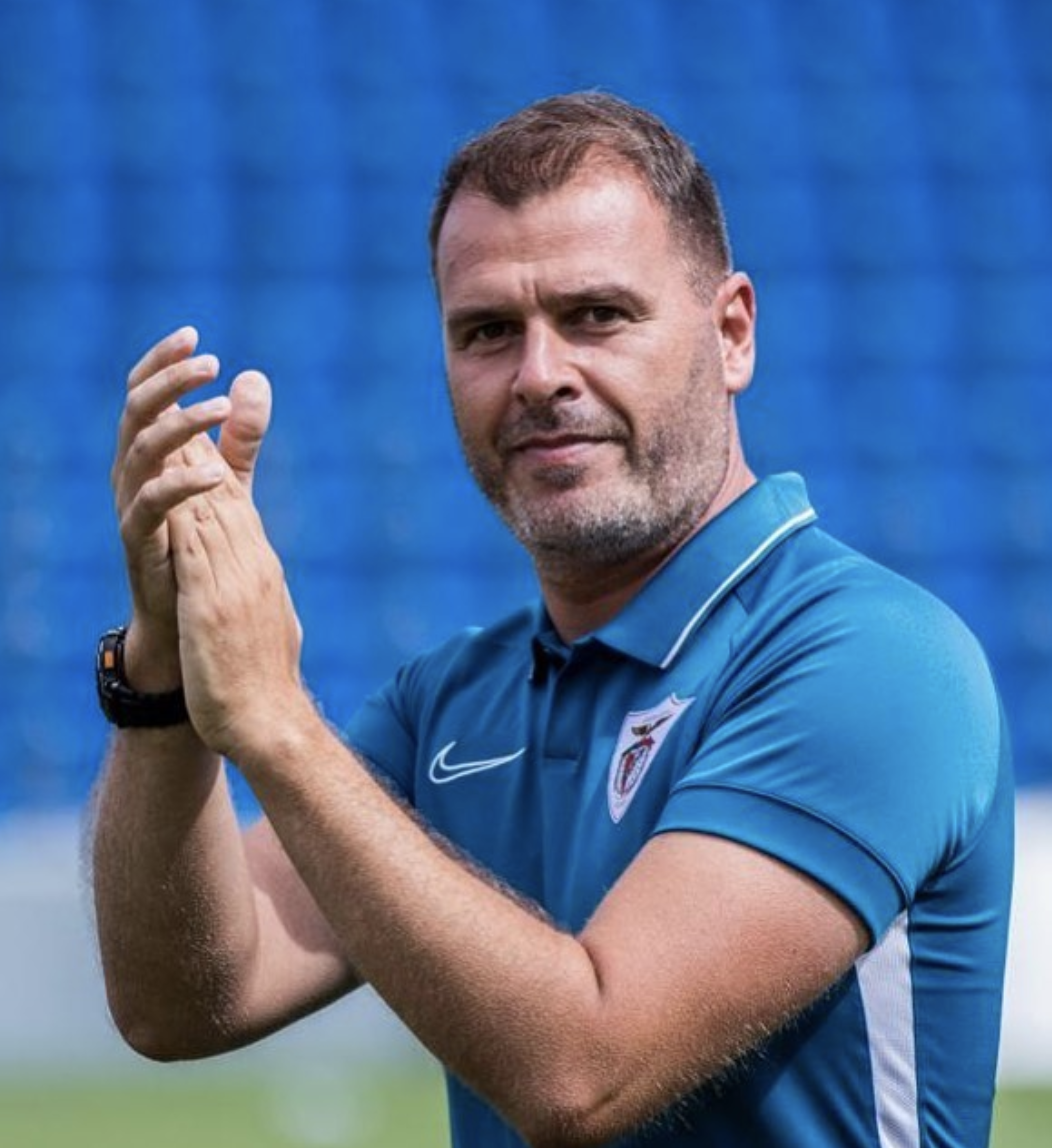
- Football manager João Henriques, possibly the best known Portuguese expatriate in Slovenia

Total population
- 86

Languages
- Slovene, Portuguese

Religion
- Predominantly Christianity (Roman Catholicism), Irreligion

Related ethnic groups
- Other Portuguese people, Portuguese in Bosnia and Herzegovina, Portuguese in Croatia, Portuguese in Montenegro, Portuguese in North Macedonia, Portuguese in Serbia

Portuguese in Slovenia (Slovene: Portugalci v Sloveniji) are citizens and residents of Slovenia who are of Portuguese descent.

Portuguese in Slovenia (also known as Portuguese Slovenes/ Slovenian-Portuguese Community or, in Portuguese, known as Portugueses na Eslovénia / Comunidade portuguesa na Eslovénia / Luso-eslovenos) are the citizens or residents of Slovenia whose ethnic origins lie in Portugal.

Portuguese Slovenes are Portuguese-born citizens with a Slovenian citizenship or Slovenian-born citizens of Portuguese ancestry or citizenship.

According to official Portuguese estimates, there were 86 Portuguese-born people residing in Slovenia in 2022. The Portuguese constitute approximately 0.004% of the country's population.

== History ==
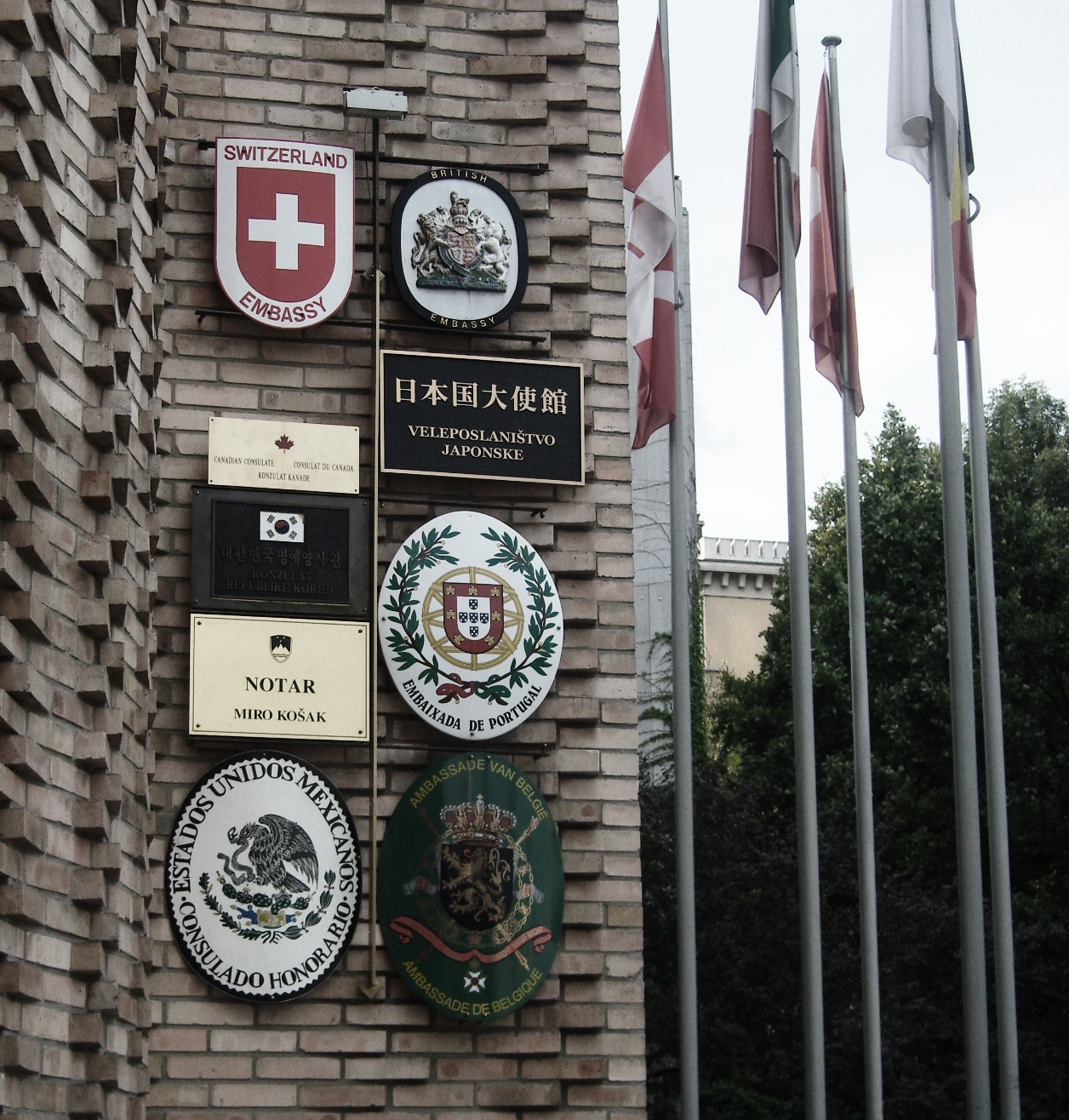
Portuguese embassy in Ljubljana

The history of the Portuguese community in Slovenia is very recent, since Portuguese-Yugoslavian interactions were limited. Both countries are EU as well as NATO members. Since 2007, they also share a common currency.

The Portuguese community in Slovenia is relatively small compared to other immigrant communities in the country. Many Portuguese individuals moved to Slovenia for work or study opportunities, particularly in fields like tourism, language teaching, and business. Slovenia is quite popular amongst Erasmus+ students as well: in 2021 alone around 500 Portuguese nationals chose to study or carry out research in Slovenia under the Erasmus+ agreement (Higher education, Adult education, youth mobility, staff mobility).

The Portuguese community in Slovenia has grown steadily over the years (almost 200 Portuguese have entered the country since 2008) but it still represents a relatively small percentage of the total foreign population in the country.

Despite being small, the Portuguese community is very united and has created an intercultural Portuguese-Slovenian magazine called "Sardinha" (Portuguese for sardine). Portuguese are very well integrated into Slovenian society, and many of those living in Slovenia permanently live in mixed Luso-Slovenian couples. They are generally highly educated.

== Footballers ==
In recent years some Portuguese international footballers have moved to Slovenia in order to play for Slovenian clubs. For instance, in 2023 footballers Rui Pedro (Olimpija Ljubljana), David Sualehe (Olimpija Ljubljana), Jorge Silva (Olimpija Ljubljana) and Gonçalo Paulino (Vitanest Bilje) were playing in the country.

== Remittances ==
The two countries enjoy friendly relationships and mutual trust, witnessing increasing trade as well. The Portuguese community in Slovenia retains strong ties with its homeland and, between 2000 and 2021, it has sent approximately 2.21 million euros (€) to Portugal in remittances. In the same timeframe, Slovenes in Portugal (numbering around 300 individuals) have sent approximately 6.13 million euros (€) to Slovenia.

== Portuguese language ==
Despite the Portuguese language not being widely spoken in Slovenia there is interest towards Portuguese culture, literature and products. The Portuguese language has a remarkable and projection in Slovenia, it is taught at the University of Ljubljana, and numerous works by great Portuguese-speaking writers and poets have been translated into Slovene in recent years. In 2021, two of the main works of exponents of Brazilian and Portuguese literature, Machado de Assis and Eça de Queirós, respectively "Quincas Borba" and "O Crime do Padre Amaro", were translated into Slovene. Other popular Lusophone authors include Saramago and Pessoa. In 2019 Portugal and Slovenia signed an agreement for enhancing cultural exchanges between the two nations and, since 2022, Slovenia is no longer the only Member State of the European Union without a university degree in Portuguese Language and Culture.

As of today, the Portuguese are part of a wider Portuguese-speaking community in Slovenia, comprising around 60 people from PALOP countries (the majority being from Guinea-Bissau), Timor-Leste or Macau and around 350 Brazilians. People from CPLP countries thus number around 500 people, accounting for 0.02% of the population of Slovenia.

== Notable people ==
- João Henriques (1972): Portuguese professional football manager who is the head coach of Slovenian PrvaLiga club Olimpija Ljubljana

== See also ==
- Portugal-Slovenia relations
- Portuguese in Croatia
