= Javier Hyjek =

Polish footballer

Personal information
- Birth name: Javier Ajenjo Hyjek
- Date of birth: 12 January 2001 (age 25)
- Place of birth: Madrid, Spain
- Height: 1.86 m (6 ft 1 in)
- Position: Midfielder

Team information
- Current team: Cartagena

Youth career
- –2020: Atlético Madrid

Senior career*
Years	Team	Apps	(Gls)
2020–2021	Piast Gliwice	1	(0)
2021–2024	Śląsk Wrocław	11	(0)
2021–2024	Śląsk Wrocław II	17	(1)
2023–2024	→ Recreativo (loan)	20	(0)
2023–2024	→ Estepona (loan)	32	(0)
2024–2025	Melilla	32	(2)
2025–2026	Cacereño	26	(8)
2026–	Cartagena	0	(0)

International career
2018	Poland U17	5	(0)
2019	Poland U18	3	(1)
2018–2019	Poland U19	8	(2)
- * Club domestic league appearances and goals as of 11:36, 1 June 2026 (UTC)

Javier Ajenjo Hyjek (born 12 January 2001) is a professional footballer who plays as a midfielder for Primera Federación – Group 2 club Cartagena. Born in Spain to a Spanish father and a Polish mother, he has represented Poland at youth international level.

== Career statistics ==
As of match played 23 May 2026

Appearances and goals by club, season and competition
Club	Season	League			National cup (Note: Includes Polish Cup)		Europe		Other		Total	
Club	Season	Division	Apps	Goals	Apps	Goals	Apps	Goals	Apps	Goals	Apps	Goals
Piast Gliwice	2020–21	Ekstraklasa	1	0	2	0	0	0	—		3	0
Śląsk Wrocław	2021–22	Ekstraklasa	2	0	0	0	0	0	—		2	0
Śląsk Wrocław	2022–23	Ekstraklasa	9	0	2	0	—		—		11	0
Śląsk Wrocław	Total		11	0	2	0	0	0	—		13	0
Śląsk Wrocław II	2021–22	II liga	11	1	0	0	—		—		11	1
Śląsk Wrocław II	2022–23	II liga	5	0	0	0	—		—		5	0
Śląsk Wrocław II	2023–24	III liga, group III	1	0	1	0	—		—		2	0
Śląsk Wrocław II	Total		17	1	1	0	—		—		18	1
Recreativo (loan)	2022–23	Segunda Federación – IV	20	0	—		—		—		20	0
Estepona (loan)	2023–24	Segunda Federación – IV	32	0	—		—		—		32	0
Melilla	2024–25	Segunda Federación – V	32	2	—		—		2 (Note: Appearances in Copa Federación de España)	1	34	3
Cacereño	2025–26	Primera Federación – I	26	8	0	0	—		—		26	8
Cartagena	2026–27	Primera Federación – II	0	0	0	0	—		—		0	0
Career total			139	11	5	0	0	0	2	1	146	12
