= Simon Ramet =

French footballer (born 2003)

Personal information
- Date of birth: 13 March 2003 (age 23)
- Place of birth: Boulogne-sur-Mer, France
- Height: 1.70 m (5 ft 7 in)
- Position: Right-back

Team information
- Current team: IC Croix

Youth career
- Étaples
- 2013–2017: Boulogne
- 2017–2021: Lille

Senior career*
Years	Team	Apps	(Gls)
2021–2023	Lille II	37	(0)
2023	Lille	1	(0)
2023–2024	Lens II	21	(0)
2024–	IC Croix	10	(0)
- * Club domestic league appearances and goals as of 7 December 2024

Simon Ramet (born 13 March 2003) is a French professional footballer who plays as a right-back for Championnat National 3 club IC Croix.

== Club career ==
Ramet is a youth product of Étaples, Boulogne and Lille. He started playing with Lille's reserves in 2021 after converting to right-back from winger. he started training with Lille's senior team in the preseason of the 2022–23 season. He made his senior and professional debut with Lille as a late substitute in a 2–0 Ligue 1 win over Toulouse FC on 18 March 2023.
