= David Ruiz (footballer, born 2003) =

Spanish footballer

Personal information
- Full name: David Ruiz Montero
- Date of birth: 17 April 2003 (age 23)
- Place of birth: Barcelona, Spain
- Height: 1.82 m (6 ft 0 in)
- Position: Left-back

Team information
- Current team: Eldense
- Number: 21

Youth career
- 2013–2016: EF Gavà
- 2016–2017: Cornellà
- 2017–2021: Valencia

Senior career*
Years	Team	Apps	(Gls)
2020–2022	Valencia B	40	(0)
2022–2023	RSC Internacional	27	(1)
2023–2024	Real Madrid C	27	(4)
2024–2025	Real Madrid B	18	(0)
2025–	Eldense	33	(2)

International career
2019	Spain U16	4	(1)
2019–2020	Spain U17	6	(0)
- * Club domestic league appearances and goals as of 17 August 2026

David Ruiz Montero (born 17 April 2003) is a Spanish footballer who plays as a left-back for CD Eldense.

== Club career ==
Born in Barcelona, Catalonia, Ruiz played for EF Gavà and UE Cornellà before joining Valencia CF's youth sides in 2017. He made his senior debut with the reserves on 22 November 2020, coming on as a first-half substitute for Pedro Alemañ in a 4–0 Segunda División B home loss to UD Ibiza.

On 5 July 2022, Ruiz joined the structure of Real Madrid, and was initially assigned to affiliate team RSC Internacional FC in Tercera Federación. He was subsequently a member of the club's C and B-teams, the latter in Primera Federación.

On 21 July 2025, Ruiz signed a two-year contract with CD Eldense also in the third division. He was a regular starter for the side during the campaign, contributing with two goals in 35 appearances overall as the club returned to Segunda División at first attempt.

Ruiz made his professional debut on 17 August 2026, starting in a 3–0 away loss to UD Almería.

== International career ==
Ruiz represented Spain at under-16 and under-17 levels.
