= Hans Anapak =

German footballer

Personal information
- Full name: Hans-Alexandre Anapak-Baka
- Date of birth: 10 February 2001 (age 25)
- Place of birth: Bonn, Germany
- Height: 1.74 m (5 ft 9 in)
- Position: Left winger

Team information
- Current team: Türkspor Dortmund
- Number: 6

Youth career
- 2010–2020: Bayer Leverkusen

Senior career*
Years	Team	Apps	(Gls)
2020–2021	KFC Uerdingen 05	16	(0)
2022	Schalke 04 II	7	(0)
2023	SW Bregenz	9	(3)
2023–2024	1. FC Schweinfurt 05	24	(1)
2024–	Türkspor Dortmund	4	(0)
- * Club domestic league appearances and goals as of 20 December 2024

Hans-Alexandre Anapak-Baka (born 10 February 2001) is a German professional footballer who plays as a left winger for Regionalliga side Türkspor Dortmund.
