= Kossivi Amédédjisso =

Togolese-Belgian footballer

Personal information
- Full name: Kossivi Jean d'Arc Amédédjisso
- Date of birth: 31 December 2001 (age 24)
- Place of birth: Charleroi, Belgium
- Position: Midfielder

Team information
- Current team: RB Leipzig

Senior career*
Years	Team	Apps	(Gls)
2021–2022	FSV Preußen Bad Langensalza		
2022–	RB Leipzig		

International career^{‡}
2019–	Togo	1	(0)
- * Club domestic league appearances and goals as of 20 November 2019 ‡ National team caps and goals as of 20 November 2019

Kossivi Jean d'Arc Amédédjisso (born 31 December 2001) is a footballer who plays as a midfielder for RB Leipzig. Born in Belgium, he represents Togo at international level.

== International career ==
Born in Belgium, Amédédjisso is Togolese by descent. Amédédjisso made his professional debut for the Togo national team in a 2021 Africa Cup of Nations qualification 1–1 tie with Kenya on 18 November 2019.
