= Georgios Fekkas =

Greek footballer

Personal information
- Date of birth: 24 May 2001 (age 25)
- Place of birth: Athens, Greece
- Height: 1.78 m (5 ft 10 in)
- Position: Attacking midfielder

Team information
- Current team: Giouchtas

Youth career
- 2005–2009: Doxa Vyronas
- 2009–2010: ΑΟ Ymittou
- 2010–2020: Olympiacos

Senior career*
Years	Team	Apps	(Gls)
2017–2021	Olympiacos	0	(0)
2020–2021	→ Chania (loan)	0	(0)
2021	→ Kallithea (loan)	6	(0)
2021–2022	Charavgiakos	18	(5)
2022	Irodotos	0	(0)
2022–2023	Fostiras	26	(5)
2023–2025	Diagoras	14	(0)
2025–2026	Ethnikos Asteras	1	(0)
2026–	Giouchtas		

International career^{‡}
2017	Greece U17	4	(0)
2019–2020	Greece U18	5	(1)
- * Club domestic league appearances and goals as of 18 February 2024 ‡ National team caps and goals as of 17 July 2017

Georgios Fekkas (Greek: Γεώργιος Φέκκας; born on 24 May 2001) is a Greek professional footballer who plays as an attacking midfielder for Giouchtas.

== Club career ==
Fekkas made his professional debut in the Super League U-17 for Olympiacos on 9 September 2017 in a game against Levadiakos F.C. winning 3-0 and playing the full match. As he signed his professional contract for Olympiacos on 19 September 2017, scouting from foreign clubs picked up on that and they were very interested in this past year. His team currently sits at the top of the football table, beating their eternal rivals Panathinaikos for just a few points away. After winning the 2015–2016 with the U-15, he was promoted to the U-17 team.

With the U-15 team, he has 20 appearances and 4 goals and with the U-17 team he has 18 appearances and 7 goals.

== International career ==
Fekkas made his international debut for the Greece national under-17 football team on October 18, 2017, substituting Dimitrios Serpezis in the 65th minute for Greece over a win against Norway for 1–0. His second appearance for the under-17s was against Gibraltar over a wonderful win for Greece ending up in a 6–0. He played full match despite scoring 0 goals. He will be playing on the UEFA Under-17 EURO 2018, as a primary choice for the coach.
