= Mathias De Wolf =

Belgian footballer

Personal information
- Full name: Mathias Marcel De Wolf
- Date of birth: 21 February 2002 (age 24)
- Place of birth: Leuven, Belgium
- Height: 1.87 m (6 ft 2 in)
- Positions: Attacking midfielder; winger

Team information
- Current team: Knokke
- Number: 7

Youth career
- –2020: Club Brugge

Senior career*
Years	Team	Apps	(Gls)
2020–2023	NEC	12	(0)
2023–2025	OH Leuven U23	18	(2)
2025–	Knokke	21	(0)

International career
2017–2019	Belgium U17	13	(0)
2019	Belgium U18	3	(2)
2019–2020	Belgium U19	5	(0)
- * Club domestic league appearances and goals as of 3 May 2026

Mathias Marcel De Wolf (born 21 February 2002) is a Belgian professional footballer who plays as an attacking midfielder or a winger for Knokke.

== Career ==
De Wolf signed for NEC Nijmegen on a three-year contract from Club Brugge in July 2020.
