= Wilkims Ochieng =

Association football player

Personal information
- Date of birth: 15 February 2003 (age 23)
- Place of birth: Nairobi, Kenya
- Height: 1.75 m (5 ft 9 in)
- Position: Winger

Team information
- Current team: Young Reds Antwerp
- Number: 75

Youth career
- –2017: Mouscron
- 2017–2020: Club Brugge

Senior career*
Years	Team	Apps	(Gls)
2020–2022	Club NXT	15	(0)
2023	Koper	7	(0)
2024–2025	Francs Borains	8	(0)
2025–	Young Reds Antwerp	20	(1)

International career
2018	Belgium U16	4	(1)
- * Club domestic league appearances and goals as of 11 February 2026

Wilkims Ochieng (born 15 February 2003) is a professional footballer who plays as a midfielder for Belgian side Young Reds Antwerp. Born in Kenya, he has represented Belgium at youth international level.

== Club career ==
Ochieng began his career with the youth academy of Mouscron before moving to Club Brugge in 2017, where he was later promoted to the senior team and signed a professional contract with the club on 24 January 2020. Ochieng made his debut for Brugge's reserve side, Club NXT, in the Belgian First Division B match against RWDM47 on 22 August 2020, which his side lost 2–0.

On 4 January 2023, Ochieng signed with Slovenian PrvaLiga side Koper until 2025.

== International career ==
Ochieng was capped for the Belgium under-16s in 2018, making four appearances and scoring one goal.

In November 2021, he was included in the provisional squad of the Kenya national football team for their 2022 FIFA World Cup qualification campaign.

== Career statistics ==
As of 16 October 2020

Appearances and goals by club, season and competition
Club	Season	League			National cup		Continental		Total	
Club	Season	Division	Apps	Goals	Apps	Goals	Apps	Goals	Apps	Goals
Club NXT	2020–21	Belgian First Division B	4	0	—		—		4	0
Career total			4	0	0	0	0	0	4	0
