= Noah Aelterman =

Belgian footballer

Personal information
- Full name: Noah Claude Aelterman
- Date of birth: 7 April 2001 (age 25)
- Place of birth: Belgium
- Height: 6 ft 1 in (1.86 m)
- Position: Forward

Team information
- Current team: HSV Hoek
- Number: 10

Youth career
- Merelbeke
- RWDM
- –2016: Lokeren
- 2016–2019: Gent
- 2019–2020: Club Brugge

Senior career*
Years	Team	Apps	(Gls)
2020–2022	Club NXT	22	(1)
2022–2024	Knokke	22	(0)
2024–2025	Zelzate	32	(14)
2025–	HSV Hoek	44	(5)

International career
2016	Belgium U15	4	(0)
2016–2017	Belgium U16	4	(1)
2017	Belgium U17	2	(0)
2019–2020	Belgium U19	4	(0)
- * Club domestic league appearances and goals as of 19:27, 24 October 2026 (UTC)

Noah Claude Aelterman (born 7 April 2001) is a Belgian professional footballer who plays as a forward for Tweede Divisie club HSV Hoek.

== Club career ==
Aelterman began his career at the youth academy of Club Brugge. On 22 August 2020, Aelterman made his debut for Brugge's reserve side, Club NXT, in the Belgian First Division B against RWDM47. He started as NXT lost 2–0.

== Career statistics ==
As of match played 24 April 2021

Appearances and goals by club, season and competition
Club	Season	League			Cup		Continental		Total	
Club	Season	Division	Apps	Goals	Apps	Goals	Apps	Goals	Apps	Goals
Club NXT	2020–21	Belgian First Division B	22	1	—		—		22	1
Career total			22	1	0	0	0	0	22	1
