= Bernard Karrica =

Albanian footballer

Personal information
- Date of birth: 7 January 2001 (age 25)
- Place of birth: Gjakova, Kosovo under UN administration
- Height: 1.86 m (6 ft 1 in)
- Position: Winger

Team information
- Current team: Vora
- Number: 7

Youth career
- –2019: Gjakova
- 2019–2020: Dinamo Zagreb

Senior career*
Years	Team	Apps	(Gls)
2019–2021	Dinamo Zagreb II	29	(6)
2021–2023	Rijeka	4	(1)
2021	→ Sereď (loan)	11	(2)
2022	→ Hrvatski Dragovoljac (loan)	14	(3)
2023	→ Gorica (loan)	15	(1)
2023–2025	Ballkani	33	(8)
2025–	Vora	21	(13)

International career
2018–2019	Albania U19		
2021–2022	Albania U21	10	(2)
- * Club domestic league appearances and goals as of 18 October 2026

Bernard Karrica (born 7 January 2001) is an Albanian professional footballer who plays as a winger for Kategoria Superiore club Vora.

== Club career ==
=== Rijeka ===
On 28 June 2021, Karrica signed his first professional contract with Croatian First League side Rijeka. A month later, he was named as a Rijeka substitute for the first time in a league match against Istra 1961.

==== Loan at Sereď ====
On 9 September 2021, Karrica joined Slovak First League side Sereď on a season-long loan, and was assigned squad number 32. Two days later, he made his debut in a 2–0 home win against Tatran Liptovský Mikuláš after coming on as a substitute in the 86th minute in place of Roko Jureškin.
