= Rafa Pereira =

Portuguese footballer

Personal information
- Full name: Rafael Reis Pereira
- Date of birth: 26 May 2001 (age 25)
- Place of birth: Coimbra, Portugal
- Height: 1.76 m (5 ft 9 in)
- Position: Midfielder

Youth career
- 2009–2010: Oliveira do Bairro
- 2010–2020: Porto
- 2016–2017: → Padroense (loan)

Senior career*
Years	Team	Apps	(Gls)
2020–2021	Porto B	12	(0)
2021–2022	Vitória Guimarães B	18	(0)
2023-2024	Varaždin	4	(0)
2023	→ Cibalia (loan)	16	(0)
2024	Dibba Al-Hisn	0	(0)

International career^{‡}
2016–2017	Portugal U16	10	(0)
2017	Portugal U17	3	(0)
2018–2019	Portugal U18	9	(2)
2019	Portugal U19	2	(0)
- * Club domestic league appearances and goals as of 25 May 2023 ‡ National team caps and goals as of 19 January 2024

Rafael 'Rafa' Reis Pereira (born 26 May 2001) is a Portuguese professional footballer who plays as a midfielder.

== Club career ==
Pereira made his professional debut for FC Porto B in a 2–2 away draw against U.D. Oliveirense on 23 September 2020.
