= Tomislav Krizmanić (footballer) =

Croatian footballer (born 2001)

Personal information
- Date of birth: 21 April 2001 (age 25)
- Place of birth: Zagreb, Croatia
- Height: 1.75 m (5 ft 9 in)
- Position: Midfielder

Team information
- Current team: Croatia Zmijavci

Youth career
- Sesvete
- 2009–2019: Dinamo Zagreb

Senior career*
Years	Team	Apps	(Gls)
2019–2023	Dinamo Zagreb II	38	(6)
2019–2023	Dinamo Zagreb	1	(0)
2022–2023	→ Rudeš (loan)	21	(0)
2023	Croatia Zmijavci	13	(2)
2024	Spartak Trnava	0	(0)
2024–2025	Croatia Zmijavci	25	(2)
2025–	NK Kustošija	0	(0)

International career
2015	Croatia U14	2	(0)
2016	Croatia U15	5	(1)
2016	Croatia U16	3	(0)
2016–2018	Croatia U17	27	(3)
2018	Croatia U18	2	(0)
2019	Croatia U19	7	(1)
2021	Croatia U20	1	(0)
- * Club domestic league appearances and goals as of 15 August 2025

Tomislav Krizmanić (born 21 April 2001) is a Croatian footballer who plays as a midfielder.

== Club career ==
In 2019, Krizmanić signed a multi-year contract with Dinamo Zagreb. At his time with Zagreb, he was a regular member of the Croatian youth national team and was considered a talented midfielder. He made several appearances for the B team in the 2nd HNL, and was also member of the team that twice reached the quarter-finals of the Youth Champions League. In the latter case, he contributed to the elimination of Bayern Munich in the round of 16.

Krizmanić joined Slovak club Spartak Trnava in January 2024. He was featured on the bench but never played a single minute for Spartak.

In July 2025, Krizmanić joined NK Kustošija.
