= 2019–20 in English football =

Football in England
- Season: 2019–20

Men's football
- Premier League: Liverpool
- Championship: Leeds United
- League One: Coventry City
- League Two: Swindon Town
- National League: Barrow
- FA Cup: Arsenal
- EFL Trophy: Salford City
- EFL Cup: Manchester City
- Community Shield: Manchester City

Women's football
- FA Women's Super League: Chelsea
- FA Women's Championship: Aston Villa
- FA Women's National League: not awarded
- Women's FA Cup: Manchester City
- FA Women's League Cup: Chelsea

The 2019–20 season was the 140th season of competitive association football in England.

The season was suspended 13 March 2020 due to the ongoing COVID-19 pandemic, the first time that an entire football season was suspended since the 1939-40 season was abandoned due to the onset of World War II. On 26 March, the season was abandoned in divisions below the National League, with all results being expunged, one relegation and one expulsion taking place.

The Premier League resumed on 17 June and the Championship on 20 June with all matches played behind closed doors.

== National teams ==
=== England national football team ===
==== Kits ====
Home	Away	Home alt.	Away alt.

==== Results and fixtures ====
===== Friendlies =====
27 March 2020	England	C–C	Italy	London, England
20:00 BST				Stadium: Wembley Stadium
Note: Match was completely cancelled on 13 March 2020 with no new date confirmed due to concerns over the coronavirus pandemic.

31 March 2020	England	C–C	Denmark	London, England
20:00 BST				Stadium: Wembley Stadium

TBD	Austria	C–C	England	Vienna, Austria
19:45 BST				Stadium: Ernst Happel Stadion

TBD	England	C–C	Romania	Birmingham, England
18:30 BST				Stadium: Villa Park

===== UEFA Euro 2020 qualifying =====
====== Group A ======
Pos	Team	Pld	W	D	L	GF	GA	GD	Pts	Qualification	(England)	(Czech Republic)	(Kosovo)	(Bulgaria)	(Montenegro)
1	England	8	7	0	1	37	6	+31	21	Qualify for final tournament	—	5–0	5–3	4–0	7–0
2	Czech Republic	8	5	0	3	13	11	+2	15	Qualify for final tournament	2–1	—	2–1	2–1	3–0
3	Kosovo	8	3	2	3	13	16	−3	11	Advance to play-offs via Nations League	0–4	2–1	—	1–1	2–0
4	Bulgaria	8	1	3	4	6	17	−11	6	Advance to play-offs via Nations League	0–6	1–0	2–3	—	1–1
5	Montenegro	8	0	3	5	3	22	−19	3		1–5	0–3	1–1	0–0	—

Source: UEFA
Rules for classification: Qualification tiebreakers

7 September 2019	England	4–0	Bulgaria	London, England
18:00 (17:00 UTC+1)	Kane 24', 50' (pen.), 73' (pen.); Keane (yellow card) 30'; Sterling 55'	Report	Bodurov (yellow card) 36'	Stadium: Wembley Stadium; Attendance: 82,605; Referee: Marco Guida (Italy)

10 September 2019	England	5–3	Kosovo	Southampton, England
20:45 (19:45 UTC+1)	Sterling 8'; Kane 19'; Vojvoda 38' (o.g.); Sancho 44', 45+1'	Report	V. Berisha 1', 49'; Muriqi 55' (pen.)	Stadium: St. Mary's Stadium; Attendance: 30,155; Referee: Felix Zwayer (Germany)

11 October 2019	Czech Republic	2–1	England	Prague, Czech Republic
20:45 (19:45 UTC+0)	Brabec 9'; Ondrášek 85'	Report	Kane 5' (pen.)	Stadium: Sinobo Stadium; Attendance: 18,651; Referee: Damir Skomina (Slovenia)

14 October 2019	Bulgaria	0–6	England	Sofia, Bulgaria
20:45 (21:45 UTC+3)		Report	Rashford 7'; Barkley 20', 32'; Sterling 45+3', 69'; Kane 85'	Stadium: Vasil Levski National Stadium; Attendance: 17,481; Referee: Ivan Bebek (Croatia)

14 November 2019	England	7–0	Montenegro	London, England
20:45 (19:45 UTC+0)	Oxlade-Chamberlain 11'; Kane 19', 24', 37'; Rashford 30'; Šofranac 66' (o.g.); Abraham 84'	Report		Stadium: Wembley Stadium; Attendance: 77,277; Referee: Antonio Mateu Lahoz (Spain)

17 November 2019	Kosovo	0–4	England	Pristina, Kosovo
18:00		Report	Winks 32'; Kane 79'; Rashford 83'; Mount 90+1'	Stadium: Fadil Vokrri Stadium; Referee: Paweł Gil (Poland)

=== England women's national football team ===
==== Results and fixtures ====
===== Friendlies =====
29 August 2019	Belgium	3–3	England	Leuven, Belgium
19:30 CEST	Telford 38' (o.g.); van Kerkhoven 45+2', 55'	Report	Taylor 22'; Mead 26'; Parris 75' (pen.)	Stadium: Den Dreef; Referee: Riem Hussein (Germany)

3 September 2019	Norway	2–1	England	Bergen, Norway
19:00 CEST	Maanum 53'; Hansen 89'	Report	Stanway 10'	Stadium: Brann Stadion; Referee: Lina Lehtovaara (Finland)

5 October 2019	England	1–2	Brazil	Middlesbrough, England
12:45 BST	England 80'	Report	Debinha 49', 67'	Stadium: Riverside Stadium; Attendance: 29,238; Referee: Riem Hussein (Germany)

8 October 2019	Portugal	0–1	England	Setúbal, Portugal
19:00 CEST		Report	Mead 72'	Stadium: Estádio do Bonfim; Referee: Lucia Abruzzese (Italy)

9 November 2019	England	1–2	Germany	London, England
	White 44'		Popp 9'; Bühl 90'	Stadium: Wembley Stadium; Attendance: 77,768; Referee: Stéphanie Frappart (France)

12 November 2019	Czech Republic	2–3	England	České Budějovice, Czech Republic
20:45 CEST	Szewieczková 15', 27'		England 17'; Mead 20'; Nobbs (yellow card) 84'; Williamson 86'	Stadium: Stadion Střelecký ostrov Referee: Ewa Augustyn (Poland)

===== 2019 FIFA Women's World Cup =====
====== Group D ======
Pos	Team	Pld	W	D	L	GF	GA	GD	Pts	Qualification
1	England	3	3	0	0	5	1	+4	9	Advance to knockout stage
2	Japan	3	1	1	1	2	3	−1	4	Advance to knockout stage
3	Argentina	3	0	2	1	3	4	−1	2	
4	Scotland	3	0	1	2	5	7	−2	1	

Source: FIFA
Rules for classification: Group stage tiebreakers

9 June 2019 Group D	England	2–1	Scotland	Nice, France
18:00	Parris 14' (pen.); White 40'	Report	Emslie 79'	Stadium: Allianz Riviera; Attendance: 13,188; Referee: Jana Adámková (Czech Republic)

14 June 2019 Group D	England	1–0	Argentina	Le Havre, France
21:00	Taylor 62'	Report		Stadium: Stade Océane; Attendance: 20,294; Referee: Qin Liang (China PR)

19 June 2019 Group D	Japan	0–2	England	Nice, France
21:00		Report	White 14', 84'	Stadium: Allianz Riviera; Attendance: 14,319; Referee: Claudia Umpiérrez (Uruguay)

====== Knockout stage ======
23 June 2019 Round of 16	England	3–0	Cameroon	Valenciennes, France
17:30	Houghton 14'; White 45+4'; Greenwood 58'	Report		Stadium: Stade du Hainaut; Attendance: 20,148; Referee: Qin Liang (China PR)

27 June 2019 Quarter-finals	Norway	0–3	England	Le Havre, France
21:00		Report	Scott 3'; White 40'; Bronze 57'	Stadium: Stade Océane; Attendance: 21,111; Referee: Lucila Venegas (Mexico)

2 July 2019 Semi-finals	England	1–2	United States	Décines-Charpieu, France
21:00	White 19'	Report	Press 10'; Morgan 31'	Stadium: Parc Olympique Lyonnais; Attendance: 53,512; Referee: Edina Alves Batista (Brazil)

6 July 2019 3rd place	England	1–2	Sweden	Nice, France
17:00	Kirby 31'	Report	Asllani 11'; Jakobsson 22'	Stadium: Allianz Riviera; Attendance: 20,316; Referee: Anastasia Pustovoitova (Russia)

===== 2020 SheBelieves Cup =====
Pos	Team	Pld	W	D	L	GF	GA	GD	Pts
1st place, gold medalist(s)	United States (H, C)	3	3	0	0	6	1	+5	9
2nd place, silver medalist(s)	Spain	3	2	0	1	4	2	+2	6
3rd place, bronze medalist(s)	England	3	1	0	2	1	3	−2	3
4	Japan	3	0	0	3	2	7	−5	0

Source: US Soccer
Rules for classification: 1) points; 2) goal difference; 3) goals scored; 4) head-to-head result; 5) fair play ranking
(C) Champions; (H) Hosts

5 March 2020	United States	2–0	England	Orlando, Florida
19:00 ET	Press 53'; Lloyd 55'	Report		Stadium: Exploria Stadium; Attendance: 16,531; Referee: Odette Hamilton (Jamaica)

8 March 2020	Japan	0–1	England	Harrison, New Jersey
14:15 ET		Report	White 84'	Stadium: Red Bull Arena; Attendance: 14,758; Referee: Katja Koroleva (United States)

11 March 2020	England	0–1	Spain	Frisco, Texas
14:15 CT		Report	Putellas 83'	Stadium: Toyota Stadium; Referee: Danielle Chesky (United States)

=== England U-19 national football team ===
==== Results and fixtures ====
===== Friendlies =====
29 August 2019	Belgium	3–3	England	Leuven, Belgium
19:30 CEST	Telford 38' (o.g.); van Kerkhoven 45+2', 55'	Report	Taylor 22'; Mead 26'; Parris 75' (pen.)	Stadium: Den Dreef; Referee: Riem Hussein (Germany)

3 September 2019	Norway	2–1	England	Bergen, Norway
19:00 CEST	Maanum 53'; Hansen 89'	Report	Stanway 10'	Stadium: Brann Stadion; Referee: Lina Lehtovaara (Finland)

5 October 2019	England	1–2	Brazil	Middlesbrough, England
12:45 BST	England 80'	Report	Debinha 49', 67'	Stadium: Riverside Stadium; Attendance: 29,238; Referee: Riem Hussein (Germany)

8 October 2019	Portugal	0–1	England	Setúbal, Portugal
19:00 CEST		Report	Mead 72'	Stadium: Estádio do Bonfim; Referee: Lucia Abruzzese (Italy)

9 November 2019	England	1–2	Germany	London, England
	White 44'		Popp 9'; Bühl 90'	Stadium: Wembley Stadium; Attendance: 77,768; Referee: Stéphanie Frappart (France)

12 November 2019	Czech Republic	2–3	England	České Budějovice, Czech Republic
20:45 CEST	Szewieczková 15', 27'		England 17'; Mead 20'; Nobbs (yellow card) 84'; Williamson 86'	Stadium: Stadion Střelecký ostrov Referee: Ewa Augustyn (Poland)

===== 2019 FIFA Women's World Cup =====
====== Group D ======
Pos	Team	Pld	W	D	L	GF	GA	GD	Pts	Qualification
1	England	3	3	0	0	5	1	+4	9	Advance to knockout stage
2	Japan	3	1	1	1	2	3	−1	4	Advance to knockout stage
3	Argentina	3	0	2	1	3	4	−1	2	
4	Scotland	3	0	1	2	5	7	−2	1	

Source: FIFA
Rules for classification: Group stage tiebreakers

9 June 2019 Group D	England	2–1	Scotland	Nice, France
18:00	Parris 14' (pen.); White 40'	Report	Emslie 79'	Stadium: Allianz Riviera; Attendance: 13,188; Referee: Jana Adámková (Czech Republic)

14 June 2019 Group D	England	1–0	Argentina	Le Havre, France
21:00	Taylor 62'	Report		Stadium: Stade Océane; Attendance: 20,294; Referee: Qin Liang (China PR)

19 June 2019 Group D	Japan	0–2	England	Nice, France
21:00		Report	White 14', 84'	Stadium: Allianz Riviera; Attendance: 14,319; Referee: Claudia Umpiérrez (Uruguay)

====== Knockout stage ======
23 June 2019 Round of 16	England	3–0	Cameroon	Valenciennes, France
17:30	Houghton 14'; White 45+4'; Greenwood 58'	Report		Stadium: Stade du Hainaut; Attendance: 20,148; Referee: Qin Liang (China PR)

27 June 2019 Quarter-finals	Norway	0–3	England	Le Havre, France
21:00		Report	Scott 3'; White 40'; Bronze 57'	Stadium: Stade Océane; Attendance: 21,111; Referee: Lucila Venegas (Mexico)

2 July 2019 Semi-finals	England	1–2	United States	Décines-Charpieu, France
21:00	White 19'	Report	Press 10'; Morgan 31'	Stadium: Parc Olympique Lyonnais; Attendance: 53,512; Referee: Edina Alves Batista (Brazil)

6 July 2019 3rd place	England	1–2	Sweden	Nice, France
17:00	Kirby 31'	Report	Asllani 11'; Jakobsson 22'	Stadium: Allianz Riviera; Attendance: 20,316; Referee: Anastasia Pustovoitova (Russia)

===== 2020 SheBelieves Cup =====
Pos	Team	Pld	W	D	L	GF	GA	GD	Pts
1st place, gold medalist(s)	United States (H, C)	3	3	0	0	6	1	+5	9
2nd place, silver medalist(s)	Spain	3	2	0	1	4	2	+2	6
3rd place, bronze medalist(s)	England	3	1	0	2	1	3	−2	3
4	Japan	3	0	0	3	2	7	−5	0

Source: US Soccer
Rules for classification: 1) points; 2) goal difference; 3) goals scored; 4) head-to-head result; 5) fair play ranking
(C) Champions; (H) Hosts

5 March 2020	United States	2–0	England	Orlando, Florida
19:00 ET	Press 53'; Lloyd 55'	Report		Stadium: Exploria Stadium; Attendance: 16,531; Referee: Odette Hamilton (Jamaica)

8 March 2020	Japan	0–1	England	Harrison, New Jersey
14:15 ET		Report	White 84'	Stadium: Red Bull Arena; Attendance: 14,758; Referee: Katja Koroleva (United States)

11 March 2020	England	0–1	Spain	Frisco, Texas
14:15 CT		Report	Putellas 83'	Stadium: Toyota Stadium; Referee: Danielle Chesky (United States)

== FIFA competitions ==
=== 2019 FIFA Club World Cup ===
==== Semi-finals ====
18 December 2019
20:30 AST (UTC+3)

Monterrey (Mexico)	1–2	(England) Liverpool
Funes Mori 14'	Report	Keïta 12'; Firmino 90+1'

Khalifa International Stadium, Doha
Attendance: 21,588
Referee: Roberto Tobar (Chile)

==== Final ====
21 December 2019
20:30

Liverpool (England)	1–0 (a.e.t.)	(Brazil) Flamengo
Firmino 99'	Report

Khalifa International Stadium, Al Rayyan
Attendance: 45,416
Referee: Abdulrahman Al-Jassim (Qatar)

== UEFA competitions ==
=== UEFA Champions League ===
==== Group stage ====
===== Group B =====
Pos	Team	Pld	W	D	L	GF	GA	GD	Pts	Qualification	BAY	TOT	OLY	RSB
1	(Germany) Bayern Munich	6	6	0	0	24	5	+19	18	Advance to knockout phase	—	3–1	2–0	3–0
2	(England) Tottenham Hotspur	6	3	1	2	18	14	+4	10	Advance to knockout phase	2–7	—	4–2	5–0
3	(Greece) Olympiacos	6	1	1	4	8	14	−6	4	Transfer to Europa League	2–3	2–2	—	1–0
4	(Serbia) Red Star Belgrade	6	1	0	5	3	20	−17	3		0–6	0–4	3–1	—

Source: UEFA

===== Group C =====
Pos	Team	Pld	W	D	L	GF	GA	GD	Pts	Qualification	MCI	ATA	SHK	DZG
1	(England) Manchester City	6	4	2	0	16	4	+12	14	Advance to knockout phase	—	5–1	1–1	2–0
2	(Italy) Atalanta	6	2	1	3	8	12	−4	7	Advance to knockout phase	1–1	—	1–2	2–0
3	(Ukraine) Shakhtar Donetsk	6	1	3	2	8	13	−5	6	Transfer to Europa League	0–3	0–3	—	2–2
4	(Croatia) Dinamo Zagreb	6	1	2	3	10	13	−3	5		1–4	4–0	3–3	—

Source: UEFA

===== Group E =====
Pos	Team	Pld	W	D	L	GF	GA	GD	Pts	Qualification	LIV	NAP	SAL	GNK
1	(England) Liverpool	6	4	1	1	13	8	+5	13	Advance to knockout phase	—	1–1	4–3	2–1
2	(Italy) Napoli	6	3	3	0	11	4	+7	12	Advance to knockout phase	2–0	—	1–1	4–0
3	(Austria) Red Bull Salzburg	6	2	1	3	16	13	+3	7	Transfer to Europa League	0–2	2–3	—	6–2
4	(Belgium) Genk	6	0	1	5	5	20	−15	1		1–4	0–0	1–4	—

Source: UEFA

===== Group H =====
Pos	Team	Pld	W	D	L	GF	GA	GD	Pts	Qualification	VAL	CHE	AJX	LIL
1	(Spain) Valencia	6	3	2	1	9	7	+2	11 (Note: Head-to-head points: Valencia 4, Chelsea 1.)	Advance to knockout phase	—	2–2	0–3	4–1
2	(England) Chelsea	6	3	2	1	11	9	+2	11	Advance to knockout phase	0–1	—	4–4	2–1
3	(Netherlands) Ajax	6	3	1	2	12	6	+6	10	Transfer to Europa League	0–1	0–1	—	3–0
4	(France) Lille	6	0	1	5	4	14	−10	1		1–1	1–2	0–2	—

Source: UEFA

==== Knockout phase ====
===== Round of 16 =====
Team 1	Agg.	Team 2	1st leg	2nd leg
Real Madrid (Spain)	2–4	(England) Manchester City	1–2	1–2
Atlético Madrid (Spain)	4–2	(England) Liverpool	1–0	3–2 (a.e.t.)
Chelsea (England)	1–7	(Germany) Bayern Munich	0–3	1–4
Tottenham Hotspur (England)	0–4	(Germany) RB Leipzig	0–1	0–3

===== Quarter-finals =====
Team 1	Score	Team 2
Manchester City (England)	1–3	(France) Lyon

=== UEFA Europa League ===
==== Second qualifying round ====
Team 1	Agg.	Team 2	1st leg	2nd leg
Wolverhampton Wanderers (England)	6–1	(Northern Ireland) Crusaders	2–0	4–1

==== Third qualifying round ====
Team 1	Agg.	Team 2	1st leg	2nd leg
Pyunik (Armenia)	0–8	(England) Wolverhampton Wanderers	0–4	0–4

==== Play-off round ====
Team 1	Agg.	Team 2	1st leg	2nd leg
Torino (Italy)	3–5	(England) Wolverhampton Wanderers	2–3	1–2

==== Group stage ====
===== Group F =====
Pos	Team	Pld	W	D	L	GF	GA	GD	Pts	Qualification	ARS	FRA	STL	VSC
1	(England) Arsenal	6	3	2	1	14	7	+7	11	Advance to knockout phase	—	1–2	4–0	3–2
2	(Germany) Eintracht Frankfurt	6	3	0	3	8	10	−2	9	Advance to knockout phase	0–3	—	2–1	2–3
3	(Belgium) Standard Liège	6	2	2	2	8	10	−2	8		2–2	2–1	—	2–0
4	(Portugal) Vitória de Guimarães	6	1	2	3	7	10	−3	5		1–1	0–1	1–1	—

Source: UEFA

===== Group K =====
Pos	Team	Pld	W	D	L	GF	GA	GD	Pts	Qualification	BRA	WOL	SLO	BES
1	(Portugal) Braga	6	4	2	0	15	9	+6	14	Advance to knockout phase	—	3–3	2–2	3–1
2	(England) Wolverhampton Wanderers	6	4	1	1	11	5	+6	13	Advance to knockout phase	0–1	—	1–0	4–0
3	(Slovakia) Slovan Bratislava	6	1	1	4	10	13	−3	4		2–4	1–2	—	4–2
4	(Turkey) Beşiktaş	6	1	0	5	6	15	−9	3		1–2	0–1	2–1	—

Source: UEFA

===== Group L =====
Pos	Team	Pld	W	D	L	GF	GA	GD	Pts	Qualification	MUN	AZ	PAR	AST
1	(England) Manchester United	6	4	1	1	10	2	+8	13	Advance to knockout phase	—	4–0	3–0	1–0
2	(Netherlands) AZ	6	2	3	1	15	8	+7	9	Advance to knockout phase	0–0	—	2–2	6–0
3	(Serbia) Partizan	6	2	2	2	10	10	0	8		0–1	2–2	—	4–1
4	(Kazakhstan) Astana	6	1	0	5	4	19	−15	3		2–1	0–5	1–2	—

Source: UEFA

==== Knockout phase ====
===== Round of 32 =====
Team 1	Agg.	Team 2	1st leg	2nd leg
Wolverhampton Wanderers (England)	6–3	(Spain) Espanyol	4–0	2–3
Olympiacos (Greece)	2–2 (a)	(England) Arsenal	0–1	2–1 (a.e.t.)
Club Brugge (Belgium)	1–6	(England) Manchester United	1–1	0–5

===== Round of 16 =====
Team 1	Agg.	Team 2	1st leg	2nd leg
Olympiacos (Greece)	1–2	(England) Wolverhampton Wanderers	1–1	0–1
LASK (Austria)	1–7	(England) Manchester United	0–5	1–2

===== Quarter-finals =====
Team 1	Score	Team 2
Manchester United (England)	1–0 (a.e.t.)	(Denmark) Copenhagen
Wolverhampton Wanderers (England)	0–1	(Spain) Sevilla

===== Semi-finals =====
Team 1	Score	Team 2
Sevilla (Spain)	2–1	(England) Manchester United

=== UEFA Super Cup ===
This was the first Super Cup to feature two English teams.

14 August 2019
22:00 UTC+3

Liverpool (England)	2–2 (a.e.t.)	(England) Chelsea
Mané 48', 95'	Report	Giroud 36'; Jorginho 101' (pen.)
Penalties
Firmino (penalty scored); Fabinho (penalty scored); Origi (penalty scored); Alexander-Arnold (penalty scored); Salah (penalty scored)	5–4	(penalty scored) Jorginho; (penalty scored) Barkley; (penalty scored) Mount; (penalty scored) Emerson; (penalty missed) Abraham

Vodafone Park, Istanbul
Attendance: 38,434
Referee: Stéphanie Frappart (France)

=== UEFA Youth League ===
==== Group stage ====
===== Group B =====
Pos	Team	Pld	W	D	L	GF	GA	GD	Pts	Qualification	BAY	RSB	TOT	OLY
1	(Germany) Bayern Munich	6	4	2	0	18	2	+16	14	Round of 16	—	0–0	3–0	6–0
2	(Serbia) Red Star Belgrade	6	3	2	1	8	11	−3	11	Play-offs	1–1	—	2–0	2–1
3	(England) Tottenham Hotspur	6	2	1	3	12	12	0	7		1–4	9–2	—	1–0
4	(Greece) Olympiacos	6	0	1	5	2	15	−13	1		0–4	0–1	1–1	—

Source: UEFA

===== Group C =====
Pos	Team	Pld	W	D	L	GF	GA	GD	Pts	Qualification	ATA	DZG	MCI	SHK
1	(Italy) Atalanta	6	4	1	1	10	5	+5	13	Round of 16	—	2–0	1–0	2–2
2	(Croatia) Dinamo Zagreb	6	3	2	1	6	5	+1	11	Play-offs	1–0	—	1–0	1–0
3	(England) Manchester City	6	2	1	3	11	8	+3	7		1–3	2–2	—	5–0
4	(Ukraine) Shakhtar Donetsk	6	0	2	4	5	14	−9	2		1–2	1–1	1–3	—

Source: UEFA

===== Group E =====
Pos	Team	Pld	W	D	L	GF	GA	GD	Pts	Qualification	LIV	SAL	GNK	NAP
1	(England) Liverpool	6	4	1	1	17	6	+11	13	Round of 16	—	4–2	0–1	7–0
2	(Austria) Red Bull Salzburg	6	3	1	2	19	11	+8	10	Play-offs	2–3	—	1–1	7–2
3	(Belgium) Genk	6	2	2	2	5	6	−1	8		0–2	0–2	—	3–1
4	(Italy) Napoli	6	0	2	4	5	23	−18	2		1–1	1–5	0–0	—

Source: UEFA

===== Group H =====
Pos	Team	Pld	W	D	L	GF	GA	GD	Pts	Qualification	AJX	LIL	CHE	VAL
1	(Netherlands) Ajax	6	3	2	1	13	7	+6	11	Round of 16	—	4–0	0–1	1–1
2	(France) Lille	6	3	1	2	7	8	−1	10	Play-offs	1–2	—	2–0	1–0
3	(England) Chelsea	6	1	3	2	7	9	−2	6		1–1	1–1	—	3–3
4	(Spain) Valencia	6	1	2	3	10	13	−3	5		3–5	1–2	2–1	—

Source: UEFA

==== Domestic Champions Path ====
===== First round =====
Team 1	Agg.	Team 2	1st leg	2nd leg
Minsk (Belarus)	2–9	(England) Derby County	0–2	2–7

===== Second round =====
Team 1	Agg.	Team 2	1st leg	2nd leg
ÍA (Iceland)	2–6	(England) Derby County	1–2	1–4

==== Play-offs ====
Team 1	Score	Team 2
Derby County (England)	3–1	(Germany) Borussia Dortmund

==== Knockout phase ====
===== Round of 16 =====
Team 1	Score	Team 2
Red Bull Salzburg (Austria)	4–1	(England) Derby County
Benfica (Portugal)	4–1	(England) Liverpool

=== UEFA Women's Champions League ===
==== Knockout phase ====
===== Round of 32 =====
Team 1	Agg.	Team 2	1st leg	2nd leg
Fiorentina (Italy)	0–6 (Note: Order of legs reversed after original draw.)	(England) Arsenal	0–4	0–2
Lugano (Switzerland)	1–11	(England) Manchester City	1–7	0–4

===== Round of 16 =====
Team 1	Agg.	Team 2	1st leg	2nd leg
Slavia Praha (Czech Republic)	2–13	(England) Arsenal	2–5	0–8
Manchester City (England)	2–3	(Spain) Atlético Madrid	1–1	1–2

===== Quarter-finals =====
Team 1	Score	Team 2
Arsenal (England)	1–2	(France) Paris Saint-Germain

== Men's football ==
League Division	Promoted to league ▲	Relegated from league ▼
Premier League	Norwich City ▲; Sheffield United ▲; Aston Villa ▲	Huddersfield Town ▼; Fulham ▼; Cardiff City ▼
Championship	Luton Town ▲; Barnsley ▲; Charlton Athletic ▲	Ipswich Town ▼; Bolton Wanderers ▼; Rotherham United ▼
League One	Lincoln City ▲; Bury ▲; MK Dons ▲; Tranmere Rovers ▲	Plymouth Argyle ▼; Walsall ▼; Scunthorpe United ▼; Bradford City ▼
League Two	Leyton Orient ▲; Salford City ▲	Yeovil Town ▼; Notts County ▼
National League	Torquay United ▲; Stockport County ▲; Chorley ▲; Woking ▲	Braintree Town ▼; Gateshead ▼; Havant & Waterlooville ▼; Maidstone United ▼

=== Premier League ===
Amid uncertainty and calls for the season to be rendered null and void in the midst of the pandemic, the FA voted for both the Premier League and the Championship to finish their respective campaigns – a decision that finally helped Liverpool, after decades of heartbreak, near-misses and rebuilding, to end their long wait and win their first league title since 1990, taking the lead in mid-August and not surrendering it all season, holding a double-digit lead from before Christmas and eventually breaking the record for the earliest top-flight win in history, whilst also extending their unbeaten league run at Anfield to a third successive season and 59 games – despite a succession of dropped points in their remaining games ensuring they would miss out on breaking any of the previously set title-winning records on top of an early exit in the Champions League knockout stage, the Reds won both the UEFA Super Cup and the Club World Cup in the first half of the season to mark one of their most successful campaigns since 2001. Finishing second were Manchester City, who had been widely tipped to build on their domestic treble the previous season – however, they endured arguably one of the most disappointing title defences in the club's history, losing ground on Liverpool as early as their second game and suffering a number of unexpected and poor defeats, including home-and-away to both Wolverhampton Wanderers and city rivals Manchester United, a decision ultimately put down to the club's failure to replace departing captain Vincent Kompany and then losing key players Leroy Sane and Aymeric Laporte to long-term injuries; despite this, City were at least able to earn silverware, winning their fifth League Cup in seven seasons.

In similar circumstances to the previous season, the battle for the remaining top-four spots went down to the final day – and saw Chelsea and Manchester United scrape through at the expense of Leicester City; Chelsea's first season under new head coach and former player Frank Lampard proved largely indifferent, conceding far more goals than all of the top ten, but they managed enough consistency to ensure Champions League football, whilst a largely underwhelming 2020 went against Leicester, who lost a winner-takes-all final day game against United, the Red Devils securing Champions League football despite an inconsistent 2019 – the arrival of midfielder Bruno Fernandes in the winter transfer window helping to reinvigorate the team. An uneven start to the season for Tottenham Hotspur ultimately saw manager Mauricio Pochettino sacked after five-and-a-half years at the helm; whilst the installation of Jose Mourinho helped push the club back up the table and into a late battle to ensure Europa League football for the next campaign, an early exit in the Champions League and poor performances across domestic cup competitions put paid to any hopes of Spurs winning a trophy – with similar performances in the league raising questions about Mourinho's long-term tactics.

Having been tipped to struggle in their first top-flight season since 2007, Sheffield United defied all their critics by recording both a top-ten finish and conceding fewer goals than much of the top half, even staying in the fight for a European spot up until the final game, an effort that gave the Blades and manager Chris Wilder deserved praise. Arsenal endured one of their worst seasons since the inception of the Premier League, with a succession of draws and winless runs across all competitions in the first half of the season extinguishing the Gunners' hopes of winning the league title and costing manager Unai Emery his job; whilst the season's second half proved to be much better under former player and new manager Mikel Arteta, including winning the FA Cup for the fourth time in seven seasons and ensuring Europa League football next season, further dropped points either side of the suspension ensured the London club would only just scrap into the top eight. Southampton endured yet another underwhelming start to the season, including suffering the worst home defeat in the history of the top-flight in late October at the hands of Leicester City – however, strong away form from that point onwards helped pushed the Saints comfortably clear of the drop, with safety ensured following an impressive home win over Manchester City.

At the bottom of the table, Norwich City endured a disastrous return to the Premier League, suffering relegation with three games to go in a torrid season that saw the Canaries hit with an extensive injury crisis and fail to really make much impact both in the transfer window and in the league itself, despite an astonishing victory against Manchester City at Carrow Road early in the campaign; having been bottom but still in with a shout of survival when the season was suspended, they were ultimately undone by losing every single match after the season resumed. The battle to avoid the remaining relegation places proved to be closer than expected, but both Aston Villa – defying the odds in their first season back in the top-flight – and West Ham United survived the drop, at the expense of Watford and Bournemouth, the Hornets ultimately being let down by both an atrocious start to the season with only a solitary win in their opening sixteen games and their sacking of three different managers, with Bournemouth also being let down by a collapse in points and form either side of the season being suspended despite a remarkable victory over Everton on the final day; coincidentally, all three clubs had been promoted in the same season only five years prior, albeit Norwich had gone straight back down the following year.

Pos	Team	Pld	W	D	L	GF	GA	GD	Pts	Qualification or relegation
1	Liverpool (C)	38	32	3	3	85	33	+52	99	Qualification for the Champions League group stage
2	Manchester City	38	26	3	9	102	35	+67	81	Qualification for the Champions League group stage
3	Manchester United	38	18	12	8	66	36	+30	66	Qualification for the Champions League group stage
4	Chelsea	38	20	6	12	69	54	+15	66	Qualification for the Champions League group stage
5	Leicester City	38	18	8	12	67	41	+26	62	Qualification for the Europa League group stage
6	Tottenham Hotspur	38	16	11	11	61	47	+14	59	Qualification for the Europa League second qualifying round (Note: Since the winners of the 2019–20 EFL Cup, Manchester City, qualified for the Champions League group stage by league position, the spot given to the EFL Cup winners (Europa League second qualifying round) was passed down to the sixth-placed team.)
7	Wolverhampton Wanderers	38	15	14	9	51	40	+11	59	
8	Arsenal	38	14	14	10	56	48	+8	56	Qualification for the Europa League group stage (Note: Arsenal qualified for the Europa League group stage as the 2019–20 FA Cup winners.)
9	Sheffield United	38	14	12	12	39	39	0	54	
10	Burnley	38	15	9	14	43	50	−7	54	
11	Southampton	38	15	7	16	51	60	−9	52	
12	Everton	38	13	10	15	44	56	−12	49	
13	Newcastle United	38	11	11	16	38	58	−20	44	
14	Crystal Palace	38	11	10	17	31	50	−19	43	
15	Brighton & Hove Albion	38	9	14	15	39	54	−15	41	
16	West Ham United	38	10	9	19	49	62	−13	39	
17	Aston Villa	38	9	8	21	41	67	−26	35	
18	Bournemouth (R)	38	9	7	22	40	65	−25	34	Relegation to EFL Championship
19	Watford (R)	38	8	10	20	36	64	−28	34	Relegation to EFL Championship
20	Norwich City (R)	38	5	6	27	26	75	−49	21	Relegation to EFL Championship

Source: Premier League
Rules for classification: 1) Points; 2) Goal difference; 3) Goals scored; 4) If the champions, relegated teams or qualified teams for UEFA competitions cannot be determined by rules 1 to 3, rules 4.1 to 4.3 are applied – 4.1) Points gained in head to head record between such teams; 4.2) Away goals scored in head to head record between such teams; 4.3) Play-offs
(C) Champions; (R) Relegated

=== Championship ===
The race for the automatic promotion spots proved competitive, both before the season was suspended and after the decision was made to resume following a vote by the FA. But in the end, Leeds United made up for their play-off semi-final disappointment the previous year and returned to the Premier League for the first time since 2004 in Marcelo Bielsa's second season as manager, the Yorkshire club remaining in the promotion positions all season despite poor January form and ensuring both promotion and the champions' spot before their penultimate game. The battle for second place proved to be just as hotly contested with three teams in the mix in the last round of games, but West Bromwich Albion successfully held off strong runs of form from both Brentford and Fulham to end a two-year absence from the top-flight, giving Slaven Bilić promotion in his first season as head coach. Both London clubs therefore qualified for the play-offs, alongside Welsh clubs Cardiff City and Swansea City, the latter managed to leapfrog Nottingham Forest in the closing minutes of the season on goals scored - Forest being left to rue a six-game winless run, having been all but guaranteed a top-six finish at the start of July; the playoffs were then won by Fulham, making an immediate return to the Premier League while giving Scott Parker a successful first full season in management.

The battle for the play-offs ultimately proved a closer affair, with many teams battling for one spot; among the teams to miss out were Derby County, who overcame a sluggish start to only narrowly miss out on a play-off position, whilst also managing to sign top-flight legend Wayne Rooney in the winter transfer window. Amid yet another poor start to their season, Reading looked poised to endure a third successive relegation battle – however, the unorthodox decision of newly installed Sporting Director Mark Bowen to appoint himself as manager proved to be a successful one as the Royals rocketed away from the bottom and even looked likely to snatch an unlikely play-off position in the closing weeks of the campaign, falling short in the closing games. Newly relegated Huddersfield Town suffered a similarly dreadful start to their campaign and found themselves battling a second consecutive relegation in a row, but the appointment of Lincoln City manager Danny Cowley and several key wins picked up at crucial points ultimately proved enough for the Terriers to secure their Championship status, the win in their penultimate game that ensured safety ironically being the one to send Leeds back into the top-flight.

The battle at the bottom of the table ended up being one of the tightest in the history of the second tier, with all three relegation spots left wide open going into the last game – and in the end, it was ultimately Hull City, Wigan Athletic and Charlton Athletic who dropped into League One; Hull's relegation came after a complete collapse in form in the second half of the season, the accumulation of just six points after New Year's Day and the sale of key players Kamil Grosicki and Jarred Bowen helping to condemn the Tigers to the third tier for the first time since 2005. Wigan controversially took the second spot, suffering a 12-point deduction for entering administration and falling into the bottom three after the final whistle as a result, despite an outstanding run of form after the season resumed that included an 8–0 win at home over Hull. Charlton Athletic suffered immediate relegation back to the third tier, the London club being left to rue a run of just one win between the middle of October and the end of January despite securing some positive results in their closing games. Having been nearly adrift at the turn of the year, Luton Town saw a resurgence of their own that saw them fight their way to safety, the Hatters being helped by the return of influential manager Nathan Jones during the suspension, whilst Barnsley defied the odds and poor form in the first half of the season to secure their place in the second tier.

Pos	Team	Pld	W	D	L	GF	GA	GD	Pts	Promotion, qualification or relegation
1	Leeds United (C, P)	46	28	9	9	77	35	+42	93	Promotion to the Premier League
2	West Bromwich Albion (P)	46	22	17	7	77	45	+32	83	Promotion to the Premier League
3	Brentford	46	24	9	13	80	38	+42	81	Qualification for Championship play-offs (Note: Four teams play for one spot and promotion to the Premier League.)
4	Fulham (O, P)	46	23	12	11	64	48	+16	81	Qualification for Championship play-offs
5	Cardiff City	46	19	16	11	68	58	+10	73	Qualification for Championship play-offs
6	Swansea City	46	18	16	12	62	53	+9	70	Qualification for Championship play-offs
7	Nottingham Forest	46	18	16	12	58	50	+8	70	
8	Millwall	46	17	17	12	57	51	+6	68	
9	Preston North End	46	18	12	16	59	54	+5	66	
10	Derby County	46	17	13	16	62	64	−2	64	
11	Blackburn Rovers	46	17	12	17	66	63	+3	63	
12	Bristol City	46	17	12	17	60	65	−5	63	
13	Queens Park Rangers	46	16	10	20	67	76	−9	58	
14	Reading	46	15	11	20	59	58	+1	56	
15	Stoke City	46	16	8	22	62	68	−6	56	
16	Sheffield Wednesday	46	15	11	20	58	66	−8	56	
17	Middlesbrough	46	13	14	19	48	61	−13	53	
18	Huddersfield Town	46	13	12	21	52	70	−18	51	
19	Luton Town	46	14	9	23	54	82	−28	51	
20	Birmingham City	46	12	14	20	54	75	−21	50	
21	Barnsley	46	12	13	21	49	69	−20	49	
22	Charlton Athletic (R)	46	12	12	22	50	65	−15	48	Relegation to EFL League One
23	Wigan Athletic (R)	46	15	14	17	57	56	+1	47 (Note: As a result of Wigan Athletic entering administration, the club was subject to a 12-point deduction. In accordance with EFL regulations, the timing of the sporting sanction was only determined once final league placings in the Championship were determined. Since the club did not finish in the relegation places at the end of season, the sanction was applied to their 2019–20 total and final league standings were amended as appropriate.)	Relegation to EFL League One
24	Hull City (R)	46	12	9	25	57	87	−30	45	Relegation to EFL League One

Source: EFL Official Website
Rules for classification: 1) Points; 2) Goal difference; 3) Number of goals scored; 4) Head-to-head results; 5) Wins; 6) Away goals; 7) Penalty points (sec 9.5); 8) 12-point sending off offences
(C) Champions; (O) Play-off winners; (P) Promoted; (R) Relegated

=== League One ===
With the season postponed in March, clubs in both League One and League Two found enough votes to agree to end the season - using Points-Per-Game to help solidify a final points total, both Coventry City and Rotherham United were automatically promoted; the Sky Blues' promotion came just three years after relegation to League Two and eight years after having fallen out of the second tier, marking a remarkable turn of events for the club despite off-field issues that saw them being forced to groundshare with Birmingham City, whilst the Millers secured a second instant return to the Championship in two years (making this the fourth consecutive season that they moved between the Championship and League One), in spite of having fallen off the top of the table just prior to the season being suspended. The final qualifying spot was taken by Wycombe Wanderers, who stormed through the play-offs to record the Buckinghamshire club's first ever promotion to the Championship; whilst they had dropped off the top of the table over the festive period and then dropped further down, the Chairboys recovered enough before the season was postponed to ensure a third-place finish through Points-Ger-Game and give long-term manager Gareth Ainsworth his second promotion with the club in three seasons.

Losing out in the play-off final were Oxford United, who missed out on a chance to return to the second tier for the first time since the end of the 20th century; nonetheless, the U's enjoyed a fantastic season, which included making the quarter-finals of the League Cup and thrashing Premier League side West Ham 4–0 along the way. A poor start to the season ultimately cost Sunderland a second successive chance of promotion despite an improvement with new manager Phil Parkinson, whilst a superb start for Ipswich Town completely fell apart in the New Year, consigning the Tractor Boys to another season in the third tier; both clubs had advocated resuming the season. Lincoln City were another club who had started well, giving hope for a second promotion in a row, but a poor start under new management after the departure of Danny Cowley to Huddersfield Town saw results drop off, leaving them closer to relegation in the table - nevertheless, safety was secured by virtue of the season ending early, a decision that gave fellow promoted side Milton Keynes Dons a second season in League One.

Bury's season practically ended before it started, financial troubles ultimately seeing the club expelled from the Football League altogether, the first team to suffer this fate since Maidstone United in 1992. As a result, only three teams were relegated when the season concluded; Bolton Wanderers, Southend United and Tranmere Rovers. Bolton's relegation came amid similar finance issues to Bury, though they were able to find new ownership to avoid expulsion; however, their points deduction would have had no bearing on their battle to escape the drop, as terrible early-season form and a lack of wins helped consign the Trotters to a second consecutive relegation, meaning they would be playing in the fourth tier for the first time since 1988. Southend United fared little better, only finishing above Bolton because of the points deduction and only avoiding conceding 100 goals because of the season finishing early, suffering relegation after five seasons in the third tier. Despite finding form in the early months of 2020, Tranmere could not escape the relegation zone before the season was suspended and suffered an immediate relegation back to League Two - though they did have some positives in their season, including managing to come from 3–0 down to hold Watford in the FA Cup at Vicarage Road and then beat them in the replay.

Pos	Team	Pld	W	D	L	GF	GA	GD	Pts	PPG	Promotion, qualification or relegation
1	Coventry City (C, P)	34	18	13	3	48	30	+18	67	1.97	Promotion to the EFL Championship
2	Rotherham United (P)	35	18	8	9	61	38	+23	62	1.77	Promotion to the EFL Championship
3	Wycombe Wanderers (O, P)	34	17	8	9	45	40	+5	59	1.74	Qualification for League One play-offs (Note: Four teams play for one spot and promotion to the EFL Championship.)
4	Oxford United	35	17	9	9	61	37	+24	60	1.71	Qualification for League One play-offs
5	Portsmouth	35	17	9	9	53	36	+17	60	1.71	Qualification for League One play-offs
6	Fleetwood Town	35	16	12	7	51	38	+13	60	1.71	Qualification for League One play-offs
7	Peterborough United	35	17	8	10	68	40	+28	59	1.69	
8	Sunderland	36	16	11	9	48	32	+16	59	1.64	
9	Doncaster Rovers	34	15	9	10	51	33	+18	54	1.59	
10	Gillingham	35	12	15	8	42	34	+8	51	1.46	
11	Ipswich Town	36	14	10	12	46	36	+10	52	1.44	
12	Burton Albion	35	12	12	11	50	50	0	48	1.37	
13	Blackpool	35	11	12	12	44	43	+1	45	1.29	
14	Bristol Rovers	35	12	9	14	38	49	−11	45	1.29	
15	Shrewsbury Town	34	10	11	13	31	42	−11	41	1.21	
16	Lincoln City	35	12	6	17	44	46	−2	42	1.20	
17	Accrington Stanley	35	10	10	15	47	53	−6	40	1.14	
18	Rochdale	34	10	6	18	39	57	−18	36	1.06	
19	Milton Keynes Dons	35	10	7	18	36	47	−11	37	1.06	
20	AFC Wimbledon	35	8	11	16	39	52	−13	35	1.00	
21	Tranmere Rovers (R)	34	8	8	18	36	60	−24	32	0.94	Relegation to EFL League Two
22	Southend United (R)	35	4	7	24	39	85	−46	19	0.54	Relegation to EFL League Two
23	Bolton Wanderers (R)	34	5	11	18	27	66	−39	14 (Note: Bolton Wanderers deducted 12 points for entering administration.)	0.41	Relegation to EFL League Two
24	Bury	0	0	0	0	0	0	0	−12 (Note: Bury deducted 12 points for entering into an insolvency event, before later being expelled from the EFL on 27 August 2019. At the time of their expulsion, they had played no matches.)	—	Club expelled

Source: EFL Official Website
Rules for classification: 1) Points per game; 2) Goal difference; 3) Number of goals scored; 4) Head-to-head results; 5) Wins; 6) Away goals; 7) Penalty points (sec 9.5); 8) 12-point sending-off offences
(C) Champions; (O) Play-off winners; (P) Promoted; (R) Relegated

=== League Two ===
As with League One, League Two also opted to end the season early following its postponement in March - this gave Swindon Town, Crewe Alexandra and Plymouth Argyle automatic promotion. Just three years after falling into the fourth tier, Swindon finally picked up enough points to return to League One, thanks in part to the impressive goal-scoring efforts of Irish forward Eoin Doyle. Crewe's promotion came four years after suffering relegation themselves and to the surprise of many, considering their previous campaigns had seen them either only avoid relegation or finish in mid-table; nevertheless, the Railwaymen enjoyed a good season before it had been postponed, managing to win promotion with the most goals scored. Having just missed out on avoiding the drop into League Two the previous season, Plymouth bounced back in style as they sealed an immediate return to the third tier, thanks in part to the experience of new manager Ryan Lowe, who had helped expelled club Bury to promotion the previous year despite off-field problems. Taking the final spot via the play-offs were Northampton Town, who ended a two-year spell outside of the third tier in dramatic style; the Cobblers had actually lost five out of seven league games prior to the season being suspended, a run that nearly saw them fall out of the play-off places altogether, before losing their first play-off leg - however, the team rallied and processed to win both the second leg and then the final at Wembley by big scorelines, ending Keith Curle's first full season as manager in some style.

Exeter City endured another troubling attempt at promotion, having been largely in the top three for most of the season before falling into the play-offs before the suspension of the season; whilst they achieved a comeback result in the playoffs, their crushing loss at the hands of Northampton Town ensured a third play-off final loss in four seasons. Missing out on the play-offs as a result of the usage of Points-Per-Game were Bradford City, despite looking like they would bounce back from relegation the previous year, Forest Green Rovers, who were looking to build on having made the play-off semi-finals the previous year, and even Salford City, who defied all their critics and took to their first season in the Football League very well. Following the unexpected and tragic death of manager Justin Edinburgh weeks after they had been promoted, a poor run of results at several points in the early months of the season saw Leyton Orient likely to suffer relegation - but despite this, the club pulled through and escaped the drop following the vote to end the season, giving hope the O's would build on the success of Edinburgh's promotion.

Because of Bury's demise, only one club was relegated from the Football League this season (the League Two clubs initially voted for no movement between the Football League and National League to take place this season, but this plan was subsequently vetoed by the Football Association). Ultimately, Stevenage finished bottom and appeared set to return to the National League after a decade, following a dismal season in which they had four different managers, and fell to the foot of the table in late September and never left it. However, Macclesfield Town lost a total of seventeen points for various financial transgressions during the course of the season; the last four of those deducted points were initially suspended until the following season, but an appeal by the Football League and Stevenage saw them instead applied to this season, causing Macclesfield to instead finish bottom and return to the National League after just two years; they would ultimately never take their place in that league, however, as their financial problems proved insurmountable, resulting in the club folding a few weeks into the 2020–21 season, and thus making this the final season that they completed. The combination of Bury's demise and Macclesfield's points deductions saved Morecambe, who were statistically the second-worst team after Stevenage, from relegation to the National League.

Pos	Team	Pld	W	D	L	GF	GA	GD	Pts	PPG	Promotion, qualification or relegation
1	Swindon Town (C, P)	36	21	6	9	62	39	+23	69	1.92	Promotion to EFL League One
2	Crewe Alexandra (P)	37	20	9	8	67	43	+24	69	1.86	Promotion to EFL League One
3	Plymouth Argyle (P)	37	20	8	9	61	39	+22	68	1.84	Promotion to EFL League One
4	Cheltenham Town	36	17	13	6	52	27	+25	64	1.78	Qualification for League Two play-offs (Note: Four teams play for one spot and promotion to EFL League One.)
5	Exeter City	37	18	11	8	53	43	+10	65	1.76	Qualification for League Two play-offs
6	Colchester United	37	15	13	9	52	37	+15	58	1.57	Qualification for League Two play-offs
7	Northampton Town (O, P)	37	17	7	13	54	40	+14	58	1.57	Qualification for League Two play-offs
8	Port Vale	37	14	15	8	50	44	+6	57	1.54	
9	Bradford City	37	14	12	11	44	40	+4	54	1.46	
10	Forest Green Rovers	36	13	10	13	43	40	+3	49	1.36	
11	Salford City	37	13	11	13	49	46	+3	50	1.35	
12	Walsall	36	13	8	15	40	49	−9	47	1.31	
13	Crawley Town	37	11	15	11	51	47	+4	48	1.30	
14	Newport County	36	12	10	14	32	39	−7	46	1.28	
15	Grimsby Town	37	12	11	14	45	51	−6	47	1.27	
16	Cambridge United	37	12	9	16	40	48	−8	45	1.22	
17	Leyton Orient	36	10	12	14	47	55	−8	42	1.17	
18	Carlisle United	37	10	12	15	39	56	−17	42	1.14	
19	Oldham Athletic	37	9	14	14	44	57	−13	41	1.11	
20	Scunthorpe United	37	10	10	17	44	56	−12	40	1.08	
21	Mansfield Town	36	9	11	16	48	55	−7	38	1.06	
22	Morecambe	37	7	11	19	35	60	−25	32	0.86	
23	Stevenage	36	3	13	20	24	50	−26	22	0.61	Reprieved from relegation (Note: As a result of Bury's expulsion from League One, only one team is relegated to maintain League Two at 24 teams.)
24	Macclesfield Town (R)	37	7	15	15	32	47	−15	19 (Note: Macclesfield Town were deducted a total of 17 points for various infractions. They were deducted six points for failing to both pay their players' wages and to fulfil a fixture, reduced to four points after appeal. A further seven-point deduction was given for failing to play December's match against Plymouth Argyle. A further two-point deduction was given for breaches of regulations over non-payment of wages. On 3 July the EFL appealed against the independent disciplinary panel's sanctions, and a further four points were deducted on 11 August 2020, resulting in Macclesfield Town being relegated.)	0.51	Relegation to the National League

Source: EFL Official Website
Rules for classification: 1) Points per game; 2) Goal difference; 3) Number of goals scored; 4) Head-to-head results; 5) Wins; 6) Away goals; 7) Penalty points (sec 9.5); 8) 12-point sending off offences
(C) Champions; (O) Play-off winners; (P) Promoted; (R) Relegated

=== National League Top Division ===
As with League One and League Two, the National League curtailed its season, with the final placings decided on points-per-game. Barrow therefore finished top and returned to the Football League for the first time since 1972; the longest gap that any team has had between leaving the Football League (either via automatic relegation or the prior election system) and re-entering it via automatic promotion. Harrogate Town, who were in second place prior to the suspension of the season, won the play-offs and entered the Football League for the first time in their history.

Chorley finished in last place after a dismal season, in which they were on the verge of relegation even before the season's suspension cemented this outcome. AFC Fylde's fortunes declined sharply after two consecutive play-off finishes, and they were left to rue a poor run of results which dumped them into the relegation spots and ultimately sealed their fate when the season was suspended. Ebbsfleet United, who like Fylde enjoyed two strong finishes in the previous season, filled the final relegation spot; they had actually been outside the relegation zone prior to the season's suspension, but dropped into it on points-per-game in place of Maidenhead United. Maidenhead would themselves have been relegated, but were reprieved as the result of Bury's demise.

Pos	Team	Pld	W	D	L	GF	GA	GD	Pts	PPG	Promotion, qualification or relegation
1	Barrow (C, P)	37	21	7	9	68	39	+29	70	1.89	Promotion to EFL League Two
2	Harrogate Town (O, P)	37	19	9	9	61	44	+17	66	1.78	Qualification for the National League play-off semi-finals
3	Notts County	38	17	12	9	61	38	+23	63	1.66	Qualification for the National League play-off semi-finals
4	Yeovil Town	37	17	9	11	61	44	+17	60	1.62	Qualification for the National League play-off quarter-finals
5	Boreham Wood	37	16	12	9	55	40	+15	60	1.62	Qualification for the National League play-off quarter-finals
6	FC Halifax Town	37	17	7	13	50	49	+1	58	1.57	Qualification for the National League play-off quarter-finals
7	Barnet	35	14	12	9	52	42	+10	54	1.54	Qualification for the National League play-off quarter-finals
8	Stockport County	39	16	10	13	51	54	−3	58	1.49	
9	Solihull Moors	38	15	10	13	48	37	+11	55	1.45	
10	Woking	38	15	10	13	50	55	−5	55	1.45	
11	Dover Athletic	38	15	9	14	49	49	0	54	1.42	
12	Hartlepool United	39	14	13	12	56	50	+6	55	1.41	
13	Bromley	38	14	10	14	57	52	+5	52	1.37	
14	Torquay United	36	14	6	16	56	61	−5	48	1.33	
15	Sutton United	38	12	14	12	47	42	+5	50	1.32	
16	Eastleigh	37	11	13	13	43	55	−12	46	1.24	
17	Dagenham & Redbridge	37	11	11	15	40	44	−4	44	1.19	
18	Aldershot Town	39	12	10	17	43	55	−12	46	1.18	
19	Wrexham	37	11	10	16	46	49	−3	43	1.16	
20	Chesterfield	38	11	11	16	55	65	−10	44	1.16	
21	Maidenhead United	38	12	5	21	44	58	−14	41	1.08	Reprieved from relegation (Note: As a result of the knock-on effects of Bury's expulsion from League One, the fourth bottom team was reprieved from relegation for numerical reasons.)
22	Ebbsfleet United (R)	39	10	12	17	47	68	−21	42	1.08	Relegation to National League South
23	AFC Fylde (R)	37	9	12	16	44	60	−16	39	1.05	Relegation to National League North
24	Chorley (R)	38	4	14	20	31	65	−34	26	0.68	Relegation to National League North

Source: National League official site
Rules for classification: 1) Points; 2) Goal difference; 3) Number of goals scored; 4) Number of matches won; 5) Head-to-head results
(C) Champions; (O) Play-off winners; (P) Promoted; (R) Relegated

=== League play-offs ===
==== Football League play-offs ====
===== EFL Championship =====
====== Final ======
4 August 2020
19:45 BST

Brentford	1–2 (a.e.t.)	Fulham
Dalsgaard 120+4'	Report	Bryan 105', 117'

Wembley Stadium, London
Attendance: 0 (Note: The final was played behind closed doors due to the COVID-19 pandemic in the United Kingdom.)
Referee: Martin Atkinson

===== EFL League One =====
====== Final ======
13 July 2020
19:30 BST

Wycombe Wanderers	2–1	Oxford United
Stewart 9'; Jacobson 79' (pen.)	Report	Sykes 57'

Wembley Stadium, London
Attendance: 0 (Note: The final was played behind closed doors due to the COVID-19 pandemic in the United Kingdom.)
Referee: Robert Jones

===== EFL League Two =====
====== Final ======
29 June 2020
19:30 BST

Exeter City	0–4	Northampton Town
	Report	Watson 11'; Morton 31'; Hoskins 80'; Williams 89'

Wembley Stadium, London
Attendance: 0
Referee: Michael Salisbury

==== National League play-offs ====
===== National League =====
====== Final ======
2 August 2020
15:00

Harrogate Town	3–1	Notts County
Thomson 5'; Hall 28'; Diamond 70'	Report	Roberts 46'

Wembley Stadium, London
Attendance: 0 (Note: The final was played behind closed doors due to the COVID-19 pandemic in the United Kingdom.)
Referee: James Bell

===== National League North =====
====== Final ======
1 August 2020
15:00

Boston United	0–1	Altrincham
		Mooney 64'

York Street, Boston
Attendance: 0

===== National League South =====
====== Final ======
1 August 2020
15:00

Weymouth	0–0	Dartford
	Report
Penalties
Whelan (penalty scored); McCarthy (penalty scored); Anthony (penalty scored)	3–0	Jebb (penalty missed); McQueen (penalty missed); Husin (penalty missed)

Bob Lucas Stadium, Weymouth
Attendance: 0

=== Cup competitions ===
==== FA Cup ====
===== Final =====
1 August 2020
17:30 BST

Arsenal	2–1	Chelsea
Aubameyang 28' (pen.), 67'	Report	Pulisic 5'

Wembley Stadium, London
Attendance: 0 (Note: The final was played behind closed doors due to the COVID-19 pandemic in the United Kingdom.)
Referee: Anthony Taylor (Cheshire)

==== EFL Cup ====
===== Final =====
1 March 2020
16:30 GMT

Aston Villa	1–2	Manchester City
Samatta 41'	Report	Agüero 20'; Rodri 30'

Wembley Stadium, London
Attendance: 82,145
Referee: Lee Mason (Lancashire)

==== Community Shield ====
4 August 2019
15:00 BST

Liverpool	1–1	Manchester City
Matip 77'	Report	Sterling 12'
Penalties
Shaqiri (penalty scored); Wijnaldum (penalty missed); Lallana (penalty scored); Oxlade-Chamberlain (penalty scored); Salah (penalty scored)	4–5	(penalty scored) Gündoğan; (penalty scored) B. Silva; (penalty scored) Foden; (penalty scored) Zinchenko; (penalty scored) Gabriel Jesus

Wembley Stadium, London
Attendance: 77,565
Referee: Martin Atkinson (West Yorkshire)

==== EFL Trophy ====
===== Final =====
13 March 2021
15:00 GMT

Portsmouth	0–0 (a.e.t.)	Salford City
	Report
Penalties
Williams (penalty missed); Curtis (penalty missed); Brown (penalty scored); Raggett (penalty scored)	2–4	(penalty scored) Burgess; (penalty scored) Dieseruvwe; (penalty scored) Thomas-Asante; (penalty scored) Lowe

Wembley Stadium, London
Attendance: 0
Referee: Carl Boyeson

==== FA Trophy ====
The final was rescheduled for 27 September 2020 however this was postponed as the FA hoped to have spectators in the final. The date was then agreed for 3 May 2021 behind closed doors as a suitable solution could not be reached to be played with fans.

===== Final =====
3 May 2021
17:00

Concord Rangers	0–1	Harrogate Town (Note: Between the fourth round and the semi-finals, Harrogate were promoted to the Football League through the National League play-offs after the season had finished on an average points-per-game basis due to curtailment as a result of the COVID-19 pandemic.)
	Report	Falkingham 76'

Wembley Stadium, London
Attendance: 0
Referee: Peter Bankes

== Women's football ==
=== FA Women's Super League ===
Pos	Team	Pld	W	D	L	GF	GA	GD	Pts	PPG	Qualification
1	Chelsea (C)	15	12	3	0	47	11	+36	39	2.60	Qualification for the Champions League knockout phase
2	Manchester City	16	13	1	2	39	9	+30	40	2.50	Qualification for the Champions League knockout phase
3	Arsenal	15	12	0	3	40	13	+27	36	2.40	
4	Manchester United	14	7	2	5	24	12	+12	23	1.64	
5	Reading	14	6	3	5	21	24	−3	21	1.50	
6	Everton	14	6	1	7	21	21	0	19	1.36	
7	Tottenham Hotspur	15	6	2	7	15	24	−9	20	1.33	
8	West Ham United	14	5	1	8	19	34	−15	16	1.14	
9	Brighton & Hove Albion	16	3	4	9	11	30	−19	13	0.81	
10	Bristol City	14	2	3	9	9	38	−29	9	0.64	
11	Birmingham City	13	2	1	10	5	23	−18	7	0.54	
12	Liverpool (R)	14	1	3	10	8	20	−12	6	0.43	Relegation to the Championship

Source: FA WSL, BBC
Rules for classification: Initially: 1) Points; 2) Goal difference; 3) Number of goals scored. After abandonment of season: 1) Points per game
(C) Champions; (R) Relegated

=== FA Women's Championship ===
Pos	Team	Pld	W	D	L	GF	GA	GD	Pts	PPG	Qualification
1	Aston Villa (C, P)	14	13	1	0	39	11	+28	40	2.86	Promotion to the WSL (Note: Dependent on obtaining a licence.)
2	Sheffield United	14	11	1	2	46	16	+30	34	2.43	
3	Durham	14	10	2	2	33	10	+23	32	2.29	
4	London City Lionesses	15	8	2	5	25	24	+1	26	1.73	
5	London Bees	12	4	3	5	16	19	−3	15	1.25	
6	Leicester City	15	4	3	8	22	35	−13	15	1.00	
7	Blackburn Rovers	12	3	1	8	13	25	−12	10	0.83	
8	Lewes	12	2	3	7	10	18	−8	9	0.75	
9	Crystal Palace	14	2	4	8	15	33	−18	10	0.71	
10	Coventry United	14	2	3	9	19	35	−16	9	0.64	
11	Charlton Athletic	12	0	7	5	9	21	−12	7	0.58	

Rules for classification: 1) Points; 2) Goal difference; 3) Number of goals scored
(C) Champions; (P) Promoted

=== FA Women's National League ===
==== Northern Division ====
Pos	Team	Pld	W	D	L	GF	GA	GD	Pts
1	Sunderland	14	13	1	0	53	10	+43	40
2	Derby County	15	9	2	4	46	17	+29	29
3	Nottingham Forest	13	9	1	3	27	19	+8	28
4	Stoke City	14	8	1	5	32	17	+15	25
5	Burnley	11	7	1	3	19	13	+6	22
6	Huddersfield Town	12	5	3	4	35	22	+13	18
7	West Bromwich Albion	11	5	2	4	31	20	+11	17
8	Middlesbrough	15	4	2	9	27	52	−25	14
9	AFC Fylde	14	3	4	7	15	24	−9	13
10	Loughborough Foxes	15	4	1	10	24	42	−18	13
11	Hull City	14	2	0	12	23	64	−41	6
12	Sheffield	10	1	0	9	7	39	−32	3

Source: The Football Association
Rules for classification: 1) Points; 2) Goal difference; 3) Number of goals scored

==== Southern Division ====
Pos	Team	Pld	W	D	L	GF	GA	GD	Pts
1	Crawley Wasps	14	12	1	1	36	9	+27	37
2	Watford	11	9	1	1	40	14	+26	28
3	Oxford United	14	9	0	5	44	20	+24	27
4	Plymouth Argyle	14	9	0	5	42	18	+24	27
5	Yeovil Town	13	8	2	3	47	17	+30	26
6	Cardiff City Ladies	13	8	1	4	23	9	+14	25
7	Portsmouth	9	5	0	4	28	15	+13	15
8	Milton Keynes Dons	14	4	1	9	18	30	−12	13
9	Gillingham	11	3	2	6	12	27	−15	11
10	Keynsham Town	12	2	1	9	9	39	−30	7
11	Hounslow	14	0	3	11	4	74	−70	3
12	Chichester City	13	0	2	11	6	37	−31	2

Source: The Football Association
Rules for classification: 1) Points; 2) Goal difference; 3) Number of goals scored

==== Division One North ====
Pos	Team	Pld	W	D	L	GF	GA	GD	Pts
1	Barnsley	14	12	2	0	39	14	+25	38
2	Leeds United	16	11	2	3	35	16	+19	35
3	Brighouse Town	12	8	4	0	25	10	+15	28
4	Liverpool Feds	15	8	2	5	29	16	+13	26
5	Durham Cestria	13	6	4	3	33	15	+18	22
6	Newcastle United	15	6	2	7	19	23	−4	20
7	Chester-le-Street	13	4	3	6	24	29	−5	15
8	Norton & Stockton Ancients	12	3	4	5	24	30	−6	13
9	Bolton Wanderers	14	3	2	9	16	31	−15	11
10	Stockport County (Note: Stockport County deducted one point)	15	3	2	10	25	41	−16	10
11	Chorley	13	2	2	9	10	18	−8	8
12	Bradford City	14	2	1	11	9	45	−36	7

Source: The Football Association
Rules for classification: 1) Points; 2) Goal difference; 3) Number of goals scored

==== Division One Midlands ====
Pos	Team	Pld	W	D	L	GF	GA	GD	Pts
1	Wolverhampton Wanderers	15	14	0	1	83	10	+73	42
2	Birmingham & West Midlands	15	9	3	3	50	23	+27	30
3	Bedworth United	16	9	3	4	50	34	+16	30
4	The New Saints	15	8	3	4	42	31	+11	27
5	Lincoln City	14	8	0	6	44	25	+19	24
6	Long Eaton United	15	7	1	7	25	23	+2	22
7	Leicester United	13	6	1	6	28	41	−13	19
8	Sporting Khalsa	14	5	1	8	28	32	−4	16
9	Leafield Athletic	14	5	1	8	30	35	−5	16
10	Doncaster Rovers Belles	15	5	1	9	24	37	−13	16
11	Solihull Moors	14	3	0	11	18	53	−35	9
12	Burton Albion	12	0	0	12	10	88	−78	0

Source: The Football Association
Rules for classification: 1) Points; 2) Goal difference; 3) Number of goals scored

==== Division One South East ====
Pos	Team	Pld	W	D	L	GF	GA	GD	Pts
1	Ipswich Town	14	11	1	2	53	11	+42	34
2	AFC Wimbledon	14	10	3	1	30	12	+18	33
3	AFC Basildon	14	9	2	3	44	31	+13	29
4	Billericay Town	12	9	1	2	39	12	+27	28
5	Leyton Orient	12	8	1	3	27	14	+13	25
6	Enfield Town	13	7	3	3	32	17	+15	24
7	Actonians	12	5	1	6	20	25	−5	16
8	Cambridge United	15	4	2	9	16	31	−15	14
9	Norwich City	16	3	2	11	34	69	−35	11
10	Stevenage	15	3	1	11	32	56	−24	10
11	Cambridge City	13	2	3	8	16	33	−17	9
12	Kent Football United	14	1	0	13	18	50	−32	3

Source: The Football Association
Rules for classification: 1) Points; 2) Goal difference; 3) Number of goals scored

==== Division One South West ====
Pos	Team	Pld	W	D	L	GF	GA	GD	Pts
1	Southampton	11	10	1	0	53	5	+48	31
2	Southampton Women	12	9	2	1	39	13	+26	29
3	Exeter City	12	8	1	3	38	27	+11	25
4	Cheltenham Town (Note: Cheltenham fined and deducted three points for fielding an ineligible player.)	11	9	1	1	19	10	+9	25
5	Chesham United	11	5	2	4	34	29	+5	17
6	Larkhall Athletic	8	5	1	2	19	15	+4	16
7	Buckland Athletic	11	3	2	6	20	21	−1	11
8	Brislington	11	2	2	7	22	35	−13	8
9	Maidenhead United	12	2	0	10	8	42	−34	6
10	Poole Town	11	1	0	10	11	37	−26	3
11	Swindon Town	12	1	0	11	15	44	−29	3

Source: The Football Association
Rules for classification: 1) Points; 2) Goal difference; 3) Number of goals scored

=== Women's FA Cup ===
==== Final ====
The final was played at Wembley Stadium on Saturday 1 November 2020.

1 November 2020
14:30 BST

Everton	1–3 (a.e.t.)	Manchester City
Gauvin 60'	Report	Mewis 40'; Stanway 111'; Beckie 120+2'

Wembley Stadium, London
Attendance: 0 (Note: The final was played behind closed doors due to the COVID-19 pandemic in the United Kingdom.)
Referee: Rebecca Welch (Durham)

=== FA Women's League Cup ===
==== Final ====
29 February 2020
17:30 GMT (UTC+00:00)

Arsenal	1–2	Chelsea
Williamson 85'	Report	England 8', 90+2'

City Ground, West Bridgford, Nottinghamshire
Attendance: 6,743
Referee: Helen Conley

== Managerial changes ==
This is a list of changes of managers within English league football:

Team	Outgoing manager	Manner of departure	Date of departure	Position in table	Incoming manager	Date of appointment
Luton Town	(England) Mick Harford	End of caretaker spell	4 May 2019	Pre-season	(England) Graeme Jones	7 May 2019
Walsall	(Cayman Islands) Martin O'Connor	End of caretaker spell	4 May 2019	Pre-season	(England) Darrell Clarke	10 May 2019
Scunthorpe United	(England) Andy Dawson	End of caretaker spell	4 May 2019	Pre-season	(England) Paul Hurst	13 May 2019
Plymouth Argyle	(England) Kevin Nancekivell	End of caretaker spell	4 May 2019	Pre-season	(England) Ryan Lowe	5 June 2019
Gillingham	(England) Mark Patterson	End of caretaker spell	4 May 2019	Pre-season	(Scotland) Steve Evans	21 May 2019
Oldham Athletic	(England) Pete Wild	Resigned	4 May 2019	Pre-season	(France) Laurent Banide	11 June 2019
Queens Park Rangers	(England) John Eustace	End of caretaker spell	5 May 2019	Pre-season	(England) Mark Warburton	8 May 2019
Brighton & Hove Albion	(Republic of Ireland) Chris Hughton	Sacked	13 May 2019	Pre-season	(England) Graham Potter	20 May 2019
West Bromwich Albion	(England) James Shan	End of caretaker spell	14 May 2019	Pre-season	(Croatia) Slaven Bilić	13 June 2019
Mansfield Town	(England) David Flitcroft	Sacked	14 May 2019	Pre-season	(Scotland) John Dempster	14 May 2019
Middlesbrough	(Wales) Tony Pulis	End of contract	17 May 2019	Pre-season	(England) Jonathan Woodgate	14 June 2019
Swansea City	(England) Graham Potter	Signed by Brighton & Hove Albion	20 May 2019	Pre-season	(Wales) Steve Cooper	13 June 2019
Bury	(England) Ryan Lowe	Signed by Plymouth Argyle	5 June 2019	Pre-season	(England) Paul Wilkinson	2 July 2019
Hull City	(England) Nigel Adkins	End of contract	8 June 2019	Pre-season	(Northern Ireland) Grant McCann	21 June 2019
Leyton Orient	(England) Justin Edinburgh	Died	8 June 2019	Pre-season	(England) Ross Embleton (interim)	19 June 2019
Chelsea	(Italy) Maurizio Sarri	Signed by Juventus	16 June 2019	Pre-season	(England) Frank Lampard	4 July 2019
Birmingham City	(England) Garry Monk	Sacked	18 June 2019	Pre-season	(Spain) Pep Clotet (Note: Clotet has been appointed as caretaker until further notice and is expected to take charge for the first game of the season. However, he could be appointed as permanent manager.)	20 June 2019
Doncaster Rovers	(Northern Ireland) Grant McCann	Signed by Hull City	21 June 2019	Pre-season	(Jamaica) Darren Moore	10 July 2019
Nottingham Forest	(Northern Ireland) Martin O'Neill	Sacked	28 June 2019	Pre-season	(France) Sabri Lamouchi	28 June 2019
Newcastle United	(Spain) Rafael Benítez	End of contract	30 June 2019	Pre-season	(England) Steve Bruce	17 July 2019
Derby County	(England) Frank Lampard	Signed by Chelsea	4 July 2019	Pre-season	(Netherlands) Phillip Cocu	5 July 2019
Blackpool	(England) Terry McPhillips	End of contract	5 July 2019	Pre-season	(England) Simon Grayson	6 July 2019
Sheffield Wednesday	(England) Steve Bruce	Resigned	15 July 2019	Pre-season	(England) Lee Bullen	15 July 2019
Macclesfield Town	(England) Sol Campbell	Mutual consent	15 August 2019	8th	(Republic of Ireland) Daryl McMahon	19 August 2019
Huddersfield Town	(Germany) Jan Siewert	Sacked	16 August 2019	20th	(England) Danny Cowley	9 September 2019
Bolton Wanderers	(England) Phil Parkinson	Resigned	21 August 2019	23rd	(England) Keith Hill	31 August 2019
Southend United	(England) Kevin Bond	Resigned	6 September 2019	22nd	(England) Sol Campbell	22 October 2019
Lincoln City	(England) Danny Cowley	Signed by Huddersfield Town	9 September 2019	5th	(England) Michael Appleton	20 September 2019
Watford	(Spain) Javi Gracia	Sacked	7 September 2019	20th	(Spain) Quique Sánchez Flores	7 September 2019
Oldham Athletic	(France) Laurent Banide	Sacked	19 September 2019	21st	(Tunisia) Dino Maamria	19 September 2019
Millwall	(England) Neil Harris	Resigned	3 October 2019	18th	(England) Gary Rowett	21 October 2019
Barnsley	(Germany) Daniel Stendel	Resigned	8 October 2019	23rd	(Austria) Gerhard Struber	20 November 2019
Sunderland	(Scotland) Jack Ross	Sacked	8 October 2019	6th	(England) Phil Parkinson	17 October 2019
Reading	(Portugal) José Manuel Gomes	Sacked	9 October 2019	22nd	(Wales) Mark Bowen	14 October 2019
AFC Wimbledon	(England) Wally Downes	Mutual Agreement	20 October 2019	21st	(Wales) Glyn Hodges	23 October 2019
Morecambe	(England) Jim Bentley	Resigned	28 October 2019	24th	(Scotland) Derek Adams	7 November 2019
Stoke City	(Wales) Nathan Jones	Sacked	1 November 2019	23rd	(Northern Ireland) Michael O'Neill	8 November 2019
Milton Keynes Dons	(England) Paul Tisdale	Sacked	2 November 2019	21st	(Scotland) Russell Martin	3 November 2019
Cardiff City	(England) Neil Warnock	Mutual Agreement	11 November 2019	14th	(England) Neil Harris	16 November 2019
Carlisle United	(Scotland) Steven Pressley	Sacked	13 November 2019	19th	(England) Chris Beech	26 November 2019
Leyton Orient	(Wales) Carl Fletcher	Sacked	14 November 2019	16th	(England) Ross Embleton (Note: Embleton has been appointed as caretaker until further notice. Following the sacking of Fletcher, he could be appointed as permanent manager.)	14 November 2019
Grimsby Town	(England) Michael Jolley	Sacked	15 November 2019	18th	(England) Ian Holloway	29 December 2019
Tottenham Hotspur	(Argentina) Mauricio Pochettino	Sacked	19 November 2019	14th	(Portugal) José Mourinho	20 November 2019
Arsenal	(Spain) Unai Emery	Sacked	29 November 2019	8th	(Spain) Mikel Arteta	20 December 2019
Watford	(Spain) Quique Sánchez Flores	Sacked	1 December 2019	20th	(England) Nigel Pearson	6 December 2019
Crawley Town	(Italy) Gabriele Cioffi	Mutual consent	2 December 2019	17th	(England) John Yems	5 December 2019
Everton	(Portugal) Marco Silva	Sacked	5 December 2019	18th	(Italy) Carlo Ancelotti	21 December 2019
Mansfield Town	(Scotland) John Dempster	Sacked	14 December 2019	18th	(Republic of Ireland) Graham Coughlan	17 December 2019
Bristol Rovers	(Republic of Ireland) Graham Coughlan	Signed by Mansfield Town	17 December 2019	4th	(England) Ben Garner	23 December 2019
West Ham United	(Chile) Manuel Pellegrini	Sacked	28 December 2019	17th	(Scotland) David Moyes	29 December 2019
Macclesfield Town	(Republic of Ireland) Daryl McMahon	Resigned	2 January 2020	22nd	(Republic of Ireland) Mark Kennedy	16 January 2020
Cambridge United	(Scotland) Colin Calderwood	Sacked	29 January 2020	18th	(England) Mark Bonner	9 February 2020
Scunthorpe United	(England) Paul Hurst	Sacked	29 January 2020	15th	(England) Russ Wilcox	12 February 2020
Bradford City	(England) Gary Bowyer	Sacked	3 February 2020	8th	(Scotland) Stuart McCall	4 February 2020
Blackpool	(England) Simon Grayson	Sacked	12 February 2020	15th	(England) Neil Critchley	2 March 2020
Stevenage	(England) Graham Westley	Resigned	16 February 2020	24th	(England) Alex Revell	16 February 2020
Luton Town	(England) Graeme Jones	Mutual Consent	24 April 2020	23rd	(Wales) Nathan Jones	28 May 2020
Burton Albion	(England) Nigel Clough	Resigned	18 May 2020	12th	(England) Jake Buxton	18 May 2020
Bolton Wanderers	(England) Keith Hill	End of Contract	12 June 2020	23rd	(England) Ian Evatt	1 July 2020
Middlesbrough	(England) Jonathan Woodgate	Sacked	23 June 2020	21st	(England) Neil Warnock	23 June 2020
Southend United	(England) Sol Campbell	Sacked	30 June 2020	22nd	(England) Mark Molesley	13 August 2020
Birmingham City	(Spain) Pep Clotet	Mutual consent	8 July 2020	17th	(England) Steve Spooner (England) Craig Gardner (Caretakers)	31 July 2020
Huddersfield Town	(England) Danny Cowley	Sacked	19 July 2020	18th	(England) Danny Schofield (Caretaker)	23 July 2020
Watford	(England) Nigel Pearson	Sacked	19 July 2020	17th	(England) Hayden Mullins (interim)	19 July 2020

== Deaths ==
- 1 June 2019: José Antonio Reyes, 35, Spain and Arsenal winger.
- 4 June 2019: George Darwin, 87, Huddersfield Town, Mansfield Town, Derby County, Rotherham United and Barrow inside forward.
- 4 June 2019: Lawrie Leslie, 84, Scotland, West Ham United, Stoke City, Millwall and Southend United goalkeeper.
- 6 June 2019: Johnny Robinson, 83, Bury and Oldham Athletic winger.
- 8 June 2019: Justin Edinburgh, 49, Southend United, Tottenham Hotspur and Portsmouth left back, who also managed Newport County, Gillingham and Northampton Town and was manager of Leyton Orient at the time of his death.
- 13 June 2019: Geoff Lees, 85, Bradford City wing half.
- 17 June 2019: Ian MacFarlane, 86, Chelsea and Leicester City full back, who also managed Carlisle United, Sunderland and Leicester City.
- c. 19 June 2019: Bobby Brown, 87, Workington full back.
- 19 June 2019: Dennis White, 70, Hartlepool United full back.
- 24 June 2019: Graham Barnett, 83, Port Vale, Tranmere Rovers and Halifax Town inside-forward.
- 23 July 2019: Bobby Park, 73, Aston Villa, Wrexham, Peterborough United, Northampton Town and Hartlepool United wing half.
- 24 July 2019: Sammy Chapman, 81, Mansfield Town and Portsmouth wing half, who also managed Wolverhampton Wanderers.
- 24 July 2019: Bernard Evans, 82, Wrexham, Queens Park Rangers, Oxford United and Tranmere Rovers forward.
- 28 July 2019: Peter McConnell, 82, Leeds United, Carlisle United and Bradford City wing half.
- 28 July 2019: Kevin Stonehouse, 59, Blackburn Rovers, Huddersfield Town, Blackpool, Darlington and Rochdale striker.
- 30 July 2019: Ron Hughes, 88, Chester full back.
- 1 August 2019: Steve Talboys, 52, Wimbledon and Watford midfielder.
- 5 August 2019: John Lowey, 61, Sheffield Wednesday, Blackburn Rovers, Wigan Athletic, Preston North End and Chester City midfielder.
- 11 August 2019: Doug Clarke, 85, Hull City, Torquay United and Bury winger.
- c. 16 August 2019: Bobby Smith, 78, Barnsley full back/midfielder.
- 22 August 2019: Junior Agogo, 40, Ghana, Sheffield Wednesday, Queens Park Rangers, Bristol Rovers and Nottingham Forest striker.
- 4 September 2019: Kenny Mitchell, 62, Newcastle United and Darlington defender.
- 13 September 2019: Dennis Edwards, 82, Charlton Athletic, Portsmouth and Aldershot inside forward.
- 18 September 2019: Kelvin Maynard, 32, Burton Albion right back.
- 26 September 2019: Peter Downsborough, 76, Halifax Town, Swindon Town and Bradford City goalkeeper.
- 1 October 2019: Fred Molyneux, 75, Southport, Plymouth Argyle and Tranmere Rovers defender.
- 10 October 2019: Stuart Taylor, 72, Bristol Rovers central defender and record league appearance holder.
- 23 October 2019: Duncan Forbes, 78, Colchester United and Norwich City central defender.
- 28 October 2019: Bert Mozley, 96, England and Derby County right back.
- 9 November 2019: Cyril Robinson, 90, Blackpool, Bradford Park Avenue and Southport wing half.
- 10 November 2019: Les Campbell, 84, Preston North End, Blackpool and Tranmere Rovers winger.
- 10 November 2019: Dennis Sorrell, 79, Leyton Orient and Chelsea left half.
- 16 November 2019: Johnny Wheeler, 91, England, Tranmere Rovers, Bolton Wanderers and Liverpool wing half.
- 23 November 2019: Sean Haslegrave, 68, Stoke City, Nottingham Forest, Preston North End, Crewe Alexandra, York City and Torquay United midfielder.
- 25 November 2019: Martin Harvey, 78, Northern Ireland and Sunderland wing half.
- 6 December 2019: Brian Sparrow, 57, Arsenal and Crystal Palace full back.
- 7 December 2019: Ron Saunders, 87, Everton, Gillingham, Portsmouth, Watford and Charlton Athletic striker, who also managed Oxford United, Norwich City, Manchester City, Aston Villa, Birmingham City and West Bromwich Albion.
- 9 December 2019: Roy Cheetham, 79, Manchester City and Chester winger.
- 10 December 2019: Jim Smith, 79, Aldershot, Halifax Town, Lincoln City and Colchester United wing half, who managed Colchester, Blackburn Rovers, Birmingham City, Oxford United, Queens Park Rangers, Newcastle United, Portsmouth and Derby County.
- 15 December 2019: Alan Jarvis, 76, Wales, Hull City and Mansfield Town forward.
- 16 December 2019: Rod Johnson, 74, Leeds United, Doncaster Rovers, Rotherham United and Bradford City midfielder.
- 18 December 2019: Tom White, 80, Crystal Palace, Blackpool, Bury and Crewe Alexandra forward.
- 20 December 2019: Billy Hughes, 70, Scotland, Sunderland, Derby County and Leicester City forward.
- 21 December 2019: Martin Peters MBE, 76, England World Cup winner, who played as a midfielder for West Ham United, Tottenham Hotspur, Norwich City and Sheffield United, the latter club whom he also managed.
- 22 December 2019: Gary Talbot, 82, Chester and Crewe Alexandra striker.
- 23 December 2019: Alan Harrington, 86, Wales and Cardiff City defender.
- 23 December 2019: George Petchey, 88, West Ham United, Queens Park Rangers and Crystal Palace wing half, who also managed Leyton Orient and Millwall.
- 25 December 2019: Martyn King, 82, Colchester United and Wrexham forward, who holds the record as the highest league goalscorer in Colchester United history.
- 29 December 2019: John Shuker, 77, Oxford United defender.
- c. 30 December 2019: Micky Block, 79, Chelsea, Brentford and Watford winger.
- 1 January 2020: Chris Barker, 39, Barnsley, Cardiff City, Queens Park Rangers, Plymouth Argyle and Southend United defender.
- 6 January 2020: Ray Byrom, 85, Accrington Stanley and Bradford (Park Avenue) outside left.
- 9 January 2020: Jimmy Shields, 88, Northern Ireland, Southampton and Headington United forward.
- 10 January 2020: Eric Brookes, 75, Barnsley, Northampton Town and Peterborough United left back.
- 12 January 2020: Brian Clifton, 85, Southampton and Grimsby Town inside forward/half back.
- 20 January 2020: Mick Vinter, 65, Notts County, Wrexham, Oxford United, Mansfield Town and Newport County forward.
- 23 January 2020: Tom Daley, 86, Grimsby Town, Huddersfield Town and Peterborough United goalkeeper.
- 25 January 2020: Jordan Sinnott, 25, contracted to Alfreton Town at the time of his death, the midfielder had Football League experience with Huddersfield Town, Bury and Chesterfield.
- 30 January 2020: Dale Jasper, 56, Chelsea, Brighton & Hove Albion and Crewe Alexandra defender/midfielder.
- c. 6 February 2020: Jimmy Moran, 84, Leicester City, Norwich City, Northampton Town, Darlington and Workington inside forward.
- 7 February 2020: Brian Pilkington, 86, England, Burnley, Bolton Wanderers and Bury winger.
- 9 February 2020: Peter McCall, 83, Bristol City and Oldham Athletic wing half.
- 14 February 2020: Jimmy Conway, 73, Republic of Ireland, Fulham and Manchester City midfielder.
- 14 February 2020: Brian Jackson, 86, Leyton Orient, Liverpool, Port Vale, Peterborough United and Lincoln City outside right.
- 16 February 2020: Harry Gregg, OBE, 87, Northern Ireland, Doncaster Rovers, Manchester United and Stoke City goalkeeper, who also managed Shrewsbury Town, Swansea City, Crewe Alexandra and Carlisle United. He also survived the Munich air disaster in 1958, helping many of his fellow passengers to safety.
- 20 February 2020: Malcolm Pyke, 81, West Ham United and Crystal Palace wing half.
- 20 February 2020: Jimmy Wheeler, 86, Reading striker, who also managed Bradford City.
- 15 March 2020: Mick Morris, 77, Oxford United and Port Vale forward.
- 19 March 2020: Peter Whittingham, 35, Aston Villa, Cardiff City and Blackburn Rovers midfielder.
- 26 March 2020: Fred Smith, 77, Burnley, Portsmouth and Halifax Town full back.
- 30 March 2020: Alex Forsyth, 91, Darlington outside right.
- 30 March 2020: John Haselden, 76, Rotherham United and Doncaster Rovers centre half, who also managed Huddersfield Town and coached numerous clubs.
- 31 March 2020: Arthur Marsh, 72, Bolton Wanderers, Rochdale and Darlington defender.
- 6 April 2020: Radomir Antić, 71, Yugoslavia and Luton Town defender.
- 6 April 2020: Ray Hiron, 76, Portsmouth and Reading forward.
- 12 April 2020: Peter Bonetti, 78, England and Chelsea goalkeeper.
- 13 April 2020: David Corbett, 79, Swindon Town and Plymouth Argyle winger.
- 13 April 2020: Peter Madden, 85, Rotherham United defender, who also managed Darlington and Rochdale.
- c. 13 April 2020: Alf Wood, 74, Manchester City, Shrewsbury Town, Millwall, Hull City, Middlesbrough and Walsall striker.
- 14 April 2020: John Collins, 71, Tottenham Hotspur, Portsmouth, Halifax Town, Sheffield Wednesday and Barnsley full back.
- 14 April 2020: Cyril Lawrence, 99, Rochdale and Wrexham winger.
- 14 April 2020: Billy Wright, 89, Blackpool, Leicester City, Newcastle United, Plymouth Argyle and Millwall midfielder.
- 14 April 2020: Ron Wylie, 86, Notts County, Aston Villa and Birmingham City midfielder, who also managed West Bromwich Albion.
- 16 April 2020: Peter Phoenix, 83, Oldham Athletic, Rochdale, Exeter City, Southport and Stockport County winger.
- 17 April 2020: Norman Hunter, 76, England, Leeds United, Bristol City and Barnsley defender, who also managed Barnsley, Rotherham United and Bradford City.
- 19 April 2020: Dickie Dowsett, 88, Tottenham Hotspur, Southend United, Southampton, Bournemouth & Boscombe Athletic and Crystal Palace inside forward.
- 21 April 2020: Dave Bacuzzi, 79, Arsenal, Manchester City and Reading defender.
- 22 April 2020: Sid Bishop, 86, Leyton Orient defender.
- 22 April 2020: Jimmy Goodfellow, 76, Port Vale, Workington, Rotherham United and Stockport County midfielder, who coached a number of clubs and managed Cardiff City.
- 24 April 2020: Don Woan, 92, Liverpool, Leyton Orient, Bradford City and Tranmere Rovers striker.
- c. 26 April 2020: John Rowlands, 73, Mansfield Town, Torquay United, Stockport County, Barrow, Workington, Crewe Alexandra and Hartlepool United forward.
- 28 April 2020: Michael Robinson, 61, Republic of Ireland, Preston North End, Manchester City, Brighton & Hove Albion, Liverpool and Queens Park Rangers striker.
- 29 April 2020: Trevor Cherry, 72, England, Huddersfield Town, Leeds United and Bradford City defender, who also managed Bradford City.
- 29 April 2020: Allan Gauden, 75, Sunderland, Darlington, Grimsby Town, Hartlepool United and Gillingham midfielder.
- c. 29 April 2020: Jim Keers, 88, Darlington outside forward.
- 2 May 2020: John Ogilvie, 91, Leicester City and Mansfield Town full back.
- 3 May 2020: John Ridley, 68, Port Vale, Leicester City and Chesterfield midfielder.
- 23 May 2020: Charlie Cooper, 79, Bolton Wanderers and Barrow defender.
- 26 May 2020: Christian Mbulu, 23, Crewe Alexandra and Morecambe defender, he was under contract at Morecambe at the time of his death.
- 26 May 2020: Glyn Pardoe, 73, Manchester City defender.
- 28 May 2020: Paul Shrubb, 64, Fulham, Brentford and Aldershot utility player.
- 30 May 2020: Ron Thompson, 88, Carlisle United wing half.
- 5 June 2020: Jim Fryatt, 79, Charlton Athletic, Southend United, Bradford Park Avenue, Southport, Torquay United, Stockport County, Blackburn Rovers and Oldham Athletic striker.
- 7 June 2020: Ralph Wright, 72, Bradford Park Avenue, Hartlepool United, Stockport County, Bolton Wanderers and Southport midfielder.
- 8 June 2020: Tony Dunne, 78, Republic of Ireland, Manchester United and Bolton Wanderers left back.
- 22 June 2020: Harry Penk, 85, Portsmouth, Plymouth Argyle and Southampton winger.
- 23 June 2020: Dick Oxtoby, 80, Bolton Wanderers and Tranmere Rovers defender.
- 26 June 2020: Theo Foley, 83, Republic of Ireland, Exeter City, Northampton Town and Charlton Athletic defender, who also managed Charlton Athletic and Northampton Town.

== Retirements ==
- 2 June 2019: Rudi Skácel, 39, former Czech Republic and Southampton midfielder.
- 4 June 2019: Gary Taylor-Fletcher, 38, former Leyton Orient, Lincoln City, Huddersfield Town, Blackpool, Leicester City, Tranmere Rovers and Accrington Stanley forward.
- 11 June 2019: Aaron Hughes, 39, former Northern Ireland, Newcastle United, Aston Villa, Fulham, Queens Park Rangers and Brighton & Hove Albion defender.
- 12 June 2019: Tom Taiwo, 29, former Carlisle United midfielder.
- 18 June 2019: Kris Boyd, 35, former Scotland and Middlesbrough striker.
- 21 June 2019: Fernando Torres, 35, former Spain, Liverpool and Chelsea striker.
- 28 June 2019: Stuart Lewis, 31, former Barnet, Gillingham, Dagenham & Redbridge and Wycombe Wanderers midfielder.
- 4 July 2019: Dorus de Vries, 38, former Swansea City, Wolverhampton Wanderers and Nottingham Forest goalkeeper.
- 4 July 2019: Arjen Robben, 35, former Netherlands and Chelsea winger.
- 12 July 2019: Peter Crouch, 38, former England, Queens Park Rangers, Portsmouth, Aston Villa, Southampton, Liverpool, Tottenham Hotspur, Stoke City and Burnley striker.
- 25 July 2019: Darren Bent, 35, former England, Ipswich Town, Charlton Athletic, Tottenham Hotspur, Sunderland, Aston Villa and Derby County striker.
- 26 July 2019: Micah Richards, 31, former England, Great Britain, Manchester City and Aston Villa defender.
- 26 July 2019: Marvin Sordell, 28, former Great Britain, Watford, Bolton Wanderers, Burnley, Colchester United, Coventry City and Burton Albion striker.
- 29 July 2019: Patrice Evra, 38, former France, Manchester United and West Ham United left back.
- 30 July 2019: Marcus Bean, 34, former Jamaica, Queens Park Rangers, Blackpool, Brentford, Colchester United and Wycombe Wanderers midfielder.
- 3 August 2019: Leroy Lita, 34, former Bristol City, Reading, Middlesbrough, Swansea City, Barnsley and Yeovil Town striker.
- 5 August 2019: Willo Flood, 34, former Manchester City, Cardiff City and Middlesbrough midfielder.
- 5 August 2019: Karl Henry, 36, former Stoke City, Wolverhampton Wanderers, Queens Park Rangers, Bolton Wanderers and Bradford City midfielder.
- 6 August 2019: David Forde, 39, former Republic of Ireland, Cardiff City, Millwall and Cambridge United goalkeeper.
- 7 August 2019: Diego Forlán, 40, former Uruguay and Manchester United striker.
- 12 August 2019: Michael Kightly, 33, former Southend United, Wolverhampton Wanderers, Stoke City and Burnley winger.
- 20 August 2019: Jonathan Forte, 33, former Barbados, Sheffield United, Scunthorpe United, Southampton, Oldham Athletic, Notts County and Exeter City striker.
- 24 August 2019: Shaun Wright-Phillips, 37, former England, Manchester City, Chelsea and Queens Park Rangers winger.
- 27 August 2019: Jermaine Beckford, 35, former Jamaica, Leeds United, Everton, Leicester City, Bolton Wanderers, Preston North End and Bury striker.
- 30 August 2019: David Meyler, 30, former Republic of Ireland, Sunderland, Hull City and Reading midfielder.
- 6 September 2019: Andrew Taylor, 33, former Middlesbrough, Cardiff City, Wigan Athletic and Bolton Wanderers left back.
- 7 September 2019: Samuel Eto'o, 38, former Cameroon, Chelsea and Everton striker.
- 15 September 2019: Daniel McBreen, 42, former Scunthorpe United and York City striker.
- 19 September 2019: Dimitar Berbatov, 38, former Bulgaria, Tottenham Hotspur, Manchester United and Fulham striker.
- 20 September 2019: Anderson, 31, former Brazil and Manchester United midfielder.
- 30 September 2019: Gareth McAuley, 39, former Northern Ireland, Lincoln City, Leicester City, Ipswich Town and West Bromwich Albion defender.
- 3 October 2019: Greg Tansey, 30, former Stockport County and Stevenage midfielder.
- 7 October 2019: Tim Howard, 40, former USA, Manchester United and Everton goalkeeper.
- 8 October 2019: Bastian Schweinsteiger, 35, former Germany and Manchester United midfielder.
- 16 October 2019: Calum Dyson, 23, former Everton and Plymouth Argyle striker.
- 29 October 2019: James Morrison, 33, former Scotland, Middlesbrough and West Bromwich Albion midfielder.
- 14 December 2019: Philippe Senderos, 34, former Switzerland, Arsenal, Fulham and Aston Villa centre half.
- 31 December 2019: Sanmi Odelusi, 26, former Bolton Wanderers, Wigan Athletic, Colchester United and Cheltenham Town forward.
- 24 January 2020: Dean Brill, 34, former Luton Town, Oldham Athletic, Barnet and Leyton Orient goalkeeper.
- 29 January 2020: Billy Kee, 29, former Torquay United, Burton Albion, Scunthorpe United and Accrington Stanley striker.
- 6 February 2020: Kenny Miller, 40, former Scotland, Wolverhampton Wanderers, Derby County and Cardiff City striker.
- 19 February 2020: Alan Hutton, 35, former Scotland, Tottenham Hotspur and Aston Villa right back.
- 22 April 2020: Lee Hughes, 43, former West Bromwich Albion, Notts County and Port Vale striker.
- 22 April 2020: Yann Kermorgant, 38, former Leicester City, Charlton Athletic, A.F.C. Bournemouth and Reading striker.
- 26 April 2020: Ricky Shakes, 35, former Trinidad & Tobago, Guyana, Swindon Town and Brentford winger.
- 26 April 2020: Ted Smith, 24, former Southend United goalkeeper.
- 26 May 2020: Alex Cisak, 31, former Tamworth, Accrington Stanley, Oldham Athletic, Portsmouth, Burnley, York City and Leyton Orient goalkeeper.
- 1 June 2020: Brian Wilson, 37, former Stoke City, Cheltenham Town, Bristol City, Colchester United and Oldham Athletic defender.
- 10 June 2020: Don Cowie, 37, former Scotland, Watford, Cardiff City and Wigan Athletic midfielder.
- 10 June 2020: Gary Harkins, 35, former Grimsby Town midfielder.
- 12 June 2020: Stephen Bywater, 39, former Rochdale, West Ham United, Derby County, Sheffield Wednesday, Millwall, Doncaster Rovers and Burton Albion goalkeeper.
- 15 June 2020: Mark O'Brien, 27, former Derby County, Luton Town and Newport County defender.
- 21 June 2020: David Ngog, 31, former Liverpool, Bolton Wanderers and Swansea City striker.
- 22 June 2020: Barry Roche, 38, former Nottingham Forest, Chesterfield and Morecambe goalkeeper.

== Clubs removed ==
- Bury FC were expelled from the EFL League One on 27 August 2019, due to financial issues at the club meaning they could not satisfy the requirements of their notice of withdrawal issued by the EFL for this deadline date.

== See also ==
- 2019–20 in English women's football
