= Robert Brown =

Robert Brown may refer to:

== Entertainers and artists ==
- Washboard Sam or Robert Brown (1910–1966), American musician and singer
- Robert W. Brown (1917–2009), American printmaker and glass artist
- Robert Brown (British actor) (1921–2003), British actor, played M in four James Bond films
- Robert Brown (American actor) (1926–2022), American actor, played Jason Bolt in Here Come the Brides
- Robert Delford Brown (1930–2009), American performance artist
- Robert Brown (cartoonist) (1936–2007), American painter and cartoonist
- Robert Latham Brown (born 1947), American producer, production manager, and author
- Robert Curtis Brown (born 1957), American actor
- Robert Brown (musician) (born 1970), American lead singer of steampunk band Abney Park
- Reb Brown (Robert Edward Brown, born 1948), American actor
- Robert Brown (born 1983), multi-instrumentalist of American musical group Epignosis
- Robert Brown (born 1971), electronic musician of the music duo Autechre

== Military ==
- Robert Brown (sailor) (fl. 1830–1864), American Civil War sailor and Medal of Honor recipient
- Robert B. Brown (1844–1916), American soldier and Medal of Honor recipient
- Robert Brooks Brown (born 1959), U.S. Army officer

== Politicians ==
- Robert Brown (MP for Gloucester), member of parliament (MP) for Gloucester in 1353 and 1358
- Robert Weare alias Brown, MP for Marlborough in 1553
- Sir Robert Brown, 1st Baronet, of Westminster (died 1760), British member of parliament
- Robert Brown (Pennsylvania politician) (1744–1823), U.S. congressman from Pennsylvania
- Robert Brown (English politician) (1921–1996)
- Robert Brown (Ohio politician) (1928–1985), member of the Ohio House of Representatives from 1979 to 1985
- Bob Brown (Australian Labor politician) (1933–2022)
- Robert Brown (Minnesota politician) (1935–2020), member of the Minnesota State Senate
- Bob Brown (born 1944), Australian politician
- Robert Brown (Scottish politician) (born 1947)
- Robert Brown (Georgia politician) (1950–2011), Democratic member of the Georgia State Senate
- Robert Brown (South Carolina politician) (born 1950), member of the South Carolina House of Representatives
- Robert C. Brown (politician), mayor of Wichita, Kansas in 1981–1982 and 1985–1986
- Robert Leslie Brown (born c. 1951), Australian politician and member of the New South Wales Legislative Council from 2006 to 2019
- Robert Brown (Newfoundland politician), member of the House of Assembly

== Scientists and academics ==
- Robert Brown (botanist, born 1773) (1773–1858), Scottish (Montrose) scientist, explorer, author, botanist: R.Br., after whom Brownian motion is named
- Robert Brown (New Zealand botanist) (c. 1824–1906), New Zealand bootmaker and botanist: R.Br.bis
- Robert Brown (botanist, born 1842) (1842–1895), Scottish (Caithness) explorer, scientist, author, botanist: R.Br.ter
- Robert C. Brown (engineer), American mechanical engineering professor
- Robert Cunyngham-Brown (1867–1945), British psychologist and medical administrator
- Robert Rudmose-Brown (1879–1957), British academic botanist and polar explorer
- Robert Brown (plant physiologist) (1908–1999), British scientist, Fellow of the Royal Society
- Robert Hanbury Brown (1916–2002), British astronomer and physicist
- Robert Goodell Brown (1923–2013), American statistician
- Robert E. Brown (1927–2005), American ethnomusicologist, coined the term "world music"
- Robert A. Brown (born 1951), president of Boston University
- J. Robert Brown Jr., American law professor

== Sportspeople ==
=== American football ===
- R. R. Brown (Robert Roswell Brown, 1879–1950), coach
- Robert J. Brown (1904–1985), football player, businessman and author
- Robert Brown (American football, born 1960), defensive end
- Robert Brown (tight end) (born 1943)

=== Association football ===
- Robert Brown (footballer, born 1856) (1856–1904), Scottish footballer, played for Scotland in 1884, nicknamed 'Sparrow'
- Robert Brown (footballer, born 1860) (1860–1940), Scottish footballer, played for Scotland in 1885, nicknamed 'Plumber'
- Robert Brown (football manager) (1873–1935), English football manager
- Robert George Brown (fl. 1920s), English footballer
- Sailor Brown (Robert Albert John Brown, 1915–2008), English footballer

=== Other sports ===
- Robert Brown (New Zealand cricketer) (1850–1934)
- Robert Brown (baseball) (fl. 1874), American baseball player
- Robert Brown (sport shooter) (1873–1918), British Olympic shooter
- Bob Brown (baseball, born 1876) (Robert Paul Brown, 1876–1962), American baseball player, manager, and team owner
- Red Brown (basketball) (1907–1992), American college basketball coach, athletic director
- Robert Brown (American racing driver), NASCAR Cup Series driver in the 1974 Winston 500
- Robert Brown (South African cricketer) (born 1957)
- Dale Brown (boxer) or Robert Dale Brown (born 1971), Canadian boxer
- Robert Brown, English racing driver in the 2008 Formula Palmer Audi season

== Other people ==
- Robert Brown (agriculturalist) (1757–1831), Scottish rural and agricultural writer
- Robert Brown (trade unionist) (1848–1917), Scottish trade union leader
- Robert Allan Brown (1849–1931), Canadian-American prospector and mining promoter
- Robert G. Brown (1857–1920), American inventor of the telephone handset
- Robert Brown (prelate) (1877–1947), Roman Catholic prelate, apostolic prefect of Zambesi
- R. Lewis Brown (1892–1948), U.S. federal judge
- Robert R. Brown (bishop) (1910–1994), author and Episcopal bishop of Arkansas
- Robert Brown (archdeacon of Bedford) (1914–2001), Anglican archdeacon of Bedford
- Robert Brown (archdeacon of Killala), Anglican priest in Ireland
- Robert James Brown (moderator) (1792–1872), Scottish minister
- Robert McAfee Brown (1920–2001), American Protestant theologian and peace activist
- Bob Brown (newspaper publisher) (Robert Lloyd Brown, 1930–1984), Las Vegas newspaper editor and publisher
- Robert K. Brown (born 1932), American combat correspondent and investigative journalist
- Robert L. Brown (Arkansas judge) (born 1941), associate justice of the Arkansas Supreme Court
- Robert Brown (born 1957), Scottish man wrongly convicted of murder in the Robert Brown case in 1977
- Robert M. Brown, 1978 recipient of the Railroader of the Year award
- Robert S. Brown (1863–1927), first Black physician in Minneapolis
- Robert Brown (solicitor) (1844–1912), British solicitor and classical philologist
- Robert Arthur Brown Jr. (1914–1972), Canadian oilman

== See also ==
- Bert Brown (disambiguation)
- Bob Brown (disambiguation)
- Bobby Brown (disambiguation)
- Rob Brown (disambiguation)
- Robby Brown (disambiguation)
- Robert Browne (disambiguation)
