= Bobby Brown (disambiguation) =

Bobby Brown (born 1969) is an American R&B singer.

Bobby Brown may also refer to:

== People ==
=== Soccer players ===
- Bobby Brown (footballer, born 1887), English footballer
- Bobby Brown (footballer, born 1923) (1923–2020), Scottish goalkeeper and manager
- Bobby Brown (footballer, born 1931) (1931–2019), Scottish full back
- Bobby Brown (footballer, born 1940), English centre forward in the 1960s with Northampton and Cardiff
- Bobby Brown (footballer, born 1953), English midfielder for Sheffield Wednesday
- Bobby Brown (footballer, born 1955), Scottish full back

=== Other athletes ===
- Bobby Brown (wide receiver) (born 1977), American football player
- Bobby Brown III (born 2000), American football defensive lineman
- Bobby Brown (third baseman) (1924–2021), American baseball player and executive
- Bobby Brown (outfielder) (born 1954), American baseball player
- Bobby Brown (basketball) (born 1984), American basketball player
- Bobby Brown (freestyle skier) (born 1991), American freeskier

=== Entertainers ===
- Bobby J. Brown (1963–2026), American actor
- Millie Bobby Brown (born 2004), British actress and film producer

== Other uses ==
- "Bobby Brown" (song), a 1979 song from the Frank Zappa album Sheik Yerbouti
- Bobby Brown Park, a Georgia state park near the South Carolina border

== See also ==
- Bobbi Brown (born 1957), American makeup artist and author
- Bobbie Brown (born 1969), American actress, model, and Miss Louisiana Teen USA 1987
- Bobbie E. Brown (1903–1971), World War II Congressional Medal of Honor recipient
- Bobbi Kristina Brown (1993–2015), American media personality and daughter of Whitney Houston and Bobby Brown
- Bob Brown (disambiguation)
- Rob Brown (disambiguation)
- Robby Brown (disambiguation)
- Robert Brown (disambiguation)
- Robert Browne (disambiguation)
