= Adam Yacenda =

Newspaper publisher and editor

Adam John Yacenda (December 17, 1915 – June 13, 1986) was an American newspaper publisher and political adviser. He began his career working for various newspapers in New York and New Jersey before moving to California in the 1940s for health reasons. There, he published the Beverly Hills Bulletin before taking a job as then-U.S. Representative Richard Nixon's press secretary. After Nixon's success senate campaign in 1950, Yacenda moved to Las Vegas where he became editor of the Las Vegas Sun.

Yacenda subsequently worked on the re-election campaign of Governor Charles H. Russell before founding the North Las Vegas based Valley Times in 1959 as a weekly publication. As publisher of the new paper, he became an advocate for the city's growth. The paper grew quickly, becoming a tri-weekly before Yacenda decided to sell the paper to Bob Brown in 1973 for health reasons. Yacenda remained political and socially active. He continued to write for several Las Vegas publications, worked as a close adviser to Oran Gragson on four successful election campaigns, and helped to establish the North Las Vegas Library.

Yacenda died in Houston in 1986 while awaiting heart surgery.

== Career ==
Adam John Yacenda was born December 17, 1915, in Jersey City, New Jersey. He began his career as a stringer for the New York World-Telegram before spending time at several New Jersey newspapers. He moved to California during World War II for health reasons. There, he took a job publishing the Beverly Hills Bulletin for owner Will Rogers, Jr.

In 1950, Yacenda became then-congressman Richard Nixon's press secretary. After leading Nixon's successful senate campaign over Helen Gahagan Douglas, Yacenda moved to Las Vegas in search of a warmer climate. He interviewed with the Las Vegas Review-Journal, but neither party was very interested. Instead, Yacenda took a job as a reporter for the recently founded Las Vegas Sun. Two years later, he was promoted to editor.

In 1954, Yacenda left the Sun to work on the re-election campaign of Republican Governor Charles H. Russell. He was slated to run the governor's office after the campaign. However, late in the campaign the Sun published a story alleging corruption by Russell's opponent, Vail Pittman, which helped ensure re-election. Russell thus felt a high ranking position in his government for Yacenda would look like a payoff, and Yacenda returned to the Sun as managing editor instead.

In late 1958, Yacenda grew tired of Sun owner Hank Greenspun and other executives interfering with the daily operations of the paper and resigned in order to found a paper in his hometown, North Las Vegas. On March 26, 1959, the first issue of the weekly North Las Vegas and Moapa Valley Times was published, named for the two areas it aimed to serve. (The name was soon shortened to simply Valley Times.) Through his paper, whose mission statement read "A Newspaper Dedicated to Serving the People", Yacenda became an active promoter of growth in North Las Vegas. His locally oriented column, "Adam's Atoms", was published on the front page of his paper for several years.

The Valley Times quickly surpassed its rival North Las Vegas News, published by Greenspun, and in November the two papers merged. Under Yacenda's leadership, the paper continued to grow. In 1963, it moved to twice weekly publication. Explaining the growth years later, reporter Bruce Hasley remarked "[Yacenda] really understood how to make a small community paper succeed. I will never forget his hammering away at photos of children and dogs and getting as many names of local people in the paper as we could."

The Valley Times expanded to tri-weekly publication in 1973, but North Las Vegas never saw the growth Yacenda had envisioned. The city council was in turmoil and the community received little support from the state government which did not view it as having a unique identity separate from Las Vegas. Facing heart surgery for a defective heart valve, Yacenda sold his paper to Bob Brown in November 1973. Upon the sale, Brown described Yacenda as "one of Nevada's outstanding newspaperman. He has done an amazing job building the Valley Times against tremendous odds ...Adam Yacenda has made the Valley Times a very successful and widely read newspaper."

Yacenda remained politically active throughout his life. He was a close adviser to Oran Gragson on his four successful campaigns for Las Vegas mayor and an unsuccessful bid for governor in 1962. As Yacenda aged, he found the Democratic Party to be a better fit to his ideology and switched his allegiance. He was asked by the Democratic Party to run for a state senate seat in 1966, but declined the invitation. He attempted to aid Democrats Ed Fike and Mike O'Callaghan in late 1960s election campaigns, but was blocked by the party who felt he was too independent. In 1986, Hasley recalled, "[Yacenda] had one of the shrewdest political minds around ... a lot of people in office today owe their careers to him."

After selling the Valley Times, Yacenda contributed to a variety of Las Vegas area publications, including helping with the Sun's youth forum in 1984. Yacenda remained active in the North Las Vegas community until his death. He is credited for being a key figure in creation of North Las Vegas Library, to which he donated both his time and money.

== Death and legacy ==
Yacenda died in Houston, Texas, on June 13, 1986, while awaiting heart surgery. His funeral was held in Los Angeles where much of his immediate family lived at the time. Upon his death, Las Vegas Today editor Norma Staley described Yacenda as "a first class journalist [and] a super human being." Gragson credited Yacenda for his political success and described him as "a close associate and dear friend ... he was one of few who believed I had a chance" to win the mayor's office. "He was a credit to his profession and a stickler about facts", he added.

== Personal life ==
Yacenda's brother, Rudy, worked with him at the Las Vegas Sun in the accounting department. He had four other brothers – Dom, Pat, Albert, and Sam – and two sisters – Claire Vaughn and Mary.
