= Bob Brown (disambiguation) =

Bob Brown (born 1944) is the former Australian Greens parliamentary leader.

Bob Brown may also refer to:

== Other politicians ==
- Bob Brown (Australian Labor politician) (1933–2022), former Australian Labor Party politician
- Bob Brown (Montana politician) (born 1947), Secretary of State of Montana

== Sports ==
=== Association football (soccer) ===
- Bob Brown (footballer, born 1869) (1869–?), English footballer with Southampton and Queen's Park Rangers in the 1890s
- Bob Brown (footballer, born 1870) (1870–1943), Scottish footballer with Cambuslang, Sheffield Wednesday, Bolton Wanderers, Scotland
- Bob Brown (footballer, born 1895) (1895–1980), English-born footballer who played as a left back

=== Baseball ===
- Bob Brown (baseball, born 1876) (1876–1962), member of the Canadian Baseball Hall of Fame
- Bob Brown (pitcher) (1911–1990), American baseball pitcher for the Boston Braves (1930–1936)

=== Basketball ===
- Bob Brown (basketball, born 1921) (1921–2001), American basketball player in the NBL in the 1940s
- Bob Brown (basketball, born 1923) (1923–2016), American basketball player in the NBA in the 1940s and 1950s

=== Gridiron football ===
- Bob Brown (Canadian football) (1943–2022), American football defensive lineman in the Canadian Football League
- Bob Brown (defensive lineman) (1939–1998), American NFL football player, 1966–1976
- Bob Brown (offensive lineman) (1941–2023), American NFL football player (1964–1973)

=== Other sports ===
- Bob Brown (motorcyclist) (1930–1960), Australian motorcycle road racer
- Bob Brown (ice hockey) (born 1950), Canadian former professional ice hockey player who played in the World Hockey Association
- Bob Brown (rugby league) (1907–1987), English rugby league footballer
- Bob Brown (rugby union) (born 1953), rugby union player who represented Australia
- Bob Brown (wrestler) (1938–1997), Canadian professional wrestler

== Others ==
- Bob Brown (comics) (1915–1977), American comic book artist
- Bob Brown (The Unit), a character on the CBS television series The Unit
- Bob Brown (newspaper publisher) (1930–1984), Nevada newspaper editor and publisher
- Bob Brown (writer, poet, publisher) (1886–1959), American writer and publisher
- Bob Brown, American businessman who founded and operated Champion Aircraft
- Bob Brown, Australian writer of "Give Me a Home Among the Gumtrees"

== See also ==
- Bobby Brown (disambiguation)
- Rob Brown (disambiguation)
- Robby Brown (disambiguation)
- Robert Brown (disambiguation)
- Robert Browne (disambiguation)
- Bob Braun (1929–2001), American television and radio personality
