= Valley Times (North Las Vegas) =

Defunct daily newspaper

The Valley Times was a daily newspaper based in North Las Vegas, Nevada.

== History ==
=== 1959–1973: Adam Yacenda ===
In late 1958, Las Vegas Sun managing editor, Adam Yacenda grew tired of Sun owner Hank Greenspun and other executives interfering with the daily operations of the paper and resigned in order to found a paper in his hometown, North Las Vegas. On March 26, 1959, the first issue of the weekly North Las Vegas and Moapa Valley Times was published, named for the two areas it aimed to serve. (Greenspun also claimed he was the founder and owner of the new paper, but lost the battle and Yacenda was eventually declared the rightful owner.) The paper initially cost 10¢ and was published weekly. The front page headline of the first issue read "No. Vegas Growth Looms", hinting at what would be the paper's early purpose – promoting growth in North Las Vegas. The second issue carried the paper's statement of purpose: "A Newspaper Dedicated to Serving the People".

The Valley Times quickly surpassed its rival North Las Vegas News, published by Greenspun, and in November the News suspended publication to join forces. Greenspun agreed to provide printing services for the Valley Times going forward. The paper continued to grow rapidly and the name was soon shortened to simply Valley Times. In 1963, the Valley Times changed to twice-weekly publication. In 1973, it went to thrice weekly publication. Explaining the growth years later, reporter Bruce Hasley remarked "[Yacenda] really understood how to make a small community paper succeed ... getting as many names of local people in the paper as we could."

=== 1973–1984: Bob Brown ===
Facing health issues, Yacenda decided to sell the paper in 1973. On November 1, Bob Brown purchased the Valley Times through his newly formed Las Vegas Valley Publishing Company. The sale was officially announced on the front page of the November 7 issue. In the article, Brown praised Yacenda for "building the Valley Times against tremendous odds" and promised "a number of personnel additions and political changes at the paper," but assured his readers the paper would remain politically independent. Under his leadership, the paper expanded to daily publication in April 1975. The move made Las Vegas together with New York City the only U.S. cities with three competing daily newspapers.

Brown soon hired longtime Las Vegas journalists A.D. Hopkins and Bruce Hasley to lead his staff. The Valley Times aimed to cover the gaming industry heavily, viewing it as the political and business core of the Vegas community. He hired reporters to dig deep into the industry and top reporter Ned Day uncovered mob connections at the Argent-owned casinos of Stardust, Fremont, and Hacienda, which were run by Frank Rosenthal. He also uncovered Kansas City-based mob connections at Tropicana. The paper became a "must read" for politicians and the gaming industry, despite the fact its daily circulation peaked at around 10,000 copies compared to 69,000 for the Las Vegas Review-Journal and 43,000 for the Las Vegas Sun.

In financial trouble, the Valley Times became involved with the mob itself. According to a 1979 expose by the Reno Evening Gazette, Brown switched the paper's editorial position in 1976 from criticizing the state government for not being hard enough on Rosenthal to supporting him. From 1976 to 1977, the Valley Times' received $368,000 from ad man Jerry May for fake ads that never ran. Brown kept 10% for the Times, passing the rest back to May who funnelled the money to the mob in Chicago. May was convicted of money laundering in 1984 for his involvement in the scheme.

After he was elected governor in 1978, Robert List went public with accusations that Brown and Rothenthal had attempted to extort him. He said Brown has promised to withhold unfavorable stories in exchange for a gaming license for Rosenthal. Brown denied the accusations and List declined to aid the FBI in investigating the claim, citing the hectic final days of the campaign season. Shortly after the election, the Valley Times published stories about List receiving comps from Stardust while working as attorney general. List subsequently repaid $3,200 to the casino.

Brown stopped paying payroll taxes and filed for bankruptcy. The IRS seized control on Times assets, including its buildings and printing presses, in July 1982 as the paper owed $200,000 in back taxes. Although he won the assets back in court, Brown was not able to turn around the struggling paper before his death on June 8, 1984.

After Brown's death, the U.S. Bankruptcy Court appointed Berkeley Bunker as trustee. He ordered the paper to close down and its last issue was published on June 22.
