= Robert Edward Brown =

Robert Edward Brown may refer to:

- Reb Brown (Robert Edward Brown, born 1948), American actor
- Robert Brown (Scottish politician) (born 1947), Scottish politician

== See also ==
- Robert Brown (disambiguation)
