= Robert James Brown =

Robert James Brown may refer to:

- Bob Brown (born 1944), Australian politician, medical doctor and environmentalist, leader of the Australian Greens
- Bob Brown (Australian Labor politician) (1933–2022)
- Robert James Brown (moderator) (1792–1872), Scottish minister
- Robert Brown (British actor) (1921–2003)

== See also ==
- Robert Brown (disambiguation)
