= Robert Browne =

Robert Browne may refer to:

== Politicians ==
- Robert Browne (died 1568/69), in 1554 member of parliament (MP) for Colchester
- Robert Browne (died 1558), MP for Dunwich
- Robert Browne (by 1533 – 1565 or later), MP for Newport
- Robert Browne (died 1623), MP for Lichfield in 1601
- Robert Browne (1695–1757), MP for Dorchester
- Robert Browne (of Frampton) (1602–1934), English lawyer and politician
- Robert Dillon Browne (1811–1850), Irish politician

== Sports ==
- Bobby Browne (footballer, born 1912) (1912–1994), Irish footballer
- Bobby Browne (footballer, born 1962), Irish footballer
- Robert Browne (cricketer) (1863–?), Barbadian cricketer

== Actors ==
- Robert Alan Browne (1932–2018), American actor
- Robert Browne (Elizabethan actor) (died 1603), English actor of the Elizabethan era; owner and manager of the Boar's Head Theatre
- Robert Browne (Jacobean actor) (1563–c. 1622), English actor, theatre manager and investor

== Others ==
- Robert Browne (musician) (21st century), Irish musician
- Robert Browne (bishop) (1844–1935), Roman Catholic bishop
- Robert Browne (priest) (1809–1895), English Anglican priest
- Robert Browne (Brownist) (1550–1633), founder of the Brownists
- Robert Charles Browne (born 1952), American serial killer
- Robert Gregory Browne (born 1955), American novelist and former screenwriter
- Robert Palmer Browne (1803–1872), British architect
- Robert Eric Charles Browne (1906–1975), Church of Ireland, later Church of England, clergyman and religious writer
- Robert S. Browne (1924–2004), economist

== See also ==
- Bob Browne (died 2011), British cartoonist and teacher
- Bob Brown (disambiguation)
- Rob Brown (disambiguation)
- Bobby Brown (disambiguation)
- Robert Brown (disambiguation)
- Browne, surname
