= Rob Brown =

Rob Brown may refer to:

- Rob Brown (musician), member of the UK electronic band Autechre
- Rob Brown (saxophonist) (born 1962), American free jazz saxophonist
- Rob Brown (ice hockey) (born 1968), Canadian ice hockey player
- Rob Brown (actor) (born 1984), American actor
- Rob Brown (journalist), Canadian reporter and anchor for CTV News

== See also ==
- Robert Brown (disambiguation)
- Bob Brown (disambiguation)
- Bobby Brown (disambiguation)
- Robby Brown (disambiguation)
- Robert Browne (disambiguation)
