= Dick Oxtoby =

English footballer (1939–2020)

Personal information
- Full name: Richard Oxtoby
- Date of birth: 5 September 1939
- Place of birth: Chesterfield, England
- Date of death: 22 June 2020 (aged 80)
- Positions: Centre half; full back

Senior career*
Years	Team	Apps	(Gls)
1955–1960	Bolton Wanderers	3	(0)
1961–1967	Tranmere Rovers	5	(0)
1967–1970	Runcorn		
1971–1973	Lancaster City		
Total		8	(0)

Managerial career
- 1975: Ashton United
- * Club domestic league appearances and goals

Dick Oxtoby (born 5 September 1939 - June 22, 2020) was an English footballer, who played as a centre half in the Football League for Bolton Wanderers and Tranmere Rovers.

He died in June 2020 at the age of 80.
