= Bobby Brown (footballer, born 1955) =

Scottish footballer

Personal information
- Date of birth: 23 November 1955 (age 70)
- Place of birth: Carluke, Scotland
- Position: Full back

Senior career*
Years	Team	Apps	(Gls)
1974–1977	Workington	44	(0)
1977–1980	Penrith		
1980–1981	Queen of the South	17	(0)
- Wigton
Total		61	(0)
- * Club domestic league appearances and goals

Bobby Brown (born 23 November 1955) is a Scottish former professional footballer who played as a full back.

== Career ==
Born in Carluke, Brown played for Workington, Penrith, Queen of the South and Wigton.

His father Bobby also played for Workington.
