= Robert W. Brown =

American artist (1917–2009)

- Born: Robert William Brown; July 12, 1917; San Francisco, California
- Died: October 17, 2009 (aged 92); Glendale, California
- Education: California College of the Arts
- Known for: Visual Art

Robert W. Brown (July 12, 1917 – October 17, 2009) was an American serigrapher, arts educator, glassmaker and ceramicist.

== Early life ==
Brown was born and raised in San Francisco and moved to Glendale, California, with his wife and young daughter in 1948, where he resided until his death. Brown obtained a Bachelor of Arts degree from San Francisco State College and Master of Fine Arts degrees from both the California College of the Arts and Crafts (later renamed California College of the Arts), and the University of Southern California.

== Post-educational career ==
From the 1940s to the 1980s, Brown produced a large body of serigraphic art. His serigraphs were notable for their bold and arresting use of color; they frequently won prizes and were shown in national graphic art exhibitions. These works explored a broad range of styles including figurative, abstract, and Op art.

From the 1950s until shortly before his death, Brown also worked as a glass artist. He created vivid and distinctive fused stained glass pieces, described by the Los Angeles Times in 1967 as "usually the center of attention" of exhibits. He also combined serigraphy and glassmaking, creating silkscreens on glass. He produced a significant rendering in stained glass of the Twelve Tribes of Israel for Temple Adat Ari El in North Hollywood, California, and glass panes for the entrance to the Glendale First United Methodist Church.

Brown was Professor of Fine Art at Glendale Community College from 1948 to 1983, focusing on life drawing and ceramics. He also taught printmaking and other art disciplines.

The Associates of Brand Library & Art Center bestowed their 1975 Purchase Award on Brown's "Suburb" and the 1977 Purchase Award on his "Opposite but Equal". This award is given in conjunction with the Brand National Annual Juried Art Exhibition.

After Brown's retirement from teaching, he focused much of his energy on glassmaking.

In 2009, Brown's daughter Jan Reilly donated the work remaining in his art studio to the Associates of Brand Library & Art Center.
