= Robert C. Brown (engineer) =

American mechanical engineer

Robert C. Brown is an American mechanical engineer.

Brown obtained a bachelor of arts in mathematics and a bachelor of science in physics at the University of Missouri in 1976. He then pursued a master's of science and doctorate in mechanical engineering at Michigan State University, which he completed in 1977 and 1980, respectively. Brown held the Bergles Professorship in Thermal Science within Iowa State University's Department of Mechanical Engineering from 2003 to 2008, when he was elevated to the Anson Marston Distinguished Professor in Engineering and the Gary and Donna Hoover Chair in Mechanical Engineering. Brown is also associated with ISU's BioCentury Research Farm.

Brown was elected a fellow of the American Society of Mechanical Engineers in 2002, and a fellow of the National Academy of Inventors in 2023. In 2025, he was elected to the National Academy of Engineering.
