= Dennis White (footballer) =

English footballer (1948–2019)

Personal information
- Date of birth: 10 November 1948
- Place of birth: Hartlepool, England
- Date of death: 19 June 2019 (aged 70)
- Position: Full back

Senior career*
Years	Team	Apps	(Gls)
1967–1973	Hartlepool	58	(0)
- South Shields
- Bishop Auckland
- * Club domestic league appearances and goals

Dennis White (10 November 1948 – 19 June 2019) was an English professional footballer who played as a full back.

== Career ==
Born in Hartlepool, White played for Hartlepool, South Shields and Bishop Auckland.

== Later life and death ==
White was married with two daughters. He died on 19 June 2019 at the age of 70.
