= Robert Brown (Minnesota politician) =

American politician (1935–2020)

Member of the Minnesota Senate
- In office 1967–1972

Personal details
- Born: June 15, 1935 Stillwater, Minnesota, U.S.
- Died: November 14, 2020 (aged 85) Roseville, Minnesota, U.S.
- Party: Republican
- Children: 7
- Education: Winona State University (BS); University of Minnesota (MA, PhD)

Robert J. Brown (June 15, 1935 – November 14, 2020) was an American educator and politician.

== Early life and education ==
Brown was born in Stillwater, Minnesota, and attended Stillwater Area Public Schools. He earned a Bachelor of Science degree in mathematics and speech from Winona State University, followed by a Master of Arts in educational administration and psychology and PhD from University of Minnesota.

== Career ==
Brown taught mathematics and physics at the Farmington Senior High, in Farmington, Minnesota, and at the Simley High School in Inver Grove Heights, Minnesota. He was a counselor and a track coach at both high schools. He then taught educational leadership at the University of St. Thomas. Brown served in the Minnesota Senate from 1967 to 1976 and was a Republican.

== Personal life ==
Brown died at his home in Roseville, Minnesota.
