= Fred Smith (footballer, born 1942) =

English footballer (1942–2020)

Personal information
- Full name: Frederick Gregg Smith
- Date of birth: 25 December 1942
- Place of birth: West Sleekburn, England
- Date of death: 26 March 2020 (aged 77)
- Position: Full back

Youth career
- 1959–1963: Burnley

Senior career*
Years	Team	Apps	(Gls)
1963–1970	Burnley	84	(1)
1970–1973	Portsmouth	81	(1)
1973–1974	Dallas Tornado	15	(0)
1974–1975	Halifax Town	3	(0)
- * Club domestic league appearances and goals

Frederick Gregg Smith (25 December 1942 – 26 March 2020) was an English footballer who played at full back for Burnley and Portsmouth, in the 1960s and 1970s.

== Football career ==
In October 1968, Burnley were suffering from a loss of form, causing manager Harry Potts to call up several younger players to replace the under-performing first-choice eleven. Smith was called into the team to play West Ham United, winning 3–1. With only one change, the same eleven players went on to record eight successive victories in League and Cup matches, with John Murray scoring eight goals.

In February 2009, Smith was included (at No. 60) in the list of "100 Greatest Clarets".

At Portsmouth, Smith soon became a first team regular and was ever-present in 1971–72. Smith scored his only first-team goal for Portsmouth in a 6–3 victory over Fulham in October 1971.

Smith was with Dallas Tornado in the North American Soccer League during 1974, but did not make any appearances. Returning to England, he briefly played for Halifax Town.

He died in March 2020.
