= J. Robert Brown Jr. =

American law professor

Jay Brown is a law professor with specializations in corporations and corporate governance, business law, administrative law, and securities regulation. He currently teaches at the University of Denver Sturm College of Law.

== Education ==
Brown earned a B.A. in Government in 1978 from the College of William & Mary, a J.D. from University of Maryland School of Law in 1980, and an M.A. and a Ph.D. in Government from Georgetown University in 1984 and 1993 respectively. His dissertation topic was "International Cooperation and Reform of the Japanese Financial Markets."

== Career ==
After holding brief teaching positions at Franklin & Marshall College and Dickinson School of Law, Brown joined the University of Denver in 1988, teaching in the law school and, for a period, in the school of international affairs. He was awarded a Fulbright Scholarship in 1997 and spent six months at the Kazakhstan Institute of Management. From 2000 to 2004, he was an associate dean for academic affairs at the law school. In 2009, he was a visiting professor at UC Hastings Law School.

In August 2011, Brown commented on NPR about the SEC's destruction of documents related to dropped investigations. Brown was quoted as saying, "My initial take on this is it's a tempest in a teapot... What appears to be going on here is the SEC would look at a matter, decide not to bring a case and largely purge the file of documents."

== Publications ==
(not a comprehensive review of publications)

- "Corporate Governance". Sturm College of Law website link to TheRacetotheBottom.org, a student-faculty blog providing "an analysis of the laws and regulatory measures that govern today's corporations." Brown contributions to the blog include:

- Examinations of attorney fee shifting in corporate bylaws and IPOs e.g. "Fee Shifting in Derivative Suits and the Oklahoma Legislature" and "Fee Shifting Bylaws and the Smart & Final Stores IPO". Also, a review of executive-compensation clawback provisions still not promulgated under Dodd-Frank including a look back at the "tepid effort" under the earlier Sarbanes-Oxley. All posted during September 2014.
- "Business Roundtable v. SEC: The Necessary Course to Understand the Decision" and Part 1, Part 2 and Part 3 of "Shareholder Access and the Uneconomic Economic Analysis: Business Roundtable v. SEC", August 29-September 1, 2011
- "Book Review: Wang & Steinberg, Insider Trading, 3d Edition", August 18, 2011.
- "Gupta, the SEC and the Termination of the Administrative Proceeding", August 5, 2011, and others about Rajat Gupta's SEC proceedings in 2011
a/o 8/18/2011, Brown had a total of 35 entries on the blog archive going back to July 7, 2011, including also certain related news items like "Commissioner Casey Steps Down", August 6, 2011, about the SEC's Casey stepping down August 5.

- "Returning Fairness to Executive Compensation", North Dakota Law Review, Vol. 84 2009; abstract.
- "Opting Only In: Nexus of Contracts and Waiver of Liability Provisions," co-authored with Gopalan, 42 Indiana Law Review 285 (2009).
- "The SEC, Corporate Governance, and Shareholder Access to the Board Room", Utah Law Review 1339-91 (2008).
- "Of Empires, Independents and Captives: Law Blogging, Law Scholarship, and Law School Rankings", U Denver Legal Studies Research Paper No. 08-04 (2008); abstract.
- "Disclosure, Corporate Governance, the Securities and Exchange Commission and the Limits of Disclosure," 57 Catholic Law Review 45 (Fall 2007).
- "Disloyalty without Limits: 'Independent' Directors and the Elimination of the Duty of Loyalty", Kentucky Law Journal Vol. 95 (2006).
- Criticizing the critics: Sarbanes-Oxley and quack corporate governance", Marquette Law Review, 90:309-35 (2006).
- Brown, J. Robert Jr. and Allison Herren Lee, Esq., "The Neutral Assignment of Judges at the Court of Appeals", 78 Texas Law Review 1037 (April 2000); article summary at Sturm College of Law website.
- "The Great 'Fall': The Consequences of Repealing the Glass-Steagall Act", Stanford Journal of Law, Business & Finance 2:1 (Fall 1995) p. 129; table of contents listing.
- "Disruptive Technological Change and a Paradigm Shift in Board Composition", muconf.missouri.edu, n.d.
- Opening Japan's financial markets (London/New York: Routledge, 1994) ISBN 0-415-10844-6; catalog entry at National Library of Australia.
