= Jim Keers =

English footballer (1931–2020)

Personal information
- Full name: James Keers
- Date of birth: 10 December 1931
- Place of birth: Stanley, England
- Date of death: 27 April 2020 (aged 88)
- Position: Outside forward

Senior career*
Years	Team	Apps	(Gls)
- Evenwood Town
1951–1956	Darlington	73	(15)
- Annfield Plain
- * Club domestic league appearances and goals

James Keers (10 December 1931 – 27 April 2020) was an English footballer who scored 15 goals from 73 appearances in the Football League Third Division North playing on the wing for Darlington in the 1950s. He also played non-league football for clubs including Evenwood Town and Annfield Plain.
