= Alex Forsyth (footballer, born 1928) =

Scottish football (1928–2020)

Personal information
- Full name: Alexander Simpson Hutchinson Forsyth
- Date of birth: 29 September 1928
- Place of birth: Camelon, Scotland
- Date of death: 30 March 2020 (aged 91)
- Place of death: Falkirk, Scotland
- Position: Outside right

Senior career*
Years	Team	Apps	(Gls)
–	Linlithgow Rose		
1951–1952	Albion Rovers	14	(0)
1952–1953	Darlington	26	(7)
1953–1956	East Stirlingshire (Note: Appearance figures exclude East Stirlingshire's matches in the Scottish C Division between 1953 and 1955.)	20	(0)
- * Club domestic league appearances and goals

Alexander Simpson Hutchinson Forsyth (29 September 1928 – 30 March 2020) was a Scottish footballer who played in the Scottish Football League for Albion Rovers and East Stirlingshire and in the English Football League for Darlington in the 1950s. He also played junior football for Linlithgow Rose. After retiring as a player because of injury, he went on to work as chief scout for East Stirlingshire and later became a director of the club.

Forsyth died in Falkirk on 30 March 2020.
