= Robert Brown (archdeacon of Killala) =

Anglican priest

Robert Brown was an Anglican priest in Ireland. Educated at Trinity College, Dublin, Brown was Archdeacon of Killala from 1661 until 1673, and Prebendary of Killaraght in St. Crumnathy's Cathedral, Achonry from 1670 to 1673.
