= Bobby Smith (footballer, born 1941) =

English footballer (1941–2019)

Personal information
- Full name: Robert Smith
- Date of birth: 20 June 1941
- Place of birth: Barnsley, England
- Date of death: 16 August 2019 (aged 78)
- Place of death: Essex, England
- Positions: Left back; winger

Youth career
- Barnsley

Senior career*
Years	Team	Apps	(Gls)
1960–1963	Barnsley	3	(0)
1963–1973	Chelmsford City		
- Bexley United
- * Club domestic league appearances and goals

Robert Smith (20 June 1941 – 16 August 2019) was an English footballer who played as a left back and a winger.

== Career ==
Bobby Smith began his football career with his hometown club Barnsley, where he made three Football League appearances for the club. In 1963, Smith signed for non-league club Chelmsford City. During his ten-year tenure at the club, Smith made 443 appearances, establishing himself as a key player for Chelmsford. Smith later played for Bexley United, before re-joining Chelmsford as part of their coaching staff.
