= Bobby Brown (footballer, born 1887) =

English footballer (1887–?)

Personal information
- Full name: John Robert Brown
- Date of birth: November 1887
- Place of birth: South Bank, England
- Position: Full back

Senior career*
Years	Team	Apps	(Gls)
1906–1907	South Bank		
1907–1909	Middlesbrough	25	(0)
1909	Bristol City	3	(0)
1909	Warrenby Athletic		
Total		28	(0)
- * Club domestic league appearances and goals

John Robert Brown (born November 1887) was an English footballer who played as a defender in the Football League for Bristol City and Middlesbrough.
