= Bobby Brown (footballer, born 1931) =

Scottish footballer (1931–2019)

Personal information
- Full name: Robert Brown
- Date of birth: 2 December 1931
- Place of birth: Motherwell, Scotland
- Date of death: June 2019 (aged 87)
- Position: Full back

Senior career*
Years	Team	Apps	(Gls)
- Polkemmet Juniors
1952–1956	Motherwell	3	(0)
1956–1967	Workington	419	(2)
Total		422	(2)

Managerial career
- 1967: Workington
- * Club domestic league appearances and goals

Robert Brown (2 December 1931 – June 2019) was a Scottish professional footballer who played as a full back.

== Career ==
Born in Motherwell, Brown played for Polkemmet Juniors, Motherwell and Workington. Brown was Workington's record appearance holder, and made a total of 469 league and cup appearances for the club between 1956 and 1967. He also spent some time as player-coach.

His appearance record was beaten by Kyle May in 2015. His son Bobby also played for Workington. He died in June 2019, aged 87.
