= Community paper =

Publication to benefit a local community

Community paper is a term used by publishers, advertisers and readers to describe a range of publications that share a common service to their local community and commerce. Their predominant medium being newsprint, often free and published at regular weekly or monthly intervals, Community Papers are distinguished by their demonstrable levels of local engagement, rather than by the scope of their content. While Merriam-Webster and other dictionaries have yet to define Community Paper, the term has long been incorporated into the actual name of six state, five regional and one national trade association of hometown publishers of passing events, both general and commercial. While the diverse composition of their membership may cast a wide tent over the term, all Community Papers have a Nameplate, bear a Masthead, are fixed in print and dated by edition, are published at regular intervals, and are archived internally at a minimum. Whether a specific Community Paper might more resemble a Shopper or a Newspaper, all such local papers fit the dictionary definition of Publication and Periodical, and are clearly distinguished from Flyers, Handbills and Circulars which are printed, usually at sporadic intervals, and serve a limited, often singular commercial interest.

== History ==
While free community papers may have complicated Professor Pollard's quest to craft the ultimate description of "legitimate newspaper," their emergence becoming increasingly common with the establishment of Third Class Mails in 1928, the explosive growth and real birth of an industry came after his exercise in publishing segregation. Less than half a decade hence, notes free paper publishing pioneer Victor Jose in his treatise on the industry, the wave of returning veterans of World War Two came home to plant publishing flags in their own hometowns, in service to the obvious communications needs and giving rise to free community papers for all. By the late 1990s, the trade associations representing free community paper publishers began their universal embrace of independent audits of circulation, and soon into the new century the industry was governed by the strict standards and scrutiny of Circulation Verification Council). Today, the weekly, audited reach of free community papers exceeds 65,000,000 according to the collaborative initiative, PaperChain).

== See also ==
- Community journalism
- Community newspapers in Hollywood, California
