= Bob Brown (newspaper publisher) =

Newspaper publisher and editor

Robert Lloyd "Bob" Brown (1930 – June 8, 1984) was an American publisher of the Las Vegas Valley Times from 1973 to 1984. Prior to this, he had served as a correspondent in Asia for the United Press and as a journalist in Alaska and Arkansas. He was also editor of the Las Vegas Review-Journal, a speech-writer for Paul Laxalt, editor of the Tucson Daily American, editor and publisher of the Lacey Leader (in Washington state) and chairman of the Nevada State Tax Commission.

== Valley Times ==
On November 1, Brown purchased the Valley Times through his newly formed Las Vegas Valley Publishing Company. He then hired longtime Las Vegas journalists A.D. Hopkins and Bruce Hasley to lead his staff. The Valley Times aimed to cover the gaming industry heavily, viewing it as the political and business core of the Vegas community. Brown hired reporters to dig deep into the industry and top reporter Ned Day uncovered mob connections at the Argent-owned casinos of Stardust, Fremont, and Hacienda, which were run by Frank Rosenthal. He also uncovered Kansas City-based mob connections at Tropicana. Under Brown's leadership, the Valley Times became a "must read" for politicians and the gaming industry, despite its circulation being dwarfed by Las Vegas' other two daily papers.

During the 1970s, the Valley Times entered into financial trouble. In an effort to keep the paper afloat, Brown sold his credibility to the mob. According to a 1979 expose by the Reno Evening Gazette, Brown switched the paper's editorial position in 1976 from criticizing the state government for not being hard enough on Rosenthal to supporting him. Governor Robert List accused Brown of attempting to extort him by promising to withhold unfavorable stories in exchange for a gaming license for Rosenthal. Brown denied the charge and List declined to aid the FBI in investigating the accusation. Brown also became involved in a fake advertising scheme that allowed Argent to launder money from its casinos back to the Chicago mob. Brown admit his involvement in the scheme, saying he participated to keep his paper in business. He later testified against ad man Jerry May who organized the scheme, and the prosecutor of the case called Brown "a pillar of the community."

Brown stopped paying payroll taxes. By July 1982, the paper owed $200,000 in back taxes and the IRS seized control of Times assets, including its buildings and printing presses. In 1983, Brown pleaded guilty to filing a false tax return in 1976 and underreporting both personal and corporate income in 1976 and 1977. Although he won the paper's assets back in court, Brown was not able to turn around the struggling business before his death.

== Death and legacy ==
Brown died on June 8, 1984. The U.S. Bankruptcy Court trustee closed the Valley Times two weeks later, with the final issue being published on June 22.

Stan Hunterton, who prosecuted the Argent mob case, remarked in 1984 that Brown "has devoted a large measure of his life to the public affairs of this state when any number of other pursuits would have been easier and more financially rewarding." Writing for the Las Vegas Review-Journal in 2013, reporter Jane Ann Morrison reminisced, "Brown was one of those newsmen praised even today as lovable and a magnificent journalist."
