= 2019–20 UEFA Youth League Domestic Champions Path =

European club football tournament

The 2019–20 UEFA Youth League Domestic Champions Path began on 2 October and ended on 4 December 2019. A total of 32 teams compete in the Domestic Champions Path to decide eight of the 24 places in the knockout phase (play-offs and the round of 16 onwards) of the 2019–20 UEFA Youth League.

Times are CET/CEST, (Note: CEST (UTC+2) for dates up to 26 October 2019 (first round), and CET (UTC+1) for dates thereafter (second round).) as listed by UEFA (local times, if different, are in parentheses).

== Draw ==
The youth domestic champions of the top 32 associations according to their 2018 UEFA country coefficients entered the Domestic Champions Path. If there was a vacancy (associations with no youth domestic competition, as well as youth domestic champions already included in the UEFA Champions League path), it was first filled by the title holders should they have not yet qualified, and then by the youth domestic champions of the next association in the UEFA ranking.

For the Domestic Champions Path, the 32 teams were drawn into two rounds of two-legged home-and-away ties. The draw for both the first round and second round was held on 3 September 2019, 14:00 CEST, at the UEFA headquarters in Nyon, Switzerland. There were no seedings, but the 32 teams were split into groups defined by sporting and geographical criteria prior to the draw.

- In the first round, the 32 teams were split into four groups. Teams in the same group were drawn against each other, with the order of legs decided by draw.
- In the second round, the sixteen winners of the first round, whose identity was not known at the time of the draw, were split into two groups: Group A contained the winners from Groups 1 and 2, while Group B contained the winners from Groups 3 and 4. Teams in the same group were drawn against each other, with the order of legs decided by draw.

Key to colours
Second round winners advanced to the play-offs

Group 1 Team (Spain) Zaragoza (Cyprus) APOEL (Poland) Korona Kielce (Azerbaijan) Gabala (Moldova) Sheriff Tiraspol (Albania) Shkëndija Tiranë (Hungary) MTK Budapest (Bosnia and Herzegovina) Zrinjski Mostar	Group 2 Team (England) Derby County (Denmark) Midtjylland (Sweden) IF Elfsborg (Belarus) Minsk (Norway) Sogndal (Iceland) ÍA (Finland) Honka (Estonia) FCI Levadia	Group 3 Team (France) Rennes (Portugal) Porto (Switzerland) Young Boys (Greece) PAOK (Serbia) Brodarac (Scotland) Rangers (Republic of Ireland) Bohemians (Latvia) Liepāja	Group 4 Team (Ukraine) Dynamo Kyiv (Israel) Maccabi Petah Tikva (Romania) Viitorul Constanța (Bulgaria) Ludogorets Razgrad (Kazakhstan) Astana (Slovenia) Domžale (Slovakia) Slovan Bratislava (North Macedonia) Shkëndija

== Format ==
In both rounds, if the aggregate score was tied after full time of the second leg, the away goals rule was used to decide the winner. If still tied, the match was decided by a penalty shoot-out (no extra time was played). The eight second round winners advanced to the play-offs, where they were joined by the eight group runners-up from the UEFA Champions League Path (group stage).

== First round ==
=== Summary ===
The first legs were played on 2, 3, 5 and 9 October, and the second legs were played from 22–24 October 2019.

Team 1	Agg.	Team 2	1st leg	2nd leg
APOEL (Cyprus)	2–1 (Note: Order of legs reversed after original draw.)	(Azerbaijan) Gabala	1–1	1–0
Shkëndija Tiranë (Albania)	1–3	(Moldova) Sheriff Tiraspol	1–2	0–1
MTK Budapest (Hungary)	1–3	(Bosnia and Herzegovina) Zrinjski Mostar	1–1	0–2
Zaragoza (Spain)	5–1	(Poland) Korona Kielce	1–0	4–1
Minsk (Belarus)	2–9	(England) Derby County	0–2	2–7
IF Elfsborg (Sweden)	1–3	(Denmark) Midtjylland	1–2	0–1
Sogndal (Norway)	4–2	(Finland) Honka	3–1	1–1
ÍA (Iceland)	16–1	(Estonia) FCI Levadia	4–0	12–1
Bohemians (Republic of Ireland)	1–2	(Greece) PAOK	1–1	0–1
Rennes (France)	2–1	(Serbia) Brodarac	2–1	0–0
Young Boys (Switzerland)	5–5 (a)	(Scotland) Rangers	3–3	2–2
Porto (Portugal)	7–2	(Latvia) Liepāja	4–2	3–0
Viitorul Constanța (Romania)	0–2	(Slovenia) Domžale	0–0	0–2
Slovan Bratislava (Slovakia)	1–1 (4–2 p)	(Bulgaria) Ludogorets Razgrad	1–0	0–1
Dynamo Kyiv (Ukraine)	10–2	(North Macedonia) Shkëndija	8–0	2–2
Astana (Kazakhstan)	1–4	(Israel) Maccabi Petah Tikva	1–0	0–4

=== Matches ===
2 October 2019
16:00 (17:00 UTC+3)

APOEL (Cyprus)	1–1	(Azerbaijan) Gabala
Gavriel 48'	Report	Satsias 9' (o.g.)

Makario Stadium, Nicosia
Attendance: 500
Referee: Furkat Atazhanov (Kazakhstan)
24 October 2019
12:00 (14:00 UTC+4)

Gabala (Azerbaijan)	0–1	(Cyprus) APOEL
	Report	Hadjiyiannis 55'

Gabala City Stadium, Qabala
Attendance: 1,200
Referee: Denys Shurman (Ukraine)

APOEL won 2–1 on aggregate.

2 October 2019
14:30

Shkëndija Tiranë (Albania)	1–2	(Moldova) Sheriff Tiraspol
Ajazi 11'	Report	Danilov 21', 45+2'

Elbasan Arena, Elbasan
Attendance: 350
Referee: Zaven Hovhannisyan (Armenia)
23 October 2019
17:00 (18:00 UTC+3)

Sheriff Tiraspol (Moldova)	1–0	(Albania) Shkëndija Tiranë
Gaiu 32'	Report

Sheriff Small Arena, Tiraspol
Attendance: 1,019
Referee: Matthew De Gabriele (Malta)

Sheriff Tiraspol won 3–1 on aggregate.

2 October 2019
18:00

MTK Budapest (Hungary)	1–1	(Bosnia and Herzegovina) Zrinjski Mostar
Kata 79'	Report	Ramljak 52'

Hidegkuti Nándor Stadion, Budapest
Attendance: 1,000
Referee: Bram Van Driessche (Belgium)
23 October 2019
14:30

Zrinjski Mostar (Bosnia and Herzegovina)	2–0	(Hungary) MTK Budapest
Kurbaša 24'; Čoko 48'	Report

Stadion pod Bijelim Brijegom, Mostar
Attendance: 744
Referee: Christopher Jaeger (Austria)

Zrinjski Mostar won 3–1 on aggregate.

9 October 2019
17:00

Zaragoza (Spain)	1–0	(Poland) Korona Kielce
Borge 43'	Report

La Romareda, Zaragoza
Attendance: 7,562
Referee: Kristoffer Karlsson (Sweden)
23 October 2019
16:00

Korona Kielce (Poland)	1–4	(Spain) Zaragoza
Lisowski 27'	Report	Azón 42', 66'; Vela 88'; Castillo 90+3'

Kielce City Stadium, Kielce
Attendance: 6,250
Referee: Balázs Berke (Hungary)

Zaragoza won 5–1 on aggregate.

2 October 2019
15:00 (16:00 UTC+3)

Minsk (Belarus)	0–2	(England) Derby County
	Report	Whittaker 22' (pen.), 88'

FC Minsk Stadium, Minsk
Attendance: 500
Referee: Novak Simović (Serbia)
22 October 2019
20:00 (19:00 UTC+1)

Derby County (England)	7–2	(Belarus) Minsk
A. Brown 4', 26'; Stretton 16', 40'; Whittaker 27', 72', 77' (pen.)	Report	Zherdev 48'; Vorobyev 65'

Loughborough University Stadium, Loughborough
Attendance: 262
Referee: Kristoffer Hagenes (Norway)

Derby County won 9–2 on aggregate.

2 October 2019
18:30

IF Elfsborg (Sweden)	1–2	(Denmark) Midtjylland
Iljazi 77'	Report	Simsir 21'; Hansen 45'

Borås Arena, Borås
Attendance: 475
Referee: Dejan Jakimovski (North Macedonia)
23 October 2019
18:30

Midtjylland (Denmark)	1–0	(Sweden) IF Elfsborg
Sørensen 82'	Report

MCH Arena, Herning
Attendance: 1,032
Referee: Manfredas Lukjancukas (Lithuania)

Midtjylland won 3–1 on aggregate.

2 October 2019
18:30

Sogndal (Norway)	3–1	(Finland) Honka
Sundberg 42'; Nord 45+1'; Halset 69'	Report	Salin 38'

Fosshaugane Campus, Sogndalsfjøra
Attendance: 799
Referee: Besfort Kasumi (Kosovo)
24 October 2019
17:30 (18:30 UTC+3)

Honka (Finland)	1–1	(Norway) Sogndal
Camara 38'	Report	Solberg 17'

Telia 5G -areena, Helsinki
Attendance: 371
Referee: Alex Troleis (Faroe Islands)

Sogndal won 4–2 on aggregate.

2 October 2019
18:00 (16:00 UTC+0)

ÍA (Iceland)	4–0	(Estonia) FCI Levadia
Þorsteinsson 22', 86' (pen.); Theodórsson 49'; Pálsson 70'	Report

Akranesvöllur, Akranes
Attendance: 0
Referee: Kári Jóannesarson Á Høvdanum (Faroe Islands)
23 October 2019
16:30 (17:30 UTC+3)

FCI Levadia (Estonia)	1–12	(Iceland) ÍA
Gíslason 86' (o.g.)	Report	Wöhler 1', 7', 30', 31'; Unnarsson 13', 62', 65'; Þorsteinsson 20' (pen.); Gylfason 63'; Guðjónsson 77'; Aðalgeirsson 85'; Pálsson 88'

Sportland Arena, Tallinn
Attendance: 150
Referee: Kaarlo Oskari Hämäläinen (Finland)

ÍA won 16–1 on aggregate.

2 October 2019
20:30 (19:30 UTC+1)

Bohemians (Republic of Ireland)	1–1	(Greece) PAOK
Moylan 6'	Report	Gaitanidis 10'

Dalymount Park, Dublin
Attendance: 1,227
Referee: Robert Ian Jenkins (Wales)
23 October 2019
17:00 (18:00 UTC+3)

PAOK (Greece)	1–0	(Republic of Ireland) Bohemians
Panidis 50'	Report

Toumba Stadium, Thessaloniki
Attendance: 2,038
Referee: Gal Leibovitz (Israel)

PAOK won 2–1 on aggregate.

2 October 2019
17:00

Rennes (France)	2–1	(Serbia) Brodarac
Picouleau 85'; Rivollier 90+6'	Report	Ilić 41'

Stade de la Piverdière Nord 1, Rennes
Attendance: 815
Referee: Kai Erik Steen (Norway)
23 October 2019
17:00

Brodarac (Serbia)	0–0	(France) Rennes
	Report

Sports Center of FA of Serbia, Stara Pazova
Attendance: 1,400
Referee: Dragan Petrovic (Bosnia and Herzegovina)

Rennes won 2–1 on aggregate.

3 October 2019
14:00

Young Boys (Switzerland)	3–3	(Scotland) Rangers
Kasongo 49'; Eberhard 75'; De Donno 90+2'	Report	Patterson 12'; Finlayson 53'; Dickson 57'

Sportpark Wyler, Bern
Attendance: 620
Referee: Emmanouil Skoulas (Greece)
23 October 2019
20:00 (19:00 UTC+1)

Rangers (Scotland)	2–2	(Switzerland) Young Boys
Young-Coombes 40'; Finlayson 81'	Report	Maier 28', 44'

Firhill Stadium, Glasgow
Attendance: 970
Referee: Erik Lambrechts (Belgium)

5–5 on aggregate; Rangers won on away goals.

2 October 2019
16:00 (15:00 UTC+1)

Porto (Portugal)	4–2	(Latvia) Liepāja
Borges 7'; Vieira 57'; Sousa 60'; Ferreira 63' (pen.)	Report	Riekstiņš 77'; Ziemelis 87' (pen.)

CTFD PortoGaia, Vila Nova de Gaia
Attendance: 357
Referee: Keith Kennedy (Northern Ireland)
23 October 2019
17:00 (18:00 UTC+3)

Liepāja (Latvia)	0–3	(Portugal) Porto
	Report	Sousa 28', 70'; Vieira 78' (pen.)

Daugava Stadium, Liepāja
Attendance: 527
Referee: Rahim Hasanov (Azerbaijan)

Porto won 7–2 on aggregate.

2 October 2019
17:00 (18:00 UTC+3)

Viitorul Constanța (Romania)	0–0	(Slovenia) Domžale
	Report

Stadionul Viitorul, Ovidiu
Attendance: 1,544
Referee: Fyodor Zammit (Malta)
22 October 2019
18:00

Domžale (Slovenia)	2–0	(Romania) Viitorul Constanța
Svetlin 3'; Pantelić 41'	Report

Domžale Sports Park, Domžale
Attendance: 2,013
Referee: Nikola Popov (Bulgaria)

Domžale won 2–0 on aggregate.

2 October 2019
18:00

Slovan Bratislava (Slovakia)	1–0	(Bulgaria) Ludogorets Razgrad
Potoma 50'	Report

Tehelné pole, Bratislava
Attendance: 1,064
Referee: Nikolas Neokleous (Cyprus)
23 October 2019
17:00 (18:00 UTC+3)

Ludogorets Razgrad (Bulgaria)	1–0	(Slovakia) Slovan Bratislava
Minkov 31'	Report
Penalties
Minkov (penalty scored); A. Ganchev (penalty missed); Babaliev (penalty scored); Budinov (penalty missed)	2–4	(penalty scored) Lichý; (penalty scored) Habodasz; (penalty scored) Dohnanský; (penalty scored) Potoma

PFC Ludogorets 1945 Training Centre, Razgrad
Attendance: 725
Referee: Laurent Kopriwa (Luxembourg)

1–1 on aggregate; Slovan Bratislava won 4–2 on penalties.

2 October 2019
16:00 (17:00 UTC+3)

Dynamo Kyiv (Ukraine)	8–0	(North Macedonia) Shkëndija
Vanat 2' (pen.), 51'; Nadolskyi 13', 41'; Voloshyn 25', 75'; Shulyanskyi 56'; Isayenko 90+6' (pen.)	Report

Valeriy Lobanovskyi Dynamo Stadium, Kyiv
Attendance: 3,862
Referee: Rauf Jabarov (Azerbaijan)
23 October 2019
14:30

Shkëndija (North Macedonia)	2–2	(Ukraine) Dynamo Kyiv
Gashi 25'; Spahiu 90+3'	Report	Amzai 52' (o.g.); Voloshyn 90' (pen.)

Petar Miloševski Training Centre, Skopje
Attendance: 144
Referee: Eldorjan Hamiti (Albania)

Dynamo Kyiv won 10–2 on aggregate.

5 October 2019
11:00 (15:00 UTC+6)

Astana (Kazakhstan)	1–0	(Israel) Maccabi Petah Tikva
Basmanov 10'	Report

Astana Arena, Nur-Sultan
Attendance: 700
Referee: Aleksandrs Golubevs (Latvia)
23 October 2019
18:00 (19:00 UTC+3)

Maccabi Petah Tikva (Israel)	4–0	(Kazakhstan) Astana
Blorian 17'; Abada 39', 82'; Bader 65'	Report

HaMoshava Stadium, Petah Tikva
Attendance: 500
Referee: Volen Chinkov (Bulgaria)

Maccabi Petah Tikva won 4–1 on aggregate.

== Second round ==
=== Summary ===
The first legs were played on 4 and 6 November, and the second legs were played from 26–27 November and 4 December 2019.

Team 1	Agg.	Team 2	1st leg	2nd leg
Sheriff Tiraspol (Moldova)	3–3 (a)	(Norway) Sogndal	2–0	1–3
Zaragoza (Spain)	9–0	(Cyprus) APOEL	5–0	4–0
Midtjylland (Denmark)	3–1	(Bosnia and Herzegovina) Zrinjski Mostar	3–1	0–0
ÍA (Iceland)	2–6	(England) Derby County	1–2	1–4
Porto (Portugal)	5–2	(Slovenia) Domžale	2–2	3–0
Dynamo Kyiv (Ukraine)	5–2	(Greece) PAOK	3–0	2–2
Rangers (Scotland)	4–1	(Slovakia) Slovan Bratislava	2–0	2–1
Rennes (France)	3–0	(Israel) Maccabi Petah Tikva	2–0	1–0

=== Matches ===
6 November 2019
17:00 (18:00 UTC+2)

Sheriff Tiraspol (Moldova)	2–0	(Norway) Sogndal
Covali 31'; Gliga 75'	Report

Sheriff Small Arena, Tiraspol
Attendance: 1,501
Referee: Yigal Frid (Israel)
27 November 2019
18:00

Sogndal (Norway)	3–1	(Moldova) Sheriff Tiraspol
Sundberg 16'; Mannsverk 31'; Solberg 69' (pen.)	Report	Ojehovschii 66'

Fosshaugane Campus, Sogndalsfjøra
Attendance: 511
Referee: Ivar Orri Kristjansson (Iceland)

3–3 on aggregate; Sheriff Tiraspol won on away goals.

6 November 2019
17:00

Zaragoza (Spain)	5–0	(Cyprus) APOEL
Carbonell 8' (pen.), 22', 66' (pen.); Vela 45+1'; Marín 90+2'	Report

La Romareda, Zaragoza
Attendance: 4,012
Referee: Julian Weinberger (Austria)
27 November 2019
16:00 (17:00 UTC+2)

APOEL (Cyprus)	0–4	(Spain) Zaragoza
	Report	Hernández 16'; Jiménez 24'; Castillo 45+2'; Conte 57'

Makario Stadium, Nicosia
Attendance: 170
Referee: Juxhin Xhaja (Albania)

Zaragoza won 9–0 on aggregate.

4 November 2019
14:00

Midtjylland (Denmark)	3–1	(Bosnia and Herzegovina) Zrinjski Mostar
Sørensen 15'; Hansen 60'; Isaksen 81'	Report	Tuka 87'

MCH Arena, Herning
Attendance: 610
Referee: Kaspar Sjöberg (Sweden)
26 November 2019
13:30

Zrinjski Mostar (Bosnia and Herzegovina)	0–0	(Denmark) Midtjylland
	Report

Stadion pod Bijelim Brijegom, Mostar
Attendance: 550
Referee: Vitaliy Romanov (Ukraine)

Midtjylland won 3–1 on aggregate.

6 November 2019
20:00 (19:00 UTC+0)

ÍA (Iceland)	1–2	(England) Derby County
Ingason 72'	Report	Ebosele 16'; Stretton 39'

Víkingsvöllur, Reykjavík
Attendance: 355
Referee: Lionel Tschudi (Switzerland)
27 November 2019
20:00 (19:00 UTC+0)

Derby County (England)	4–1	(Iceland) ÍA
Knight 12', 42'; Stretton 20'; A. Brown 63'	Report	Þorsteinsson 71' (pen.)

Pride Park Stadium, Derby
Attendance: 400
Referee: Tim Marshall (Northern Ireland)

Derby County won 6–2 on aggregate.

6 November 2019
16:00 (15:00 UTC+0)

Porto (Portugal)	2–2	(Slovenia) Domžale
Moreira 78'; Esteves 90+4'	Report	Svetlin 62' (pen.); Pišek 90+8'

CTFD PortoGaia, Vila Nova de Gaia
Attendance: 211
Referee: Nicolas Laforge (Belgium)
27 November 2019
17:00

Domžale (Slovenia)	0–3	(Portugal) Porto
	Report	Sousa 6'; Valente 77'; Moreira 82'

Domžale Sports Park, Domžale
Attendance: 2,089
Referee: Anastasios Papapetrou (Greece)

Porto won 5–2 on aggregate.

6 November 2019
16:00 (17:00 UTC+2)

Dynamo Kyiv (Ukraine)	3–0	(Greece) PAOK
Tsitaishvili 10' (pen.), 45+1' (pen.); Nadolskyi 76'	Report

Valeriy Lobanovskyi Dynamo Stadium, Kyiv
Attendance: 1,904
Referee: Milovan Milacic (Montenegro)
27 November 2019
16:00 (17:00 UTC+2)

PAOK (Greece)	2–2	(Ukraine) Dynamo Kyiv
Doumtsis 14' (pen.); Tzolis 22'	Report	Isayenko 90+3'; Yarosh 90+6'

Toumba Stadium, Thessaloniki
Attendance: 1,000
Referee: Novak Simović (Serbia)

Dynamo Kyiv won 5–2 on aggregate.

6 November 2019
20:00 (19:00 UTC+0)

Rangers (Scotland)	2–0	(Slovakia) Slovan Bratislava
Mebude 28'; Young-Coombes 51'	Report

Firhill Stadium, Glasgow
Attendance: 919
Referee: Rohit Saggi (Norway)
27 November 2019
17:00

Slovan Bratislava (Slovakia)	1–2	(Scotland) Rangers
Tóth 34'	Report	Young-Coombes 45+2', 53'

Štadión Pasienky, Bratislava
Attendance: 930
Referee: Pavel Orel (Czech Republic)

Rangers won 4–1 on aggregate.

6 November 2019
18:00

Rennes (France)	2–0	(Israel) Maccabi Petah Tikva
Boey 43' (pen.); Waflart 85'	Report

Stade de la Piverdière Nord 1, Rennes
Attendance: 750
Referee: Genc Nuza (Kosovo)
4 December 2019
14:00 (15:00 UTC+2)

Maccabi Petah Tikva (Israel)	0–1	(France) Rennes
	Report	Rutter 61'

HaMoshava Stadium, Petah Tikva
Attendance: 450
Referee: Nikolas Neokleous (Cyprus)

Rennes won 3–0 on aggregate.
