= 2019–20 UEFA Champions League =

European football tournament

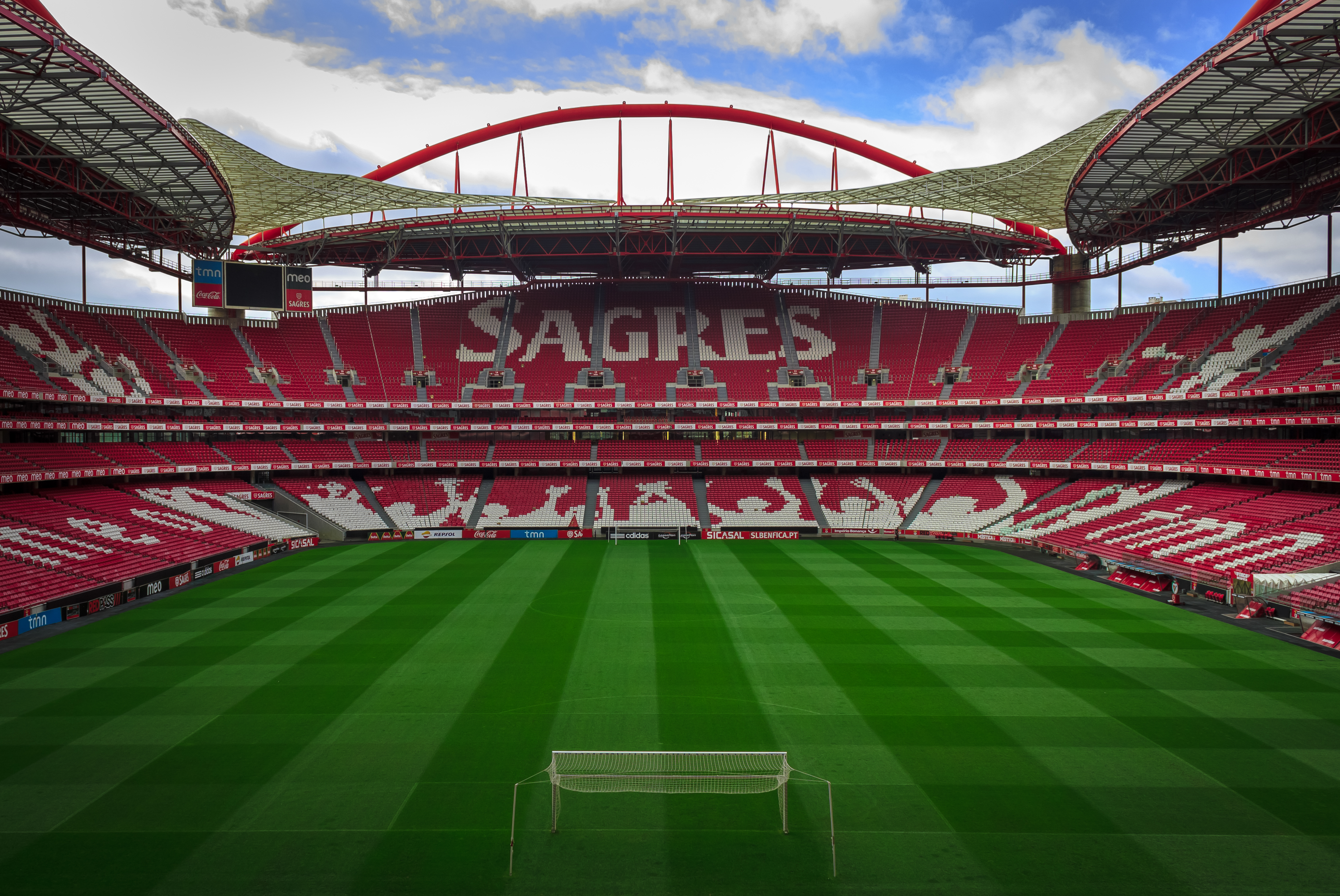
- The Estádio da Luz in Lisbon hosted the final

Tournament details
- Dates: Qualifying: 25 June – 28 August 2019; Competition proper: 17 September 2019 – 23 August 2020
- Teams: Competition proper: 32; Total: 79 (from 54 associations)

Final positions
- Champions: (Germany) Bayern Munich (6th title)
- Runners-up: (France) Paris Saint-Germain

Tournament statistics
- Matches played: 119
- Goals scored: 386 (3.24 per match)
- Attendance: 4,758,398 (39,987 per match)
- Top scorer(s): Robert Lewandowski (Bayern Munich); 15 goals
- Best players: Goalkeeper: Manuel Neuer (Bayern Munich); Defender: Joshua Kimmich (Bayern Munich); Midfielder: Kevin De Bruyne (Manchester City); Forward: Robert Lewandowski (Bayern Munich)

The 2019–20 UEFA Champions League was the 65th season of Europe's premier club football tournament organised by UEFA, and the 28th season since it was renamed from the European Champion Clubs' Cup to the UEFA Champions League.

Bayern Munich defeated Paris Saint-Germain in the final, played at the Estádio da Luz in Lisbon, Portugal, 1–0 and became the first European Cup winners to win all their matches during the tournament. In addition, the Germans secured their second continental treble, becoming only the second European club to do so, and became the first team to claim any European competition with a 100% winning record. As winners, they earned the right to play against Sevilla, the winners of the 2019–20 UEFA Europa League, in the 2020 UEFA Super Cup, and also qualified for the 2020 FIFA Club World Cup in Qatar. They would go on to win both competitions. Since they had already qualified for the 2020–21 UEFA Champions League group stage through their league performance, the berth originally reserved for the Champions League title holders was given to the team that was top of the 2019–20 Eredivisie (Ajax), the 11th-ranked association according to next season's access list, when it was suspended due to the COVID-19 pandemic.

Due to the impact of the COVID-19 pandemic, the tournament was suspended in mid-March 2020 and resumed in August. The quarter-finals onwards were played as single-match knockout ties at neutral venues in Lisbon, Portugal (Estádio da Luz and Estádio José Alvalade) behind closed doors from 12 to 23 August. In keeping with its introduction the campaign prior, the video assistant referee (VAR) system was in use from the play-off round onwards.

Liverpool were the defending champions, but were eliminated in the round of 16 by Atlético Madrid.

== Association team allocation ==
A total of 79 teams from 54 of the 55 UEFA member associations participated in the 2019–20 UEFA Champions League (the exception being Liechtenstein, which did not organise a domestic league). The association ranking based on the UEFA country coefficients was used to determine the number of participating teams for each association:

- Associations 1–4 each had four teams qualify.
- Associations 5–6 each had three teams qualify.
- Associations 7–15 each had two teams qualify.
- Associations 16–55 (except Liechtenstein) each had one team qualify.
- The winners of the 2018–19 UEFA Champions League and 2018–19 UEFA Europa League were each given an additional entry if they did not qualify for the 2019–20 UEFA Champions League through their domestic leagues. However, both qualified through their domestic leagues, meaning the additional entries were not necessary.

=== Association ranking ===
For the 2019–20 UEFA Champions League, the associations were allocated places according to their 2018 UEFA country coefficients, which took into account their performance in European competitions from 2013–14 to 2017–18.

Apart from the allocation based on the country coefficients, associations could have additional teams participating in the Champions League, as noted below:

- (UCL) – Additional berth for UEFA Champions League title holders
- (UEL) – Additional berth for UEFA Europa League title holders

Association ranking for 2019–20 UEFA Champions League

Rank	Association	Coeff.	Teams	Notes
1	Spain	106.998	4	
2	England	79.605	4	
3	Italy	76.249	4	
4	Germany	71.427	4	
5	France	56.415	3	
6	Russia	53.382	3	
7	Portugal	47.248	2	
8	Ukraine	41.133	2	
9	Belgium	38.500	2	
10	Turkey	35.800	2	
11	Austria	32.850	2	
12	Switzerland	30.200	2	
13	Czech Republic	30.175	2	
14	Netherlands	29.749	2	
15	Greece	28.600	2	
16	Croatia	26.000	1	
17	Denmark	25.950	1	
18	Israel	21.750	1	
19	Cyprus	21.550	1	

Rank	Association	Coeff.	Teams	Notes
20	Romania	20.450	1	
21	Poland	20.125	1	
22	Sweden	19.975	1	
23	Azerbaijan	19.125	1	
24	Bulgaria	19.125	1	
25	Serbia	18.750	1	
26	Scotland	18.625	1	
27	Belarus	18.625	1	
28	Kazakhstan	18.125	1	
29	Norway	17.425	1	
30	Slovenia	14.500	1	
31	Liechtenstein	13.000	0	
32	Slovakia	12.125	1	
33	Moldova	10.000	1	
34	Albania	8.500	1	
35	Iceland	8.250	1	
36	Hungary	8.125	1	
37	North Macedonia	7.500	1	

Rank	Association	Coeff.	Teams	Notes
38	Finland	6.900	1	
39	Republic of Ireland	6.700	1	
40	Bosnia and Herzegovina	6.625	1	
41	Latvia	5.625	1	
42	Estonia	5.500	1	
43	Lithuania	5.375	1	
44	Montenegro	5.000	1	
45	Georgia	5.000	1	
46	Armenia	4.875	1	
47	Malta	4.500	1	
48	Luxembourg	4.375	1	
49	Northern Ireland	4.250	1	
50	Wales	3.875	1	
51	Faroe Islands	3.750	1	
52	Gibraltar	3.000	1	
53	Andorra	1.331	1	
54	San Marino	0.499	1	
55	Kosovo	0.000	1	

=== Distribution ===
The following is the access list for this season.

Access list for 2019–20 UEFA Champions League
		Teams entering in this round	Teams advancing from previous round
Preliminary round (4 teams)		4 champions from associations 52–55	
First qualifying round (32 teams)		31 champions from associations 20–51 (except Liechtenstein)	1 winner from the preliminary round
Second qualifying round	Champions Path (20 teams)	4 champions from associations 16–19	16 winners from the first qualifying round
Second qualifying round	League Path (4 teams)	4 runners-up from associations 12–15	
Third qualifying round	Champions Path (12 teams)	2 champions from associations 14–15	10 winners from the second qualifying round (Champions Path)
Third qualifying round	League Path (8 teams)	5 runners-up from associations 7–11; 1 third-placed team from association 6	2 winners from the second qualifying round (League Path)
Play-off round	Champions Path (8 teams)	2 champions from associations 12–13	6 winners from the third qualifying round (Champions Path)
Play-off round	League Path (4 teams)		4 winners from the third qualifying round (League Path)
Group stage (32 teams)		11 champions from associations 1–11; 6 runners-up from associations 1–6; 5 third-placed teams from associations 1–5; 4 fourth-placed teams from associations 1–4	4 winners from the play-off round (Champions Path); 2 winners from the play-off round (League Path)
Knockout phase (16 teams)			8 group winners from the group stage; 8 group runners-up from the group stage

Changes were made to the default access list, if the Champions League and/or Europa League title holders qualified for the tournament via their domestic leagues. In any case where a spot in the Champions League was vacated, teams of the highest-ranked associations in earlier rounds of the appropriate path were promoted accordingly.

- In the default access list, the Champions League title holders qualified for the group stage. However, since the Champions League title holders (Liverpool) qualified via their domestic league (as second place in the 2018–19 Premier League), the following changes to the access list were made:
  - The champions of association 11 (Austria) entered the group stage instead of the play-off round.
  - The champions of association 13 (Czech Republic) entered the play-off round instead of the third qualifying round.
  - The champions of association 15 (Greece) entered the third qualifying round instead of the second qualifying round.
  - The champions of associations 18 (Israel) and 19 (Cyprus) entered the second qualifying round instead of the first qualifying round.
- In the default access list, the Europa League title holders qualified for the group stage. However, since the Europa League title holders (Chelsea) qualified for the group stage via their domestic league (as third place in the 2018–19 Premier League), the following changes to the access list were made:
  - The third-placed team of association 5 (France) entered the group stage instead of the third qualifying round.
  - The runners-up of associations 10 (Turkey) and 11 (Austria) entered the third qualifying round instead of the second qualifying round.

=== Teams ===
League positions of the previous season shown in parentheses (TH: Champions League title holders; EL: Europa League title holders).

Qualified teams for 2019–20 UEFA Champions League (by entry round) Group stage
(England) Liverpool (2nd)^{TH}	(England) Tottenham Hotspur (4th)	(Germany) RB Leipzig (3rd)	(Portugal) Benfica (1st)
(England) Chelsea (3rd)^{EL}	(Italy) Juventus (1st)	(Germany) Bayer Leverkusen (4th)	(Ukraine) Shakhtar Donetsk (1st)
(Spain) Barcelona (1st)	(Italy) Napoli (2nd)	(France) Paris Saint-Germain (1st)	(Belgium) Genk (1st)
(Spain) Atlético Madrid (2nd)	(Italy) Atalanta (3rd)	(France) Lille (2nd)	(Turkey) Galatasaray (1st)
(Spain) Real Madrid (3rd)	(Italy) Inter Milan (4th)	(France) Lyon (3rd)	(Austria) Red Bull Salzburg (1st)
(Spain) Valencia (4th)	(Germany) Bayern Munich (1st)	(Russia) Zenit Saint Petersburg (1st)	
(England) Manchester City (1st)	(Germany) Borussia Dortmund (2nd)	(Russia) Lokomotiv Moscow (2nd)	

Play-off round
Champions Path		League Path
(Switzerland) Young Boys (1st)	(Czech Republic) Slavia Prague (1st)	

Third qualifying round
Champions Path		League Path	
(Netherlands) Ajax (1st)	(Greece) PAOK (1st)	(Russia) Krasnodar (3rd)	(Belgium) Club Brugge (2nd)
		(Portugal) Porto (2nd)	(Turkey) İstanbul Başakşehir (2nd)
		(Ukraine) Dynamo Kyiv (2nd)	(Austria) LASK (2nd)

Second qualifying round
Champions Path		League Path	
(Croatia) Dinamo Zagreb (1st)	(Israel) Maccabi Tel Aviv (1st)	(Switzerland) Basel (2nd)	(Netherlands) PSV Eindhoven (2nd)
(Denmark) Copenhagen (1st)	(Cyprus) APOEL (1st)	(Czech Republic) Viktoria Plzeň (2nd)	(Greece) Olympiacos (2nd)

First qualifying round
(Romania) CFR Cluj (1st)	(Kazakhstan) Astana (1st)	(North Macedonia) Shkëndija (1st)	(Georgia (country)) Saburtalo Tbilisi (1st)
(Poland) Piast Gliwice (1st)	(Norway) Rosenborg (1st)	(Finland) HJK (1st)	Ararat-Armenia (1st)
(Sweden) AIK (1st)	(Slovenia) Maribor (1st)	(Republic of Ireland) Dundalk (1st)	(Malta) Valletta (1st)
(Azerbaijan) Qarabağ (1st)	(Slovakia) Slovan Bratislava (1st)	(Bosnia and Herzegovina) Sarajevo (1st)	(Luxembourg) F91 Dudelange (1st)
(Bulgaria) Ludogorets Razgrad (1st)	(Moldova) Sheriff Tiraspol (1st)	(Latvia) Riga (1st)	(Northern Ireland) Linfield (1st)
(Serbia) Red Star Belgrade (1st)	(Albania) Partizani (1st)	(Estonia) Nõmme Kalju (1st)	(Wales) The New Saints (1st)
(Scotland) Celtic (1st)	(Iceland) Valur (1st)	(Lithuania) Sūduva (1st)	(Faroe Islands) HB (1st)
(Belarus) BATE Borisov (1st)	(Hungary) Ferencváros (1st)	(Montenegro) Sutjeska (1st)	

Preliminary round
(Gibraltar) Lincoln Red Imps (1st)	(Andorra) FC Santa Coloma (1st)	(San Marino) Tre Penne (1st)	(Kosovo) Feronikeli (1st)

== Round and draw dates ==
The schedule of the competition was as follows (all draws were held at the UEFA headquarters in Nyon, Switzerland, unless stated otherwise).

The competition was suspended on 17 March 2020 due to the COVID-19 pandemic in Europe. A working group was set up by UEFA to decide the calendar of the remainder of the season. On 17 June 2020, UEFA announced the revised schedule for the quarter-finals, semi-finals and final of the competition, to be played in single-leg matches.

Schedule for 2019–20 UEFA Champions League
Phase	Round	Draw date	First leg	Second leg
Qualifying	Preliminary round	11 June 2019	25 June 2019 (semi-final round)	28 June 2019 (final round)
Qualifying	First qualifying round	18 June 2019	9–10 July 2019	16–17 July 2019
Qualifying	Second qualifying round	19 June 2019	23–24 July 2019	30–31 July 2019
Qualifying	Third qualifying round	22 July 2019	6–7 August 2019	13 August 2019
Play-off	Play-off round	5 August 2019	20–21 August 2019	27–28 August 2019
Group stage	Matchday 1	29 August 2019 (Monaco)	17–18 September 2019	
Group stage	Matchday 2	29 August 2019 (Monaco)	1–2 October 2019	
Group stage	Matchday 3	29 August 2019 (Monaco)	22–23 October 2019	
Group stage	Matchday 4	29 August 2019 (Monaco)	5–6 November 2019	
Group stage	Matchday 5	29 August 2019 (Monaco)	26–27 November 2019	
Group stage	Matchday 6	29 August 2019 (Monaco)	10–11 December 2019	
Knockout phase	Round of 16	16 December 2019	18–19 & 25–26 February 2020	10–11 March & 7–8 August 2020
Knockout phase	Quarter-finals	10 July 2020	12–15 August 2020	
Knockout phase	Semi-finals	10 July 2020	18–19 August 2020	
Knockout phase	Final	10 July 2020	23 August 2020 at Estádio da Luz, Lisbon	

The original schedule of the competition, as planned before the pandemic, was as follows.

Original schedule for 2019–20 UEFA Champions League
Phase	Round	Draw date	First leg	Second leg
Qualifying	Preliminary round	11 June 2019	25 June 2019 (semi-final round)	28 June 2019 (final round)
Qualifying	First qualifying round	18 June 2019	9–10 July 2019	16–17 July 2019
Qualifying	Second qualifying round	19 June 2019	23–24 July 2019	30–31 July 2019
Qualifying	Third qualifying round	22 July 2019	6–7 August 2019	13 August 2019
Play-off	Play-off round	5 August 2019	20–21 August 2019	27–28 August 2019
Group stage	Matchday 1	29 August 2019 (Monaco)	17–18 September 2019	
Group stage	Matchday 2	29 August 2019 (Monaco)	1–2 October 2019	
Group stage	Matchday 3	29 August 2019 (Monaco)	22–23 October 2019	
Group stage	Matchday 4	29 August 2019 (Monaco)	5–6 November 2019	
Group stage	Matchday 5	29 August 2019 (Monaco)	26–27 November 2019	
Group stage	Matchday 6	29 August 2019 (Monaco)	10–11 December 2019	
Knockout phase	Round of 16	16 December 2019	18–19 & 25–26 February 2020	10–11 & 17–18 March 2020
Knockout phase	Quarter-finals	20 March 2020	7–8 April 2020	14–15 April 2020
Knockout phase	Semi-finals	20 March 2020	28–29 April 2020	5–6 May 2020
Knockout phase	Final	20 March 2020	30 May 2020 at Atatürk Olympic Stadium, Istanbul	

== Effects of the COVID-19 pandemic ==
The round of 16 ties originally would be played across four weeks, with the first legs being played across two weeks in February and the second legs across two weeks in March. Because of this, the first leg ties were unaffected by the pandemic, but the second leg ties were affected in different ways. All of the four matches in the first week of fixtures went ahead. However, due to the increased severity of the COVID-19 pandemic in Spain and France, Valencia's and PSG's home games were played behind closed doors. On 15 March, UEFA announced a halt to the competition meaning that the remaining second leg games would be postponed indefinitely. A taskforce was convened to reschedule the rest of the season. On 23 March, it was announced that the Atatürk Olympic Stadium in Istanbul, Turkey would no longer host the competition final, originally scheduled for 30 May, but would host the 2021 final instead. This was later postponed further to 2023.

On 17 June, it was announced that the Champions League would return on 7 August and conclude on 23 August, with the rest of the tournament to be held in Portugal, except the four unplayed round of 16 second legs, which would be played at their original venues. The last 8 of the competition would be played as a mini tournament, with the remaining fixtures being played as single-legged ties. All remaining ties of the competition were played behind closed doors due to the ongoing presence of the COVID-19 pandemic in Europe.

=== Final tournament venues ===
Lisbon	Location of venues within Lisbon, Portugal	Lisbon
Estádio da Luz (final venue)	Location of venues within Lisbon, Portugal	Estádio José Alvalade
Capacity: 64,642	Location of venues within Lisbon, Portugal	Capacity: 50,095

== Qualifying rounds ==
In the qualifying rounds and the play-off round, teams were divided into seeded and unseeded teams based on their 2019 UEFA club coefficients, and then drawn into two-legged home-and-away ties.

=== Preliminary round ===
In the preliminary round, teams were divided into seeded and unseeded teams based on their 2019 UEFA club coefficients, and then drawn into one-legged semi-final and final ties. The losers of both semi-final and final rounds entered the 2019–20 UEFA Europa League second qualifying round. The draw for the preliminary round was held on 11 June 2019, 12:00 CEST, to determine the matchups of the semi-finals and the administrative "home" team of each semi-final and final. The semi-final round was played on 25 June, and the final round on 28 June 2019, both at the Fadil Vokrri Stadium in Pristina, Kosovo.

Team 1	Score	Team 2
Semi-final round
Feronikeli (Kosovo)	1–0	(Gibraltar) Lincoln Red Imps
Tre Penne (San Marino)	0–1	(Andorra) FC Santa Coloma
Final round
Feronikeli (Kosovo)	2–1	(Andorra) FC Santa Coloma

=== First qualifying round ===
The losers entered the 2019–20 UEFA Europa League second qualifying round, except one team who was drawn to receive a bye to the 2019–20 UEFA Europa League third qualifying round. The draw for the first qualifying round was held on 18 June 2019, 14:30 CEST. The first legs were played on 9 and 10 July, and the second legs on 16 and 17 July 2019.

Team 1	Agg.	Team 2	1st leg	2nd leg
Nõmme Kalju (Estonia)	2–2 (a)	(North Macedonia) Shkëndija	0–1	2–1
Sūduva (Lithuania)	1–2	(Serbia) Red Star Belgrade	0–0	1–2
Ararat-Armenia	3–4	(Sweden) AIK	2–1	1–3
Astana (Kazakhstan)	2–3	(Romania) CFR Cluj	1–0	1–3
Ferencváros (Hungary)	5–3 (Note: Following a mistake with the original draw not following the correct procedure, UEFA performed a re-draw to establish the home team for each leg in the Ferencváros-Ludogorets Razgrad tie. As a result, the order of legs was reversed. The error did not affect any other tie.)	(Bulgaria) Ludogorets Razgrad	2–1	3–2
Partizani (Albania)	0–2	(Azerbaijan) Qarabağ	0–0	0–2
Slovan Bratislava (Slovakia)	2–2 (2–3 p)	(Montenegro) Sutjeska	1–1	1–1 (a.e.t.)
Sarajevo (Bosnia and Herzegovina)	2–5 (Note: Order of legs reversed after original draw; losers drawn to receive a bye to the Europa League third qualifying round.)	(Scotland) Celtic	1–3	1–2
Sheriff Tiraspol (Moldova)	3–4	(Georgia (country)) Saburtalo Tbilisi	0–3	3–1
F91 Dudelange (Luxembourg)	3–3 (a)	(Malta) Valletta	2–2	1–1
Linfield (Northern Ireland)	0–6	(Norway) Rosenborg	0–2	0–4
Valur (Iceland)	0–5	(Slovenia) Maribor	0–3	0–2
Dundalk (Republic of Ireland)	0–0 (5–4 p)	(Latvia) Riga	0–0	0–0 (a.e.t.)
The New Saints (Wales)	3–2	(Kosovo) Feronikeli	2–2	1–0
HJK (Finland)	5–2	(Faroe Islands) HB	3–0	2–2
BATE Borisov (Belarus)	3–2	(Poland) Piast Gliwice	1–1	2–1

=== Second qualifying round ===
The second qualifying round was split into two separate sections: Champions Path (for league champions) and League Path (for league non-champions). The losers from both Champions Path and League Path entered the 2019–20 UEFA Europa League third qualifying round. The draw for the second qualifying round was held on 19 June 2019, 12:00 CEST. The first legs were played on 23 and 24 July, and the second legs on 30 and 31 July 2019.

Team 1	Agg.	Team 2	1st leg	2nd leg
Champions Path
CFR Cluj (Romania)	3–2	(Israel) Maccabi Tel Aviv	1–0	2–2
BATE Borisov (Belarus)	2–3	(Norway) Rosenborg	2–1	0–2
The New Saints (Wales)	0–3	(Denmark) Copenhagen	0–2	0–1
Ferencváros (Hungary)	4–2	(Malta) Valletta	3–1	1–1
Dundalk (Republic of Ireland)	1–4	(Azerbaijan) Qarabağ	1–1	0–3
Saburtalo Tbilisi (Georgia (country))	0–5	(Croatia) Dinamo Zagreb	0–2	0–3
Celtic (Scotland)	7–0	(Estonia) Nõmme Kalju	5–0	2–0
Red Star Belgrade (Serbia)	3–2	(Finland) HJK	2–0	1–2
Sutjeska (Montenegro)	0–4	(Cyprus) APOEL	0–1	0–3
Maribor (Slovenia)	4–4 (a)	(Sweden) AIK	2–1	2–3 (a.e.t.)
League Path
Viktoria Plzeň (Czech Republic)	0–4	(Greece) Olympiacos	0–0	0–4
PSV Eindhoven (Netherlands)	4–4 (a)	(Switzerland) Basel	3–2	1–2

=== Third qualifying round ===
The third qualifying round was split into two separate sections: Champions Path (for league champions) and League Path (for league non-champions). The losers from the Champions Path entered the 2019–20 UEFA Europa League play-off round, while the losers from the League Path entered the 2019–20 UEFA Europa League group stage. The draw for the third qualifying round was held on 22 July 2019, 12:00 CEST. The first legs were played on 6 and 7 August, and the second legs on 13 August 2019.

Team 1	Agg.	Team 2	1st leg	2nd leg
Champions Path
CFR Cluj (Romania)	5–4	(Scotland) Celtic	1–1	4–3
APOEL (Cyprus)	3–2	(Azerbaijan) Qarabağ	1–2	2–0
PAOK (Greece)	4–5	(Netherlands) Ajax	2–2	2–3
Dinamo Zagreb (Croatia)	5–1	(Hungary) Ferencváros	1–1	4–0
Red Star Belgrade (Serbia)	2–2 (7–6 p)	(Denmark) Copenhagen	1–1	1–1 (a.e.t.)
Maribor (Slovenia)	2–6	(Norway) Rosenborg	1–3	1–3
League Path
İstanbul Başakşehir (Turkey)	0–3	(Greece) Olympiacos	0–1	0–2
Krasnodar (Russia)	3–3 (a)	(Portugal) Porto	0–1	3–2
Club Brugge (Belgium)	4–3	(Ukraine) Dynamo Kyiv	1–0	3–3
Basel (Switzerland)	2–5	(Austria) LASK	1–2	1–3

== Play-off round ==
The play-off round was split into two separate sections: Champions Path (for league champions) and League Path (for league non-champions). The losers from both Champions Path and League Path entered the 2019–20 UEFA Europa League group stage. From this stage, the video assistant referee was used. The draw for the play-off round was held on 5 August 2019, 12:00 CEST. The first legs were played on 20 and 21 August, and the second legs on 27 and 28 August 2019.

Team 1	Agg.	Team 2	1st leg	2nd leg
Champions Path
Dinamo Zagreb (Croatia)	3–1	(Norway) Rosenborg	2–0	1–1
CFR Cluj (Romania)	0–2	(Czech Republic) Slavia Prague	0–1	0–1
Young Boys (Switzerland)	3–3 (a)	(Serbia) Red Star Belgrade	2–2	1–1
APOEL (Cyprus)	0–2	(Netherlands) Ajax	0–0	0–2
League Path
LASK (Austria)	1–3	(Belgium) Club Brugge	0–1	1–2
Olympiacos (Greece)	6–1	(Russia) Krasnodar	4–0	2–1

== Group stage ==
Location of teams of the 2019–20 UEFA Champions League group stage.
Brown: Group A; Red: Group B; Orange: Group C; Yellow: Group D;
Green: Group E; Blue: Group F; Purple: Group G; Pink: Group H.

The draw for the group stage was held on 29 August 2019, 18:00 CEST, at the Grimaldi Forum in Monaco. The 32 teams were drawn into eight groups of four, with the restriction that teams from the same association could not be drawn against each other. For the draw, the teams were seeded into four pots based on the following principles:

- Pot 1 contained the Champions League and Europa League title holders, and the champions of the top six associations based on their 2018 UEFA country coefficients. If one or both title holders were one of the champions of the top six associations, the champions of the next highest ranked association(s) were also seeded into Pot 1.
- Pot 2, 3 and 4 contained the remaining teams, seeded based on their 2019 UEFA club coefficients.

In each group, teams played against each other home-and-away in a round-robin format. The group winners and runners-up advanced to the round of 16, while the third-placed teams entered the 2019–20 UEFA Europa League round of 32. The matchdays were 17–18 September, 1–2 October, 22–23 October, 5–6 November, 26–27 November, and 10–11 December 2019.

The youth teams of the clubs that qualified for the group stage also participated in the 2019–20 UEFA Youth League on the same matchdays, where they competed in the UEFA Champions League Path (the youth domestic champions of the top 32 associations competed in a separate Domestic Champions Path until the play-offs).

A total of sixteen national associations were represented in the group stage. Atalanta made their debut appearance in the group stage.

Tiebreakers
Teams were ranked according to points (3 points for a win, 1 point for a draw, 0 points for a loss), and if tied on points, the following tiebreaking criteria were applied, in the order given, to determine the rankings (Regulations Articles 17.01):
1. Points in head-to-head matches among tied teams;
2. Goal difference in head-to-head matches among tied teams;
3. Goals scored in head-to-head matches among tied teams;
4. Away goals scored in head-to-head matches among tied teams;
5. If more than two teams were tied, and after applying all head-to-head criteria above, a subset of teams were still tied, all head-to-head criteria above were reapplied exclusively to this subset of teams;
6. Goal difference in all group matches;
7. Goals scored in all group matches;
8. Away goals scored in all group matches;
9. Wins in all group matches;
10. Away wins in all group matches;
11. Disciplinary points (red card = 3 points, yellow card = 1 point, expulsion for two yellow cards in one match = 3 points);
12. UEFA club coefficient.

=== Group A ===
Pos	Team	Pld	W	D	L	GF	GA	GD	Pts	Qualification	PAR	RMA	BRU	GAL
1	(France) Paris Saint-Germain	6	5	1	0	17	2	+15	16	Advance to knockout phase	—	3–0	1–0	5–0
2	(Spain) Real Madrid	6	3	2	1	14	8	+6	11	Advance to knockout phase	2–2	—	2–2	6–0
3	(Belgium) Club Brugge	6	0	3	3	4	12	−8	3	Transfer to Europa League	0–5	1–3	—	0–0
4	(Turkey) Galatasaray	6	0	2	4	1	14	−13	2		0–1	0–1	1–1	—

Source: UEFA

=== Group B ===
Pos	Team	Pld	W	D	L	GF	GA	GD	Pts	Qualification	BAY	TOT	OLY	RSB
1	(Germany) Bayern Munich	6	6	0	0	24	5	+19	18	Advance to knockout phase	—	3–1	2–0	3–0
2	(England) Tottenham Hotspur	6	3	1	2	18	14	+4	10	Advance to knockout phase	2–7	—	4–2	5–0
3	(Greece) Olympiacos	6	1	1	4	8	14	−6	4	Transfer to Europa League	2–3	2–2	—	1–0
4	(Serbia) Red Star Belgrade	6	1	0	5	3	20	−17	3		0–6	0–4	3–1	—

Source: UEFA

=== Group C ===
Pos	Team	Pld	W	D	L	GF	GA	GD	Pts	Qualification	MCI	ATA	SHK	DZG
1	(England) Manchester City	6	4	2	0	16	4	+12	14	Advance to knockout phase	—	5–1	1–1	2–0
2	(Italy) Atalanta	6	2	1	3	8	12	−4	7	Advance to knockout phase	1–1	—	1–2	2–0
3	(Ukraine) Shakhtar Donetsk	6	1	3	2	8	13	−5	6	Transfer to Europa League	0–3	0–3	—	2–2
4	(Croatia) Dinamo Zagreb	6	1	2	3	10	13	−3	5		1–4	4–0	3–3	—

Source: UEFA

=== Group D ===
Pos	Team	Pld	W	D	L	GF	GA	GD	Pts	Qualification	JUV	ATM	LEV	LMO
1	(Italy) Juventus	6	5	1	0	12	4	+8	16	Advance to knockout phase	—	1–0	3–0	2–1
2	(Spain) Atlético Madrid	6	3	1	2	8	5	+3	10	Advance to knockout phase	2–2	—	1–0	2–0
3	(Germany) Bayer Leverkusen	6	2	0	4	5	9	−4	6	Transfer to Europa League	0–2	2–1	—	1–2
4	(Russia) Lokomotiv Moscow	6	1	0	5	4	11	−7	3		1–2	0–2	0–2	—

Source: UEFA

=== Group E ===
Pos	Team	Pld	W	D	L	GF	GA	GD	Pts	Qualification	LIV	NAP	SAL	GNK
1	(England) Liverpool	6	4	1	1	13	8	+5	13	Advance to knockout phase	—	1–1	4–3	2–1
2	(Italy) Napoli	6	3	3	0	11	4	+7	12	Advance to knockout phase	2–0	—	1–1	4–0
3	(Austria) Red Bull Salzburg	6	2	1	3	16	13	+3	7	Transfer to Europa League	0–2	2–3	—	6–2
4	(Belgium) Genk	6	0	1	5	5	20	−15	1		1–4	0–0	1–4	—

Source: UEFA

=== Group F ===
Pos	Team	Pld	W	D	L	GF	GA	GD	Pts	Qualification	BAR	DOR	INT	SLP
1	(Spain) Barcelona	6	4	2	0	9	4	+5	14	Advance to knockout phase	—	3–1	2–1	0–0
2	(Germany) Borussia Dortmund	6	3	1	2	8	8	0	10	Advance to knockout phase	0–0	—	3–2	2–1
3	(Italy) Inter Milan	6	2	1	3	10	9	+1	7	Transfer to Europa League	1–2	2–0	—	1–1
4	(Czech Republic) Slavia Prague	6	0	2	4	4	10	−6	2		1–2	0–2	1–3	—

Source: UEFA

=== Group G ===
Pos	Team	Pld	W	D	L	GF	GA	GD	Pts	Qualification	RBL	LYO	BEN	ZEN
1	(Germany) RB Leipzig	6	3	2	1	10	8	+2	11	Advance to knockout phase	—	0–2	2–2	2–1
2	(France) Lyon	6	2	2	2	9	8	+1	8	Advance to knockout phase	2–2	—	3–1	1–1
3	(Portugal) Benfica	6	2	1	3	10	11	−1	7 (Note: Tied on head-to-head points (3). Head-to-head goal difference: Benfica +1, Zenit Saint Petersburg −1.)	Transfer to Europa League	1–2	2–1	—	3–0
4	(Russia) Zenit Saint Petersburg	6	2	1	3	7	9	−2	7		0–2	2–0	3–1	—

Source: UEFA

=== Group H ===
Pos	Team	Pld	W	D	L	GF	GA	GD	Pts	Qualification	VAL	CHE	AJX	LIL
1	(Spain) Valencia	6	3	2	1	9	7	+2	11 (Note: Head-to-head points: Valencia 4, Chelsea 1.)	Advance to knockout phase	—	2–2	0–3	4–1
2	(England) Chelsea	6	3	2	1	11	9	+2	11	Advance to knockout phase	0–1	—	4–4	2–1
3	(Netherlands) Ajax	6	3	1	2	12	6	+6	10	Transfer to Europa League	0–1	0–1	—	3–0
4	(France) Lille	6	0	1	5	4	14	−10	1		1–1	1–2	0–2	—

Source: UEFA

== Knockout phase ==
In the knockout phase, teams played against each other over two legs on a home-and-away basis, except for the one-match final. The mechanism of the draws for each round was as follows:

- In the draw for the round of 16, the eight group winners were seeded, and the eight group runners-up were unseeded. The seeded teams were drawn against the unseeded teams, with the seeded teams hosting the second leg. Teams from the same group or the same association could not be drawn against each other.
- In the draws for the quarter-finals onwards, there were no seedings, and teams from the same group or the same association could be drawn against each other. As the draws for the quarter-finals and semi-finals were held together before the quarter-finals were played, the identity of the quarter-final winners was not known at the time of the semi-final draw. A draw was also held to determine which semi-final winner was designated as the "home" team for the final (for administrative purposes as it was played at a neutral venue).

For the quarter-finals and semi-finals, teams from the same city were not to be scheduled to play at home on the same day or on consecutive days, due to logistics and crowd control. To avoid such scheduling conflict, if the two teams were drawn to play at home for the same leg, the order of legs of the tie involving the team which were not titleholders of Champions League or Europa League, or the team with the lower domestic ranking in the qualifying season (if neither team were continental title holder) was to be reversed from the original draw.

On 17 June 2020, UEFA announced that due to the COVID-19 pandemic in Europe, the final stages of the competition would feature a format change: the quarter-finals, semi-finals and final would be played in a single-leg format from 12 to 23 August 2020 at the Estádio da Luz and Estádio José Alvalade in Lisbon, Portugal. The matches were played behind closed doors, through the decisions of the national and local government.

Following the competition restart in August 2020, a maximum of five substitutions were allowed, with a sixth allowed in extra time. However, each team was only given three opportunities to make substitutions, with a fourth opportunity in extra time, excluding substitutions made at half-time, before the start of extra time and at half-time in extra time. This followed a proposal from FIFA and approval by IFAB to lessen the impact of fixture congestion.

=== Bracket ===
Round of 16
(England) Tottenham Hotspur	0	0	0
(Germany) RB Leipzig	1	3	4
(Spain) Atlético Madrid (a.e.t.)	1	3	4
(England) Liverpool	0	2	2
(Italy) Atalanta	4	4	8
(Spain) Valencia	1	3	4
(Germany) Borussia Dortmund	2	0	2
(France) Paris Saint-Germain	1	2	3
(Spain) Real Madrid	1	1	2
(England) Manchester City	2	2	4
(France) Lyon (a)	1	1	2
(Italy) Juventus	0	2	2
(Italy) Napoli	1	1	2
(Spain) Barcelona	1	3	4
(England) Chelsea	0	1	1
(Germany) Bayern Munich	3	4	7

Quarter-finals
13 August – Lisbon (Alvalade)
(Germany) RB Leipzig	2
(Spain) Atlético Madrid	1
12 August – Lisbon (Luz)
(Italy) Atalanta	1
(France) Paris Saint-Germain	2
15 August – Lisbon (Alvalade)
(England) Manchester City	1
(France) Lyon	3
14 August – Lisbon (Luz)
(Spain) Barcelona	2
(Germany) Bayern Munich	8

Semi-finals
18 August – Lisbon (Luz)
(Germany) RB Leipzig	0
(France) Paris Saint-Germain	3
19 August – Lisbon (Alvalade)
(France) Lyon	0
(Germany) Bayern Munich	3

Final
23 August – Lisbon (Luz)
(France) Paris Saint-Germain	0
(Germany) Bayern Munich	1

=== Round of 16 ===
The draw for the round of 16 was held on 16 December 2019, 12:00 CET. The first legs were played as scheduled on 18, 19, 25 and 26 February, as were the first set of second legs on 10 and 11 March 2020. Due to concerns over the COVID-19 pandemic in Europe, the second set of second leg matches were postponed by UEFA on 13 March 2020. On 17 June 2020, UEFA announced that the second legs would be played on 7–8 August 2020, with the venue to be decided between the home team's stadium and a neutral stadium in Portugal (at the Estádio do Dragão in Porto and the Estádio D. Afonso Henriques in Guimarães). On 9 July 2020, UEFA announced that the remaining second legs would be held at the venues originally proposed.

The first leg of the Atalanta v Valencia tie was retrospectively blamed by local civic and medical authorities for contributing to the extremely high concentration of coronavirus cases in Atalanta's home city of Bergamo. Several fans and players of Valencia also had positive diagnoses after returning from the game. The second leg of the Atlético Madrid v Liverpool tie was similarly blamed for the sharp increase in coronavirus-related deaths in North West England.

Team 1	Agg.	Team 2	1st leg	2nd leg
Borussia Dortmund (Germany)	2–3	(France) Paris Saint-Germain	2–1	0–2
Real Madrid (Spain)	2–4	(England) Manchester City	1–2	1–2
Atalanta (Italy)	8–4	(Spain) Valencia	4–1	4–3
Atlético Madrid (Spain)	4–2	(England) Liverpool	1–0	3–2 (a.e.t.)
Chelsea (England)	1–7	(Germany) Bayern Munich	0–3	1–4
Lyon (France)	2–2 (a)	(Italy) Juventus	1–0	1–2
Tottenham Hotspur (England)	0–4	(Germany) RB Leipzig	0–1	0–3
Napoli (Italy)	2–4	(Spain) Barcelona	1–1	1–3

=== Quarter-finals ===
The draw for the quarter-finals took place on 10 July 2020. The matches were played from 12 to 15 August 2020.

Team 1	Score	Team 2
Manchester City (England)	1–3	(France) Lyon
RB Leipzig (Germany)	2–1	(Spain) Atlético Madrid
Barcelona (Spain)	2–8	(Germany) Bayern Munich
Atalanta (Italy)	1–2	(France) Paris Saint-Germain

=== Semi-finals ===
The draw for the semi-finals took place on 10 July 2020 (after the quarter-final draw). The matches were played on 18 and 19 August 2020.

Team 1	Score	Team 2
Lyon (France)	0–3	(Germany) Bayern Munich
RB Leipzig (Germany)	0–3	(France) Paris Saint-Germain

=== Final ===
The final was played at the Estádio da Luz in Lisbon. The "home" team (for administrative purposes) was determined by an additional draw held after the quarter-final and semi-final draws.

23 August 2020
20:00 UTC+1

Paris Saint-Germain (France)	0–1	(Germany) Bayern Munich
	Report	Coman 59'

Estádio da Luz, Lisbon
Attendance: 0 (Note: The remainder of the competition, held in August 2020, was played behind closed doors due to the COVID-19 pandemic in Europe.)
Referee: Daniele Orsato (Italy)

== Statistics ==
Statistics exclude qualifying rounds and play-off round.

=== Top goalscorers ===
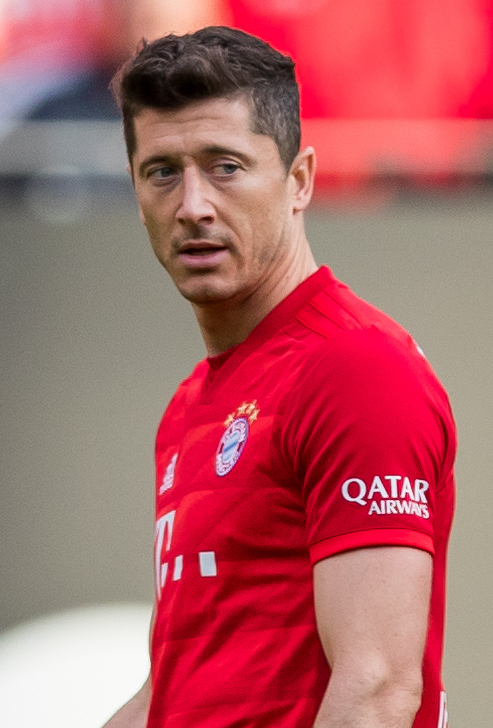
Bayern Munich's Robert Lewandowski finished the tournament as the top goalscorer and joint top assist provider, having scored 15 goals and assisting 6.

Rank	Player	Team(s)	Goals	Minutes played
1	(Poland) Robert Lewandowski	(Germany) Bayern Munich	15	887
2	(Norway) Erling Haaland (Note: Erling Haaland played for Red Bull Salzburg in the group stage and for Borussia Dortmund in the knockout stage, after his transfer during the January transfer window.)	(Austria) Red Bull Salzburg (Germany) Borussia Dortmund	10	554
3	(Germany) Serge Gnabry	(Germany) Bayern Munich	9	767
4	(England) Harry Kane	(England) Tottenham Hotspur	6	450
4	(Belgium) Dries Mertens	(Italy) Napoli	6	586
4	(Brazil) Gabriel Jesus	(England) Manchester City	6	590
4	(Netherlands) Memphis Depay	(France) Lyon	6	594
4	(England) Raheem Sterling	(England) Manchester City	6	599
9	(South Korea) Son Heung-min	(England) Tottenham Hotspur	5	365
9	(Argentina) Mauro Icardi	(France) Paris Saint-Germain	5	480
9	(Slovenia) Josip Iličić	(Italy) Atalanta	5	516
9	(Argentina) Lautaro Martínez	(Italy) Inter Milan	5	521
9	(Uruguay) Luis Suárez	(Spain) Barcelona	5	567
9	(France) Karim Benzema	(Spain) Real Madrid	5	643
9	(France) Kylian Mbappé	(France) Paris Saint-Germain	5	652

=== Top assists ===
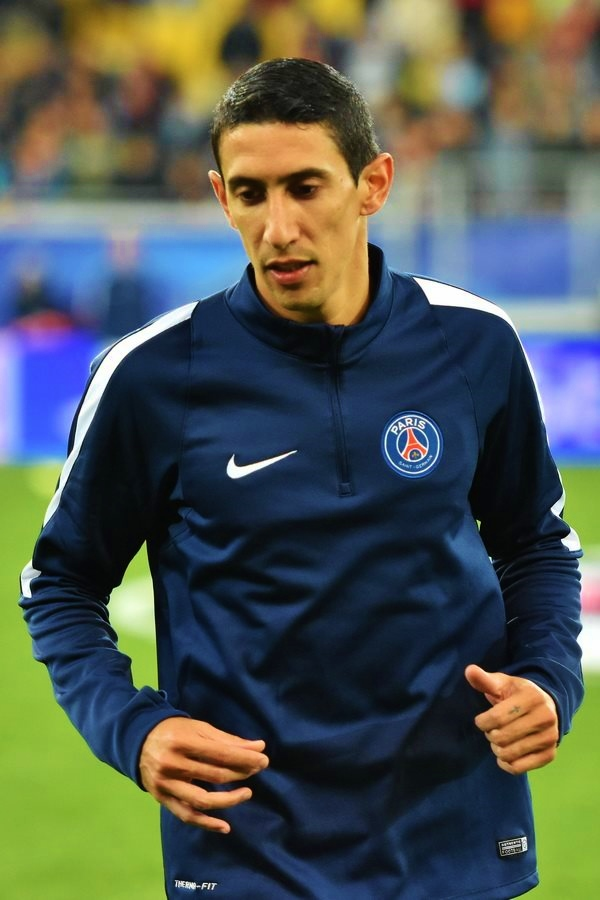
Paris Saint-Germain's Ángel Di María finished the tournament as the joint top assist provider, having assisted 6 goals.

Rank	Player	Team(s)	Assists	Minutes played
1	(Argentina) Ángel Di María	(France) Paris Saint-Germain	6	750
1	(Poland) Robert Lewandowski	(Germany) Bayern Munich	6	887
3	(Morocco) Hakim Ziyech	(Netherlands) Ajax	5	499
3	(France) Kylian Mbappé	(France) Paris Saint-Germain	5	652
3	(France) Houssem Aouar	(France) Lyon	5	715
6	(France) Corentin Tolisso	(Germany) Bayern Munich	4	341
6	(Algeria) Riyad Mahrez	(England) Manchester City	4	572
6	(Brazil) Neymar	(France) Paris Saint-Germain	4	585
6	(Brazil) Roberto Firmino	(England) Liverpool	4	629
6	(Canada) Alphonso Davies	(Germany) Bayern Munich	4	713

=== Squad of the season ===
The UEFA technical study group selected the following 23 players as the squad of the tournament.

Pos.	Player	Team(s)
GK	(Germany) Manuel Neuer	(Germany) Bayern Munich
GK	(Slovenia) Jan Oblak	(Spain) Atlético Madrid
GK	(Portugal) Anthony Lopes	(France) Lyon
DF	(Canada) Alphonso Davies	(Germany) Bayern Munich
DF	(Germany) Joshua Kimmich	(Germany) Bayern Munich
DF	(Netherlands) Virgil van Dijk	(England) Liverpool
DF	(France) Dayot Upamecano	(Germany) RB Leipzig
DF	(Spain) Angeliño (Note: Angeliño played for Manchester City in the group stage and for RB Leipzig in the knockout stage, after his transfer during the January transfer window.)	(England) Manchester City (Germany) RB Leipzig
DF	(Austria) David Alaba	(Germany) Bayern Munich
MF	(Spain) Thiago	(Germany) Bayern Munich
MF	(Belgium) Kevin De Bruyne	(England) Manchester City
MF	(Algeria) Houssem Aouar	(France) Lyon
MF	(Germany) Leon Goretzka	(Germany) Bayern Munich
MF	(Austria) Marcel Sabitzer	(Germany) RB Leipzig
MF	(Brazil) Marquinhos	(France) Paris Saint-Germain
MF	(Argentina) Alejandro Gómez	(Italy) Atalanta
MF	(Germany) Thomas Müller	(Germany) Bayern Munich
FW	(Germany) Serge Gnabry	(Germany) Bayern Munich
FW	(Poland) Robert Lewandowski	(Germany) Bayern Munich
FW	(France) Kylian Mbappé	(France) Paris Saint-Germain
FW	(Brazil) Neymar	(France) Paris Saint-Germain
FW	(Argentina) Lionel Messi	(Spain) Barcelona
FW	(England) Raheem Sterling	(England) Manchester City

=== Players of the season ===
Votes were cast for players of the season by coaches of the 32 teams in the group stage, together with 55 journalists selected by the European Sports Media (ESM) group, representing each of UEFA's member associations. The coaches were not allowed to vote for players from their own teams. Jury members selected their top three players, with the first receiving five points, the second three and the third one. The shortlist of the top three players was announced on 16 September 2020. The award winners were announced and presented during the 2020–21 UEFA Champions League group stage draw in Switzerland on 1 October 2020.

==== Goalkeeper of the season ====
Rank	Player	Team(s)	Points
Shortlist of top three
1	(Germany) Manuel Neuer	(Germany) Bayern Munich	376
2	(Slovenia) Jan Oblak	(Spain) Atlético Madrid	92
3	(Costa Rica) Keylor Navas	(France) Paris Saint-Germain	89
Players ranked 4–10
4	(Portugal) Anthony Lopes	(France) Lyon	46
5	(Brazil) Alisson	(England) Liverpool	28
6	(Belgium) Thibaut Courtois	(Spain) Real Madrid	18
6	(Germany) Marc-André ter Stegen	(Spain) Barcelona	18
8	(Hungary) Péter Gulácsi	(Germany) RB Leipzig	15
9	(Poland) Wojciech Szczęsny	(Italy) Juventus	10
10	(Brazil) Ederson	(England) Manchester City	8

==== Defender of the season ====
Rank	Player	Team(s)	Points
Shortlist of top three
1	(Germany) Joshua Kimmich	(Germany) Bayern Munich	161
2	(Canada) Alphonso Davies	(Germany) Bayern Munich	138
3	(Austria) David Alaba	(Germany) Bayern Munich	119
Players ranked 4–10
4	(Netherlands) Virgil van Dijk	(England) Liverpool	79
5	(Brazil) Thiago Silva	(France) Paris Saint-Germain	54
6	(France) Dayot Upamecano	(Germany) RB Leipzig	46
7	(Spain) Sergio Ramos	(Spain) Real Madrid	35
8	(Brazil) Marquinhos	(France) Paris Saint-Germain	21
9	(England) Trent Alexander-Arnold	(England) Liverpool	10
10	(Netherlands) Matthijs de Ligt	(Italy) Juventus	8

==== Midfielder of the season ====
Rank	Player	Team(s)	Points
Shortlist of top three
1	(Belgium) Kevin De Bruyne	(England) Manchester City	171
2	(Spain) Thiago	(Germany) Bayern Munich	169
3	(Germany) Thomas Müller	(Germany) Bayern Munich	78
Players ranked 4–10
4	(Germany) Serge Gnabry	(Germany) Bayern Munich	46
5	(Brazil) Marquinhos	(France) Paris Saint-Germain	44
6	(Germany) Joshua Kimmich	(Germany) Bayern Munich	40
7	(Germany) Leon Goretzka	(Germany) Bayern Munich	39
8	(France) Houssem Aouar	(France) Lyon	22
9	(Argentina) Ángel Di María	(France) Paris Saint-Germain	20
10	(Austria) Marcel Sabitzer	(Germany) RB Leipzig	18

==== Forward of the season ====
Rank	Player	Team(s)	Points
Shortlist of top three
1	(Poland) Robert Lewandowski	(Germany) Bayern Munich	361
2	(France) Kylian Mbappé	(France) Paris Saint-Germain	72
3	(Brazil) Neymar	(France) Paris Saint-Germain	62
Players ranked 4–10
4	(Germany) Serge Gnabry	(Germany) Bayern Munich	46
5	(Norway) Erling Haaland	(Austria) Red Bull Salzburg (Germany) Borussia Dortmund	33
5	(Argentina) Lionel Messi	(Spain) Barcelona	33
7	(Germany) Thomas Müller	(Germany) Bayern Munich	29
8	(Portugal) Cristiano Ronaldo	(Italy) Juventus	18
9	(Argentina) Ángel Di María	(France) Paris Saint-Germain	9
10	(Senegal) Sadio Mané	(England) Liverpool	8

== See also ==
- 2019–20 UEFA Europa League
- 2020 UEFA Super Cup
- 2019–20 UEFA Women's Champions League
- 2019–20 UEFA Futsal Champions League
- 2019–20 UEFA Youth League
