= 2019–20 UEFA Youth League =

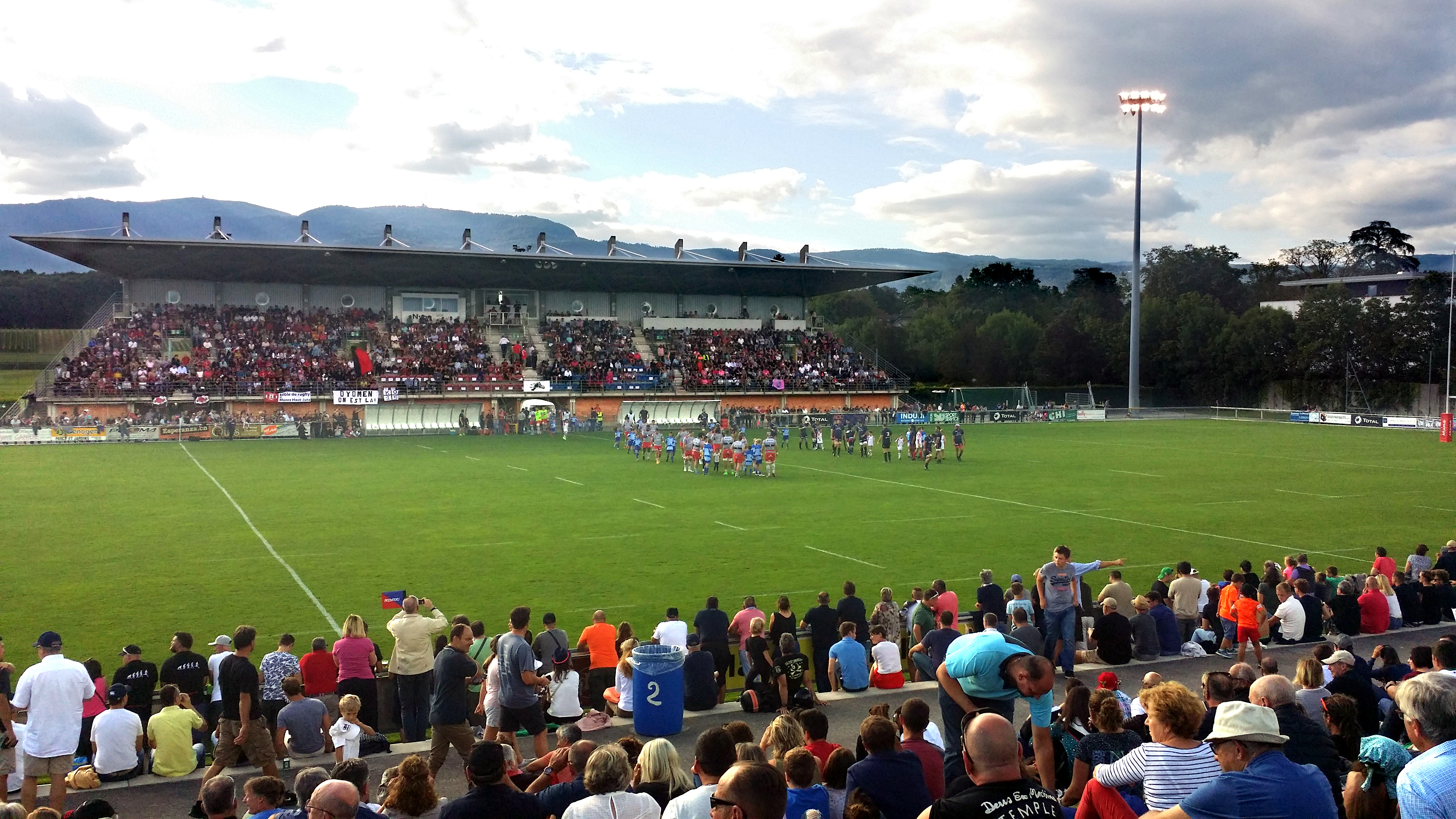
- The Colovray Stadium in Nyon hosted the final.

Tournament details
- Dates: 17 September 2019 – 25 August 2020
- Teams: 64 (from 41 associations)

Final positions
- Champions: (Spain) Real Madrid (1st title)
- Runners-up: (Portugal) Benfica

Tournament statistics
- Matches played: 167
- Goals scored: 554 (3.32 per match)
- Top scorer(s): (Italy) Roberto Piccoli (Atalanta) (Portugal) Gonçalo Ramos (Benfica); 8 goals each

The 2019–20 UEFA Youth League was the seventh season of the UEFA Youth League, a European youth club football competition organised by UEFA.

Following the round of 16, the competition was postponed indefinitely due to the COVID-19 pandemic in Europe. The final tournament consisting of the semi-finals and final, originally scheduled to be played on 17 and 20 April 2020 at the Colovray Stadium in Nyon, Switzerland, were officially postponed on 18 March 2020. On 17 June 2020, UEFA announced that the remaining matches, including two round of 16 matches, quarter-finals, semi-finals and final, would be played between 16 and 25 August at the Colovray Stadium in Nyon, Switzerland behind closed doors.

Real Madrid defeated Benfica in the final 3–2 to win their first title. Porto were the defending champions, but were eliminated by Red Bull Salzburg in the play-offs.

== Teams ==
A total of 64 teams from at least 32 of the 55 UEFA member associations could enter the tournament. They were split into two sections, each with 32 teams:

- UEFA Champions League Path: The youth teams of the 32 clubs which qualified for the 2019–20 UEFA Champions League group stage entered the UEFA Champions League Path. If there was a vacancy (youth teams not entering), it was filled by a team defined by UEFA.
- Domestic Champions Path: The youth domestic champions of the top 32 associations according to their 2018 UEFA country coefficients entered the Domestic Champions Path. If there was a vacancy (associations with no youth domestic competition, as well as youth domestic champions already included in the UEFA Champions League path), it was first filled by the title holders should they have not yet qualified, and then by the youth domestic champions of the next association in the UEFA ranking.

For this season, 41 associations were represented, with Estonia being represented for the first time.

Qualified teams for 2019–20 UEFA Youth League
Rank	Association	Teams	
Rank	Association	UEFA Champions League Path	Domestic Champions Path
1	Spain	Barcelona; Atlético Madrid; Real Madrid; Valencia	Zaragoza (2018–19 División de Honor Juvenil U-19)
2	England	Manchester City; Liverpool; Chelsea; Tottenham Hotspur	Derby County (2018–19 U18 Premier League)
3	Italy	Juventus; Napoli; Atalanta (2018–19 Campionato Primavera 1); Inter Milan	
4	Germany	Bayern Munich; Borussia Dortmund (2018–19 U19 Bundesliga); RB Leipzig; Bayer Leverkusen	
5	France	Paris Saint-Germain; Lille; Lyon	Rennes (2018–19 Championnat National U19)
6	Russia	Zenit Saint Petersburg; Lokomotiv Moscow (2018 U17 RFS Cup)	
7	Portugal	Benfica	Porto (2018–19 Campeonato Nacional Juniores S19)
8	Ukraine	Shakhtar Donetsk	Dynamo Kyiv (2018–19 Ukrainian U19 League)
9	Belgium	Genk (2018–19 Belgian U18 League); Club Brugge	
10	Turkey	Galatasaray (2019 U19 Süper Kupa)	
11	Austria	Red Bull Salzburg (2018–19 Jugendliga U18)	
12	Switzerland		Young Boys (2018–19 Swiss U18 League)
13	Czech Republic	Slavia Prague (2018–19 Czech U19 League)	
14	Netherlands	Ajax (2018–19 Eredivisie U19)	
15	Greece	Olympiacos	PAOK (2018–19 Superleague K19)
16	Croatia	Dinamo Zagreb (2018–19 1. HNL Juniori U19)	
17	Denmark		Midtjylland (2018–19 U19 Ligaen)
18	Israel		Maccabi Petah Tikva (2018–19 Israeli Noar Premier League)
19	Cyprus		APOEL (2018–19 Cypriot U19 League)
20	Romania		Viitorul Constanța (2018–19 Liga Elitelor U19)
21	Poland		Korona Kielce (2018–19 Polish U18 Central Junior League)
22	Sweden		IF Elfsborg (2018 Swedish U17 League)
23	Azerbaijan		Gabala (2018–19 Azerbaijani U19 League)
24	Bulgaria		Ludogorets Razgrad (2018–19 U18 BFU Cup)
25	Serbia	Red Star Belgrade	Brodarac (2018–19 Serbian U19 League)
26	Scotland		Rangers (2018–19 Scottish U18 League)
27	Belarus		Minsk (2018–19 Belarusian U18 League)
28	Kazakhstan		Astana (2018 Kazakhstani U17 League)
29	Norway		Sogndal (2018 Norwegian U19 Cup)
30	Slovenia		Domžale (2018–19 Slovenian U19 League)
32	Slovakia		Slovan Bratislava (2018–19 Slovak U19 League)
33	Moldova		Sheriff Tiraspol (2018–19 Divizia Națională U19)
34	Albania		Shkëndija Tiranë (2018–19 Albanian U19 League)
35	Iceland		ÍA (2018 Icelandic U19 League)
36	Hungary		MTK Budapest (2018–19 Hungarian U19 League)
37	North Macedonia		Shkëndija (2018–19 Macedonian U19 League)
38	Finland		Honka (2018 U17 B-Junior League)
39	Republic of Ireland		Bohemians (2018 League of Ireland U19 Division)
40	Bosnia and Herzegovina		Zrinjski Mostar (2018–19 Bosnia and Herzegovina U19 Junior League)
41	Latvia		Liepāja (2018 Latvian U18 League)
42	Estonia		FCI Levadia (2018 Estonian U19 League)

Notes

1. ^{TH} Title holders.
2. ^{YC} Teams playing in the UEFA Champions League Path which were also youth domestic champions.
3. ^{PO} Teams playing in the UEFA Champions League Path after their senior team qualified for the Champions League group stage via play-offs.
4. ^{V-LIE} Team playing in the Domestic Champions Path through the vacancy of Liechtenstein (no youth domestic competition).
5. ^{V-YC} Teams playing in the Domestic Champions Path through the vacancies of teams which qualified for the Champions League group stage automatically.
6. ^{V-PO} Teams playing in the Domestic Champions Path through the vacancy of teams which qualified for the Champions League group stage via play-offs.
7. Belarus (BLR): The Belarusian youth domestic champions RGUOR did not meet the entry criteria, so the berth was given to the runners-up Minsk.

Associations without any participating teams (no teams qualified for UEFA Champions League group stage, and either with no youth domestic competition or not ranked high enough for a vacancy)

Rank	Association
31	Liechtenstein
43	Lithuania
44	Montenegro
45	Georgia
46	Armenia

Rank	Association
47	Malta
48	Luxembourg
49	Northern Ireland
50	Wales
51	Faroe Islands

Rank	Association
52	Gibraltar
53	Andorra
54	San Marino
55	Kosovo

== Squads ==
Teams could name a squad of no more than forty players. A maximum of five players could be born between 1 January 2000 and 31 December 2000, with no more than three of these players in a matchday squad, while the remainder had to be born on or after 1 January 2001.

== Round and draw dates ==
The schedule of the competition was as follows (all draws were held at the UEFA headquarters in Nyon, Switzerland, unless stated otherwise).

- For the UEFA Champions League Path group stage, in principle the teams played their matches on Tuesdays and Wednesdays of the matchdays as scheduled for UEFA Champions League, and on the same day as the corresponding senior teams; however, matches could also be played on other dates, including Mondays and Thursdays.
- For the Domestic Champions Path first and second rounds, in principle matches were played on Wednesdays (first round on matchdays 2 and 3, second round on matchdays 4 and 5, as scheduled for UEFA Champions League); however, matches could also be played on other dates, including Mondays, Tuesdays and Thursdays.
- For the play-offs, round of 16 and quarter-finals, in principle matches were played on Tuesdays and Wednesdays of the matchdays as scheduled; however, matches could also be played on other dates, provided they were completed before the following dates:
  - Play-offs: 13 February 2020
  - Round of 16: 6 March 2020
  - Quarter-finals: 20 March 2020

The competition was suspended on 17 March 2020 due to the COVID-19 pandemic in Europe. The final tournament consisting of the semi-finals and final, originally scheduled to be played on 17 and 20 April 2020 at the Colovray Stadium in Nyon, Switzerland, wad officially postponed on 18 March 2020. A working group was set up by UEFA to decide the calendar of the remainder of the season, with the final decision made at the UEFA Executive Committee meeting on 17 June 2020.

Schedule for 2019–20 UEFA Youth League
Phase	Round	Draw date	First leg	Second leg
UEFA Champions League Path; Group stage	Matchday 1	29 August 2019 (Monaco)	17–18 September 2019	
UEFA Champions League Path; Group stage	Matchday 2	29 August 2019 (Monaco)	1–2 October 2019	
UEFA Champions League Path; Group stage	Matchday 3	29 August 2019 (Monaco)	22–23 October 2019	
UEFA Champions League Path; Group stage	Matchday 4	29 August 2019 (Monaco)	5–6 November 2019	
UEFA Champions League Path; Group stage	Matchday 5	29 August 2019 (Monaco)	26–27 November 2019	
UEFA Champions League Path; Group stage	Matchday 6	29 August 2019 (Monaco)	10–11 December 2019	
Domestic Champions Path	First round	3 September 2019	2 October 2019	23 October 2019
Domestic Champions Path	Second round	3 September 2019	6 November 2019	27 November 2019
Knockout phase	Knockout round play-offs	16 December 2019	11–12 February 2020	
Knockout phase	Round of 16	14 February 2020	3–4 March 2020; 10 March 2020 (Note: One round of 16 match postponed due to COVID-19 pandemic in Europe); 16 August 2020 at Colovray Stadium, Nyon (Note: Two round of 16 matches postponed and relocated due to COVID-19 pandemic in Europe)	
Knockout phase	Quarter-finals	14 February 2020	18–19 August 2020 at Colovray Stadium, Nyon (Note: Quarter-finals originally scheduled for 17–18 March 2020, but postponed and relocated due to COVID-19 pandemic in Europe)	
Knockout phase	Semi-finals	14 February 2020	22 August 2020 at Colovray Stadium, Nyon (Note: Semi-finals originally scheduled for 17 April 2020, but postponed due to COVID-19 pandemic in Europe)	
Knockout phase	Final	14 February 2020	25 August 2020 at Colovray Stadium, Nyon (Note: Final originally scheduled for 20 April 2020, but postponed due to COVID-19 pandemic in Europe)	

== UEFA Champions League Path ==
For the UEFA Champions League Path, the 32 teams were drawn into eight groups of four. There was no separate draw held, with the group compositions identical to the draw for the 2019–20 UEFA Champions League group stage, which was held on 29 August 2019, 18:00 CEST, at the Grimaldi Forum in Monaco.

In each group, teams played against each other home-and-away in a round-robin format. The group winners advanced to the round of 16, while the eight runners-up advanced to the play-offs, where they were joined by the eight second round winners from the Domestic Champions Path. The matchdays were 17–18 September, 1–2 October, 22–23 October, 5–6 November, 26–27 November, and 10–11 December 2019.

Tiebreakers
Teams were ranked according to points (3 points for a win, 1 point for a draw, 0 points for a loss), and if tied on points, the following tiebreaking criteria were applied, in the order given, to determine the rankings (Regulations Articles 14.03):
1. Points in head-to-head matches among tied teams;
2. Goal difference in head-to-head matches among tied teams;
3. Goals scored in head-to-head matches among tied teams;
4. Away goals scored in head-to-head matches among tied teams;
5. If more than two teams were tied, and after applying all head-to-head criteria above, a subset of teams were still tied, all head-to-head criteria above were reapplied exclusively to this subset of teams;
6. Goal difference in all group matches;
7. Goals scored in all group matches;
8. Away goals scored in all group matches;
9. Wins in all group matches;
10. Away wins in all group matches;
11. Disciplinary points (red card = 3 points, yellow card = 1 point, expulsion for two yellow cards in one match = 3 points);
12. Drawing of lots.

=== Group A ===
Pos	Team	Pld	W	D	L	GF	GA	GD	Pts	Qualification	RMA	BRU	PAR	GAL
1	(Spain) Real Madrid	6	4	1	1	16	10	+6	13	Round of 16	—	3–0	6–3	2–4
2	(Belgium) Club Brugge	6	3	1	2	12	9	+3	10	Play-offs	2–2	—	2–0	3–2
3	(France) Paris Saint-Germain	6	2	0	4	10	15	−5	6 (Note: Ranked on head-to-head points: Paris Saint-Germain 6, Galatasaray 0.)		1–2	0–4	—	1–0
4	(Turkey) Galatasaray	6	2	0	4	9	13	−4	6		0–1	2–1	1–5	—

Source: UEFA

=== Group B ===
Pos	Team	Pld	W	D	L	GF	GA	GD	Pts	Qualification	BAY	RSB	TOT	OLY
1	(Germany) Bayern Munich	6	4	2	0	18	2	+16	14	Round of 16	—	0–0	3–0	6–0
2	(Serbia) Red Star Belgrade	6	3	2	1	8	11	−3	11	Play-offs	1–1	—	2–0	2–1
3	(England) Tottenham Hotspur	6	2	1	3	12	12	0	7		1–4	9–2	—	1–0
4	(Greece) Olympiacos	6	0	1	5	2	15	−13	1		0–4	0–1	1–1	—

Source: UEFA

=== Group C ===
Pos	Team	Pld	W	D	L	GF	GA	GD	Pts	Qualification	ATA	DZG	MCI	SHK
1	(Italy) Atalanta	6	4	1	1	10	5	+5	13	Round of 16	—	2–0	1–0	2–2
2	(Croatia) Dinamo Zagreb	6	3	2	1	6	5	+1	11	Play-offs	1–0	—	1–0	1–0
3	(England) Manchester City	6	2	1	3	11	8	+3	7		1–3	2–2	—	5–0
4	(Ukraine) Shakhtar Donetsk	6	0	2	4	5	14	−9	2		1–2	1–1	1–3	—

Source: UEFA

=== Group D ===
Pos	Team	Pld	W	D	L	GF	GA	GD	Pts	Qualification	JUV	ATM	LEV	LMO
1	(Italy) Juventus	6	5	0	1	17	4	+13	15	Round of 16	—	2–1	4–1	1–2
2	(Spain) Atlético Madrid	6	4	0	2	11	8	+3	12	Play-offs	0–4	—	2–0	3–0
3	(Germany) Bayer Leverkusen	6	1	1	4	6	16	−10	4 (Note: Ranked on head-to-head points: Bayer Leverkusen 4, Lokomotiv Moscow 1.)		0–5	0–2	—	2–2
4	(Russia) Lokomotiv Moscow	6	1	1	4	7	13	−6	4		0–1	2–3	1–3	—

Source: UEFA

=== Group E ===
Pos	Team	Pld	W	D	L	GF	GA	GD	Pts	Qualification	LIV	SAL	GNK	NAP
1	(England) Liverpool	6	4	1	1	17	6	+11	13	Round of 16	—	4–2	0–1	7–0
2	(Austria) Red Bull Salzburg	6	3	1	2	19	11	+8	10	Play-offs	2–3	—	1–1	7–2
3	(Belgium) Genk	6	2	2	2	5	6	−1	8		0–2	0–2	—	3–1
4	(Italy) Napoli	6	0	2	4	5	23	−18	2		1–1	1–5	0–0	—

Source: UEFA

=== Group F ===
Pos	Team	Pld	W	D	L	GF	GA	GD	Pts	Qualification	INT	DOR	SLP	BAR
1	(Italy) Inter Milan	6	4	0	2	15	7	+8	12 (Note: Tied on head-to-head points (3). Ranked on head-to-head goal difference: Inter Milan +2, Borussia Dortmund −2.)	Round of 16	—	4–1	4–0	2–0
2	(Germany) Borussia Dortmund	6	4	0	2	12	9	+3	12	Play-offs	2–1	—	5–1	2–1
3	(Czech Republic) Slavia Prague	6	3	0	3	9	16	−7	9		4–1	1–0	—	0–4
4	(Spain) Barcelona	6	1	0	5	8	12	−4	3		0–3	1–2	2–3	—

Source: UEFA

=== Group G ===
Pos	Team	Pld	W	D	L	GF	GA	GD	Pts	Qualification	BEN	LYO	RBL	ZEN
1	(Portugal) Benfica	6	5	0	1	17	6	+11	15	Round of 16	—	1–2	2–1	1–0
2	(France) Lyon	6	4	0	2	13	10	+3	12	Play-offs	2–3	—	1–0	4–2
3	(Germany) RB Leipzig	6	1	1	4	5	10	−5	4 (Note: Ranked on head-to-head points: RB Leipzig 4, Zenit Saint Petersburg 1.)		0–3	1–3	—	1–1
4	(Russia) Zenit Saint Petersburg	6	1	1	4	7	16	−9	4		1–7	3–1	0–2	—

Source: UEFA

=== Group H ===
Pos	Team	Pld	W	D	L	GF	GA	GD	Pts	Qualification	AJX	LIL	CHE	VAL
1	(Netherlands) Ajax	6	3	2	1	13	7	+6	11	Round of 16	—	4–0	0–1	1–1
2	(France) Lille	6	3	1	2	7	8	−1	10	Play-offs	1–2	—	2–0	1–0
3	(England) Chelsea	6	1	3	2	7	9	−2	6		1–1	1–1	—	3–3
4	(Spain) Valencia	6	1	2	3	10	13	−3	5		3–5	1–2	2–1	—

Source: UEFA

== Domestic Champions Path ==
For the Domestic Champions Path, the 32 teams were drawn into two rounds of two-legged home-and-away ties. The draw for both the first round and second round was held on 3 September 2019, 14:00 CEST, at the UEFA headquarters in Nyon, Switzerland. There were no seedings, but the 32 teams were split into groups defined by sporting and geographical criteria prior to the draw.

In both rounds, if the aggregate score was tied after full-time of the second leg, the away goals rule was used to decide the winner. If still tied, the match was decided by a penalty shoot-out (no extra time was played). The eight second round winners advanced to the play-offs, where they were joined by the eight group runners-up from the UEFA Champions League Path (group stage).

=== First round ===
The first legs were played on 2, 3, 5 and 9 October, and the second legs were played from 22–24 October 2019.

Team 1	Agg.	Team 2	1st leg	2nd leg
APOEL (Cyprus)	2–1 (Note: Order of legs reversed after original draw.)	(Azerbaijan) Gabala	1–1	1–0
Shkëndija Tiranë (Albania)	1–3	(Moldova) Sheriff Tiraspol	1–2	0–1
MTK Budapest (Hungary)	1–3	(Bosnia and Herzegovina) Zrinjski Mostar	1–1	0–2
Zaragoza (Spain)	5–1	(Poland) Korona Kielce	1–0	4–1
Minsk (Belarus)	2–9	(England) Derby County	0–2	2–7
IF Elfsborg (Sweden)	1–3	(Denmark) Midtjylland	1–2	0–1
Sogndal (Norway)	4–2	(Finland) Honka	3–1	1–1
ÍA (Iceland)	16–1	(Estonia) FCI Levadia	4–0	12–1
Bohemians (Republic of Ireland)	1–2	(Greece) PAOK	1–1	0–1
Rennes (France)	2–1	(Serbia) Brodarac	2–1	0–0
Young Boys (Switzerland)	5–5 (a)	(Scotland) Rangers	3–3	2–2
Porto (Portugal)	7–2	(Latvia) Liepāja	4–2	3–0
Viitorul Constanța (Romania)	0–2	(Slovenia) Domžale	0–0	0–2
Slovan Bratislava (Slovakia)	1–1 (4–2 p)	(Bulgaria) Ludogorets Razgrad	1–0	0–1
Dynamo Kyiv (Ukraine)	10–2	(North Macedonia) Shkëndija	8–0	2–2
Astana (Kazakhstan)	1–4	(Israel) Maccabi Petah Tikva	1–0	0–4

=== Second round ===
The first legs were played on 4 and 6 November, and the second legs were played from 26–27 November and 4 December 2019.

Team 1	Agg.	Team 2	1st leg	2nd leg
Sheriff Tiraspol (Moldova)	3–3 (a)	(Norway) Sogndal	2–0	1–3
Zaragoza (Spain)	9–0	(Cyprus) APOEL	5–0	4–0
Midtjylland (Denmark)	3–1	(Bosnia and Herzegovina) Zrinjski Mostar	3–1	0–0
ÍA (Iceland)	2–6	(England) Derby County	1–2	1–4
Porto (Portugal)	5–2	(Slovenia) Domžale	2–2	3–0
Dynamo Kyiv (Ukraine)	5–2	(Greece) PAOK	3–0	2–2
Rangers (Scotland)	4–1	(Slovakia) Slovan Bratislava	2–0	2–1
Rennes (France)	3–0	(Israel) Maccabi Petah Tikva	2–0	1–0

== Knockout phase ==
The draw for the round of 16 onwards was held on 14 February 2020, 13:00 CET (UTC+1), at the UEFA headquarters in Nyon, Switzerland. The mechanism of the draws for each round was as follows:

- In the draw for the round of 16, there were no seedings, and the sixteen teams (eight UEFA Champions League Path group winners and eight play-off winners) were drawn into eight ties. Teams from the same UEFA Champions League Path group could not be drawn against each other, but teams from the same association could be drawn against each other. The draw also decided the home team for each round of 16 match.
- In the draws for the quarter-finals onwards, there were no seedings, and teams from the same UEFA Champions League Path group or the same association could be drawn against each other (the identity of the quarter-final winners and onwards was not known at the time of the draws). The draws also decided the home team for each quarter-final, and which quarter-final and semi-final winners were designated as the "home" team for each semi-final and final (for administrative purposes as they were played at a neutral venue).

Each tie was played over a single match. If the score was level after full-time, the match was decided by a penalty shoot-out (no extra time was played).

=== Bracket ===
Knockout round play-offs
(Ukraine) Dynamo Kyiv	0 (3)
(Croatia) Dinamo Zagreb (p)	0 (4)
(Moldova) Sheriff Tiraspol	0 (2)
(Serbia) Red Star Belgrade (p)	0 (4)
(Denmark) Midtjylland (p)	1 (7)
(France) Lille	1 (6)
(Scotland) Rangers	0
(Spain) Atlético Madrid	4
(Portugal) Porto	1 (6)
(Austria) Red Bull Salzburg (p)	1 (7)
(England) Derby County	3
(Germany) Borussia Dortmund	1
(Spain) Zaragoza	1
(France) Lyon	3
(France) Rennes (p)	1 (5)
(Belgium) Club Brugge	1 (3)

Round of 16
(Germany) Bayern Munich	2 (5)
(Croatia) Dinamo Zagreb (p)	2 (6)
(Portugal) Benfica	4
(England) Liverpool	1
(Serbia) Red Star Belgrade	0
(Denmark) Midtjylland	3
(Netherlands) Ajax (p)	0 (6)
(Spain) Atlético Madrid	0 (5)
(Austria) Red Bull Salzburg	4
(England) Derby County	1
(Italy) Atalanta	3 (3)
(France) Lyon (p)	3 (5)
(Italy) Inter Milan	1
(France) Rennes	0
(Italy) Juventus	1
(Spain) Real Madrid	3

Quarter-finals
18 August – Nyon
(Croatia) Dinamo Zagreb	1
(Portugal) Benfica	3
18 August – Nyon
(Denmark) Midtjylland	1
(Netherlands) Ajax	3
19 August – Nyon
(Austria) Red Bull Salzburg	4
(France) Lyon	3
19 August – Nyon
(Italy) Inter Milan	0
(Spain) Real Madrid	3

Semi-finals
22 August – Nyon
(Portugal) Benfica	3
(Netherlands) Ajax	0
22 August – Nyon
(Austria) Red Bull Salzburg	1
(Spain) Real Madrid	2

Final
25 August – Nyon
(Portugal) Benfica	2
(Spain) Real Madrid	3

=== Knockout round play-offs ===
The draw for the knockout round play-offs was held on 16 December 2019, 14:00 CET (UTC+1), at the UEFA headquarters in Nyon, Switzerland. The eight second round winners from the Domestic Champions Path were drawn against the eight group runners-up from the UEFA Champions League Path, with the teams from the Domestic Champions Path hosting the match. Teams from the same association could not be drawn against each other. Each tie was played over a single match. If the score was level after full-time, the match was decided by a penalty shoot-out (no extra time was played). The matches were played on 11 and 12 February 2020. The eight play-off winners advanced to the round of 16, where they were joined by the eight group winners from the UEFA Champions League Path.

Home team	Score	Away team
Derby County (England)	3–1	(Germany) Borussia Dortmund
Porto (Portugal)	1–1 (6–7 p)	(Austria) Red Bull Salzburg
Zaragoza (Spain)	1–3	(France) Lyon
Dynamo Kyiv (Ukraine)	0–0 (3–4 p)	(Croatia) Dinamo Zagreb
Sheriff Tiraspol (Moldova)	0–0 (2–4 p)	(Serbia) Red Star Belgrade
Rangers (Scotland)	0–4	(Spain) Atlético Madrid
Midtjylland (Denmark)	1–1 (7–6 p)	(France) Lille
Rennes (France)	1–1 (5–3 p)	(Belgium) Club Brugge

=== Round of 16 ===
Six of the eight round of 16 matches were played on 3, 4 and 10 March 2020, while the remaining two matches could not be played as scheduled due to concerns over the COVID-19 pandemic in Europe. They were rescheduled to 16 August 2020 at Colovray Stadium, Nyon.

Home team	Score	Away team
Bayern Munich (Germany)	2–2 (5–6 p)	(Croatia) Dinamo Zagreb
Ajax (Netherlands)	0–0 (6–5 p)	(Spain) Atlético Madrid
Atalanta (Italy)	3–3 (3–5 p)	(France) Lyon
Inter Milan (Italy)	1–0	(France) Rennes
Red Bull Salzburg (Austria)	4–1	(England) Derby County
Benfica (Portugal)	4–1	(England) Liverpool
Red Star Belgrade (Serbia)	0–3	(Denmark) Midtjylland
Juventus (Italy)	1–3	(Spain) Real Madrid

=== Quarter-finals ===
The quarter-finals, originally scheduled to be played on 17 and 18 March 2020, were postponed due to concerns over the COVID-19 pandemic in Europe. They were rescheduled to 18 and 19 August 2020 at Colovray Stadium, Nyon.

Team 1	Score	Team 2
Inter Milan (Italy)	0–3	(Spain) Real Madrid
Red Bull Salzburg (Austria)	4–3	(France) Lyon
Midtjylland (Denmark)	1–3	(Netherlands) Ajax
Dinamo Zagreb (Croatia)	1–3	(Portugal) Benfica

=== Semi-finals ===
The semi-finals, originally scheduled to be played on 17 April 2020 at Colovray Stadium, Nyon, were postponed due to concerns over the COVID-19 pandemic in Europe. They were rescheduled to 22 August 2020.

Team 1	Score	Team 2
Benfica (Portugal)	3–0	(Netherlands) Ajax
Red Bull Salzburg (Austria)	1–2	(Spain) Real Madrid

=== Final ===
The final, originally scheduled to be played on 20 April 2020 at Colovray Stadium, Nyon, was postponed due to concerns over the COVID-19 pandemic in Europe. It was rescheduled to 25 August 2020.

25 August 2020
18:00 UTC+2

Benfica (Portugal)	2–3	(Spain) Real Madrid
Ramos 49', 57'	Report	Rodríguez 26'; Jocú 45' (o.g.); Gutiérrez 50'

Colovray Stadium, Nyon
Attendance: 0 (Note: The remainder of the competition, held in August 2020, was played behind closed doors due to the COVID-19 pandemic in Europe.)
Referee: Chris Kavanagh (England)

== Statistics ==
=== Top goalscorers ===
There were 554 goals scored in 167 matches, for an average of 3.32 goals per match.

Rank	Player	Team	Goals			
Rank	Player	Team	GS	DC	KO	Total
1	(Italy) Roberto Piccoli	(Italy) Atalanta	6	—	2	8
1	(Portugal) Gonçalo Ramos	(Portugal) Benfica	2	—	6	8
3	(Austria) Chukwubuike Adamu	(Austria) Red Bull Salzburg	1	—	5	6
3	(Republic of Ireland) Troy Parrott	(England) Tottenham Hotspur	6	—	—	6
3	(Croatia) Luka Sučić	(Austria) Red Bull Salzburg	4	—	2	6
6	(France) Rayan Cherki	(France) Lyon	4	—	1	5
6	(Portugal) Tiago Dantas	(Portugal) Benfica	3	—	2	5
6	(England) Curtis Jones	(England) Liverpool	5	—	0	5
6	(Netherlands) Youri Regeer	(Netherlands) Ajax	5	—	0	5
6	(England) Morgan Whittaker	(England) Derby County	—	5	0	5

Notes

- — denotes the team did not participate in this stage.
