= Alexander Tóth =

Slovak footballer

Personal information
- Full name: Alexander Tóth
- Date of birth: 4 August 2001 (age 25)
- Place of birth: Slovakia
- Height: 1.78 m (5 ft 10 in)
- Positions: Midfielder; right-back

Team information
- Current team: Inter Bratislava
- Number: 9

Youth career
- 2009–2012: SFM Senec
- 2012–2020: Slovan Bratislava

Senior career*
| Years | Team | Apps | (Gls) |
| 2019–2020 | Slovan Bratislava B | 9 | (0) |
| 2021 | Orion Tip Sereď | 1 | (0) |
| 2022–2025 | Slovan Bratislava B | 83 | (4) |
| 2025- | Inter Bratislava | 22 | (0) |

International career^{‡}
| 2019 | Slovakia U18 | 1 | (0) |
| 2019 | Slovakia U19 | 5 | (0) |
- * Club domestic league appearances and goals as of 25 May 2026 ‡ National team caps and goals as of 28 March 2021

Alexander Tóth (born 4 August 2001) is a professional Slovak footballer who plays as a midfielder for FK Inter Bratislava.

== Club career ==
=== ŠKF Sereď ===
Tóth made his Fortuna Liga debut for Sereď against his former employer, Slovan Bratislava on 28 February 2021 in ViOn Aréna. Tóth came in as a second-half replacement for Denis Potoma, who too played in Slovan, after 84 minutes of play, with the score at 0:4 for Belasí. During his tenure on the pitch Erik Daniel scored the match's final goal sealing the 0:5 win for the reigning champions.
