= Franck Rivollier =

French professional footballer

Personal information
- Full name: Franck Rivollier Nkolo
- Date of birth: 20 April 2001 (age 25)
- Place of birth: Saint-Étienne, France
- Height: 1.92 m (6 ft 3 1/2 in)
- Position: Forward

Team information
- Current team: Maccabi Petah Tikva
- Number: 45

Youth career
- 2009–2011: Castelnau Le Crès
- 2012–2013: Rivière-de-Corps
- 2013–2014: Troyes
- 2014–2017: Olympique Lyonnais
- 2017–2019: GS Saint-Aunès

Senior career*
Years	Team	Apps	(Gls)
2019	Lyon B	2	(0)
2019–2022	Stade Rennais B	20	(7)
2021–2022	→ Stade Briochin	20	(0)
2022–2023	Olympic Charleroi	23	(7)
2023–2024	Hapoel Afula	33	(11)
2024–2025	Spartak Varna	14	(0)
2025	Hapoel Petah Tikva	19	(4)
2025–	Maccabi Petah Tikva	32	(6)
- * Club domestic league appearances and goals as of 24 June 2026

Franck Rivollier (born 20 April 2001) is a French professional footballer who plays as a Forward for Israeli club Maccabi Petah Tikva.

== Career ==
On 5 August 2021 Rivollier loaned for Championnat National club Stade Briochin. On 17 August 2019 made his debut to the 1-1 draw against GSI Pontivy. On 1 September 2022, he signed for Belgian Division 3 club Olympic Charleroi. On 17 July 2023, he signed for Liga Leumit club Hapoel Afula. For Afula scored 11 goals in 34 appearances. On 19 July 2025 returned to Liga Leumit and signed for Hapoel Petah Tikva.
