= Dynamo Kyiv junior squads and Academy =

Coordinates: 50.4739°N 30.4181°E

Dynamo Kyiv
- Full name: Dynamo Kyiv junior squads Dynamo Children-Youth Football School of Valeriy Lobanovsky
- Founded: 1961; 1957
- Ground: Koncha Zaspa Training Center; Training grounds Nyvky
- President: Ihor Surkis
- Base director: Mykola Severylov
- Head coach: Oleksandr Ishchenko
- League: Ukrainian Premier League under-19 Ukrainian Youth Football League
- Website: http://www.fcdynamo.kiev.ua/ua/school/info/

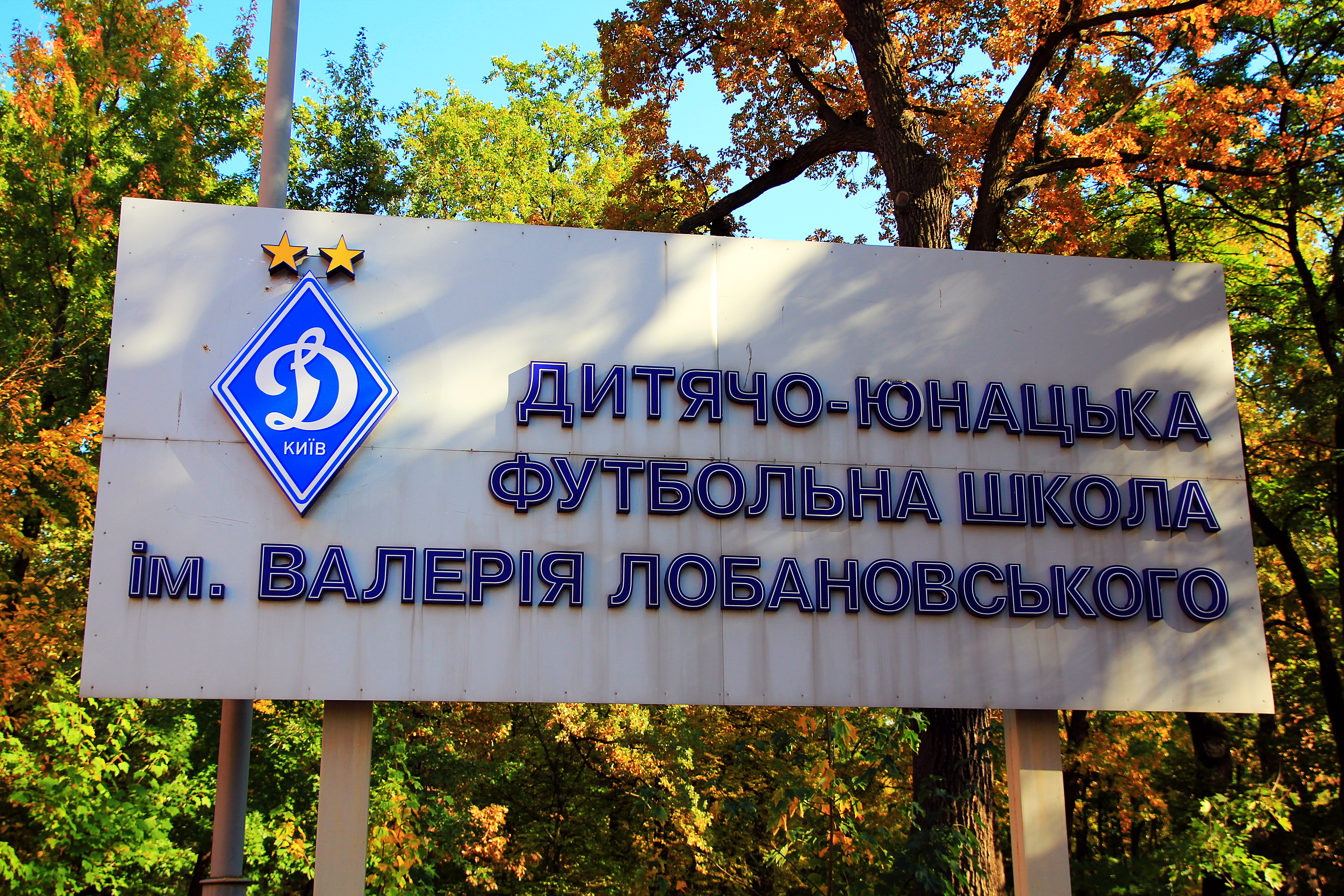

The Dynamo Kyiv junior squads and Academy includes several junior teams of FC Dynamo Kyiv youth system. Besides some reserve teams that competed in lower leagues, the club also has junior teams that participate in competitions under-21 and under-19 of the Ukrainian Premier League. In additions to that the club also has its own football academy (school) that exists since 1957.

The Dynamo Kyiv junior squads under-21 and under-19 along with the club's reserves (Dynamo-2 and Dynamo-3) are based out of the club's training base located at southern outskirts of Kyiv, Koncha-Zaspa, while the football academy (school) is located in the western part of the city known as Nyvky.

== Dynamo Kyiv children-youth football school of Valeriy Lobanovsky ==
The children-youth football school Dynamo Kyiv of Valeriy Lobanovsky (Ukrainian: Дитячо-юнацька футбольна школа Динамо ім. Валерія Васильовича Лобановського) is a football school (academy) of Dynamo Kyiv. The club operates the academy for boys from the age of seven upwards. The school is located in residential area of western parts of Kyiv known as Nyvky.

Unlike the club's older junior squads that competed in parallel competitions of the Ukrainian Premier League, the school fields teams in following age categories in the Ukrainian Youth Football League, U-14, U-15, U-16, and U-17. The earlier age category teams participate in the regional city competitions.

The graduates of senior squad, U-17, get promoted to the youth (U-21 and U-19) squads which play in separate youth competition organized by the Ukrainian Premier League.

== Squads ==
=== Under-21 and doubles ===
The section existed since the introduction of Doubles Championship for the Soviet Football Championship Pervaya Gruppa (precursor of the Soviet Top League) in 1946.

After dissolution of the Soviet Union and liquidation of the Soviet Top League, in 1992 Dynamo joined Ukrainian Top League. The competitions for junior squads were discontinued, instead there was created a reserve team which entered competition in lower leagues.

In 2004 competitions among youth squads were resumed later transforming into competitions among under-21 squads. In 2021 these competitions were discontinued once again.

=== Under-19 ===
In 2012 the Ukrainian Premier League created competition for under-19 squads which ran parallel with the championship of first squads and the championship of under-21 squads, three simultaneous competitions.

Note: Flags indicate national team as defined under FIFA eligibility rules; some limited exceptions apply. Players may hold more than one non-FIFA nationality.

No.	Pos.	Nation	Player
74	GK	UKR	Denys Ihnatenko
—	GK	UKR	Yuriy Avramenko
—	DF	UKR	Arseniy Filatov
—	DF	UKR	Artem Bendyuk
—	DF	UKR	Yehor Syzonyuk
—	DF	UKR	Vladyslav Eremenko
—	DF	UKR	Nazar Balaba
—	DF	UKR	Ivan Kotykha
3	DF	UKR	Anton Bol
90	DF	UKR	Oleksiy Husiev
—	MF	UKR	Artem Slesar
—	MF	UKR	Maksym Vasylets
—	MF	UKR	Artem Hrokholskyi

No.	Pos.	Nation	Player
—	MF	UKR	Roman Salenko
—	MF	UKR	Nazar Yanchyshyn
—	MF	UKR	Andriy Matkevych
—	MF	UKR	Maksym Boychenyuk
—	MF	UKR	Maksym Teterya
14	MF	UKR	Oleksandr Yatsyk
23	DF	UKR	Navin Malysh
30	MF	SEN	Samba Diallo
37	MF	UKR	Anton Tsarenko
—	FW	UKR	Ihor Horbach
—	FW	UKR	Dmytro Kremchanin
—	FW	UKR	Maksym Zorenko

== Honors ==
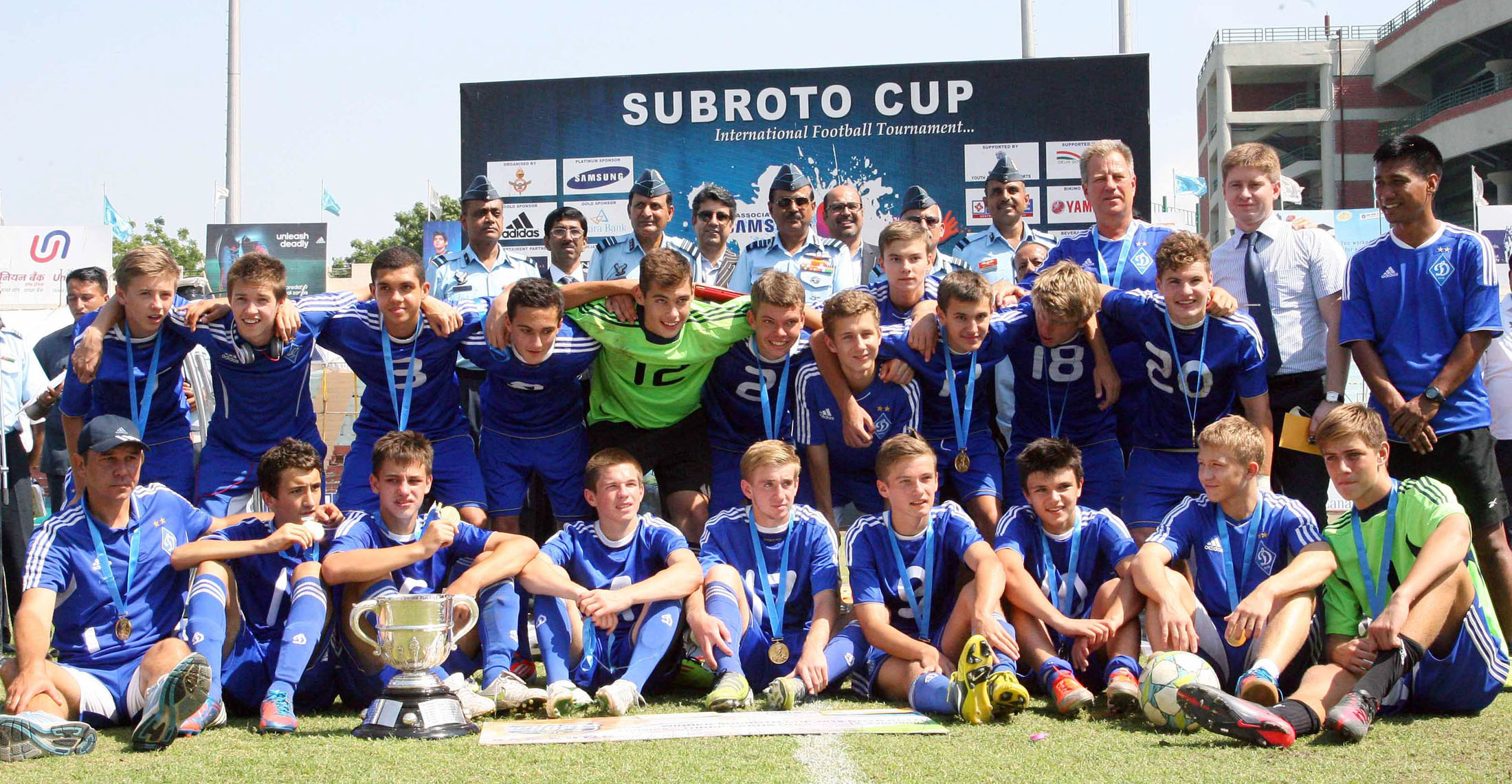
Dynamo Kiev U-17 players celebrating with Subroto Cup trophy at the Ambedkar Stadium in October 2012

=== Domestic ===
- Doubles championship
  - Champions: 1949, 1963, 1965, 1966, 1968, 1972, 1974, 1976, 1977, 1980, 1981, 1982, 1983, 1985, 1990
  - Runners-up: 1952, 1962, 1964, 1967, 1984, 1988
- U-21 (youth)/doubles championship
  - Champions: 2004–05, 2005–06, 2006–07, 2007–08, 2015–16, 2016–17, 2018–19, 2020–21
  - Runners-up: 2008–09, 2012–13, 2014–15, 2017–18, (2019–20)
- U-19 championship
  - Champions: 2012–13, 2015–16, 2016–17, 2017–18, 2018–19, (2019–20)
  - Runners-up: 2014–15, 2020–21, 2021–22, 2022–23
- U-17 championship
  - Champions: 1998–99, 2009-10 (group 1), 2013-14
- U-16 championship
  - Runners-up: 1999-2000

=== International ===
- Subroto Cup (India)
  - Champions: 2017

== European record ==
Dynamo Kyiv under-19 team made their debut on September 16, 2015, when it played its first game against Porto under-19 team during the 2015–16 UEFA Youth League. The first goal in European competitions was scored by Rostyslav Taranukha, who at the time was also a player of the Ukraine national under-19 football team.

Season	Competition	Round	Opponent	Home	Away	Aggregate	
2015–16	UEFA Youth League	Group Stage (Group G)	(England) Chelsea	0–2	1–3	Second place	
2015–16	UEFA Youth League	Group Stage (Group G)	(Portugal) Porto	2–1	1–0	Second place	
2015–16	UEFA Youth League	Group Stage (Group G)	(Israel) Maccabi Tel Aviv	2–0	1–1	Second place	
2015–16	UEFA Youth League	Knockout round play-offs	(England) Middlesbrough		0–5	0–5	
2016–17	UEFA Youth League	Group Stage (Group B)	(Portugal) Benfica	2–1	2–1	First place	
2016–17	UEFA Youth League	Group Stage (Group B)	(Italy) Napoli	4–1	2–0	First place	
2016–17	UEFA Youth League	Group Stage (Group B)	(Turkey) Beşiktaş	3–1	3–3	First place	
2016–17	UEFA Youth League	Round of 16	(Netherlands) Ajax		0–3	0–3	
2017–18	UEFA Youth League	First round (Champions Path)	(Italy) Internazionale	0–3	2–2	2–5	
2018–19	UEFA Youth League	First round (Champions Path)	(Bulgaria) Septemvri Sofia	1–0	5–1	6–1	
2018–19	UEFA Youth League	Second round (Champions Path)	(Belgium) Anderlecht	2–1	1–1	3–2	
2018–19	UEFA Youth League	Knockout round play-offs	(Italy) Juventus	3–0		3–0	
2018–19	UEFA Youth League	Round of 16	(Germany) TSG Hoffenheim	0–0 (2–4 p)		0–0 (2–4 p)	
2019–20	UEFA Youth League	First round (Champions Path)	(North Macedonia) Shkëndija	8–0	2–2	10–2	
2019–20	UEFA Youth League	Second round (Champions Path)	(Greece) PAOK	3–0	2–2	5–2	
2019–20	UEFA Youth League	Knockout round play-offs	(Croatia) Dinamo Zagreb	0–0 (3–4 p)		0–0 (3–4 p)	
2020–21	UEFA Youth League	Round of 64 (Champions League)	(Spain) Barcelona	~~v~~		canceled	–
2021–22	UEFA Youth League	Group Stage (Group E)	(Portugal) Benfica	4–0	0–1	Second place	
2021–22	UEFA Youth League	Group Stage (Group E)	(Spain) Barcelona	4–1	0–0	Second place	
2021–22	UEFA Youth League	Group Stage (Group E)	(Germany) Bayern Munich	2–1	4–0	Second place	
2021–22	UEFA Youth League	Knockout round play-offs	(Spain) Deportivo La Coruña		2–2 (3–2 p)	2–2 (3–2 p)	
2021–22	UEFA Youth League	Round of 16	(Portugal) Sporting CP	1–2		1–2	
2024–25	UEFA Youth League	Second round (Champions Path)	(Slovenia) Maribor	1–1	3–1	4–2	
2024–25	UEFA Youth League	Third round (Champions Path)	(Kosovo) 2 Korriku	5–0	4–1	3–2	
2024–25	UEFA Youth League	Round of 32	(Italy) Atalanta	3–3 (6–7 p)		3–3 (6–7 p)	
2025–26	UEFA Youth League	Second round (Champions Path)	(Sweden) Brommapojkarna	1–0	2–1	3–1	
2025–26	UEFA Youth League	Third round (Champions Path)	(Scotland) Hibernian	1–0	1–1	2–1	
2025–26	UEFA Youth League	Round of 32	(Spain) Atlético Madrid	TBD		TBD	TBD
