= Velislav Minkov =

Bulgarian footballer

Personal information
- Full name: Velislav Veskov Minkov
- Date of birth: 29 May 2001 (age 25)
- Place of birth: Troyan, Bulgaria
- Height: 1.77 m (5 ft 10 in)
- Position: Midfielder

Team information
- Current team: Troyan

Youth career
- –2014: Chavdar Troyan
- 2014–2020: Ludogorets Razgrad

Senior career*
Years	Team	Apps	(Gls)
2019–2023	Ludogorets Razgrad II	102	(6)
2023–2024	Pirin Blagoevgrad	8	(0)
2024	Spartak Varna	4	(0)
2025–	Troyan	10	(1)
- * Club domestic league appearances and goals as of 14:55, 25 March 2026 (UTC)

Velislav Minkov (Bulgarian: Велислав Минков; born 29 May 2001) is a Bulgarian footballer who plays as a midfielder for Troyan.

== Career ==
Velislav started his career in the local Chavdar Troyan academy, before joining Ludogorets Razgrad in 2014. Since 2019 he become a regular playef of Ludogorets Razgrad II, taking the captain armband in 2021. On 3 July 2023 Minkov left Ludogorets and signed a contract with First League team of Pirin Blagoevgrad. He left the club in January 2024. Minkov signed a long-term contract with Spartak Varna on 16 January 2024.
