= 2017–18 UEFA Youth League group stage =

Football tournament group stage

The 2017–18 UEFA Youth League UEFA Champions League Path (group stage) was played from 12 September to 6 December 2017. A total of 32 teams competed in the UEFA Champions League Path (group stage) to decide 16 of the 24 places in the knockout phase of the 2017–18 UEFA Youth League.

== Draw ==
The youth teams of the 32 clubs which qualified for the 2017–18 UEFA Champions League group stage entered the UEFA Champions League Path. If there was a vacancy (youth teams not entering), it was filled by a team defined by UEFA.

For the UEFA Champions League Path, the 32 teams were drawn into eight groups of four. There was no separate draw held, with the group compositions identical to the draw for the 2017–18 UEFA Champions League group stage, which was held on 24 August 2017, 18:00 CEST, at the Grimaldi Forum in Monaco.

Key to colours
Group winners advanced to the round of 16
Group runners-up advanced to the play-offs

Pot 1 Team (Spain) Real Madrid (Germany) Bayern Munich (England) Chelsea (Italy) Juventus (Portugal) Benfica (France) Monaco (Russia) Spartak Moscow (Ukraine) Shakhtar Donetsk	Pot 2 Team (Spain) Barcelona (Spain) Atlético Madrid (France) Paris Saint-Germain (Germany) Borussia Dortmund (Spain) Sevilla (England) Manchester City (Portugal) Porto (England) Manchester United	Pot 3 Team (Italy) Napoli (England) Tottenham Hotspur (Switzerland) Basel (Greece) Olympiacos (Belgium) Anderlecht (England) Liverpool (Italy) Roma (Turkey) Beşiktaş	Pot 4 Team (Scotland) Celtic (Russia) CSKA Moscow (Portugal) Sporting CP (Cyprus) APOEL (Netherlands) Feyenoord (Slovenia) Maribor (Azerbaijan) Qarabağ (Germany) RB Leipzig

== Format ==
In each group, teams played against each other home-and-away in a round-robin format. The eight group winners advanced to the round of 16, while the eight runners-up advanced to the play-offs, where they were joined by the eight second round winners from the Domestic Champions Path.

=== Tiebreakers ===
Teams were ranked according to points (3 points for a win, 1 point for a draw, 0 points for a loss), and if tied on points, the following tiebreaking criteria were applied, in the order given, to determine the rankings (Regulations Articles 14.03):

1. Points in head-to-head matches among tied teams;
2. Goal difference in head-to-head matches among tied teams;
3. Goals scored in head-to-head matches among tied teams;
4. Away goals scored in head-to-head matches among tied teams;
5. If more than two teams are tied, and after applying all head-to-head criteria above, a subset of teams are still tied, all head-to-head criteria above are reapplied exclusively to this subset of teams;
6. Goal difference in all group matches;
7. Goals scored in all group matches;
8. Away goals scored in all group matches;
9. Wins in all group matches;
10. Away wins in all group matches;
11. Disciplinary points (red card = 3 points, yellow card = 1 point, expulsion for two yellow cards in one match = 3 points);
12. Drawing of lots.

== Groups ==
The matchdays were 12–13 September, 26–27 September, 17–18 October, 31 October – 1 November, 21–22 November, and 5–6 December 2017.

Times up to 28 October 2017 (matchdays 1–3) were CEST (UTC+2), thereafter (matchdays 4–6) times were CET (UTC+1).

=== Group A ===
Pos	Team	Pld	W	D	L	GF	GA	GD	Pts	Qualification	BSL	MUN	BEN	CSKA
1	(Switzerland) Basel	6	3	2	1	14	11	+3	11 (Note: Head-to-head results: Manchester United 4–3 Basel, Basel 2–1 Manchester United (Basel won on away goals).)	Round of 16	—	2–1	2–2	4–2
2	(England) Manchester United	6	3	2	1	11	9	+2	11	Play-offs	4–3	—	1–1	1–0
3	(Portugal) Benfica	6	1	4	1	10	8	+2	7		0–0	2–2	—	5–1
4	(Russia) CSKA Moscow	6	1	0	5	8	15	−7	3		2–3	1–2	2–0	—

Source: UEFA
Notes:
12 September 2017
14:00

Benfica (Portugal)	5–1	(Russia) CSKA Moscow
Santos 41', 47'; J. Gomes 58'; Jorginho 86'; Embaló 89'	Report	Zhironkin 82'

Futebol Campus, Seixal
Attendance: 466
Referee: Petr Ardeleánu (Czech Republic)
12 September 2017
16:00

Manchester United (England)	4–3	(Switzerland) Basel
Barlow 5'; Boonen 50'; A. Gomes 57' (pen.); Bohui 62' (pen.)	Report	Pululu 14'; Lokaj 58'; Kaiser 66' (pen.)

Leigh Sports Village, Leigh
Attendance: 309
Referee: Keith Kennedy (Northern Ireland)

27 September 2017
13:00

CSKA Moscow (Russia)	1–2	(England) Manchester United
Merenchukov 90'	Report	Barlow 8'; A. Gomes 38'

Oktyabr Stadium Artificial Turf, Moscow
Referee: Juri Frischer (Estonia)
27 September 2017
16:00

Basel (Switzerland)	2–2	(Portugal) Benfica
Vesco 32'; Okafor 53'	Report	Loureiro 22', 90+2'

Leichtathletik Stadion St. Jakob, Basel
Referee: Edin Jakupović (Bosnia and Herzegovina)

18 October 2017
13:00

CSKA Moscow (Russia)	2–3	(Switzerland) Basel
Zhironkin 15'; Zakharov 69'	Report	Vesco 36'; Schmid 46'; Pululu 79'

Oktyabr Stadium Artificial Turf, Moscow
Referee: Filip Glova (Slovakia)
18 October 2017
14:00

Benfica (Portugal)	2–2	(England) Manchester United
Santos 40'; J. Gomes 51'	Report	Bohui 70' (pen.), 89'

Futebol Campus, Seixal
Attendance: 674
Referee: Juan Martínez Munuera (Spain)

31 October 2017
16:00

Basel (Switzerland)	4–2	(Russia) CSKA Moscow
Okafor 32'; Schmid 33'; Pululu 83'; Suter 86'	Report	Oleynikov 73'; Zhironkin 87'

Leichtathletik Stadion St. Jakob, Basel
Referee: Laurent Kopriwa (Luxembourg)
31 October 2017
16:00

Manchester United (England)	1–1	(Portugal) Benfica
Hamilton 3'	Report	Félix 14'

Leigh Sports Village, Leigh
Attendance: 742
Referee: Mads-Kristoffer Kristoffersen (Denmark)

22 November 2017
12:00

CSKA Moscow (Russia)	2–0	(Portugal) Benfica
Matskharashvili 72'; Zhironkin 85'	Report

Oktyabr Stadium Artificial Turf, Moscow
Referee: Ville Nevalainen (Finland)
22 November 2017
16:00

Basel (Switzerland)	2–1	(England) Manchester United
Pululu 59'; Kaiser 66' (pen.)	Report	Warren 70'

Leichtathletik Stadion St. Jakob, Basel
Referee: Srđan Jovanović (Serbia)

5 December 2017
12:00

Benfica (Portugal)	0–0	(Switzerland) Basel
	Report

Futebol Campus, Seixal
Attendance: 276
Referee: Marco Guida (Italy)
5 December 2017
16:00

Manchester United (England)	1–0	(Russia) CSKA Moscow
Bohui 13' (pen.)	Report

Leigh Sports Village, Leigh
Attendance: 613
Referee: Rob Hennessy (Republic of Ireland)

=== Group B ===
Pos	Team	Pld	W	D	L	GF	GA	GD	Pts	Qualification	BAY	PAR	CEL	AND
1	(Germany) Bayern Munich	6	4	2	0	14	6	+8	14	Round of 16	—	3–1	6–2	1–0
2	(France) Paris Saint-Germain	6	3	1	2	11	9	+2	10	Play-offs	1–1	—	2–0	2–3
3	(Scotland) Celtic	6	2	0	4	10	15	−5	6		1–2	2–3	—	3–1
4	(Belgium) Anderlecht	6	1	1	4	6	11	−5	4		1–1	0–2	1–2	—

Source: UEFA
12 September 2017
18:00

Bayern Munich (Germany)	1–0	(Belgium) Anderlecht
Wintzheimer 54'	Report

FC Bayern Campus, Munich
Attendance: 300
Referee: Mykola Balakin (Ukraine)
12 September 2017
18:00

Celtic (Scotland)	2–3	(France) Paris Saint-Germain
Hendry 13' (pen.); Aitchison 53'	Report	Güçlü 37'; Postolachi 60'; Weah 66'

Dumbarton Football Stadium, Dumbarton
Referee: Alexander Harkam (Austria)

27 September 2017
16:00

Anderlecht (Belgium)	1–2	(Scotland) Celtic
Lokonga 66'	Report	Johnston 3'; Hendry 11'

Van Roy Stadium, Denderleeuw
Referee: Kristo Tohver (Estonia)
27 September 2017
16:00

Paris Saint-Germain (France)	1–1	(Germany) Bayern Munich
Mzaouiyani 62'	Report	Pudic 26'

Stade Municipal Georges Lefèvre, Saint-Germain-en-Laye
Attendance: 450
Referee: Tihomir Pejin (Croatia)

18 October 2017
16:00

Anderlecht (Belgium)	0–2	(France) Paris Saint-Germain
	Report	Güçlü 24'; Bernede 32'

Van Roy Stadium, Denderleeuw
Referee: Fedayi San (Switzerland)
18 October 2017
16:00

Bayern Munich (Germany)	6–2	(Scotland) Celtic
Evina 26'; Götze 31'; Deas 45+1' (o.g.); Pudic 74'; Wintzheimer 85', 90+3'	Report	Johnston 61'; Henderson 69'

FC Bayern Campus, Munich
Attendance: 600
Referee: Ivaylo Stoyanov (Bulgaria)

31 October 2017
16:00

Paris Saint-Germain (France)	2–3	(Belgium) Anderlecht
Diaby 7'; Güçlü 45+3'	Report	Azevedo-Janelas 71' (pen.), 79'; Amuzu 84'

Stade Municipal Georges Lefèvre, Saint-Germain-en-Laye
Attendance: 406
Referee: Irfan Peljto (Bosnia and Herzegovina)
31 October 2017
18:00

Celtic (Scotland)	1–2	(Germany) Bayern Munich
Aitchison 61'	Report	Batista Meier 73', 90+4'

Cappielow Park, Greenock
Referee: Ola Hobber Nilsen (Norway)

22 November 2017
14:00

Paris Saint-Germain (France)	2–0	(Scotland) Celtic
Mbe Soh 78'; Adli 86'	Report

Stade Municipal Georges Lefèvre, Saint-Germain-en-Laye
Attendance: 352
Referee: Pavel Orel (Czech Republic)
22 November 2017
16:00

Anderlecht (Belgium)	1–1	(Germany) Bayern Munich
Azevedo-Janelas 83' (pen.)	Report	Wintzheimer 53' (pen.)

Van Roy Stadium, Denderleeuw
Referee: Alain Durieux (Luxembourg)

5 December 2017
15:00

Celtic (Scotland)	3–1	(Belgium) Anderlecht
Aitchison 23'; McInroy 27'; Johnston 57'	Report	Corryn 73'

Dumbarton Football Stadium, Dumbarton
Referee: Keith Kennedy (Northern Ireland)
5 December 2017
18:00

Bayern Munich (Germany)	3–1	(France) Paris Saint-Germain
Wintzheimer 25'; Shabani 38'; Fein 80'	Report	Postolachi 88'

FC Bayern Campus, Munich
Attendance: 800
Referee: Manuel Schuettengruber (Austria)

=== Group C ===
Pos	Team	Pld	W	D	L	GF	GA	GD	Pts	Qualification	CHE	ATM	ROM	QRB
1	(England) Chelsea	6	5	0	1	17	7	+10	15	Round of 16	—	4–2	0–2	5–0
2	(Spain) Atlético Madrid	6	3	0	3	12	11	+1	9 (Note: Head-to-head results: Roma 1–2 Atlético Madrid, Atlético Madrid 2–1 Roma.)	Play-offs	1–3	—	2–1	0–1
3	(Italy) Roma	6	3	0	3	11	6	+5	9		1–2	1–2	—	3–0
4	(Azerbaijan) Qarabağ	6	1	0	5	3	19	−16	3		1–3	1–5	0–3	—

Source: UEFA
Notes:
12 September 2017
14:05

Chelsea (England)	5–0	(Azerbaijan) Qarabağ
Hudson-Odoi 54'; McCormick 63', 71', 74'; Brown 80'	Report

Cobham Training Centre, Stoke d'Abernon
Attendance: 150
Referee: Rob Hennessy (Republic of Ireland)
12 September 2017
15:00

Roma (Italy)	1–2	(Spain) Atlético Madrid
Masangu 76'	Report	Salido 62'; Navarro 69'

Stadio Tre Fontane, Rome
Attendance: 1,100
Referee: Rade Obrenovic (Slovenia)

27 September 2017
12:00

Qarabağ (Azerbaijan)	0–3	(Italy) Roma
	Report	Celar 11', 60'; Antonucci 77'

Azersun Arena, Baku
Attendance: 200
Referee: Horatiu Fesnic (Romania)
27 September 2017
14:00

Atlético Madrid (Spain)	1–3	(England) Chelsea
Ferni 13' (pen.)	Report	Brown 5'; Sterling 10'; Maddox 28'

Estadio Cerro del Espino, Majadahonda
Attendance: 305
Referee: Kevin Clancy (Scotland)

18 October 2017
12:00

Qarabağ (Azerbaijan)	1–5	(Spain) Atlético Madrid
Deda 18'	Report	Carlos Isaac 8'; Clemente 37'; Moya 44'; Puñal 69'; Salido 88'

Azersun Arena, Baku
Attendance: 300
Referee: Vitali Meshkov (Russia)
18 October 2017
14:00

Chelsea (England)	0–2	(Italy) Roma
	Report	Marcucci 45+1' (pen.); Valeau 58'

Cobham Training Centre, Stoke d'Abernon
Attendance: 135
Referee: Frank Schneider (France)

31 October 2017
15:00

Atlético Madrid (Spain)	0–1	(Azerbaijan) Qarabağ
	Report	Deda 45'

Estadio Cerro del Espino, Majadahonda
Attendance: 153
Referee: Stephan Klossner (Switzerland)
31 October 2017
15:00

Roma (Italy)	1–2	(England) Chelsea
Celar 79'	Report	Sterling 16'; Taylor-Crossdale 21'

Stadio Tre Fontane, Rome
Attendance: 1,200
Referee: Srđan Jovanović (Serbia)

22 November 2017
12:00

Qarabağ (Azerbaijan)	1–3	(England) Chelsea
Deda 50'	Report	Taylor-Crossdale 61' (pen.); Brown 70'; McEachran 76'

Azersun Arena, Baku
Attendance: 225
Referee: Alper Ulusoy (Turkey)
22 November 2017
14:00

Atlético Madrid (Spain)	2–1	(Italy) Roma
Navarro 15', 70'	Report	Cappa 74'

Estadio Cerro del Espino, Majadahonda
Attendance: 291
Referee: Andreas Ekberg (Sweden)

5 December 2017
14:30

Roma (Italy)	3–0	(Azerbaijan) Qarabağ
Sdaigui 19'; Besuijen 36'; D'Orazio 81'	Report

Stadio Tre Fontane, Rome
Attendance: 242
Referee: Tihomir Pejin (Croatia)
5 December 2017
16:00

Chelsea (England)	4–2	(Spain) Atlético Madrid
St Clair 25' (pen.); Familio-Castillo 30', 59'; McCormick 43'	Report	Salido 88'; Ferreras 89'

Cobham Training Centre, Stoke d'Abernon
Attendance: 114
Referee: Jens Maae (Denmark)

=== Group D ===
Pos	Team	Pld	W	D	L	GF	GA	GD	Pts	Qualification	BAR	SPO	OLY	JUV
1	(Spain) Barcelona	6	5	1	0	12	1	+11	16	Round of 16	—	1–1	5–0	1–0
2	(Portugal) Sporting CP	6	2	3	1	10	6	+4	9	Play-offs	0–1	—	1–1	2–0
3	(Greece) Olympiacos	6	1	2	3	6	14	−8	5		0–3	2–2	—	2–0
4	(Italy) Juventus	6	1	0	5	4	11	−7	3		0–1	1–4	3–1	—

Source: UEFA
12 September 2017
16:00

Barcelona (Spain)	1–0	(Italy) Juventus
Pérez 84'	Report

Mini Estadi, Barcelona
Attendance: 702
Referee: Mads-Kristoffer Kristoffersen (Denmark)
12 September 2017
17:00

Olympiacos (Greece)	2–2	(Portugal) Sporting CP
Kostanasios 18'; Lamprou 20'	Report	Luís 47'; Baldé 76'

Renti Training Centre, Piraeus
Attendance: 1,300
Referee: Alan Mario Sant (Malta)

27 September 2017
15:00

Juventus (Italy)	3–1	(Greece) Olympiacos
Olivieri 33'; Kameraj 52'; Di Pardo 68'	Report	Vrousai 23'

Juventus Center, Vinovo
Attendance: 423
Referee: Fedayi San (Switzerland)
27 September 2017
16:00

Sporting CP (Portugal)	0–1	(Spain) Barcelona
	Report	Gómez 61'

CGD Stadium Aurelio Pereira, Alcochete
Attendance: 376
Referee: François Letexier (France)

18 October 2017
16:00

Juventus (Italy)	1–4	(Portugal) Sporting CP
Capellini 74'	Report	Leão 9', 19'; Luís 41' (pen.); Cabral 44'

Juventus Center, Vinovo
Attendance: 445
Referee: Fran Jović (Croatia)
18 October 2017
16:00

Barcelona (Spain)	5–0	(Greece) Olympiacos
Pérez 28', 80'; Monchu 45+1'; Delgado 70'; Puig 88'	Report

Mini Estadi, Barcelona
Attendance: 519
Referee: Rob Harvey (Republic of Ireland)

31 October 2017
15:00

Sporting CP (Portugal)	2–0	(Italy) Juventus
Leão 45'; Brás 90+2'	Report

CGD Stadium Aurelio Pereira, Alcochete
Attendance: 251
Referee: Sandro Schärer (Switzerland)
31 October 2017
17:00

Olympiacos (Greece)	0–3	(Spain) Barcelona
	Report	Collado 44', 56'; Pérez 90+2'

Renti Training Centre, Piraeus
Attendance: 1,500
Referee: Roi Reinshreiber (Israel)

22 November 2017
15:00

Sporting CP (Portugal)	1–1	(Greece) Olympiacos
Ferreira 27'	Report	Voilis 29'

CGD Stadium Aurelio Pereira, Alcochete
Attendance: 200
Referee: Neil Doyle (Republic of Ireland)
22 November 2017
16:00

Juventus (Italy)	0–1	(Spain) Barcelona
	Report	Puig 50'

Juventus Center, Vinovo
Attendance: 490
Referee: Jonathan Lardot (Belgium)

5 December 2017
14:00

Barcelona (Spain)	1–1	(Portugal) Sporting CP
Fernández 56'	Report	Leão 90'

Mini Estadi, Barcelona
Attendance: 375
Referee: Marius Avram (Romania)
5 December 2017
17:00

Olympiacos (Greece)	2–0	(Italy) Juventus
Vrousai 1'; Xenitidis 49'	Report

Renti Training Centre, Piraeus
Attendance: 800
Referee: Ádám Farkas (Hungary)

=== Group E ===
Pos	Team	Pld	W	D	L	GF	GA	GD	Pts	Qualification	LIV	SPM	SEV	MRB
1	(England) Liverpool	6	5	0	1	18	3	+15	15	Round of 16	—	2–0	4–0	3–0
2	(Russia) Spartak Moscow	6	2	2	2	11	8	+3	8 (Note: Head-to-head results: Spartak Moscow 1–1 Sevilla, Sevilla 3–3 Spartak Moscow (Spartak Moscow won on away goals).)	Play-offs	2–1	—	1–1	5–0
3	(Spain) Sevilla	6	2	2	2	6	12	−6	8		0–4	3–3	—	1–0
4	(Slovenia) Maribor	6	1	0	5	2	14	−12	3		1–4	1–0	0–1	—

Source: UEFA
Notes:
13 September 2017
14:00

Maribor (Slovenia)	1–0	(Russia) Spartak Moscow
Horvat 50'	Report

Lendava Sports Park, Lendava
Attendance: 650
Referee: Ferenc Karakó (Hungary)
13 September 2017
18:00

Liverpool (England)	4–0	(Spain) Sevilla
Jones 23', 45+3'; Kane 28'; Masterson 66'	Report

Prenton Park, Birkenhead
Attendance: 161
Referee: Thorvaldur Árnason (Iceland)

26 September 2017
13:00

Spartak Moscow (Russia)	2–1	(England) Liverpool
Rudenko 24', 57'	Report	Lewis 18'

Spartak Academy pitch no. 4, Moscow
Attendance: 2,381
Referee: Donatas Rumšas (Lithuania)
26 September 2017
18:00

Sevilla (Spain)	1–0	(Slovenia) Maribor
Flueraș 30'	Report

Ciudad Deportiva José Ramón Cisneros Palacios, Seville
Attendance: 480
Referee: Jens Maae (Denmark)

17 October 2017
13:00

Spartak Moscow (Russia)	1–1	(Spain) Sevilla
Rudenko 57'	Report	Josema 3'

Spartak Academy pitch no. 4, Moscow
Attendance: 600
Referee: Alper Ulusoy (Turkey)
17 October 2017
13:00

Maribor (Slovenia)	1–4	(England) Liverpool
Matko 23'	Report	Adekanye 30', 58'; Kane 32'; Millar 52'

Lendava Sports Park, Lendava
Attendance: 1,922
Referee: Markus Hameter (Austria)

1 November 2017
13:30

Liverpool (England)	3–0	(Slovenia) Maribor
Jones 4'; Woodburn 11' (pen.); McAuley 86'	Report

Prenton Park, Birkenhead
Attendance: 439
Referee: Andrew Dallas (Scotland)
1 November 2017
14:00

Sevilla (Spain)	3–3	(Russia) Spartak Moscow
Calderón 41'; Viedma 45'; Charaf 52'	Report	Ignatov 17'; Rudenko 54'; Mazurov 90+2'

Ciudad Deportiva José Ramón Cisneros Palacios, Seville
Attendance: 1,287
Referee: Duje Strukan (Croatia)

21 November 2017
12:00

Spartak Moscow (Russia)	5–0	(Slovenia) Maribor
Kalachevsky 32', 39'; Rudenko 47', 76'; Mazurov 72'	Report

Spartak Academy pitch no. 4, Moscow
Attendance: 370
Referee: Aleksandrs Anufrijevs (Latvia)
21 November 2017
16:00

Sevilla (Spain)	0–4	(England) Liverpool
	Report	Millar 1'; Kane 39'; Brewster 51'; Adekanye 90+2'

Ciudad Deportiva José Ramón Cisneros Palacios, Seville
Attendance: 490
Referee: François Letexier (France)

6 December 2017
13:00

Maribor (Slovenia)	0–1	(Spain) Sevilla
	Report	Genaro 90+1'

Lendava Sports Park, Lendava
Attendance: 412
Referee: Peter Kralović (Slovakia)
6 December 2017
13:30

Liverpool (England)	2–0	(Russia) Spartak Moscow
Jones 13'; Johnston 32'	Report

Prenton Park, Birkenhead
Attendance: 409
Referee: Mohammed Al-Hakim (Sweden)

=== Group F ===
Pos	Team	Pld	W	D	L	GF	GA	GD	Pts	Qualification	MCI	FEY	SHK	NAP
1	(England) Manchester City	6	4	1	1	14	7	+7	13	Round of 16	—	0–0	3–1	3–1
2	(Netherlands) Feyenoord	6	2	3	1	11	8	+3	9	Play-offs	0–2	—	4–0	4–3
3	(Ukraine) Shakhtar Donetsk	6	2	1	3	7	12	−5	7		2–1	1–1	—	1–2
4	(Italy) Napoli	6	1	1	4	12	17	−5	4		3–5	2–2	1–2	—

Source: UEFA
13 September 2017
13:00

Shakhtar Donetsk (Ukraine)	1–2	(Italy) Napoli
Kulakov 71'	Report	Gaetano 44'; Zerbin 72'

FC Metalist Training Ground, Vysokyi (Note: Shakhtar Donetsk played their home matches at FC Metalist Training Ground, Vysokyi, Kharkiv Oblast, instead of their regular stadium RSC Olimpiyskiy, Donetsk, due to the war conditions in Eastern Ukraine.)
Referee: Aleksandrs Anufrijevs (Latvia)
13 September 2017
15:00

Feyenoord (Netherlands)	0–2	(England) Manchester City
	Report	Matondo 26'; Francis 70'

Stadion Woudestein, Rotterdam
Referee: Glenn Nyberg (Sweden)

26 September 2017
14:00

Napoli (Italy)	2–2	(Netherlands) Feyenoord
Gaetano 17'; Schiavi 45+1'	Report	Van der Kust 66'; Geertruida 90'

Stadio Pasquale Ianniello, Frattamaggiore
Referee: Anastasios Papapetrou (Greece)
26 September 2017
17:00

Manchester City (England)	3–1	(Ukraine) Shakhtar Donetsk
Latibeaudiere 43'; Foden 49'; Richards 90+4'	Report	Yakimets 53'

Academy Stadium, Manchester
Attendance: 618
Referee: Kai Erik Steen (Norway)

17 October 2017
15:00

Feyenoord (Netherlands)	4–0	(Ukraine) Shakhtar Donetsk
Kökçü 6'; Zwarts 39'; Vente 40', 59'	Report

Stadion Woudestein, Rotterdam
Referee: Tim Marshall (Northern Ireland)
17 October 2017
16:00

Manchester City (England)	3–1	(Italy) Napoli
Díaz 21', 58' (pen.); Garré 65'	Report	Russo 48'

Academy Stadium, Manchester
Attendance: 612
Referee: Bart Vertenten (Belgium)

1 November 2017
13:00

Shakhtar Donetsk (Ukraine)	1–1	(Netherlands) Feyenoord
Kuzmenko 65'	Report	Vente 90'

FC Metalist Training Ground, Vysokyi
Referee: Zbynek Proske (Czech Republic)
1 November 2017
14:00

Napoli (Italy)	3–5	(England) Manchester City
Esposito 55'; Scarf 61'; Zerbin 80'	Report	Richards 7', 26'; Touaizi 22', 42'; Garré 36'

Stadio Pasquale Ianniello, Frattamaggiore
Referee: Christian Dingert (Germany)

21 November 2017
14:00

Napoli (Italy)	1–2	(Ukraine) Shakhtar Donetsk
Zerbin 78'	Report	Kashchuk 40'; Melichenko 71'

Stadio Pasquale Ianniello, Frattamaggiore
Referee: Nikola Dabanović (Montenegro)
21 November 2017
15:45

Manchester City (England)	0–0	(Netherlands) Feyenoord
	Report

Academy Stadium, Manchester
Attendance: 850
Referee: Kevin Clancy (Scotland)

6 December 2017
12:00

Shakhtar Donetsk (Ukraine)	2–1	(England) Manchester City
Kashchuk 20', 67'	Report	Smith 35'

FC Metalist Training Ground, Vysokyi
Referee: Daniyar Sakhi (Kazakhstan)
6 December 2017
16:00

Feyenoord (Netherlands)	4–3	(Italy) Napoli
Kökçü 33', 49'; Geertruida 37'; El Bouchataoui 90+5' (pen.)	Report	Zerbin 10'; Palmieri 69'; Gaetano 85' (pen.)

Stadion Woudestein, Rotterdam
Referee: Bartosz Frankowski (Poland)

=== Group G ===
Pos	Team	Pld	W	D	L	GF	GA	GD	Pts	Qualification	POR	MON	RBL	BES
1	(Portugal) Porto	6	5	0	1	15	7	+8	15	Round of 16	—	2–1	3–2	5–1
2	(France) Monaco	6	3	1	2	15	10	+5	10	Play-offs	3–2	—	2–2	3–0
3	(Germany) RB Leipzig	6	1	2	3	10	12	−2	5		0–2	1–4	—	4–0
4	(Turkey) Beşiktaş	6	1	1	4	5	16	−11	4		0–1	3–2	1–1	—

Source: UEFA
13 September 2017
15:00

RB Leipzig (Germany)	1–4	(France) Monaco
Majetschak 88'	Report	Mboula 2'; Popovic 38'; Senkbeil 72' (o.g.); Sylla 73'

Stadion am Cottaweg, Leipzig
Attendance: 830
Referee: Krzysztof Jakubik (Poland)
13 September 2017
16:00

Porto (Portugal)	5–1	(Turkey) Beşiktaş
Teixeira 31'; Estrela 32'; Queta 65'; Dalot 70' (pen.); Queirós 79'	Report	Queirós 39' (o.g.)

CTFD PortoGaia, Vila Nova de Gaia
Attendance: 407
Referee: Adrien Jaccottet (Switzerland)

26 September 2017
14:00

Beşiktaş (Turkey)	1–1	(Germany) RB Leipzig
Öztürk 15'	Report	Abouchabaka 36' (pen.)

Yusuf Ziya Öniş Stadium, Istanbul
Attendance: 120
Referee: Rahim Hasanov (Azerbaijan)
26 September 2017
15:00

Monaco (France)	3–2	(Portugal) Porto
Mboula 4'; Bongiovanni 78', 86'	Report	Maleck 45+1'; Badiashile 54' (o.g.)

Stade de formation AS Monaco 1, La Turbie
Attendance: 215
Referee: Alain Durieux (Luxembourg)

17 October 2017
15:00

RB Leipzig (Germany)	0–2	(Portugal) Porto
	Report	Dalot 79'; Baró 82'

Stadion am Cottaweg, Leipzig
Attendance: 520
Referee: Ognjen Valjić (Bosnia and Herzegovina)
17 October 2017
16:00

Monaco (France)	3–0	(Turkey) Beşiktaş
Abanda Mfomo 63'; Mboula 68', 77'	Report

Stade de formation AS Monaco 1, La Turbie
Attendance: 183
Referee: Alexandre Boucaut (Belgium)

1 November 2017
12:00

Beşiktaş (Turkey)	3–2	(France) Monaco
Açıkgöz 9'; Akgün 32'; Apardı 42' (pen.)	Report	Bongiovanni 45+2'; Alioui 54'

Yusuf Ziya Öniş Stadium, Istanbul
Attendance: 150
Referee: Nikola Popov (Bulgaria)
1 November 2017
15:00

Porto (Portugal)	3–2	(Germany) RB Leipzig
Estrela 4' (pen.); Maleck 40'; Queta 61'	Report	Hartmann 44'; Kühn 90+3'

CTFD PortoGaia, Vila Nova de Gaia
Attendance: 711
Referee: Robert Madley (England)

21 November 2017
12:00

Beşiktaş (Turkey)	0–1	(Portugal) Porto
	Report	Leite 45+3'

Yusuf Ziya Öniş Stadium, Istanbul
Attendance: 150
Referee: Aliyar Aghayev (Azerbaijan)
21 November 2017
15:00

Monaco (France)	2–2	(Germany) RB Leipzig
Alioui 41', 75'	Report	Krüger 15'; Stierlin 81'

Stade de formation AS Monaco 1, La Turbie
Attendance: 165
Referee: Farrugia Cann Trustin (Malta)

6 December 2017
15:00

RB Leipzig (Germany)	4–0	(Turkey) Beşiktaş
Schimmel 57'; Stierlin 70'; Aslan 81' (pen.); Hartmann 89'	Report

Stadion am Cottaweg, Leipzig
Attendance: 354
Referee: Manfredas Lukjancukas (Lithuania)
6 December 2017
15:00

Porto (Portugal)	2–1	(France) Monaco
Pires 42'; Queta 66'	Report	Alioui 25'

CTFD PortoGaia, Vila Nova de Gaia
Attendance: 306
Referee: José María Sánchez Martínez (Spain)

=== Group H ===
Pos	Team	Pld	W	D	L	GF	GA	GD	Pts	Qualification	TOT	RMA	DOR	APO
1	(England) Tottenham Hotspur	6	4	1	1	15	6	+9	13	Round of 16	—	3–2	4–0	4–1
2	(Spain) Real Madrid	6	3	1	2	21	10	+11	10	Play-offs	1–1	—	2–1	10–0
3	(Germany) Borussia Dortmund	6	3	0	3	14	12	+2	9		1–3	5–3	—	5–0
4	(Cyprus) APOEL	6	1	0	5	2	24	−22	3		1–0	0–3	0–2	—

Source: UEFA
13 September 2017
16:00

Real Madrid (Spain)	10–0	(Cyprus) APOEL
Gómez 18', 25', 43' (pen.); Adri 32'; Baeza 41' (pen.), 83'; Zabarte 49'; Pedro 62', 71', 77'	Report

Estadio Alfredo di Stéfano, Madrid
Attendance: 390
Referee: Laurent Kopriwa (Luxembourg)
13 September 2017
16:00

Tottenham Hotspur (England)	4–0	(Germany) Borussia Dortmund
Edwards 4' (pen.), 61'; Bennetts 30'; Sterling 33'	Report

Tottenham Hotspur Training Centre, London
Attendance: 250
Referee: Bryn Markham-Jones (Wales)

26 September 2017
15:00

APOEL (Cyprus)	1–0	(England) Tottenham Hotspur
Karayiannis 23'	Report

Makario Stadium, Nicosia
Attendance: 400
Referee: Stefan Apostolov (Bulgaria)
26 September 2017
16:00

Borussia Dortmund (Germany)	5–3	(Spain) Real Madrid
Bulut 12', 18'; Bruun Larsen 59', 81' (pen.); Isak 85'	Report	Baeza 27'; Gómez 35'; Martín 87'

Dortmund Brackel Training Ground, Dortmund
Attendance: 520
Referee: Lawrence Visser (Belgium)

17 October 2017
15:00

APOEL (Cyprus)	0–2	(Germany) Borussia Dortmund
	Report	Bruun Larsen 83'; Sancho 90+3'

Makario Stadium, Nicosia
Attendance: 600
Referee: Eitan Shmuelevitz (Israel)
17 October 2017
18:00

Real Madrid (Spain)	1–1	(England) Tottenham Hotspur
Gómez 71'	Report	Roles 29'

Estadio Alfredo di Stéfano, Madrid
Attendance: 345
Referee: João Pinheiro (Portugal)

1 November 2017
16:00

Tottenham Hotspur (England)	3–2	(Spain) Real Madrid
Tanganga 27'; Edwards 47' (pen.); Sterling 82'	Report	César 20'; Martín 61'

Tottenham Hotspur Training Centre, London
Attendance: 203
Referee: Peter Kjærsgaard-Andersen (Denmark)
1 November 2017
18:00

Borussia Dortmund (Germany)	5–0	(Cyprus) APOEL
Bruun Larsen 8'; Kampetsis 26', 36', 69'; Sancho 83'	Report

Dortmund Brackel Training Ground, Dortmund
Attendance: 485
Referee: Antti Munukka (Finland)

21 November 2017
14:00

Borussia Dortmund (Germany)	1–3	(England) Tottenham Hotspur
Aydinel 30'	Report	Shashoua 7'; Brown 18'; Sterling 44'

Dortmund Brackel Training Ground, Dortmund
Attendance: 422
Referee: Sandro Schärer (Switzerland)
21 November 2017
15:00

APOEL (Cyprus)	0–3	(Spain) Real Madrid
	Report	Gómez 10'; Óscar 27', 89'

Makario Stadium, Nicosia
Attendance: 200
Referee: Stavros Mantalos (Greece)

6 December 2017
15:00

Tottenham Hotspur (England)	4–1	(Cyprus) APOEL
Griffiths 12'; Edwards 29'; Tanganga 43'; Richards 80'	Report	Adoni 62'

Tottenham Hotspur Training Centre, London
Attendance: 175
Referee: Erik Lambrechts (Belgium)
6 December 2017
18:00

Real Madrid (Spain)	2–1	(Germany) Borussia Dortmund
Óscar 23'; Gómez 73'	Report	Sancho 16' (pen.)

Estadio Alfredo di Stéfano, Madrid
Attendance: 793
Referee: Georgi Kabakov (Bulgaria)
