= 2017–18 UEFA Youth League knockout phase =

European club football tournament

The 2017–18 UEFA Youth League knockout phase began on 6 February 2018 and concluded on 23 April 2018 with the final at Colovray Stadium in Nyon, Switzerland, to decide the champions of the 2017–18 UEFA Youth League. A total of 24 teams competed in the knockout phase.

Times up to 24 March 2018 (knockout round play-offs, round of 16 and quarter-finals) are CET (UTC+1), thereafter times (semi-finals and final) are CEST (UTC+2).

== Round and draw dates ==
The schedule of the knockout phase (knockout round play-offs and round of 16 onwards) was as follows (all draws were held at the UEFA headquarters in Nyon, Switzerland).

Round	Draw	Match dates
Knockout round play-offs	11 December 2017	6–7 February 2018
Round of 16	9 February 2018	20–21 February 2018
Quarter-finals	9 February 2018	13–14 March 2018
Semi-finals	9 February 2018	20 April 2018 at Colovray Stadium, Nyon
Final	9 February 2018	23 April 2018 at Colovray Stadium, Nyon

== Format ==
The knockout phase (knockout round play-offs and round of 16 onwards), played as a single-elimination tournament, involved 24 teams: 16 teams which qualified from the UEFA Champions League Path (eight group winners and eight group runners-up), and eight teams which qualified from the Domestic Champions Path (eight second round winners):

- The eight group winners from the UEFA Champions League Path entered the round of 16.
- The eight group runners-up from the UEFA Champions League Path and the eight second round winners from the Domestic Champions Path entered the knockout round play-offs. The eight play-off winners advanced to the round of 16.

Each tie was played over a single match. If the score was tied after full time, the match was decided by a penalty shoot-out (no extra time was played).

== Qualified teams ==
=== UEFA Champions League Path ===
Group	Winners (enter round of 16)	Runners-up (enter play-offs as away team)
A	(Switzerland) Basel	(England) Manchester United
B	(Germany) Bayern Munich	(France) Paris Saint-Germain
C	(England) Chelsea	(Spain) Atlético Madrid
D	(Spain) Barcelona	(Portugal) Sporting CP
E	(England) Liverpool	(Russia) Spartak Moscow
F	(England) Manchester City	(Netherlands) Feyenoord
G	(Portugal) Porto	(France) Monaco
H	(England) Tottenham Hotspur	(Spain) Real Madrid

=== Domestic Champions Path ===
Second round winners
(enter play-offs as home team)
(Norway) Molde
(Bosnia and Herzegovina) Željezničar
(Italy) Internazionale
(Netherlands) Ajax
(Serbia) Brodarac
(Slovakia) Nitra
(Russia) Krasnodar
(Austria) Red Bull Salzburg

== Bracket ==
The draw for the round of 16 onwards was held on 9 February 2018, 13:00 CET, at the UEFA headquarters in Nyon, Switzerland. The mechanism of the draws for each round was as follows:

- In the draw for the round of 16, there were no seedings, and the 16 teams (eight UEFA Champions League Path group winners and eight play-off winners) were drawn into eight ties. Teams from the same UEFA Champions League Path group could not be drawn against each other, but teams from the same association could be drawn against each other. The draw also decided the home team for each round of 16 match.
- In the draws for the quarter-finals onwards, there were no seedings, and teams from the same UEFA Champions League Path group or the same association could be drawn against each other (the identity of all teams were not known at the time of the draw). The draws also decided the home team for each quarter-final, and the "home" team for administrative purposes for each semi-final and final (which were played at a neutral venue).

Knockout round play-offs
(Russia) Krasnodar	0 (0)
(Spain) Real Madrid (p)	0 (3)
(Slovakia) Nitra	2
(Netherlands) Feyenoord	3
(Norway) Molde	2 (2)
(France) Monaco (p)	2 (4)
(Austria) Red Bull Salzburg	5
(Portugal) Sporting CP	2
(Italy) Internazionale (p)	3 (3)
(Russia) Spartak Moscow	3 (1)
(Serbia) Brodarac	0
(England) Manchester United	2
(Netherlands) Ajax	0 (2)
(France) Paris Saint-Germain (p)	0 (4)
(Bosnia and Herzegovina) Željezničar	1
(Spain) Atlético Madrid	3

Round of 16
(Germany) Bayern Munich	2
(Spain) Real Madrid	3
(England) Chelsea	5
(Netherlands) Feyenoord	2
(England) Tottenham Hotspur (p)	1 (3)
(France) Monaco	1 (1)
(Portugal) Porto	3
(Austria) Red Bull Salzburg	1
(England) Manchester City (p)	1 (3)
(Italy) Internazionale	1 (2)
(England) Liverpool	2
(England) Manchester United	0
(France) Paris Saint-Germain	0
(Spain) Barcelona	1
(Spain) Atlético Madrid	1
(Switzerland) Basel	0

Quarter-finals
(Spain) Real Madrid	2
(England) Chelsea	4
(England) Tottenham Hotspur	0
(Portugal) Porto	2
(England) Manchester City (p)	1 (3)
(England) Liverpool	1 (2)
(Spain) Barcelona	2
(Spain) Atlético Madrid	0

Semi-finals
20 April – Nyon
(England) Chelsea (p)	2 (5)
(Portugal) Porto	2 (4)
20 April – Nyon
(England) Manchester City	4
(Spain) Barcelona	5

Final
23 April – Nyon
(England) Chelsea	0
(Spain) Barcelona	3

== Knockout round play-offs ==
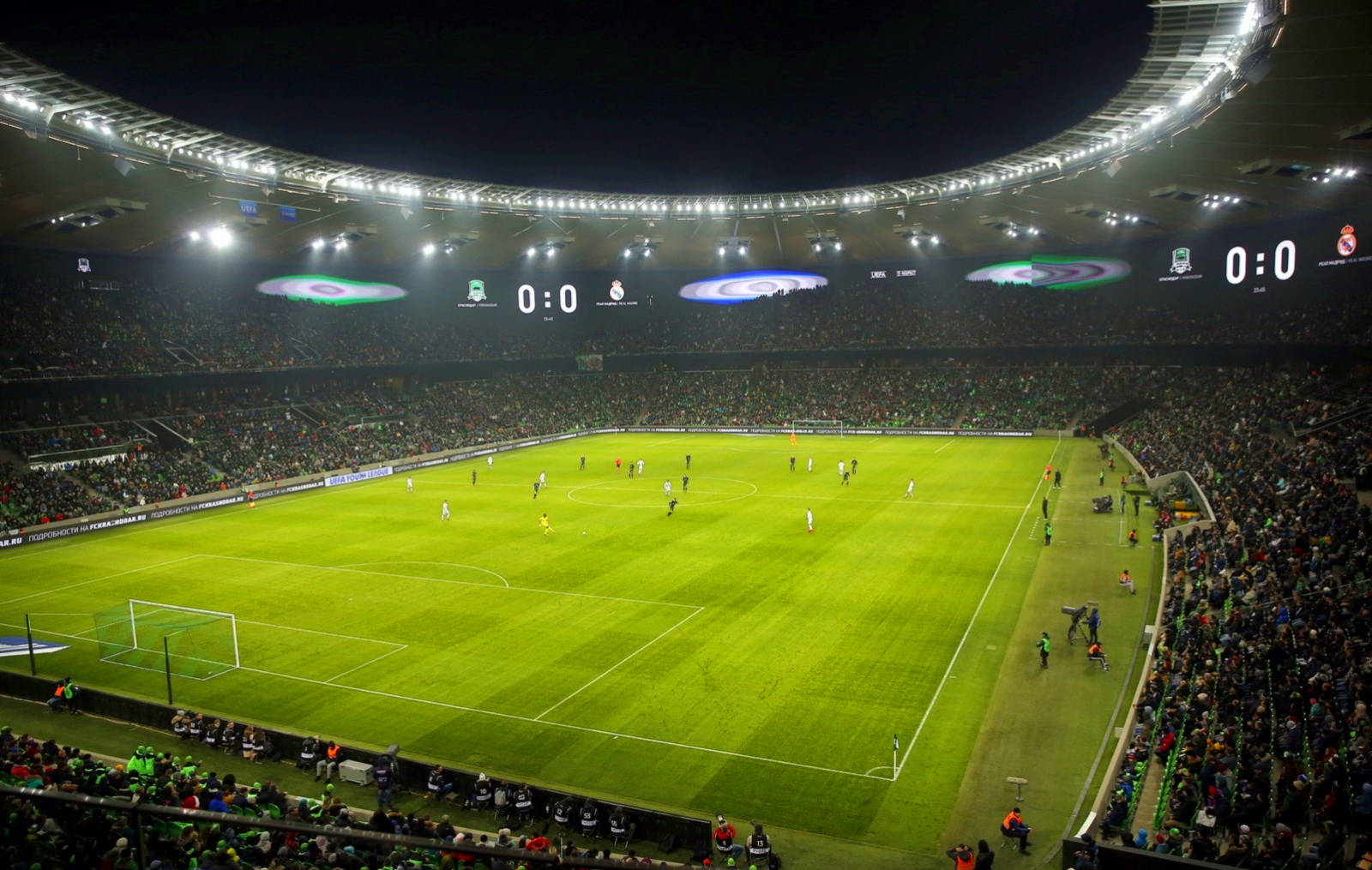
The Krasnodar Stadium during Krasnodar v Real Madrid.

The draw for the knockout round play-offs was held on 11 December 2017, 14:30 CET, at the UEFA headquarters in Nyon, Switzerland. The eight second round winners from the Domestic Champions Path were drawn against the eight group runners-up from the UEFA Champions League Path, with the teams from the Domestic Champions Path hosting the match. Teams from the same association could not be drawn against each other. The eight play-off winners advanced to the round of 16, where they were joined by the eight group winners from the UEFA Champions League Path.

=== Summary ===
The matches were played on 6 and 7 February 2018.

Home team	Score	Away team
Molde (Norway)	2–2 (2–4 p)	(France) Monaco
Internazionale (Italy)	3–3 (3–1 p)	(Russia) Spartak Moscow
Ajax (Netherlands)	0–0 (2–4 p)	(France) Paris Saint-Germain
Red Bull Salzburg (Austria)	5–2	(Portugal) Sporting CP
Brodarac (Serbia)	0–2	(England) Manchester United
Nitra (Slovakia)	2–3	(Netherlands) Feyenoord
Željezničar (Bosnia and Herzegovina)	1–3	(Spain) Atlético Madrid
Krasnodar (Russia)	0–0 (0–3 p)	(Spain) Real Madrid

=== Matches ===
7 February 2018
18:00

Molde (Norway)	2–2	(France) Monaco
Gussiås 45+1'; T. Svendsen 56'	Report	Byttingsvik 12' (o.g.); Zerkane 50'
Penalties
Østigård (penalty scored); Markovic (penalty scored); Dahl (penalty missed); Mordal (penalty missed)	2–4	(penalty scored) Alioui; (penalty scored) Serrano; (penalty scored) Antonucci; (penalty scored) Sylla

Aker Stadion, Molde
Attendance: 615
Referee: Kristo Tohver (Estonia)

6 February 2018
16:00

Internazionale (Italy)	3–3	(Russia) Spartak Moscow
Emmers 12'; Odgaard 83'; Petrunin 86' (o.g.)	Report	Bakayev 29'; Proshlyakov 37'; Rudenko 88' (pen.)
Penalties
Colidio (penalty scored); Pinamonti (penalty scored); Emmers (penalty scored); Rover (penalty missed)	3–1	(penalty scored) Mironov; (penalty missed) Mazurov; (penalty missed) Lopatin; (penalty missed) Petrunin

San Siro, Milan
Attendance: 4,500
Referee: Nicolas Rainville (France)

6 February 2018
18:00

Ajax (Netherlands)	0–0	(France) Paris Saint-Germain
	Report
Penalties
Sierhuis (penalty scored); De Wit (penalty missed); Jensen (penalty missed); Danilo (penalty scored)	2–4	(penalty scored) N'Soki; (penalty scored) Güçlü; (penalty scored) Toufiqui; (penalty scored) Dina Ebimbe

Sportpark De Toekomst, Ouder-Amstel
Attendance: 1,850
Referee: Craig Pawson (England)

7 February 2018
18:00

Red Bull Salzburg (Austria)	5–2	(Portugal) Sporting CP
L. Meisl 14'; Sturm 24'; Gölles 57'; Gorzel 63'; Szoboszlai 89'	Report	Leão 18'; Baldé 71'

Red Bull Arena, Wals-Siezenheim
Attendance: 1,329
Referee: Bojan Pandžić (Sweden)

7 February 2018
18:30

Brodarac (Serbia)	0–2	(England) Manchester United
	Report	Boonen 19'; Ivančević 29' (o.g.)

Voždovac Stadium, Belgrade
Attendance: 3,000
Referee: Alexander Harkam (Austria)

6 February 2018
16:00

Nitra (Slovakia)	2–3	(Netherlands) Feyenoord
Fábry 32', 43'	Report	Kökçü 20', 71'; Burger 90'

Štadión FC ViOn, Zlaté Moravce
Attendance: 2,020
Referee: Petr Ardeleánu (Czech Republic)

7 February 2018
16:00

Željezničar (Bosnia and Herzegovina)	1–3	(Spain) Atlético Madrid
Šehić 9'	Report	Garcés 27', 32'; Agüero 68'

Stadion Grbavica, Sarajevo
Attendance: 7,500
Referee: Mete Kalkavan (Turkey)

7 February 2018
17:00

Krasnodar (Russia)	0–0	(Spain) Real Madrid
	Report
Penalties
Ignatyev (penalty missed); Suleymanov (penalty missed); Grigoryan (penalty missed)	0–3	(penalty scored) Martín; (penalty scored) Baeza; (penalty scored) Gómez

Krasnodar Stadium, Krasnodar
Attendance: 32,510
Referee: Thorvaldur Árnason (Iceland)

== Round of 16 ==
=== Summary ===
The round of 16 matches were played on 20 and 21 February 2018.

Home team	Score	Away team
Bayern Munich (Germany)	2–3	(Spain) Real Madrid
Manchester City (England)	1–1 (3–2 p)	(Italy) Internazionale
Atlético Madrid (Spain)	1–0	(Switzerland) Basel
Porto (Portugal)	3–1	(Austria) Red Bull Salzburg
Paris Saint-Germain (France)	0–1	(Spain) Barcelona
Liverpool (England)	2–0	(England) Manchester United
Tottenham Hotspur (England)	1–1 (3–1 p)	(France) Monaco
Chelsea (England)	5–2	(Netherlands) Feyenoord

=== Matches ===
21 February 2018
18:00

Bayern Munich (Germany)	2–3	(Spain) Real Madrid
Köhn 21'; Fein 54'	Report	Baeza 6'; López 38'; Alberto 74'

FC Bayern Campus, Munich
Attendance: 0
Referee: Benoît Millot (France)

20 February 2018
18:00

Manchester City (England)	1–1	(Italy) Internazionale
L. Nmecha 27' (pen.)	Report	Emmers 12'
Penalties
F. Nmecha (penalty scored); Francis (penalty scored); Smith (penalty missed); Foden (penalty missed); L. Nmecha (penalty missed); Díaz (penalty missed); Touaizi (penalty scored)	3–2	(penalty missed) Colidio; (penalty scored) Pinamonti; (penalty scored) Emmers; (penalty missed) Rover; (penalty missed) Zaniolo; (penalty missed) Lombardoni; (penalty missed) Bettella

Academy Stadium, Manchester
Attendance: 466
Referee: Mads-Kristoffer Kristoffersen (Denmark)

21 February 2018
16:00

Atlético Madrid (Spain)	1–0	(Switzerland) Basel
Salido 83'	Report

Estadio Cerro del Espino, Majadahonda
Attendance: 431
Referee: Andrew Dallas (Scotland)

21 February 2018
14:00

Porto (Portugal)	3–1	(Austria) Red Bull Salzburg
Bessa 22'; Leite 75'; Fidelis 89'	Report	Koïta 68'

CTFD PortoGaia, Vila Nova de Gaia
Attendance: 305
Referee: Sandro Schärer (Switzerland)

20 February 2018
16:00

Paris Saint-Germain (France)	0–1	(Spain) Barcelona
	Report	Pérez 64'

Stade Municipal Georges Lefèvre, Saint-Germain-en-Laye
Attendance: 998
Referee: Daniel Siebert (Germany)

21 February 2018
16:00

Liverpool (England)	2–0	(England) Manchester United
Woodburn 11'; Camacho 78'	Report

Prenton Park, Birkenhead
Attendance: 830
Referee: Tiago Martins (Portugal)

21 February 2018
13:45

Tottenham Hotspur (England)	1–1	(France) Monaco
Bennetts 50'	Report	Alioui 45'
Penalties
Shashoua (penalty missed); Sterling (penalty scored); Maghoma (penalty scored); Skipp (penalty scored)	3–1	(penalty scored) Alioui; (penalty missed) Bongiovanni; (penalty missed) Antonucci; (penalty missed) Sylla

Broadhall Way, Stevenage
Attendance: 272
Referee: Ville Nevalainen (Finland)

21 February 2018
20:00

Chelsea (England)	5–2	(Netherlands) Feyenoord
Ampadu 6'; Redan 10'; Reith 27' (o.g.); Geertruida 55' (o.g.); St Clair 77'	Report	El Bouchataoui 15'; Lewis 82'

Recreation Ground, Aldershot
Attendance: 491
Referee: Roi Reinshreiber (Israel)

== Quarter-finals ==
=== Summary ===
The quarter-finals were played on 13 and 14 March 2018.

Home team	Score	Away team
Real Madrid (Spain)	2–4	(England) Chelsea
Manchester City (England)	1–1 (3–2 p)	(England) Liverpool
Barcelona (Spain)	2–0	(Spain) Atlético Madrid
Tottenham Hotspur (England)	0–2	(Portugal) Porto

=== Matches ===
14 March 2018
16:00

Real Madrid (Spain)	2–4	(England) Chelsea
Óscar 6'; Isma 59'	Report	McCormick 14'; Redan 19', 45+2'; St Clair 90+5'

Estadio Alfredo di Stéfano, Madrid
Attendance: 1,000
Referee: Daniel Siebert (Germany)

14 March 2018
14:00

Manchester City (England)	1–1	(England) Liverpool
L. Nmecha 40'	Report	Jones 34'
Penalties
F. Nmecha (penalty scored); Francis (penalty missed); Doyle (penalty scored); L. Nmecha (penalty scored)	3–2	(penalty scored) Lewis; (penalty scored) Adekanye; (penalty missed) Jones; (penalty missed) Masterson; (penalty missed) Kane

Academy Stadium, Manchester
Attendance: 784
Referee: Davide Massa (Italy)

13 March 2018
18:00

Barcelona (Spain)	2–0	(Spain) Atlético Madrid
Marqués 25'; Collado 42'	Report

Mini Estadi, Barcelona
Attendance: 1,758
Referee: Bobby Madley (England)

13 March 2018
16:00

Tottenham Hotspur (England)	0–2	(Portugal) Porto
	Report	Skipp 30' (o.g.); Irala 40'

Tottenham Hotspur Training Centre, London
Attendance: 173
Referee: Georgi Kabakov (Bulgaria)

== Semi-finals ==
=== Summary ===
The semi-finals were played on 20 April 2018 at Colovray Stadium, Nyon.

Team 1	Score	Team 2
Manchester City (England)	4–5	(Spain) Barcelona
Chelsea (England)	2–2 (5–4 p)	(Portugal) Porto

=== Matches ===
20 April 2018
17:00

Manchester City (England)	4–5	(Spain) Barcelona
Latibeaudiere 19'; L. Nmecha 24', 85'; Matondo 70'	Report	Pérez 10', 42'; Collado 23'; Puig 31'; Marqués 44'

Colovray Stadium, Nyon
Attendance: 4,000
Referee: Aliyar Aghayev (Azerbaijan)

20 April 2018
13:00

Chelsea (England)	2–2	(Portugal) Porto
Redan 29'; Grant 86'	Report	Queirós 40'; Mário 80'
Penalties
St Clair (penalty scored); Brown (penalty missed); McCormick (penalty scored); Hudson-Odoi (penalty scored); James (penalty missed); Chalobah (penalty scored); Familio-Castillo (penalty scored)	5–4	(penalty scored) Estrela; (penalty missed) Leite; (penalty scored) Lamba; (penalty scored) Maleck; (penalty missed) Pires; (penalty scored) Queirós; (penalty missed) Bessa

Colovray Stadium, Nyon
Attendance: 4,000
Referee: Srđan Jovanović (Serbia)

== Final ==
The final was played on 23 April 2018 at Colovray Stadium, Nyon.

23 April 2018
17:00

Chelsea (England)	0–3	(Spain) Barcelona
	Report	Marqués 33', 52'; Ruiz 90+2'

Colovray Stadium, Nyon
Attendance: 7,200
Referee: Andreas Ekberg (Sweden)
