= 2017–18 UEFA Youth League =

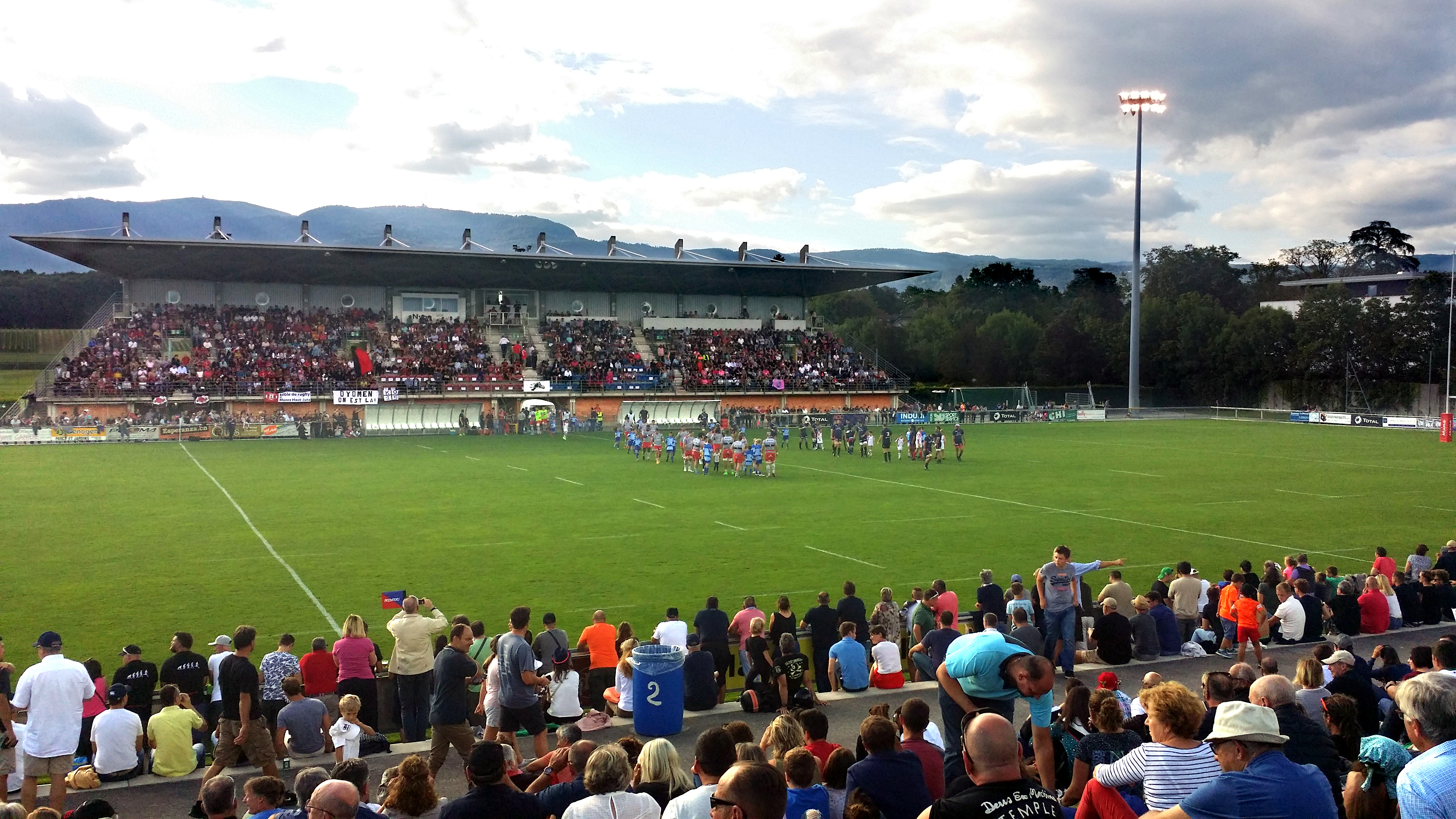
- The Colovray Stadium in Nyon hosted the semi-finals and final.

Tournament details
- Dates: 12 September 2017 – 23 April 2018
- Teams: 64 (from 43 associations)

Final positions
- Champions: (Spain) Barcelona (2nd title)
- Runners-up: (England) Chelsea

Tournament statistics
- Matches played: 167
- Goals scored: 566 (3.39 per match)
- Top scorer(s): (Russia) Ivan Ignatyev (Krasnodar); 10 goals

The 2017–18 UEFA Youth League was the fifth season of the UEFA Youth League, a European youth club football competition organised by UEFA.

Barcelona won their second Youth League title following a win over Chelsea in the final.

Red Bull Salzburg were the defending champions, but were eliminated in the round of 16. Starting from this season, the UEFA Youth League title holders were given an automatic berth in the Domestic Champions path if there was a vacancy.

== Teams ==
A total of 64 teams from 43 of the 55 UEFA member associations entered the tournament, with Albania, Latvia and Luxembourg entering for the first time. They were split into two sections:

- The youth teams of the 32 clubs which qualified for the 2017–18 UEFA Champions League group stage entered the UEFA Champions League Path. If there was a vacancy (youth teams not entering), it was filled by a team defined by UEFA.
- The youth domestic champions of the top 32 associations according to their 2016 UEFA country coefficients entered the Domestic Champions Path. If there was a vacancy (associations with no youth domestic competition, as well as youth domestic champions already included in the UEFA Champions League path), it was first filled by the title holders should they have not yet qualified, and then by the youth domestic champions of the next association in the UEFA ranking.

Rank	Association	Teams	
Rank	Association	UEFA Champions League Path	Domestic Champions Path
1	Spain	Real Madrid (2016–17 División de Honor Juvenil U18); Barcelona; Atlético Madrid; Sevilla	
2	Germany	Bayern Munich; RB Leipzig; Borussia Dortmund (2016–17 U19 Bundesliga)	
3	England	Chelsea (2016–17 Professional U18 Development League 1); Tottenham Hotspur; Manchester City; Manchester United; Liverpool	
4	Italy	Juventus; Roma; Napoli	Internazionale (2016–17 Campionato Primavera U19)
5	Portugal	Benfica; Porto; Sporting CP (2016–17 Campeonato Nacional Juniores S19)	
6	France	Monaco; Paris Saint-Germain	Bordeaux (2016–17 Championnat National U19)
7	Russia	Spartak Moscow; CSKA Moscow	Krasnodar (2016 U17 RFS Cup)
8	Ukraine	Shakhtar Donetsk	Dynamo Kyiv (2016–17 Ukrainian U19 League)
9	Belgium	Anderlecht (2016–17 Belgian U17 League)	
10	Netherlands	Feyenoord	Ajax (2016–17 U19 Eredivisie)
11	Turkey	Beşiktaş	Bursaspor (2016–17 U19 Elit Ligi)
12	Switzerland	Basel (2016–17 Swiss U18 League)	
13	Czech Republic		Sparta Prague (2016–17 Czech U19 League)
14	Greece	Olympiacos (2016–17 Superleague K17)	
15	Romania		Dinamo București (2016–17 Liga Elitelor U19)
16	Austria		Red Bull Salzburg (2016–17 U18 Jugendliga)
17	Croatia		Lokomotiva Zagreb (2016–17 1. HNL Juniori U19)
18	Poland		Legia Warsaw (2016–17 Central Junior League U19)
19	Cyprus	APOEL (2016–17 Cypriot U18 League)	
20	Belarus		Shakhtyor Soligorsk (2016–17 Belarusian U19 League)
21	Sweden		Hammarby IF (2016 Swedish U17 League)
22	Norway		Molde (2016 Norwegian U19 Cup)
23	Israel		Maccabi Haifa (2016–17 Israeli U19 Premier League)
24	Denmark		Esbjerg (2016–17 U19 Ligaen)
25	Scotland	Celtic (2016–17 Scottish U17 League)	
26	Azerbaijan	Qarabağ (2016–17 Azerbaijani U19 League)	
27	Serbia		Brodarac (2016–17 Serbian U19 League)
28	Kazakhstan		Kairat (2016 Kazakhstani U18 League)
29	Bulgaria		Ludogorets Razgrad (2016–17 U18 BFU Cup)
30	Slovenia	Maribor (2016–17 Slovenian U17 League)	
31	Slovakia		Nitra (2016–17 Slovak U19 League)
33	Hungary		Honvéd (2016–17 Hungarian U19 League)
34	Moldova		Zimbru Chișinău (2016–17 Divizia Națională U19)
35	Iceland		Breiðablik (2016 Icelandic U19 League)
36	Georgia		Saburtalo Tbilisi (2016 Georgian U19 League)
37	Finland		KäPa (2016 U17 B-Junior League)
38	Bosnia and Herzegovina		Željezničar (2016–17 Bosnia and Herzegovina U19 Junior League)
39	Albania		Vllaznia (2016–17 Albanian U19 League)
40	Macedonia		Shkëndija (2016–17 Macedonian U19 League)
41	Republic of Ireland		UCD (2016 League of Ireland U19 Division)
42	Latvia		Liepāja (2016 Latvian U18 League)
43	Luxembourg		F91 Dudelange (2016–17 Luxembourg U19 Junior Championship)
44	Montenegro		Sutjeska (2016–17 Montenegrin U19 League)
Associations which did not enter a team (no teams can qualify for UEFA Champions League group stage, and association either not ranked high enough or no youth domestic competition)
32	Liechtenstein		No youth domestic competition
45	Lithuania		
46	Northern Ireland		
47	Estonia		
48	Armenia		
49	Faroe Islands		
50	Malta		
51	Wales		
52	Gibraltar		
53	Andorra		
54	San Marino		
55	Kosovo		

Notes

1. ^{TH} Youth League title holders.
2. ^{†} Teams which were also youth domestic champions, with their vacancies in the Domestic Champions Path filled by the youth domestic champions of the next association in the UEFA ranking.

== Squads ==
Players had to be born on or after 1 January 1999, with a maximum of three players per team born between 1 January 1998 and 31 December 1998 allowed.

== Round and draw dates ==
The schedule of the competition was as follows (all draws were held at the UEFA headquarters in Nyon, Switzerland, unless stated otherwise).

Phase	Round	Draw date	First leg	Second leg
UEFA Champions League Path; Group stage	Matchday 1	24 August 2017 (Monaco)	12–13 September 2017	
UEFA Champions League Path; Group stage	Matchday 2	24 August 2017 (Monaco)	26–27 September 2017	
UEFA Champions League Path; Group stage	Matchday 3	24 August 2017 (Monaco)	17–18 October 2017	
UEFA Champions League Path; Group stage	Matchday 4	24 August 2017 (Monaco)	31 October – 1 November 2017	
UEFA Champions League Path; Group stage	Matchday 5	24 August 2017 (Monaco)	21–22 November 2017	
UEFA Champions League Path; Group stage	Matchday 6	24 August 2017 (Monaco)	5–6 December 2017	
Domestic Champions Path	First round	29 August 2017	27 September 2017	18 October 2017
Domestic Champions Path	Second round	29 August 2017	1 November 2017	22 November 2017
Knockout phase	Knockout round play-offs	11 December 2017	6–7 February 2018	
Knockout phase	Round of 16	9 February 2018	20–21 February 2018	
Knockout phase	Quarter-finals	9 February 2018	13–14 March 2018	
Knockout phase	Semi-finals	9 February 2018	20 April 2018 at Colovray Stadium, Nyon	
Knockout phase	Final	9 February 2018	23 April 2018 at Colovray Stadium, Nyon	

Notes

- For the UEFA Champions League Path group stage, in principle the teams played their matches on Tuesdays and Wednesdays of the matchdays as scheduled for UEFA Champions League, and on the same day as the corresponding senior teams; however, matches could also be played on other dates, including Mondays and Thursdays.
- For the Domestic Champions Path first and second rounds, in principle matches were played on Wednesdays (first round on matchdays 2 and 3, second round on matchdays 4 and 5, as scheduled for UEFA Champions League); however, matches could also be played on other dates, including Mondays, Tuesdays and Thursdays.
- For the play-offs, round of 16 and quarter-finals, in principle matches were played on Tuesdays and Wednesdays of the matchdays as scheduled; however, matches could also be played on other dates, provided they were completed before the following dates:
  - Play-offs: 8 February 2018
  - Round of 16: 28 February 2018
  - Quarter-finals: 16 March 2018

== UEFA Champions League Path ==
For the UEFA Champions League Path, the 32 teams were drawn into eight groups of four. There was no separate draw held, with the group compositions identical to the draw for the 2017–18 UEFA Champions League group stage, which was held on 24 August 2017, 18:00 CEST, at the Grimaldi Forum in Monaco.

In each group, teams played against each other home-and-away in a round-robin format. The eight group winners advanced to the round of 16, while the eight runners-up advanced to the play-offs, where they were joined by the eight second round winners from the Domestic Champions Path.

The matchdays were 12–13 September, 26–27 September, 17–18 October, 31 October – 1 November, 21–22 November, and 5–6 December 2017.

Tiebreakers
Teams were ranked according to points (3 points for a win, 1 point for a draw, 0 points for a loss), and if tied on points, the following tiebreaking criteria were applied, in the order given, to determine the rankings (Regulations Articles 14.03):
1. Points in head-to-head matches among tied teams;
2. Goal difference in head-to-head matches among tied teams;
3. Goals scored in head-to-head matches among tied teams;
4. Away goals scored in head-to-head matches among tied teams;
5. If more than two teams are tied, and after applying all head-to-head criteria above, a subset of teams are still tied, all head-to-head criteria above are reapplied exclusively to this subset of teams;
6. Goal difference in all group matches;
7. Goals scored in all group matches;
8. Away goals scored in all group matches;
9. Wins in all group matches;
10. Away wins in all group matches;
11. Disciplinary points (red card = 3 points, yellow card = 1 point, expulsion for two yellow cards in one match = 3 points);
12. Drawing of lots.

=== Group A ===
Pos	Team	Pld	W	D	L	GF	GA	GD	Pts	Qualification	BSL	MUN	BEN	CSKA
1	(Switzerland) Basel	6	3	2	1	14	11	+3	11 (Note: Head-to-head results: Manchester United 4–3 Basel, Basel 2–1 Manchester United (Basel won on away goals).)	Round of 16	—	2–1	2–2	4–2
2	(England) Manchester United	6	3	2	1	11	9	+2	11	Play-offs	4–3	—	1–1	1–0
3	(Portugal) Benfica	6	1	4	1	10	8	+2	7		0–0	2–2	—	5–1
4	(Russia) CSKA Moscow	6	1	0	5	8	15	−7	3		2–3	1–2	2–0	—

Source: UEFA

=== Group B ===
Pos	Team	Pld	W	D	L	GF	GA	GD	Pts	Qualification	BAY	PAR	CEL	AND
1	(Germany) Bayern Munich	6	4	2	0	14	6	+8	14	Round of 16	—	3–1	6–2	1–0
2	(France) Paris Saint-Germain	6	3	1	2	11	9	+2	10	Play-offs	1–1	—	2–0	2–3
3	(Scotland) Celtic	6	2	0	4	10	15	−5	6		1–2	2–3	—	3–1
4	(Belgium) Anderlecht	6	1	1	4	6	11	−5	4		1–1	0–2	1–2	—

Source: UEFA

=== Group C ===
Pos	Team	Pld	W	D	L	GF	GA	GD	Pts	Qualification	CHE	ATM	ROM	QRB
1	(England) Chelsea	6	5	0	1	17	7	+10	15	Round of 16	—	4–2	0–2	5–0
2	(Spain) Atlético Madrid	6	3	0	3	12	11	+1	9 (Note: Head-to-head results: Roma 1–2 Atlético Madrid, Atlético Madrid 2–1 Roma.)	Play-offs	1–3	—	2–1	0–1
3	(Italy) Roma	6	3	0	3	11	6	+5	9		1–2	1–2	—	3–0
4	(Azerbaijan) Qarabağ	6	1	0	5	3	19	−16	3		1–3	1–5	0–3	—

Source: UEFA

=== Group D ===
Pos	Team	Pld	W	D	L	GF	GA	GD	Pts	Qualification	BAR	SPO	OLY	JUV
1	(Spain) Barcelona	6	5	1	0	12	1	+11	16	Round of 16	—	1–1	5–0	1–0
2	(Portugal) Sporting CP	6	2	3	1	10	6	+4	9	Play-offs	0–1	—	1–1	2–0
3	(Greece) Olympiacos	6	1	2	3	6	14	−8	5		0–3	2–2	—	2–0
4	(Italy) Juventus	6	1	0	5	4	11	−7	3		0–1	1–4	3–1	—

Source: UEFA

=== Group E ===
Pos	Team	Pld	W	D	L	GF	GA	GD	Pts	Qualification	LIV	SPM	SEV	MRB
1	(England) Liverpool	6	5	0	1	18	3	+15	15	Round of 16	—	2–0	4–0	3–0
2	(Russia) Spartak Moscow	6	2	2	2	11	8	+3	8 (Note: Head-to-head results: Spartak Moscow 1–1 Sevilla, Sevilla 3–3 Spartak Moscow (Spartak Moscow won on away goals).)	Play-offs	2–1	—	1–1	5–0
3	(Spain) Sevilla	6	2	2	2	6	12	−6	8		0–4	3–3	—	1–0
4	(Slovenia) Maribor	6	1	0	5	2	14	−12	3		1–4	1–0	0–1	—

Source: UEFA

=== Group F ===
Pos	Team	Pld	W	D	L	GF	GA	GD	Pts	Qualification	MCI	FEY	SHK	NAP
1	(England) Manchester City	6	4	1	1	14	7	+7	13	Round of 16	—	0–0	3–1	3–1
2	(Netherlands) Feyenoord	6	2	3	1	11	8	+3	9	Play-offs	0–2	—	4–0	4–3
3	(Ukraine) Shakhtar Donetsk	6	2	1	3	7	12	−5	7		2–1	1–1	—	1–2
4	(Italy) Napoli	6	1	1	4	12	17	−5	4		3–5	2–2	1–2	—

Source: UEFA

=== Group G ===
Pos	Team	Pld	W	D	L	GF	GA	GD	Pts	Qualification	POR	MON	RBL	BES
1	(Portugal) Porto	6	5	0	1	15	7	+8	15	Round of 16	—	2–1	3–2	5–1
2	(France) Monaco	6	3	1	2	15	10	+5	10	Play-offs	3–2	—	2–2	3–0
3	(Germany) RB Leipzig	6	1	2	3	10	12	−2	5		0–2	1–4	—	4–0
4	(Turkey) Beşiktaş	6	1	1	4	5	16	−11	4		0–1	3–2	1–1	—

Source: UEFA

=== Group H ===
Pos	Team	Pld	W	D	L	GF	GA	GD	Pts	Qualification	TOT	RMA	DOR	APO
1	(England) Tottenham Hotspur	6	4	1	1	15	6	+9	13	Round of 16	—	3–2	4–0	4–1
2	(Spain) Real Madrid	6	3	1	2	21	10	+11	10	Play-offs	1–1	—	2–1	10–0
3	(Germany) Borussia Dortmund	6	3	0	3	14	12	+2	9		1–3	5–3	—	5–0
4	(Cyprus) APOEL	6	1	0	5	2	24	−22	3		1–0	0–3	0–2	—

Source: UEFA

== Domestic Champions Path ==
For the Domestic Champions Path, the 32 teams were drawn into two rounds of two-legged home-and-away ties. The draw was held on 29 August 2017, 14:00 CEST, at the UEFA headquarters in Nyon, Switzerland. There were no seedings, but the 32 teams were split into groups defined by sporting and geographical criteria prior to the draw. In both rounds, if the aggregate score was tied after full-time of the second leg, the away goals rule was used to decide the winner. If still tied, the match was decided by a penalty shoot-out (no extra time was played). The eight second round winners advanced to the play-offs, where they were joined by the eight group runners-up from the UEFA Champions League Path.

=== First round ===
The first legs were played on 26 and 27 September, and the second legs were played on 17 and 18 October 2017.

Team 1	Agg.	Team 2	1st leg	2nd leg
Internazionale (Italy)	5–2	(Ukraine) Dynamo Kyiv	2–2	3–0
Zimbru Chișinău (Moldova)	7–3	(Albania) Vllaznia	3–1	4–2
Ludogorets Razgrad (Bulgaria)	3–4	(Bosnia and Herzegovina) Željezničar	1–1	2–3
Dinamo București (Romania)	2–4	(Croatia) Lokomotiva Zagreb	0–2	2–2
KäPa (Finland)	2–4 (Note: Order of legs reversed after original draw.)	(Denmark) Esbjerg	1–2	1–2
Breiðablik (Iceland)	1–3	(Poland) Legia Warsaw	1–3	0–0
UCD (Republic of Ireland)	3–3 (4–5 p)	(Norway) Molde	2–1	1–2
Hammarby IF (Sweden)	0–6	(Netherlands) Ajax	0–4	0–2
Bordeaux (France)	0–5	(Austria) Red Bull Salzburg	0–1	0–4
Nitra (Slovakia)	2–1	(North Macedonia) Shkëndija	1–0	1–1
F91 Dudelange (Luxembourg)	1–7	(Czech Republic) Sparta Prague	0–4	1–3
Sutjeska (Montenegro)	2–3	(Hungary) Honvéd	2–2	0–1
Brodarac (Serbia)	2–1	(Israel) Maccabi Haifa	1–1	1–0
Kairat (Kazakhstan)	2–11	(Russia) Krasnodar	2–2	0–9
Liepāja (Latvia)	2–4	(Belarus) Shakhtyor Soligorsk	2–1	0–3
Bursaspor (Turkey)	1–2	(Georgia (country)) Saburtalo Tbilisi	0–1	1–1

=== Second round ===
The first legs were played on 29, 31 October and 1 November, and the second legs were played on 21 and 22 November 2017.

Team 1	Agg.	Team 2	1st leg	2nd leg
Zimbru Chișinău (Moldova)	0–2	(Norway) Molde	0–0	0–2
Lokomotiva Zagreb (Croatia)	1–1 (a)	(Bosnia and Herzegovina) Željezničar	1–1	0–0
Internazionale (Italy)	10–1	(Denmark) Esbjerg	4–1	6–0
Legia Warsaw (Poland)	3–4	(Netherlands) Ajax	1–4	2–0
Brodarac (Serbia)	3–3 (a)	(Georgia (country)) Saburtalo Tbilisi	1–1	2–2
Shakhtyor Soligorsk (Belarus)	2–3	(Slovakia) Nitra	2–0	0–3
Krasnodar (Russia)	9–1	(Hungary) Honvéd	8–0	1–1
Sparta Prague (Czech Republic)	2–6	(Austria) Red Bull Salzburg	2–4	0–2

== Knockout phase ==
The draw for the round of 16 onwards was held on 9 February 2018, 13:00 CET, at the UEFA headquarters in Nyon, Switzerland. The mechanism of the draws for each round was as follows:

- In the draw for the round of 16, there were no seedings, and the 16 teams (eight UEFA Champions League Path group winners and eight play-off winners) were drawn into eight ties. Teams from the same UEFA Champions League Path group could not be drawn against each other, but teams from the same association could be drawn against each other. The draw also decided the home team for each round of 16 match.
- In the draws for the quarter-finals onwards, there were no seedings, and teams from the same UEFA Champions League Path group or the same association could be drawn against each other (the identity of all teams were not known at the time of the draw). The draws also decided the home team for each quarter-final, and the "home" team for administrative purposes for each semi-final and final (which were played at a neutral venue).

Each tie was played over a single match. If the score was tied after full time, the match was decided by a penalty shoot-out (no extra time was played).

=== Bracket ===
Knockout round play-offs
(Russia) Krasnodar	0 (0)
(Spain) Real Madrid (p)	0 (3)
(Slovakia) Nitra	2
(Netherlands) Feyenoord	3
(Norway) Molde	2 (2)
(France) Monaco (p)	2 (4)
(Austria) Red Bull Salzburg	5
(Portugal) Sporting CP	2
(Italy) Internazionale (p)	3 (3)
(Russia) Spartak Moscow	3 (1)
(Serbia) Brodarac	0
(England) Manchester United	2
(Netherlands) Ajax	0 (2)
(France) Paris Saint-Germain (p)	0 (4)
(Bosnia and Herzegovina) Željezničar	1
(Spain) Atlético Madrid	3

Round of 16
(Germany) Bayern Munich	2
(Spain) Real Madrid	3
(England) Chelsea	5
(Netherlands) Feyenoord	2
(England) Tottenham Hotspur (p)	1 (3)
(France) Monaco	1 (1)
(Portugal) Porto	3
(Austria) Red Bull Salzburg	1
(England) Manchester City (p)	1 (3)
(Italy) Internazionale	1 (2)
(England) Liverpool	2
(England) Manchester United	0
(France) Paris Saint-Germain	0
(Spain) Barcelona	1
(Spain) Atlético Madrid	1
(Switzerland) Basel	0

Quarter-finals
(Spain) Real Madrid	2
(England) Chelsea	4
(England) Tottenham Hotspur	0
(Portugal) Porto	2
(England) Manchester City (p)	1 (3)
(England) Liverpool	1 (2)
(Spain) Barcelona	2
(Spain) Atlético Madrid	0

Semi-finals
20 April – Nyon
(England) Chelsea (p)	2 (5)
(Portugal) Porto	2 (4)
20 April – Nyon
(England) Manchester City	4
(Spain) Barcelona	5

Final
23 April – Nyon
(England) Chelsea	0
(Spain) Barcelona	3

=== Knockout round play-offs ===
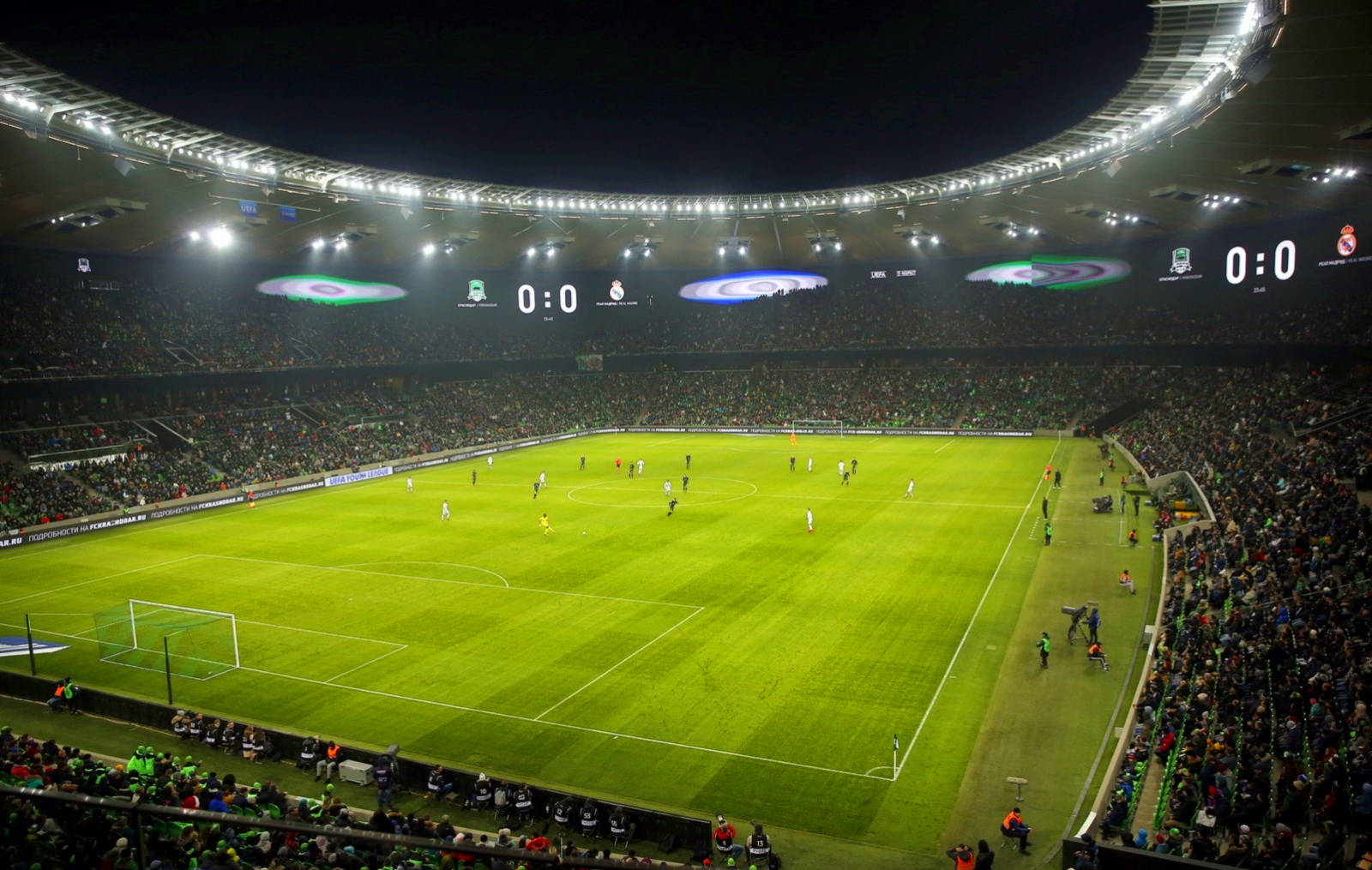
The Krasnodar Stadium during Krasnodar v Real Madrid.

The draw for the knockout round play-offs was held on 11 December 2017, 14:30 CET, at the UEFA headquarters in Nyon, Switzerland. The eight second round winners from the Domestic Champions Path were drawn against the eight group runners-up from the UEFA Champions League Path, with the teams from the Domestic Champions Path hosting the match. Teams from the same association could not be drawn against each other. The eight play-off winners advanced to the round of 16, where they were joined by the eight group winners from the UEFA Champions League Path. Each tie was played over a single match. If the score was tied after full time, the match was decided by a penalty shoot-out (no extra time was played). The matches were played on 6 and 7 February 2018.

Home team	Score	Away team
Molde (Norway)	2–2 (2–4 p)	(France) Monaco
Internazionale (Italy)	3–3 (3–1 p)	(Russia) Spartak Moscow
Ajax (Netherlands)	0–0 (2–4 p)	(France) Paris Saint-Germain
Red Bull Salzburg (Austria)	5–2	(Portugal) Sporting CP
Brodarac (Serbia)	0–2	(England) Manchester United
Nitra (Slovakia)	2–3	(Netherlands) Feyenoord
Željezničar (Bosnia and Herzegovina)	1–3	(Spain) Atlético Madrid
Krasnodar (Russia)	0–0 (0–3 p)	(Spain) Real Madrid

=== Round of 16 ===
The round of 16 matches were played on 20 and 21 February 2018.

Home team	Score	Away team
Bayern Munich (Germany)	2–3	(Spain) Real Madrid
Manchester City (England)	1–1 (3–2 p)	(Italy) Internazionale
Atlético Madrid (Spain)	1–0	(Switzerland) Basel
Porto (Portugal)	3–1	(Austria) Red Bull Salzburg
Paris Saint-Germain (France)	0–1	(Spain) Barcelona
Liverpool (England)	2–0	(England) Manchester United
Tottenham Hotspur (England)	1–1 (3–1 p)	(France) Monaco
Chelsea (England)	5–2	(Netherlands) Feyenoord

=== Quarter-finals ===
The quarter-finals were played on 13 and 14 March 2018.

Home team	Score	Away team
Real Madrid (Spain)	2–4	(England) Chelsea
Manchester City (England)	1–1 (3–2 p)	(England) Liverpool
Barcelona (Spain)	2–0	(Spain) Atlético Madrid
Tottenham Hotspur (England)	0–2	(Portugal) Porto

=== Semi-finals ===
The semi-finals were played on 20 April 2018 at Colovray Stadium, Nyon.

Team 1	Score	Team 2
Manchester City (England)	4–5	(Spain) Barcelona
Chelsea (England)	2–2 (5–4 p)	(Portugal) Porto

=== Final ===
The final was played on 23 April 2018 at Colovray Stadium, Nyon.

23 April 2018
17:00 UTC+2

Chelsea (England)	0–3	(Spain) Barcelona
	Report	Marqués 33', 52'; Ruiz 90+2'

Colovray Stadium, Nyon
Attendance: 7,200
Referee: Andreas Ekberg (Sweden)

== Statistics ==
Notes

- — denotes the team did not participate in this stage.

=== Top goalscorers ===
Rank	Player	Team	Goals			
Rank	Player	Team	GS	DC	KO	Total
1	(Russia) Ivan Ignatyev	(Russia) Krasnodar	—	10	0	10
2	(Spain) Dani Gómez	(Spain) Real Madrid	7	—	0	7
2	(Spain) Carles Pérez	(Spain) Barcelona	4	—	3	7
2	(Russia) Aleksandr Rudenko	(Russia) Spartak Moscow	6	—	1	7
5	(Denmark) Jens Odgaard	(Italy) Internazionale	—	5	1	6
5	(Italy) Andrea Pinamonti	(Italy) Internazionale	—	6	0	6
7	(France) Nabil Alioui	(France) Monaco	4	—	1	5
7	(England) Curtis Jones	(England) Liverpool	4	—	1	5
7	(Turkey) Orkun Kökçü	(Netherlands) Feyenoord	3	—	2	5
7	(Portugal) Rafael Leão	(Portugal) Sporting CP	4	—	1	5
7	(England) Luke McCormick	(England) Chelsea	4	—	1	5
7	(Germany) Manuel Wintzheimer	(Germany) Bayern Munich	5	—	0	5

Source: UEFA

=== Top assists ===
Rank	Player	Team	Assists
1	(Russia) Magomed-Shapi Suleymanov	(Russia) Krasnodar	6
1	(Hungary) Dominik Szoboszlai	(Austria) Red Bull Salzburg	6
3	(France) Moussa Diaby	(France) Paris Saint-Germain	5
3	(Netherlands) Achraf El Bouchataoui	(Netherlands) Feyenoord	5
3	(Portugal) João Filipe	(Portugal) Benfica	5
3	(Spain) Juan Miranda	(Spain) Barcelona	5

Source: UEFA
