= Bessa (name) =

Bessa is a Portuguese surname. Notable people with the surname include:

- Adam Bessa (born 1992), French-Tunisian actor
- Adriano Bessa (born 1976), Portuguese footballer
- Agustina Bessa-Luís (1922–2019), Portuguese writer
- Daniel Bessa (born 1993), Brazilian footballer
- Diogo Bessa (born 1999), Portuguese footballer
- Éber Bessa (born 1992), Brazilian footballer
- Erik Bessa (born 1996), Brazilian footballer
- João Paulo Bessa (born 1947), Portuguese rugby union footballer and coach
