= Pio Schiavi =

Italian footballer

Personal information
- Date of birth: 27 August 1998 (age 28)
- Place of birth: Cava de' Tirreni, Italy
- Height: 1.81 m (5 ft 11 in)
- Position: Defender

Team information
- Current team: Fidelis Andria
- Number: 27

Youth career
- –2014: Juve Stabia
- 2014–2018: Napoli

Senior career*
Years	Team	Apps	(Gls)
2018–2019	Napoli	0	(0)
2018–2019	→ Juve Stabia (loan)	8	(0)
2019–2020	Imolese	13	(0)
2021	Portici	15	(0)
2021–2023	Real Agro Aversa	61	(4)
2023–2024	Portici	24	(4)
2024–2026	Savoia	56	(4)
2026–	Fidelis Andria	0	(0)
- * Club domestic league appearances and goals as of 3 May 2026

Pio Schiavi (born 27 August 1998) is an Italian football player who plays for Serie D club Fidelis Andria.

== Club career ==
=== Napoli ===
He represented Napoli U-19 squad in the 2016–17 UEFA Youth League and 2017–18 UEFA Youth League.

==== Loan to Juve Stabia ====
On 22 July 2018, he joined Serie C club Juve Stabia on loan. He previously played for the junior teams of Juve. He made his Serie C debut for Juve Stabia on 20 November 2018 in a game against Viterbese Castrense as an 83rd-minute substitute for Roberto Vitiello.

=== Imolese ===
On 26 August 2019, he signed with Imolese.

== Personal life ==
His cousin Raffaele Schiavi is also a footballer.
