= Raffaele Schiavi =

Italian footballer

Personal information
- Date of birth: 15 March 1986 (age 40)
- Place of birth: Cava de' Tirreni, Italy
- Height: 1.83 m (6 ft 0 in)
- Position: Centre back

Senior career*
Years	Team	Apps	(Gls)
2002–2005	Salernitana	8	(0)
2005–2010	Lecce	67	(1)
2006	→ Brescia (loan)	4	(0)
2010–2011	Vicenza	38	(3)
2011–2014	Parma	0	(0)
2011–2012	→ Padova (loan)	28	(2)
2012–2013	→ Spezia (loan)	29	(0)
2013–2014	→ Pescara (loan)	22	(0)
2014–2015	Frosinone	10	(0)
2015	Catania	16	(3)
2015–2019	Salernitana	63	(4)
2019–2021	Cosenza	15	(0)
2021–2022	Paganese	10	(0)
2022	Sliema Wanderers	8	(0)
2023	FC Francavilla	5	(0)
Total		323	(13)

Managerial career
- 2025: Cavese (youth)
- 2025–: Benevento U17
- * Club domestic league appearances and goals

Raffaele Schiavi (born 15 March 1986) is an Italian football coach and former footballer who is currently as a head coach for Benevento U17.

== Biography ==
Schiavi's first club was Salernitana, but he only played eight times before joining Lecce in 2005. He had to wait for a chance in the first team however, and had a loan spell at Brescia where he made four appearances. He joined the Serie B team Vicenza Calcio in 2010, in a loan with option to purchase deal. He was a first team regular for Vicenza in the 2010–11 campaign, making 38 appearances with 3 goals.

In June 2011 Vicenza signed him outright, for €750,000. Co-currently Lecce signed the remain 50% registration of Davide Brivio for €750,000.

On 16 July 2011, Schiavi joined the Serie A side Parma F.C. in 5-year contract, also for €750,000 (€600,000 cash plus Marco Pisano). He was loaned to Calcio Padova on the same day.

On 10 July 2014 Schiavi was signed by Serie B club Frosinone in 2-year contract for free. On 19 January 2015 he was sold to Calcio Catania for €200,000.

On 6 August 2015 he was signed by Salernitana in a 3-year contract.

On 2 August 2019, he signed a 2-year contract with Cosenza.

On 12 August 2021, he joined Paganese on a one-year deal. On 29 December 2021, his contract was terminated by mutual consent.

On 18 January 2022, he moved to Sliema Wanderers in Malta.

== Personal life ==
His cousin Pio Schiavi is also a footballer.

On 26 August 2020 he tested positive for COVID-19.
