= Kilian Senkbeil =

German footballer

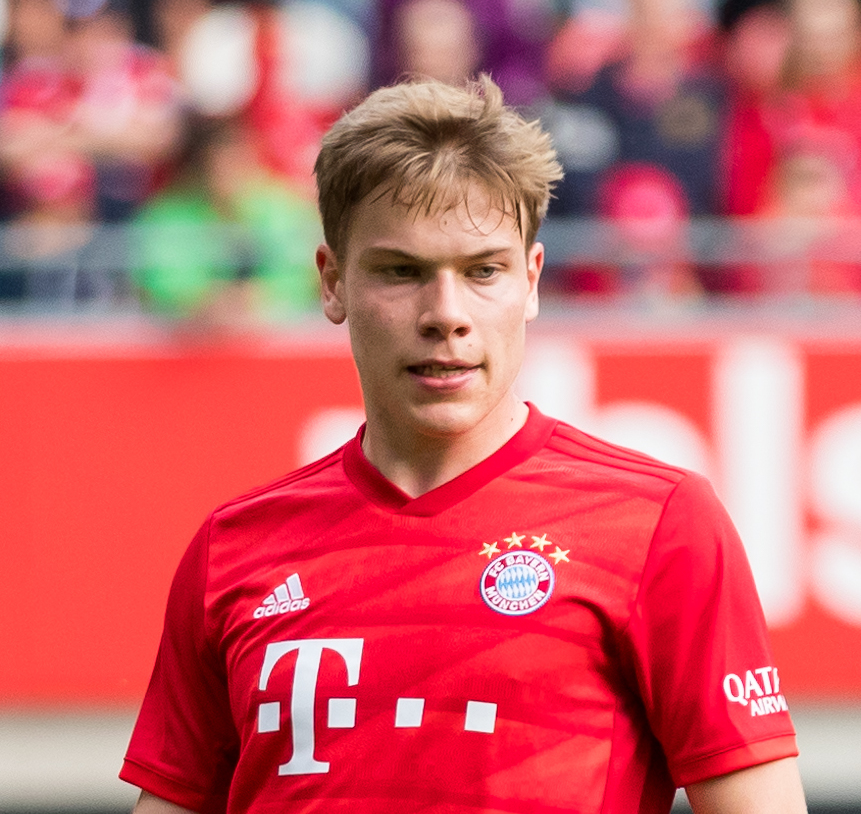
- Kilian Senkbeil (2019)

Personal information
- Full name: Kilian Senkbeil
- Date of birth: 22 May 1999 (age 27)
- Place of birth: Leipzig, Germany
- Height: 1.83 m (6 ft 0 in)
- Position: Centre-back

Team information
- Current team: FSV Zwickau
- Number: 4

Youth career
- –2010: Lokomotive Leipzig
- 2010–2018: RB Leipzig

Senior career*
Years	Team	Apps	(Gls)
2018–2021	Bayern Munich II	36	(0)
2021–2022	ZFC Meuselwitz	19	(0)
2022	FK Auda	9	(0)
2023	SGV Freiberg	14	(2)
2023–	FSV Zwickau	82	(3)

International career^{‡}
2015	Germany U16	1	(0)
2015–2016	Germany U17	3	(0)
2016	Germany U18	2	(1)
2017	Germany U19	1	(0)
- * Club domestic league appearances and goals as of 23 September 2026 ‡ National team caps and goals as of 20 July 2019

Kilian Senkbeil (born 22 May 1999) is a German professional footballer who plays as a centre-back for Regionalliga Nordost club FSV Zwickau. He came through the youth development program of Bayern Munich II.

== Career ==
Senkbeil made his professional debut for Bayern Munich II in the 3. Liga on 20 July 2019, starting in the away match against Würzburger Kickers.

Senkbeil's contract was not extended at the conclusion of the 2020–2021 season and he became a free agent. On 12 November 2021, he was signed as a free agent by ZFC Meuselwitz. At the conclusion of the 2021–2022 season, he moved to Latvia to join Virsliga side FK Auda. After the conclusion of the Latvian season, and on the final day of the winter transfer window on 31 January 2023, Senkbeil joined Regionalliga side SGV Freiberg.

In the summer of 2023, he moved back to the Regionalliga Nordost to play for FSV Zwickau.

== Career statistics ==
=== Club ===
As of match played 26 July 2026

Appearances and goals by club, season and competition
Club	Season	League			National cup		Continental		Other		Total	
Club	Season	Division	Apps	Goals	Apps	Goals	Apps	Goals	Apps	Goals	Apps	Goals
Bayern Munich II	2018–19	Regionalliga Bayern	12	0	—		—		1 (Note: Appearance in the Relegation play-offs)	0	13	0
Bayern Munich II	2019–20	3. Liga	9	0	—		—		—		9	0
Bayern Munich II	2020–21	3. Liga	14	0	—		—		—		14	0
Bayern Munich II	Total		35	0	0	0	0	0	1	0	36	0
ZFC Meuselwitz	2021–22	Regionalliga Nordost	19	0	—		—		3 (Note: Appearance in the Thuringian Cup)	0	22	0
FK Auda	2022	Virsliga	9	0	2	0	—		—		11	0
SGV Freiberg	2022–23	Regionalliga Südwest	14	0	—		—		—		14	0
FSV Zwickau	2023–24	Regionalliga Nordost	26	2	—		—		4 (Note: Appearance in the Saxony Cup)	1	30	3
FSV Zwickau	2024–25	Regionalliga Nordost	25	0	—		—		1	0	26	0
FSV Zwickau	2025–26	Regionalliga Nordost	29	0	—		—		6	0	35	0
FSV Zwickau	2026–27	Regionalliga Nordost	1	0	—		—		0	0	1	0
Total			81	2	0	0	0	0	11	1	92	3
Career total			116	2	2	0	0	0	14	1	132	3
