= Jayden Candelaria =

Curaçaoan association football player (born 2004)

Personal information
- Full name: Jayden Justice Candelaria
- Date of birth: 2 March 2004 (age 22)
- Place of birth: Dordrecht, Netherlands
- Height: 1.84 m (6 ft 0 in)
- Position: Left back

Team information
- Current team: NAC
- Number: 21

Youth career
- –2018: Sparta
- 2018–2025: Feyenoord

Senior career*
| Years | Team | Apps | (Gls) |
| 2025 | Feyenoord | 0 | (0) |
| 2025– | NAC | 8 | (0) |

International career
| 2020 | Netherlands U16 | 2 | (0) |
- * Club domestic league appearances and goals as of 17 May 2026

Jayden Justice Candelaria (born 2 March 2004) is a Dutch professional footballer who plays as defender for Eredivisie side NAC Breda.

== Club career ==
A left-sided defender, he was a youth product at Feyenoord having joined the club in the summer of 2018 from Sparta Rotterdam. He progressed through the academy at Feyenoord, signing a first professional contract with the club as a 17-year-old in 2021, and signed a two-year contract extension in 2024. He played for the club in the UEFA Youth League and won the Dutch junior league in 2025, prior to joining NAC Breda in August 2025. He had offers from elsewhere but chose the club because he has family from Breda, and had watched his first match at the club with his grandfather when he was six years-old. He made his debut in the Eredivisie for Breda against NEC Nijmegen on 24 August 2025 during the 2025–26 season, appearing as a substitute for Lewis Holtby.

== International career ==
Candelaria played 2 games for the Netherlands national under-16 football team.

In 2025, he was called up to the Curacao national football team for their 2026 FIFA World Cup qualifying matches.
