= Délano van der Heijden =

Dutch-Indonesian footballer

Personal information
- Full name: Délano Diego van der Heijden
- Date of birth: 29 September 2004 (age 22)
- Place of birth: Leiden, Netherlands
- Position: Attacking midfielder

Team information
- Current team: Sporting Leiden

Youth career
- 2010–2024: Feyenoord

Senior career*
Years	Team	Apps	(Gls)
2024–2025	Feyenoord	0	(0)
2026	Tolmin	6	(0)
2026-	Sporting Leiden		

International career^{‡}
2019	Netherlands U16	1	(0)
2021	Netherlands U18	1	(0)
- * Club domestic league appearances and goals as of 1 December 2024 ‡ National team caps and goals as of 1 December 2024

Délano Diego van der Heijden (born 29 September 2004) is a Dutch footballer who plays as an attacking midfielder for amateur side Sporting Leiden.

== Club career ==
Van der Heijden is a youth exponent from Feyenoord. He played at various youth levels for the club since joined in 2010. In 2021, he was named to club's UEFA Europa Conference League squad, although he did not get any playing time. He extended his contract with the club in 2023.

== International career ==
Van der Heijden represented the Netherlands under-17 football team, where he debuted in a friendly match against Hungary U16 on 7 November 2019. He is also eligible to represent Indonesia through his Moluccan lineage inherited from his maternal grandmother.

== Personal life ==
Born in the Netherlands, Van der Heijden is of Indonesian descent.

== Career statistics ==
=== Club ===
As of match played 8 September 2024

Appearances and goals by club, season and competition
Club	Season	League			KNVB Cup		League cup		Continental		Other		Total	
Club	Season	Division	Apps	Goals	Apps	Goals	Apps	Goals	Apps	Goals	Apps	Goals	Apps	Goals
Feyenoord	2024–25	Eredivisie	0	0	0	0	–		–		0	0	0	0
Career total			0	0	0	0	0	0	0	0	0	0	0	0

== See also ==
- List of Indonesia international footballers born outside Indonesia
