= Feyenoord Academy (Varkenoord) =

- Full name: Feyenoord Academy
- Ground: Sportcomplex Varkenoord; Rotterdam
- Capacity: 3.531
- Academy Director: (Netherlands) Rini Coolen
- Website: www.feyenoordacademy.com
Home colours	Away colours

Feyenoord Academy, often referred to as Varkenoord, is the youth academy of the professional football club Feyenoord located in Rotterdam, the Netherlands. The Feyenoord Academy is located at Sportcomplex Varkenoord, and has received official international youth academy status from the KNVB.

Feyenoord Academy has been voted as the best developmental system in the Netherlands, winning the Rinus Michels Award for best youth academy five years in a row since 2009. No other academy produced more players for the 2014 FIFA World Cup in Brazil, where eleven former Feyenoord Academy players were active. In May 2010, Feyenoord Academy won the Rinus Michels Award for the first time. Ajax and Sparta Rotterdam were the other nominees. Feyenoord Academy won the award for its innovation within the academy, the overall success of its teams in the national youth leagues and the high number of players in the national youth teams.

== Structure ==
Feyenoord Academy was officially founded in the summer of 2010, when the youth academies of Feyenoord and Excelsior merged. The newly formed academy received the official regional youth academy status from the KNVB and was based on the structure of the former Feyenoord youth academy, with the addition of various Excelsior youth players and staff members. Feyenoord's poor financial situation, the rise in transfer fees and the increase in value of young players signaled a further need for Feyenoord and Excelsior to further support the academy. The cooperation between Feyenoord and Exelsior was terminated as of July 2015, where the academy continued solely as Feyenoord's youth academy. The goal of the Feyenoord Academy is to develop young players into professional football players for Feyenoord's first team squad.

The Feyenoord Academy comprises age-group teams ranging from U8's up to the flagship U19's. The youngest players are scouted at amateur clubs in the direct surroundings of Rotterdam. For the age of twelve and older the academy extends its scouting area, mainly to the remaining part of the Netherlands, Belgium and Scandinavia. Until the U12 team, the players only have training sessions during the evening and are largely guided by part-time coaches. When players are ready to join secondary education they start training during daytime. A close partnership with LOOT-school Thorbecke allows Feyenoord Academy to offer players a full-time training program, while the school adapts its time table to the players training program.

== Teams and players ==
=== Feyenoord U21 ===
Feyenoord U21 plays in the Beloften Eredivisie and the Premier League International Cup. The team plays its home matches at Varkenoord. Between 2010 and 2018 the reserve team was officially disbanded, but kept participating in the Beloften Eredivisie without a permanent squad. The formation varied and consisted of reserve players from Feyenoord's first team squad, with the possible addition of emerging academy players. As of the 2020–21 season, the reserve team has been replaced with an under-21 team.

==== Current squad ====
As of 5 September 2022

Note: Flags indicate national team as defined under FIFA eligibility rules; some limited exceptions apply. Players may hold more than one non-FIFA nationality.

No.	Pos.	Nation	Player
49	GK	NED	Tein Troost
59	GK	NED	Jaimy Kroesen
-	GK	NED	Mannou Berger
51	GK	NED	Devin Remie
40	DF	NED	Guus Baars
52	DF	NED	Milan Hokke
57	DF	NED	Sem Valk
60	DF	NED	Twan van der Zeeuw
62	DF	NED	Jayden Candelaria
56	DF	NED	Kars van Veldhoven
47	MF	TOG	Dermane Karim

No.	Pos.	Nation	Player
64	MF	NED	Gjivai Zechiël
67	MF	IDN	Mike Kleijn
-	MF	FRA	Tidjany Touré
48	MF	NED	Antoni Milambo
50	MF	IDN	Délano van der Heijden
58	MF	NED	Shiloh 't Zand
-	FW	GER	Youssef Amyn
62	FW	SVK	Leo Sauer
63	FW	NED	Jaden Slory
61	FW	MAR	Ilyas el Moussaoui
64	FW	NED	Nesto Groen

==== Staff ====
Position	Staff
Head coach	(Netherlands) Melvin Boel
Assistant coach	(Netherlands) Ulrich van Gobbel

=== Academy graduates in first team squad ===
Name	Age	Pos	Debut
(Netherlands) Bart Nieuwkoop	30 years, 132 days	DF	4 October 2015
(Netherlands) Justin Bijlow	28 years, 294 days	GK	13 August 2017
(Netherlands) Lutsharel Geertruida	26 years, 127 days	DF	25 October 2017
(Netherlands) Antoni Milambo	21 years, 223 days	MF	12 August 2021
(Netherlands) Quilindschy Hartman	24 years, 363 days	DF	21 August 2022
(Netherlands) Gjivai Zechiël	22 years, 164 days	MF	27 August 2023

== Notable former players ==
The following is a list of players who have played in the Feyenoord Academy and represented a country at full international level. Players who are currently playing at Feyenoord are highlighted in bold.

**1900–1970s**

- (Netherlands) Cor Veldhoen (–1956)
- (Netherlands) Hans Venneker (–1964)
- (Netherlands) Wim Jansen (–1965)
- (Netherlands) Jan Everse (–1973)
- (Netherlands) René van der Gijp (1975–1976)
- (Netherlands) Joop Hiele (–1977)
- (Netherlands) Peter Houtman (–1977)
- (Netherlands) Sjaak Troost (–1977)
- (Netherlands) Ben Wijnstekers (–1979)

**1980s**

- (Netherlands) André Hoekstra (–1981)
- (Netherlands) Mario Been (1972–1982)
- (Netherlands) Gaston Taument (–1988)
- (Netherlands Antilles) Raymond Victoria (–1989)

**1990s**

- (Netherlands) Giovanni van Bronckhorst (1981–1993)
- (Netherlands Antilles) Robin Nelisse (–1997)

**2000s**

- (Poland) Ebi Smolarek (1993–2000)
- (Netherlands) Glenn Loovens (1995–2001)
- (Belgium) Gill Swerts (1999–2001)
- (Netherlands) Robin van Persie (1996–2002)
- (Indonesia) Raphael Maitimo (1992–2003)
- (Netherlands) Royston Drenthe (2000–2003)
- (Israel) Samuel Scheimann (1993–2003)
- (Curaçao) Dustley Mulder (2000–2004)
- (Suriname) Diego Biseswar (2001–2005)
- (Netherlands) Jonathan de Guzman (1999–2005)
- (Netherlands) Marten de Roon (2000–2006)
- (Netherlands) Jeffrey Bruma (2006–2007)
- (Netherlands) Leroy Fer (1999–2007)
- (Netherlands) Daryl Janmaat (1995–2007)
- (Netherlands) Georginio Wijnaldum (2004–2007)
- (Netherlands) Anwar El Ghazi (2006–2008)
- (Suriname) Kelvin Leerdam (2005–2008)
- (Netherlands) Miquel Nelom (–2009)
- (Netherlands) Stefan de Vrij (2002–2009)

**2010s**

- (Netherlands) Jordy Clasie (2000–2010)
- (Netherlands) Bruno Martins Indi (2005–2010)
- (Curaçao) Dylan Timber (2008–2010)
- (Netherlands) Nathan Aké (2007–2011)
- (Netherlands) Karim Rekik (2002–2011)
- (Netherlands) Jean-Paul Boëtius (2000–2012)
- (Netherlands) Terence Kongolo (2002–2012)
- (Netherlands) Tonny Vilhena (2003–2012)
- (Netherlands) Vincent Janssen (2009–2013)
- (Netherlands) Rick Karsdorp (2004–2014)
- (Netherlands) Jurriën Timber (2008–2014)
- (Netherlands) Quinten Timber (2008–2014)
- (Cape Verde) Rodny Lopes Cabral (2008–2015)
- (Netherlands) Justin Bijlow (2006–2016)
- (Curaçao) Tahith Chong (2009–2016)
- (Netherlands) Tyrell Malacia (2008–2017)
- (Netherlands) Lutsharel Geertruida (2012–2017)
- (Netherlands) Joshua Zirkzee (2016–2017)
- (Suriname) Dylan Vente (2008–2017)
- (Turkey) Orkun Kökçü (2014–2018)
- (Netherlands) Crysencio Summerville (2008–2019)

**2020s**

- (Netherlands) Quilindschy Hartman (2010–2022)
- (Netherlands) **Gjivai Zechiël** (2018–2023)

== Honours ==
- Rinus Michels Award: 2010, 2011, 2012, 2013, 2014
- National Champions (Under-19): 1963, 1966, 1967, 1968, 1971, 1972, 1981, 2000, 2001, 2009, 2010, 2013
