= Kuku Fidelis =

Nigeiran footballer (born 1999)

Personal information
- Full name: Kuku Emmanuel Fidelis
- Date of birth: 10 March 1999 (age 27)
- Place of birth: Kaduna, Nigeria
- Height: 1.77 m (5 ft 10 in)
- Position: Winger

Team information
- Current team: Al-Shorta
- Number: 23

Youth career
- Gee-Lec Academy
- 2017–2017: Vizela
- 2018: Porto

Senior career*
Years	Team	Apps	(Gls)
2018–2020	Vizela	13	(6)
2020–2021	→ Boavista U23 (loan)	7	(0)
2021	→ Boavista (loan)	6	(0)
2026-	Al-Shorta	12	(1)

International career
2016	Nigeria U17	2	(0)
- * Club domestic league appearances and goals as of 08 November 2026 (UTC)

Kuku Emmanuel Fidelis (born 10 March 1999) is a Nigerian professional footballer who plays as a winger for Al-Shorta.

== Playing career ==
Fidelis is a youth product of the Nigerian Gee-Lec Academy, before moving to the academies of Vizela, and Porto. After starting his senior career with Vizela, he transferred to Boavista on 31 August 2020. He made his professional debut with Boavista in a 2–0 Primeira Liga win over F.C. Paços de Ferreira on 16 April 2021.

== International career ==
Fidelis represented the Nigeria U17s for 2017 Africa U-17 Cup of Nations qualification matches.
