= Erik Bessa =

Brazilian footballer

Personal information
- Full name: Erik da Silva Bessa
- Date of birth: 24 May 1996 (age 30)
- Place of birth: São Paulo, Brazil
- Height: 1.65 m (5 ft 5 in)
- Position: Winger

Youth career
- 2012–2013: Santo André
- 2013–2016: São Caetano

Senior career*
Years	Team	Apps	(Gls)
2016	Mauaense	17	(0)
2017	Catanduvense	2	(0)
2017–2018	EC São Bernardo	37	(3)
2018	São José-SP	27	(3)
2019	Comercial-SP	15	(1)
2019	Marília	22	(4)
2020	Jaraguá-GO	10	(1)
2020	Paysandu	6	(0)
2020–2021	Aparecidense	23	(2)
2021	Atibaia	2	(0)
2021	São Bernardo FC	6	(0)
2022	EC São Bernardo	21	(1)
2022–2023	Marília	29	(8)
2023–2024	Operário Ferroviário	28	(0)
2025	Paraná	5	(0)
2025–	XV de Piracicaba	0	(0)
- * Club domestic league appearances and goals as of 16 October 2024

Erik da Silva Bessa (born 24 May 1996), simply known as Erik Bessa, is a Brazilian professional footballer who plays as a winger.

== Career ==
Having played in the youth sectors of EC Santo André and AD São Caetano, Bessa began his professional career at Mauaense. He played for other teams, especially in the countryside of São Paulo, until in 2020 he played for Jaraguá EC de Goiás, and later, after the start of the COVID-19 pandemic, for Paysandu, where he was state champion. In 2021 he was again champion with São Bernardo FC, and later played for Marília. In April 2023 it was announced by Operário Ferroviário EC.

On 31 December 2024, after two seasons at Operário Ferroviário, Bessa signed with Paraná Clube. After playing for Paraná, Bessa signed with XV de Piracicaba.

== Honours ==
Paysandu

- Campeonato Paraense: 2020

São Bernardo FC

- Copa Paulista: 2021

XV de Piracicaba

- Copa Paulista: 2025
