= Diogo Brás =

Portuguese footballer

Personal information
- Full name: Diogo Daniel Pires Brás
- Date of birth: 16 March 2000 (age 26)
- Place of birth: Chaves, Portugal
- Height: 1.81 m (5 ft 11 in)
- Positions: Full-back; winger

Team information
- Current team: Sogndal
- Number: 2

Youth career
- 2008–2012: Chaves
- 2012–2021: Sporting

Senior career*
Years	Team	Apps	(Gls)
2017–2018	Sporting B	7	(0)
2022–2024	Feirense	29	(0)
2024–2025	União Santarém	16	(0)
2025–	Sogndal	37	(0)

International career^{‡}
2015	Portugal U15	2	(1)
2015–2016	Portugal U16	10	(0)
2016	Portugal U17	3	(0)
2018	Portugal U18	5	(3)
2018	Portugal U19	5	(2)
- * Club domestic league appearances and goals as of 7 July 2026 ‡ National team caps and goals as of 20 November 2018

Diogo Daniel Pires Brás (born 16 March 2000) is a Portuguese professional footballer who plays as a full-back or winger for Norwegian club Sogndal.

== Football career ==
On 14 March 2018, Brás made his professional debut with Sporting B in a 2017–18 LigaPro match against Penafiel.

On 4 August 2022, Brás signed with Feirense in Liga Portugal 2.

He moved abroad to Sogndal in 2025.
