= Adrien Bongiovanni =

Belgian footballer

Personal information
- Date of birth: 20 September 1999 (age 27)
- Place of birth: Seraing, Belgium
- Height: 1.70 m (5 ft 7 in)
- Position: Midfielder

Youth career
- –2015: Standard Liège
- 2015–2017: Monaco

Senior career*
Years	Team	Apps	(Gls)
2016–2018	Monaco B	44	(7)
2017–2021	Monaco	0	(0)
2018–2020	→ Cercle Brugge (loan)	25	(2)
2020	→ Béziers (loan)	5	(0)
2020–2021	→ Den Bosch (loan)	6	(0)
2021–2022	Patro Eisden	0	(0)
2022	Standard Liège II	0	(0)
2022–2023	Charleroi II	33	(13)
2023	Charleroi	1	(0)
2024–2025	RAAL La Louvière	27	(3)
2025	Seraing	4	(0)

International career
2014	Belgium U15	6	(3)
2014–2015	Belgium U16	9	(1)
2015–2016	Belgium U17	9	(1)
- * Club domestic league appearances and goals

Adrien Bongiovanni (born 20 September 1999) is a Belgian former footballer who played as a midfielder.

== Club career ==
=== Monaco ===
Bongiovanni made his professional debut on 26 April 2017 in the Coupe de France semi-final against Paris Saint-Germain replacing Valère Germain in the 60th minute of a 5–0 away loss.

=== Retirement ===
Bongiovanni retired from playing in November 2025 at the age of 26.

== International career ==
Bongiovanni was born in Belgium and is of Italian descent. He is a former youth international for Belgium.

== Career statistics ==
=== Club ===
As of 26 December 2018

Club	Season	League		Cup		League Cup		Europe		Other		Total	
Club	Season	Apps	Goals	Apps	Goals	Apps	Goals	Apps	Goals	Apps	Goals	Apps	Goals
Monaco	2016–17	0	0	1	0	0	0	0	0	—		1	0
Monaco	2017–18	0	0	0	0	0	0	0	0	0	0	0	0
Monaco	Total	0	0	1	0	0	0	0	0	0	0	1	0
Cercle Brugge (loan)	2018–19	11	1	1	0	—		—		—		12	1
Career total		11	1	2	0	0	0	0	0	0	0	13	1
