= Martín Calderón (footballer, born 1999) =

Spanish footballer

Personal information
- Full name: Martín Manuel Calderón Gómez
- Date of birth: 1 March 1999 (age 27)
- Place of birth: Jerez de la Frontera, Spain
- Height: 1.83 m (6 ft 0 in)
- Position: Midfielder

Team information
- Current team: Inter Club d'Escaldes
- Number: 33

Youth career
- 2008–2010: Marianistas
- 2010–2013: Sevilla
- 2013–2018: Real Madrid

Senior career*
Years	Team	Apps	(Gls)
2018–2021	Real Madrid B	42	(1)
2020–2021	→ Paços de Ferreira (loan)	8	(0)
2021–2024	Cádiz	6	(0)
2022	→ Mirandés (loan)	6	(0)
2022–2023	→ Celta B (loan)	27	(1)
2024	→ Sanluqueño (loan)	15	(1)
2024–2025	Sanluqueño	10	(0)
2025–	Inter Club d'Escaldes	24	(1)

International career
2015	Spain U16	3	(0)
2015–2016	Spain U17	5	(0)
2017	Spain U18	2	(0)
2018	Spain U19	3	(0)
- * Club domestic league appearances and goals as of 15 June 2026

Martín Manuel Calderón Gómez (born 1 March 1999) is a Spanish professional footballer who plays as a midfielder for Andorran Primera Divisió club Inter Club d'Escaldes.

== Club career ==
=== Real Madrid ===
Born in Jerez de la Frontera, Cádiz, Andalusia, Calderón joined Real Madrid's La Fábrica in 2013, from Sevilla FC. In July 2018, after finishing his formation, he was promoted to the reserves in Segunda División B.

Calderón made his senior debut with Castilla on 2 September 2018, coming on as a late substitute for Franchu in a 2–2 away draw against Atlético Madrid B. He scored his first senior goal on 21 December, netting the equalizer in a 2–1 home win over Rápido de Bouzas.

==== Paços de Ferreira (loan) ====
On 13 August 2020, Calderón joined Portuguese Primeira Liga side Paços de Ferreira on a one-year loan deal. He made his professional debut on 27 September, replacing Stephen Eustáquio late into a 2–0 home loss to Sporting CP.

Calderón featured rarely while on loan, playing only 171 minutes before returning to Real Madrid in June 2021.

=== Cádiz ===
On 27 July 2021, Calderón signed a three-year contract with La Liga side Cádiz CF. He made his top tier debut on 20 August, replacing Tomás Alarcón late into a 1–1 away draw against Real Betis.

On 6 January 2022, Calderón was loaned to CD Mirandés in Segunda División, for six months. On 31 August, he was loaned to RC Celta de Vigo's reserves for one year.

Upon returning to Cádiz, Calderón spent the first half of the 2023–24 campaign unregistered.

=== Sanluqueño ===
On 12 January 2024, Calderón agreed to a loan deal with Atlético Sanluqueño CF until June. On 16 July, he terminated his link with Cádiz, and signed a permanent deal with the Atletistas the following day.

== Honours ==
Spain U17

- UEFA European Under-17 Championship runner-up: 2016
