= Paulo Estrela =

Portuguese footballer

Personal information
- Full name: Paulo Estrela Moreira Alves
- Date of birth: 20 February 1999 (age 27)
- Place of birth: Paços de Ferreira, Portugal
- Height: 1.71 m (5 ft 7 in)
- Position: Midfielder

Team information
- Current team: Flamurtari
- Number: 20

Youth career
- 2007–2009: Paços Ferreira
- 2009–2018: Porto
- 2014–2015: → Padroense (loan)

Senior career*
Years	Team	Apps	(Gls)
2018–2019	Porto B	14	(0)
2019–2022	Portimonense U23	73	(10)
2022–2025	Portimonense	47	(2)
2025–2026	Skënderbeu	40	(1)
2025–	Flamurtari	4	(0)

International career
2014–2015	Portugal U16	5	(1)
2015	Portugal U17	5	(0)
2017	Portugal U18	4	(0)
- * Club domestic league appearances and goals as of 15:13, 10 October 2026 (UTC)

Paulo Estrela Moreira Alves (born 20 February 1999) is a Portuguese professional footballer who plays as a midfielder for Kategoria e Parë club Flamurtari.

== Club career ==
=== Porto ===
Estrela was born in Paços de Ferreira, Porto District. He joined FC Porto's academy at the age of 10.

On 7 March 2018, Estrela played his first match as a professional with the B team, coming on as a second-half substitute in a 6–0 away loss against C.D. Nacional in the LigaPro.

=== Portimonense ===
In June 2019, Estrela signed a three-year contract with Primeira Liga club Portimonense SC, being initially assigned to its under-23 team where he acted as captain. He only made his league debut on 16 April 2022, as a late substitute in the 7–0 defeat at former side Porto.

Estrela scored his first goal in the top division on 16 September 2022, the only in a win over G.D. Chaves through a penalty.

=== Albania ===
On 8 January 2025, Estrela severed his ties to Portimonense and agreed to a two-and-a-half-year deal with KF Skënderbeu, bottom of the Albanian Kategoria Superiore. Team and player were eventually relegated at the end of the season.

Estrela remained in the Kategoria e Parë in the 2026–27 campaign, joining Flamurtari FC.

== International career ==
Estrela represented Portugal at youth level. He scored his only goal on 25 March 2015, in a 5–0 victory over Azerbaijan in an under-16 friendly tournament.
