= Diogo Bessa =

Portuguese footballer

Personal information
- Full name: José Diogo Bessa Rocha Ferreira
- Date of birth: 16 January 1999 (age 27)
- Place of birth: Valongo, Portugal
- Height: 1.73 m (5 ft 8 in)
- Position: Left-back

Team information
- Current team: Vilaverdense

Youth career
- 2007–2009: Boavista
- 2009–2010: CB Póvoa Lanhoso
- 2010–2018: Porto
- 2014–2015: → Padroense (loan)

Senior career*
Years	Team	Apps	(Gls)
2019–2021	Porto B	25	(0)
2021–2022	La Nucía	1	(0)
2023–2024	Znojmo	14	(1)
2025	SC Pombal	9	(1)
2026–	Vilaverdense	0	(0)

International career^{‡}
2014–2015	Portugal U16	9	(0)
2015	Portugal U17	2	(0)
2017	Portugal U18	3	(0)
- * Club domestic league appearances and goals as of 01:20, 18 January 2026 (UTC) ‡ National team caps and goals as of 01:20, 18 January 2026 (UTC)

José Diogo Bessa Rocha Ferreira (born 16 January 1999) is a Portuguese professional footballer who plays as a left-back for Campeonato de Portugal club Vilaverdense.

== Club career ==
Bessa made his LigaPro debut for FC Porto B on 19 April 2019 in a game against Sporting Covilhã.

On 31 August 2021, he joined Spanish fourth-tier club La Nucía.

On 5 December 2023, Bessa moved to the Czech Republic, joining third-division side Znojmo.

On 21 January 2025, Bessa returned to Portugal, signing for Campeonato de Portugal club SC Pombal. One year later, he joined Vilaverdense, of the same division.
