= Diogo Queirós =

Portuguese footballer

Personal information
- Full name: Diogo Lucas Queirós
- Date of birth: 5 January 1999 (age 27)
- Place of birth: Matosinhos, Portugal
- Height: 1.85 m (6 ft 1 in)
- Positions: Centre-back; defensive midfielder

Team information
- Current team: Al-Najma
- Number: 3

Youth career
- 2007–2010: Leixões
- 2010–2018: Porto

Senior career*
Years	Team	Apps	(Gls)
2017–2020	Porto B	47	(1)
2019–2020	→ Mouscron (loan)	19	(1)
2020–2023	Famalicão	22	(0)
2021–2022	→ Valladolid (loan)	5	(0)
2023–2024	Farul Constanța	31	(1)
2024–2025	Dunkerque	18	(1)
2025–2026	Al-Jabalain	33	(4)
2026–	Al-Najma	2	(1)

International career
2015	Portugal U16	6	(0)
2015–2016	Portugal U17	18	(0)
2016–2018	Portugal U19	21	(3)
2017–2019	Portugal U20	10	(1)
2019–2021	Portugal U21	16	(4)
Medal record
Men's football
Representing Portugal
UEFA European Under-21 Championship
Runner-up	2021 Hungary–Slovenia
UEFA European Under-19 Championship
Winner	2018 Finland
Runner-up	2017 Georgia
UEFA European Under-17 Championship
Winner	2016 Azerbaijan
- * Club domestic league appearances and goals as of 17:01, 31 August 2026 (UTC)

Diogo Lucas Queirós (born 5 January 1999) is a Portuguese professional footballer who plays as a centre-back or a defensive midfielder for Saudi First Division League club Al-Najma.

== Club career ==
=== Porto ===
Born in Matosinhos, Porto District, Queirós joined Porto's youth system at the age of 11 from local club Leixões. He made his debut as a senior on 27 August 2017, playing 90 minutes for the reserve team in a 1–0 home win against Santa Clara in the LigaPro. The previous June, he had renewed his contract until 2021.

On 27 August 2019, Queirós was loaned to Mouscron of the Belgian Pro League. His maiden appearance in the competition took place three days later, in a 2–2 away draw with Mechelen. He played 21 total games during his spell, and scored in a 2–0 home victory over Kortrijk on 15 September.

=== Famalicão ===
Queirós signed a three-year deal with Famalicão on 6 October 2020. He appeared in his first Primeira Liga match on 7 November, starting and finishing the 2–1 home defeat of Marítimo.

On 31 August 2021, Queirós moved to Spanish Segunda División side Real Valladolid on a one-year loan with an option to buy. The following 30 January, after just eight competitive appearances, his loan was cut short.

Queirós totalled only three games in his last two seasons at the Estádio Municipal 22 de Junho.

=== Farul Constanța ===
On 21 June 2023, Queirós joined Farul Constanța of the Romanian Liga I. He made his official debut on 8 July, in a 1–0 loss against Sepsi OSK in the Supercupa României. He scored his first goal the following month, closing the 3–0 home win over Flora in the third qualifying round of the UEFA Europa Conference League.

=== Later career ===
Queirós continue to compete abroad subsequently, having one-year spells at Dunkerque in the French Ligue 2 and Al-Jabalain in the Saudi First Division League.

== International career ==
Queirós won the 2018 UEFA European Under-19 Championship with Portugal. He started the first game against Italy, being sent off in the 3–2 loss for his only appearance in the tournament.

Queirós was also part of the squad at the 2019 FIFA U-20 World Cup. He played three matches in the group-stage exit.

On 5 September 2019, Queirós won his first cap at under-21 level, scoring in the 4–0 win over Gibraltar for the 2021 European Championship qualifiers. Selected for the finals as captain, he opened a 3–0 victory against Switzerland in the group phase for the eventual runners-up.

== Career statistics ==
As of match played 10 May 2025

Appearances and goals by club, season and competition
Club	Season	League			National cup (Note: Includes Taça de Portugal, Belgian Cup and Cupa României)		League cup (Note: Includes Taça da Liga)		Continental		Other		Total	
Club	Season	Division	Apps	Goals	Apps	Goals	Apps	Goals	Apps	Goals	Apps	Goals	Apps	Goals
Porto B	2017–18	LigaPro	21	0	—		—		—		6 (Note: Appearances in Premier League International Cup)	0	27	0
Porto B	2018–19	LigaPro	26	1	—		—		—		2	0	28	1
Porto B	Total		47	1	—		—		—		8	0	55	1
Mouscron (loan)	2019–20	Belgian Pro League	19	1	2	0	—		—		—		21	1
Famalicão	2020–21	Primeira Liga	20	0	2	1	0	0	—		—		22	1
Famalicão	2021–22	Primeira Liga	1	0	0	0	0	0	—		—		1	0
Famalicão	2022–23	Primeira Liga	1	0	1	0	0	0	—		—		2	0
Famalicão	Total		22	0	3	1	0	0	—		—		25	1
Valladolid (loan)	2021–22	Segunda División	5	0	3	0	—		—		—		8	0
Farul Constanța	2023–24	Liga I	27	1	3	0	—		3	1	1	0	34	2
Farul Constanța	2024–25	Liga I	4	0	0	0	—		—		—		4	0
Farul Constanța	Total		31	1	3	0	—		3	1	1	0	38	2
Dunkerque	2024–25	Ligue 2	16	1	5	0	—		—		0	0	21	1
Career total			140	4	16	1	0	0	3	1	9	0	168	6

== Honours ==
Porto Youth

- UEFA Youth League: 2018–19

Farul Constanța

- Supercupa României runner-up: 2023

Portugal

- UEFA European Under-17 Championship: 2016
- UEFA European Under-19 Championship: 2018
- UEFA European Under-21 Championship runner-up: 2021

Individual

- UEFA European Under-19 Championship Team of the Tournament: 2017
- UEFA European Under-21 Championship Team of the Tournament: 2021

Orders

- Medal of the Order of Merit
