= Ilya Mazurov =

Russian footballer

Personal information
- Full name: Ilya Alekseyevich Mazurov
- Date of birth: 7 June 1999 (age 27)
- Place of birth: Tashkent, Uzbekistan
- Height: 1.82 m (6 ft 0 in)
- Position: Midfielder

Youth career
- –2019: FC Spartak Moscow

Senior career*
| Years | Team | Apps | (Gls) |
| 2018–2019 | FC Spartak-2 Moscow | 9 | (0) |
| 2019–2022 | FC Fakel Voronezh | 53 | (4) |
| 2020–2021 | → FC Fakel-M Voronezh | 2 | (0) |
| 2021–2022 | → FC SKA Rostov-on-Don (loan) | 18 | (3) |
| 2022 | FC Balashikha | 17 | (2) |

International career
| 2016 | Russia U-18 | 7 | (3) |
- * Club domestic league appearances and goals as of 9 November 2022

Ilya Alekseyevich Mazurov (Russian: Илья Алексеевич Мазуров; born 7 June 1999) is a Russian football player.

== Club career ==
He made his debut in the Russian Football National League for FC Spartak-2 Moscow on 17 July 2018 in a game against PFC Sochi.
