= Joao Maleck =

Mexican footballer (born 1999)

Personal information
- Full name: Junior Joao Maleck Robles
- Date of birth: 13 March 1999 (age 27)
- Place of birth: Guadalajara, Jalisco, Mexico
- Height: 1.84 m (6 ft 0 in)
- Position: Forward

Team information
- Current team: Plaza Colonia

Youth career
- 2011–2014: Guadalajara
- 2014–2017: Santos Laguna
- 2017–2018: → Porto (loan)

Senior career*
Years	Team	Apps	(Gls)
2017–2023	Santos Laguna	0	(0)
2018	→ Porto B (loan)	1	(0)
2019	→ Sevilla B (loan)	3	(0)
2021	→ CAFESSA Jalisco (loan)	8	(3)
2021–2022	→ Coras de Tepic (loan)	27	(13)
2022–2023	→ Tepatitlán (loan)	20	(6)
2023	UAT	5	(0)
2024–2025	Morelia	25	(2)
2025–2026	Guadalupe	32	(8)
2026–	Plaza Colonia	0	(0)

International career
2016–2017	Mexico U18	1	(2)
2018–2019	Mexico U20	2	(1)
- * Club domestic league appearances and goals as of 16 September 2026

Junior Joao Maleck Robles (born 13 March 1999) is a Mexican professional footballer who plays as a forward for Uruguayan Segunda División club Plaza Colonia.

== Legal issues ==
On 23 June 2019, Maleck was involved in a deadly car accident in his hometown of Guadalajara. The crash claimed the lives of a newlywed couple. At the time, he was speeding and driving while intoxicated when his vehicle collided with the victims' car.

On 23 October 2020, Maleck was convicted of two charges of aggravated homicide. He received a sentence of three years and eight months in prison, along with a financial penalty. However, local laws permit Maleck to be released from prison within fifteen days if he pays the fines. On 15 December 2020, he was granted parole after serving less than half of his sentence.

At the time, Maleck was on loan at Sevilla Atlético. The club parted ways with him just one week after the accident. While in prison, Maleck agreed a contract extension with Santos Laguna. He was later registered with the club's U-20 team.

== Personal life ==
Maleck is of Cameroonian descent. His father is Jean-Claude Maleck a former footballer who played for Tecos UAG and San Luis.

== See also ==
- Afro-Mexicans
