= Harvey St Clair =

Scottish footballer (born 1998)

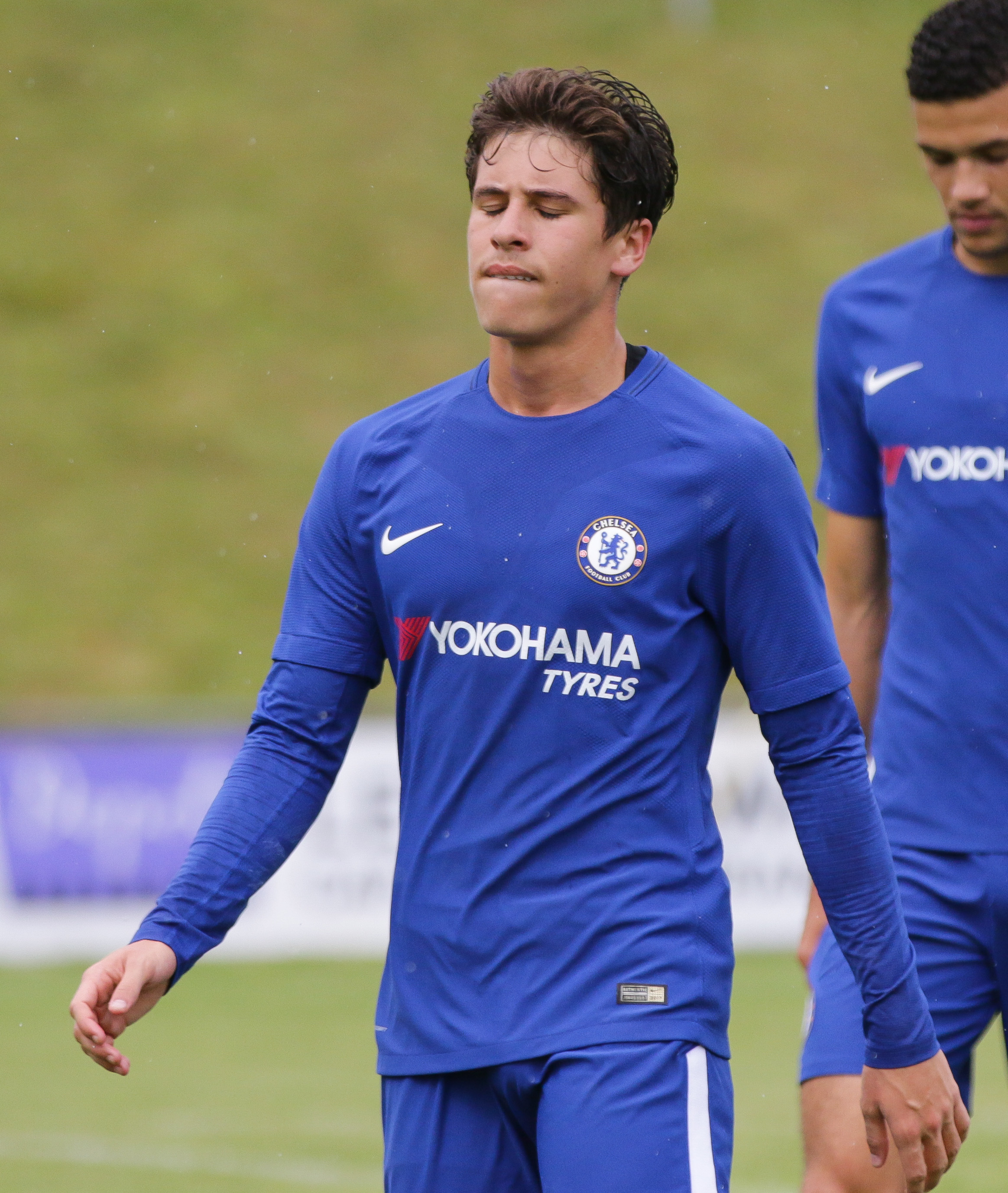
- St Clair with Chelsea in 2017

Personal information
- Date of birth: 13 November 1998 (age 27)
- Place of birth: Kingston upon Thames, England
- Position: Winger

Team information
- Current team: FC Tulsa
- Number: 47

Youth career
- 2006–2018: Chelsea

Senior career*
Years	Team	Apps	(Gls)
2018–2023	Venezia	21	(0)
2019–2020	→ Kilmarnock (loan)	2	(0)
2021–2022	→ Seregno (loan)	17	(0)
2022	→ Triestina (loan)	13	(2)
2023	→ Vis Pesaro (loan)	15	(0)
2024–	FC Tulsa	52	(1)

International career^{‡}
2014	Scotland U17	3	(1)
2015–2016	Scotland U19	5	(0)
2018	Scotland U20	1	(0)
2018	Scotland U21	3	(0)
- * Club domestic league appearances and goals as of 17:00, 11 November 2026 (UTC) ‡ National team caps and goals as of 19:04, 23 August 2018 (UTC)

Harvey St Clair (born 13 November 1998) is a professional footballer who plays as a winger for USL Championship club FC Tulsa. Born in England, he represented Scotland at youth level.

== Club career ==
St Clair joined Chelsea as an 8-year-old, and played for their under-18 team when he was 15. After 12 years at the club, he turned down a new contract and instead signed for four years at Serie B side Venezia in June 2018.

On 23 August 2018, St Clair made his senior debut for Venezia in the Coppa Italia, starting in the 1–0 home loss to Serie C side Südtirol. After injury ruled him out of the opening weeks of the season, St Clair made his Serie B debut on 30 October as an 88th-minute substitute for Francesco Di Mariano in a 1–0 away win over Cremonese. He made his first Serie B start on 30 March 2019 in a 1–1 draw away to Salernitana.

On 2 September 2019, St Clair signed for Scottish Premiership club Kilmarnock on a season-long loan. He made his debut twenty days later in a 3–1 loss at holders Celtic, as a 72nd-minute substitute for Liam Millar.

On 31 January 2022, St Clair joined Serie C Triestina on loan.

On 27 January 2023, St Clair moved to Vis Pesaro in Serie C and signed a contract until the end of the season.

On 1 September 2023, he left Venezia by mutual consent.

On 7 February 2024, St Clair signed with FC Tulsa for the 2024 USL Championship season.

== International career ==
Born and raised in London, St Clair qualified for Scotland through his mother, Heather, coming from Edinburgh. He made his debut for the under-17 team in their European qualifier against the Faroe Islands. This was at Eamonn Deacy Park in Galway, Ireland on 22 September 2014 and scored in a 4–0 win before a crowd of 25 people in a 'tornado'. In March 2018, he was first called up to the under-21 team. In June that year at the 2018 Toulon Tournament the Scots came fourth, with St Clair winning a penalty in the third-place match against Turkey, which was saved by Altay Bayındır.

== Career statistics ==
As of 17 October 2022

Appearances and goals by club, season and competition
Club	Season	League			National Cup		League Cup		Other		Total	
Club	Season	Division	Apps	Goals	Apps	Goals	Apps	Goals	Apps	Goals	Apps	Goals
Venezia	2018–19	Serie B	12	0	1	0	—		—		13	0
Venezia	2019–20	Serie B	0	0	1	0	—		—		1	0
Venezia	2020–21	Serie B	7	0	2	0	—		—		9	0
Venezia	2022-23	Serie B	1	0	0	0	0	0	0	0	1	0
Venezia	Total		20	0	4	0	—		—		24	0
Kilmarnock (loan)	2019–20	Scottish Premiership	2	0	0	0	1	0	0	0	3	0
Seregno(loan)	2021–22	Serie C	17	0	0	0	2	0	0	0	19	0
Triestina (loan)	2021–22	Serie C	13	2	0	0	0	0	3	0	16	2
Career total			52	2	4	0	1	0	3	0	62	2
