= Alberto Salido =

Spanish footballer

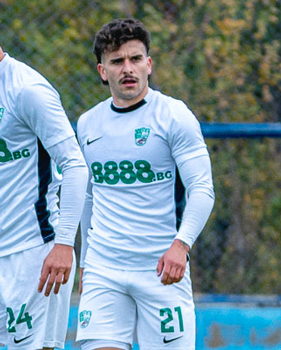

Personal information
- Full name: Alberto Salido Tejero
- Date of birth: 19 January 2000 (age 26)
- Place of birth: Palma, Spain
- Height: 1.71 m (5 ft 7 in)
- Positions: Forward; attacking midfielder

Team information
- Current team: Botev Plovdiv (on loan from Ludogorets)
- Number: 7

Youth career
- –2014: Mallorca
- 2014–2020: Atlético Madrid

Senior career*
Years	Team	Apps	(Gls)
2019–2021	Atlético Madrid B	10	(1)
2020	→ Arenas Club (loan)	6	(1)
2020–2021	→ Córdoba (loan)	2	(0)
2021	→ Mallorca B (loan)	6	(0)
2021–2022	Las Rozas	35	(10)
2022–2023	Leganés B	27	(4)
2023–2024	Montijo	19	(6)
2024	La Unión Atlético	14	(4)
2024–2026	Beroe	50	(19)
2026–	Ludogorets Razgrad	17	(0)
2026–	→ Botev Plovdiv (loan)	2	(1)
- * Club domestic league appearances and goals as of 14:39, 19 September 2026 (UTC)

Alberto Salido Tejero (born 19 January 2000) is a Spanish professional footballer who plays as a forward for Bulgarian First League club Botev Plovdiv, on loan from Ludogorets Razgrad.

== Career ==
Born in Palma de Mallorca, he started his youth career at Mallorca, before moving to Atlético Madrid. He was a top goalscorer of Juventil B and was promoted to Atlético Madrid B in 2019. In January 2020 he was sent on loan to Arenas Club. On 5 October 2020 he was sent on loan to Córdoba until end of season. His loan was cut short and he returned to his parent club on 2 February 2021. He made a brief return to his birth place and youth team, as he was sent on loan to Mallorca B in February 2021, to return to Atletico in August. On 7 October 2021, after 7 years with Atleti, he completed his move to Tercera División RFEF team Las Rozas.

On 21 July 2023 he was presented as the new signing of Montijo. In February 2024 he moved to La Unión Atlético.

Alberto decided to leave Spain and moved to Bulgaria, to join First League team Beroe in June 2024. He scored the 2100th goal for Beroe in the league on 18 February 2025. He ended the season with 12 goals and 5 assists, with Marca marking the huge progress of the player, after moving to Bulgaria. On 11 August 2025 he scored his first hat-trick with the team in a 3–2 win over Septemvri Sofia.

On 22 February 2026 he missed the league match of Beroe and instead was in the stadium to say goodbye to the crowd as Salido was heavily linked with a move to the title contender CSKA 1948. On 24 February 2026, in the last day of winter transfer window, Beroe confirmed he would leave the team, but few hours later he was surprisingly presented by another title contender Ludogorets Razgrad.

== Career statistics ==
As of match played 2 June 2026

Appearances and goals by club, season and competition
Club	Season	League			National cup (Note: Includes Bulgarian Cup)		Continental		Other		Total	
Club	Season	Division	Apps	Goals	Apps	Goals	Apps	Goals	Apps	Goals	Apps	Goals
Atlético Madrid B	2018–19	Segunda División B	4	0	—		—		—		4	0
Atlético Madrid B	2019–20	Segunda División B	6	1	—		—		—		6	1
Atlético Madrid B	Total		10	1	—		—		—		10	1
Arenas Club (loan)	2019–20	Segunda División B	6	1	0	0	—		—		6	1
Córdoba (loan)	2020–21	Segunda División B	2	0	0	0	—		—		2	0
Mallorca B (loan)	2020–21	Tercera División	6	0	—		—		—		6	0
Las Rozas CF	2021–22	Tercera División RFEF	35	10	0	0	—		1 (Note: Appearance in Tercera División RFEF play-offs)	0	36	10
CD Leganés B	2022–23	Segunda Federación	27	4	—		—		—		27	4
Montijo	2023–24	Segunda Federación	19	6	0	0	—		—		19	6
La Unión Atlético	2023–24	Segunda Federación	14	4	0	0	—		—		14	4
Beroe	2024–25	Bulgarian First League	30	9	3	3	—		—		33	12
Beroe	2025–26	Bulgarian First League	20	10	3	2	—		—		23	12
Beroe	Total		50	19	6	5	0	0	0	0	56	24
Ludogorets	2025–26	Bulgarian First League	11	0	1	0	0	0	0	0	12	0
Career total			180	45	7	5	0	0	1	0	190	50
