= Aleksandr Rudenko (footballer, born 1999) =

Russian footballer

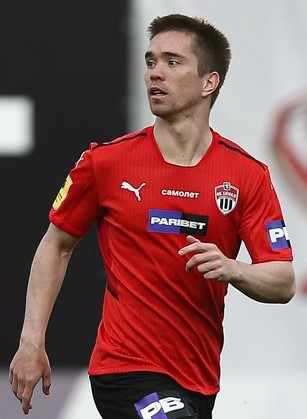
- Rudenko with Khimki in 2022

Personal information
- Full name: Aleksandr Aleksandrovich Rudenko
- Date of birth: 15 March 1999 (age 27)
- Place of birth: Daryevka, Rodionovo-Nesvetaysky District, Rostov Oblast, Russia
- Height: 1.73 m (5 ft 8 in)
- Position: Striker

Team information
- Current team: Lokomotiv Moscow
- Number: 19

Youth career
- –2010: DYuSSh Vesyoly
- 2011–2012: Ponedelnik Academy Rostov-on-Don
- 2012–2016: Spartak Moscow

Senior career*
Years	Team	Apps	(Gls)
2016–2021	Spartak Moscow	0	(0)
2016–2019	→ Spartak-2 Moscow	107	(25)
2020	→ Torpedo Moscow (loan)	2	(1)
2020–2021	→ Sochi (loan)	20	(2)
2021	→ Spartak-2 Moscow	3	(0)
2022–2025	Khimki	96	(25)
2023	→ Khimki-M	2	(0)
2025–	Lokomotiv Moscow	43	(9)

International career^{‡}
2014	Russia U-15	2	(1)
2014–2015	Russia U-16	6	(2)
2015–2016	Russia U-17	16	(7)
2016–2017	Russia U-18	8	(3)
2017	Russia U-19	6	(1)
- * Club domestic league appearances and goals as of 22 November 2026 ‡ National team caps and goals as of 14 November 2017

Aleksandr Aleksandrovich Rudenko (Russian: Александр Александрович Руденко; born 15 March 1999) is a Russian football player who plays as a striker for Lokomotiv Moscow. He played as a left winger in his early career.

== Club career ==
Rudenko made his debut in the Russian Football National League for Spartak-2 Moscow on 11 July 2016 in a game against Sibir Novosibirsk.

On 26 December 2019 he joined Torpedo Moscow on loan until the end of the 2019–20 season.

On 25 July 2020 Rudenko moved to Sochi on loan for the 2020–21 season, with an option to purchase.

On 19 February 2022, Rudenko signed a contract with Khimki until the end of the 2023–24 season.

On 19 June 2025, Rudenko joined Lokomotiv Moscow on a three-season contract.

== Career statistics ==
As of match played 22 November 2026

Appearances and goals by club, season and competition
Club	Season	League			Cup		Europe		Other		Total	
Club	Season	Division	Apps	Goals	Apps	Goals	Apps	Goals	Apps	Goals	Apps	Goals
Spartak-2 Moscow	2016–17	Russian First League	22	1	—		—		4 (Note: Appearances in the FNL Cup)	0	26	1
Spartak-2 Moscow	2017–18	Russian First League	27	3	—		—		3	1	30	4
Spartak-2 Moscow	2018–19	Russian First League	35	8	—		—		3	1	38	9
Spartak-2 Moscow	2019–20	Russian First League	23	13	—		—		—		23	13
Spartak-2 Moscow	2021–22	Russian First League	3	0	—		—		—		3	0
Spartak-2 Moscow	Total		110	25	—		—		10	2	120	27
Spartak Moscow	2018–19	Russian Premier League	0	0	0	0	0	0	—		0	0
Spartak Moscow	2019–20	Russian Premier League	0	0	0	0	0	0	—		0	0
Spartak Moscow	Total		0	0	0	0	0	0	0	0	0	0
Torpedo Moscow (loan)	2019–20	Russian First League	2	1	1	0	—		—		3	1
Sochi (loan)	2020–21	Russian Premier League	20	2	4	0	—		—		24	2
Khimki	2021–22	Russian Premier League	11	2	—		—		1 (Note: Appearance in the relegation play-offs)	0	12	2
Khimki	2022–23	Russian Premier League	25	4	4	1	—		—		29	5
Khimki	2023–24	Russian First League	31	13	2	0	—		—		33	13
Khimki	2024–25	Russian Premier League	29	6	6	1	—		—		35	7
Khimki	Total		96	25	12	2	—		1	0	109	27
Khimki-M	2023	Russian Second League B	2	0	—		—		—		2	0
Lokomotiv Moscow	2025–26	Russian Premier League	28	7	10	0	—		—		38	7
Lokomotiv Moscow	2026–27	Russian Premier League	15	2	4	0	—		—		19	2
Lokomotiv Moscow	Total		43	9	14	0	—		—		57	9
Career total			270	62	30	2	0	0	11	2	311	66
