= AS Monaco FC Reserves and Academy =

Association football club statistics

The AS Monaco Reserves and Academy are the reserve team and academy of Monégasque football club AS Monaco. Notable graduates of the academy include Kylian Mbappé, Thierry Henry, Lilian Thuram, Emmanuel Petit, and David Trezeguet, all of whom have won the FIFA World Cup.

== Reserve squad ==
As of 31 January 2023

Note: Flags indicate national team as defined under FIFA eligibility rules; some limited exceptions apply. Players may hold more than one non-FIFA nationality.

| No. | Pos. | Nation | Player |
|---|---|---|---|
| 33 | FW | FRA | Valentin Decarpentrie |
| 48 | DF | ALG | Nazim Babaï |
| — | GK | MAR | Yanis Benchaouch |
| — | DF | FRA | Ritchy Valme |
| — | DF | FRA | Bradel Kiwa |
| — | MF | FRA | Anis Soubeir |
| — | MF | FRA | Mamidou Coulibaly |

| No. | Pos. | Nation | Player |
|---|---|---|---|
| — | MF | FRA | Mayssam Benama |
| — | MF | FRA | Saïmon Bouabré |
| — | FW | FRA | Lucas Michal |
| — | FW | FRA | Malamine Efekele |
| — | FW | FRA | Romaric Etonde |
