= 2017–18 UEFA Youth League Domestic Champions Path =

European club football tournament

The 2017–18 UEFA Youth League Domestic Champions Path was played from 27 September to 22 November 2017. A total of 32 teams competed in the Domestic Champions Path to decide 8 of the 24 places in the knockout phase of the 2017–18 UEFA Youth League.

Times up to 28 October 2017 (first round) were CEST (UTC+2), thereafter (second round) times were CET (UTC+1).

== Draw ==
The youth domestic champions of the top 32 associations according to their 2016 UEFA country coefficients entered the Domestic Champions Path. If there was a vacancy (associations with no youth domestic competition, as well as youth domestic champions already included in the UEFA Champions League path), it was first filled by the title holders should they have not yet qualified, and then by the youth domestic champions of the next association in the UEFA ranking. For the Domestic Champions Path, the 32 teams were drawn into two rounds of two-legged home-and-away ties. The draw was held on 29 August 2017, 14:00 CEST, at the UEFA headquarters in Nyon, Switzerland. There were no seedings, but the 32 teams were split into groups defined by sporting and geographical criteria prior to the draw.

- In the first round, the 32 teams were split into four groups. Teams in the same group were drawn against each other, with the order of legs decided by draw.
- In the second round, the 16 winners of the first round were split into two groups: Group A contained the winners from Groups 1 and 2, while Group B contained the winners from Groups 3 and 4. Teams in the same group were drawn against each other, with the order of legs decided by draw.

Key to colours
Second round winners advanced to the play-offs

Group 1 Team (Italy) Internazionale (Ukraine) Dynamo Kyiv (Romania) Dinamo București (Croatia) Lokomotiva Zagreb (Bulgaria) Ludogorets Razgrad (Moldova) Zimbru Chișinău (Bosnia and Herzegovina) Željezničar (Albania) Vllaznia	Group 2 Team (Netherlands) Ajax (Poland) Legia Warsaw (Sweden) Hammarby IF (Norway) Molde (Denmark) Esbjerg (Iceland) Breiðablik (Finland) KäPa (Republic of Ireland) UCD	Group 3 Team (France) Bordeaux (Czech Republic) Sparta Prague (Austria) Red Bull Salzburg (Slovakia) Nitra (Hungary) Honvéd (North Macedonia) Shkëndija (Luxembourg) F91 Dudelange (Montenegro) Sutjeska	Group 4 Team (Russia) Krasnodar (Turkey) Bursaspor (Belarus) Shakhtyor Soligorsk (Israel) Maccabi Haifa (Serbia) Brodarac (Kazakhstan) Kairat (Georgia (country)) Saburtalo Tbilisi (Latvia) Liepāja

== Format ==
In both rounds, if the aggregate score was tied after full-time of the second leg, the away goals rule was used to decide the winner. If still tied, the match was decided by a penalty shoot-out (no extra time was played). The eight second round winners advanced to the play-offs, where they were joined by the eight group runners-up from the UEFA Champions League Path.

== First round ==
=== Summary ===
The first legs were played on 26 and 27 September, and the second legs were played on 17 and 18 October 2017.

Team 1	Agg.	Team 2	1st leg	2nd leg
Internazionale (Italy)	5–2	(Ukraine) Dynamo Kyiv	2–2	3–0
Zimbru Chișinău (Moldova)	7–3	(Albania) Vllaznia	3–1	4–2
Ludogorets Razgrad (Bulgaria)	3–4	(Bosnia and Herzegovina) Željezničar	1–1	2–3
Dinamo București (Romania)	2–4	(Croatia) Lokomotiva Zagreb	0–2	2–2
KäPa (Finland)	2–4 (Note: Order of legs reversed after original draw.)	(Denmark) Esbjerg	1–2	1–2
Breiðablik (Iceland)	1–3	(Poland) Legia Warsaw	1–3	0–0
UCD (Republic of Ireland)	3–3 (4–5 p)	(Norway) Molde	2–1	1–2
Hammarby IF (Sweden)	0–6	(Netherlands) Ajax	0–4	0–2
Bordeaux (France)	0–5	(Austria) Red Bull Salzburg	0–1	0–4
Nitra (Slovakia)	2–1	(North Macedonia) Shkëndija	1–0	1–1
F91 Dudelange (Luxembourg)	1–7	(Czech Republic) Sparta Prague	0–4	1–3
Sutjeska (Montenegro)	2–3	(Hungary) Honvéd	2–2	0–1
Brodarac (Serbia)	2–1	(Israel) Maccabi Haifa	1–1	1–0
Kairat (Kazakhstan)	2–11	(Russia) Krasnodar	2–2	0–9
Liepāja (Latvia)	2–4	(Belarus) Shakhtyor Soligorsk	2–1	0–3
Bursaspor (Turkey)	1–2	(Georgia (country)) Saburtalo Tbilisi	0–1	1–1

=== Matches ===
27 September 2017
14:00

Internazionale (Italy)	2–2	(Ukraine) Dynamo Kyiv
Pinamonti 69' (pen.); Odgaard 71'	Report	Tsitaishvili 10'; Shaparenko 67'

Stadio Breda, Sesto San Giovanni
Attendance: 600
Referee: Nenad Djokić (Serbia)
18 October 2017
13:00

Dynamo Kyiv (Ukraine)	0–3	(Italy) Internazionale
	Report	Pinamonti 10', 29'; Odgaard 73'

Valeriy Lobanovskyi Dynamo Stadium, Kyiv
Attendance: 1,641
Referee: Cătălin Gaman (Romania)

Internazionale won 5–2 on aggregate.

26 September 2017
18:00

Zimbru Chișinău (Moldova)	3–1	(Albania) Vllaznia
Stînă 23'; Donțu 77'; Iurașco 80'	Report	Pusi 86' (pen.)

Zimbru Stadium, Chișinău
Attendance: 1,100
Referee: Zaven Hovhannisyan (Armenia)
18 October 2017
18:00

Vllaznia (Albania)	2–4	(Moldova) Zimbru Chișinău
Pusi 24'; Furtună 45' (o.g.)	Report	Donțu 12'; Stînă 52'; Scoarță 76'; Iurașco 90+4'

Loro Boriçi Stadium, Shkodër
Attendance: 2,000
Referee: Dimitrios Massias (Cyprus)

Zimbru Chișinău won 7–3 on aggregate.

27 September 2017
15:00

Ludogorets Razgrad (Bulgaria)	1–1	(Bosnia and Herzegovina) Željezničar
Beširević 88' (o.g.)	Report	Mujagić 63'

PFC Ludogorets 1945 Training Centre, Razgrad
Attendance: 463
Referee: Alexandru Tean (Moldova)
18 October 2017
18:00

Željezničar (Bosnia and Herzegovina)	3–2	(Bulgaria) Ludogorets Razgrad
Dacić 3'; Mujagić 56'; Hajdarević 90+3'	Report	Klimentov 7'; Milkov 70'

Stadion Grbavica, Sarajevo
Attendance: 2,763
Referee: Anastasios Papapetrou (Greece)

Željezničar won 4–3 on aggregate.

26 September 2017
15:00

Dinamo București (Romania)	0–2	(Croatia) Lokomotiva Zagreb
	Report	Kastrati 26'; Dunić 52' (pen.)

Stadionul Dinamo, Bucharest
Attendance: 514
Referee: Giorgi Kruashvili (Georgia)
18 October 2017
15:00

Lokomotiva Zagreb (Croatia)	2–2	(Romania) Dinamo București
Krajinović 42'; Vranjković 90'	Report	Vasile 37' (pen.); Cretu 87'

Stadion Lučko, Zagreb
Attendance: 270
Referee: Ádám Farkas (Hungary)

Lokomotiva Zagreb won 4–2 on aggregate.

27 September 2017
13:00

KäPa (Finland)	1–2	(Denmark) Esbjerg
Kiuru 28'	Report	Olsen 38'; Egelund 69'

Myyrmäen jalkapallostadion, Vantaa
Attendance: 523
Referee: Mohammed Al-Hakim (Sweden)
18 October 2017
14:00

Esbjerg (Denmark)	2–1	(Finland) KäPa
Møller 15'; Egelund 26'	Report	Kiuru 48'

Blue Water Arena, Esbjerg
Attendance: 1,503
Referee: Aleksandrs Golubevs (Latvia)

Esbjerg won 4–2 on aggregate.

27 September 2017
18:00

Breiðablik (Iceland)	1–3	(Poland) Legia Warsaw
Ingimarsson 30'	Report	Neuman 56'; Wełniak 66', 79'

Kópavogsvöllur, Kópavogur
Attendance: 420
Referee: Manfredas Lukjancukas (Lithuania)
17 October 2017
18:00

Legia Warsaw (Poland)	0–0	(Iceland) Breiðablik
	Report

Polish Army Stadium, Warsaw
Attendance: 1,500
Referee: Dejan Jakimovski (Macedonia)

Legia Warsaw won 3–1 on aggregate.

27 September 2017
19:30

UCD (Republic of Ireland)	2–1	(Norway) Molde
Lovic 44'; McDonald 45'	Report	Østigård 13'

UCD Bowl, Dublin
Attendance: 429
Referee: Iwan Arwel Griffith (Wales)
18 October 2017
18:30

Molde (Norway)	2–1	(Republic of Ireland) UCD
Gussiås 33'; Østigård 48'	Report	Ryan 51'
Penalties
Markovic (penalty scored); Østigård (penalty scored); Breivik (penalty scored); Haaland (penalty scored); T. Svendsen (penalty missed); H. Svendsen (penalty scored)	5–4	(penalty scored) Lovic; (penalty scored) Dignam; (penalty missed) Ryan; (penalty scored) Manley; (penalty scored) Farrugia; (penalty missed) Boore

Aker Stadion, Molde
Attendance: 435
Referee: Anders Poulsen (Denmark)

3–3 on aggregate; Molde won 5–4 on penalties.

26 September 2017
19:00

Hammarby IF (Sweden)	0–4	(Netherlands) Ajax
	Report	Ekkelenkamp 51', 53'; Nunnely 70'; Gravenberch 90'

Stockholm Olympic Stadium, Stockholm
Attendance: 1,712
Referee: Alex Troleis (Faroe Islands)
17 October 2017
19:00

Ajax (Netherlands)	2–0	(Sweden) Hammarby IF
Ylätupa 35'; Nunnely 87'	Report

Sportpark De Toekomst, Ouder-Amstel
Attendance: 520
Referee: Nicolas Laforge (Belgium)

Ajax won 6–0 on aggregate.

26 September 2017
17:00

Bordeaux (France)	0–1	(Austria) Red Bull Salzburg
	Report	Schmid 33'

Complexe Robert Monseau, Saint-Médard-en-Jalles
Attendance: 542
Referee: Luis Miguel Branco Godinho (Portugal)
17 October 2017
18:00

Red Bull Salzburg (Austria)	4–0	(France) Bordeaux
L. Meisl 3'; M. Meisl 6'; Gazibegović 22'; Schmidt 37'	Report

Untersberg-Arena, Grödig
Attendance: 1,140
Referee: Sascha Amhof (Switzerland)

Red Bull Salzburg won 5–0 on aggregate.

27 September 2017
18:00

Nitra (Slovakia)	1–0	(North Macedonia) Shkëndija
Koša 49'	Report

Štadión pod Zoborom, Nitra
Attendance: 2,550
Referee: Aleksei Matyunin (Russia)
17 October 2017
14:30

Shkëndija (North Macedonia)	1–1	(Slovakia) Nitra
Rasimi 25'	Report	Chobot 7'

Training Centre Petar Miloševski, Skopje
Attendance: 253
Referee: Zaven Hovhannisyan (Armenia)

Nitra won 2–1 on aggregate.

27 September 2017
17:00

F91 Dudelange (Luxembourg)	0–4	(Czech Republic) Sparta Prague
	Report	Mareček 7'; Drchal 35', 65'; Frýdek 90+3'

Stade Jos Nosbaum, Dudelange
Attendance: 500
Referee: Luis Teixeira (Portugal)
18 October 2017
17:00

Sparta Prague (Czech Republic)	3–1	(Luxembourg) F91 Dudelange
Maksić 57'; Fišl 82'; Flak 85'	Report	Omosanya 30'

Generali Arena, Prague
Attendance: 659
Referee: Roomer Tarajev (Estonia)

Sparta Prague won 7–1 on aggregate.

27 September 2017
18:00

Sutjeska (Montenegro)	2–2	(Hungary) Honvéd
Bećirović 68'; Marušić 72'	Report	Bíró 20'; Stoiacovici 62'

Gradski stadion, Nikšić
Attendance: 1,000
Referee: Boris Marhefka (Slovakia)
18 October 2017
17:00

Honvéd (Hungary)	1–0	(Montenegro) Sutjeska
Májer 24'	Report

Bozsik Stadion, Budapest
Attendance: 2,465
Referee: Michal Ocenáš (Slovakia)

Honvéd won 3–2 on aggregate.

27 September 2017
17:00

Brodarac (Serbia)	1–1	(Israel) Maccabi Haifa
Mitrović 90'	Report	Dahan 13'

Sports Center of FA of Serbia, Stara Pazova
Attendance: 1,500
Referee: Pavel Orel (Czech Republic)
18 October 2017
17:00

Maccabi Haifa (Israel)	0–1	(Serbia) Brodarac
	Report	Babović 20'

Sammy Ofer Stadium, Haifa
Attendance: 1,600
Referee: Enea Jorgji (Albania)

Brodarac won 2–1 on aggregate.

27 September 2017
15:00

Kairat (Kazakhstan)	2–2	(Russia) Krasnodar
Shvyrev 29'; Alip 81'	Report	Ignatyev 45+1'; Utkin 45+2'

Almaty Central Stadium, Almaty
Attendance: 2,500
Referee: Halil Umut Meler (Turkey)
18 October 2017
16:00

Krasnodar (Russia)	9–0	(Kazakhstan) Kairat
Utkin 7'; Suleymanov 12'; Ignatyev 15', 20', 51', 57', 75' (pen.); Kurazhov 58', 90+1'	Report

Krasnodar Academy Stadium, Krasnodar
Attendance: 1,650
Referee: Jari Järvinen (Finland)

Krasnodar won 11–2 on aggregate.

27 September 2017
18:00

Liepāja (Latvia)	2–1	(Belarus) Shakhtyor Soligorsk
Fogelis 37'; Smetanovs 74'	Report	Kozel 6'

Daugava Stadium, Liepāja
Attendance: 672
Referee: Genc Nuza (Kosovo)
17 October 2017
17:30

Shakhtyor Soligorsk (Belarus)	3–0	(Latvia) Liepāja
Tsevan 30'; Kutsepalov 73'; Bal 87'	Report

Stroitel Stadium, Salihorsk
Attendance: 260
Referee: Kirill Levnikov (Russia)

Shakhtyor Soligorsk won 4–2 on aggregate.

27 September 2017
16:00

Bursaspor (Turkey)	0–1	(Georgia (country)) Saburtalo Tbilisi
	Report	Kapanadze 26'

Timsah Arena, Bursa
Attendance: 1,500
Referee: Furkat Atazhanov (Kazakhstan)
18 October 2017
18:00

Saburtalo Tbilisi (Georgia (country))	1–1	(Turkey) Bursaspor
Tabatadze 85'	Report	Yılmaz 1'

David Petriashvili Stadium, Tbilisi
Attendance: 1,800
Referee: Dumitri Muntean (Moldova)

Saburtalo Tbilisi won 2–1 on aggregate.

== Second round ==
=== Summary ===
The first legs were played on 29, 31 October and 1 November, and the second legs were played on 21 and 22 November 2017.

Team 1	Agg.	Team 2	1st leg	2nd leg
Zimbru Chișinău (Moldova)	0–2	(Norway) Molde	0–0	0–2
Lokomotiva Zagreb (Croatia)	1–1 (a)	(Bosnia and Herzegovina) Željezničar	1–1	0–0
Internazionale (Italy)	10–1	(Denmark) Esbjerg	4–1	6–0
Legia Warsaw (Poland)	3–4	(Netherlands) Ajax	1–4	2–0
Brodarac (Serbia)	3–3 (a)	(Georgia (country)) Saburtalo Tbilisi	1–1	2–2
Shakhtyor Soligorsk (Belarus)	2–3	(Slovakia) Nitra	2–0	0–3
Krasnodar (Russia)	9–1	(Hungary) Honvéd	8–0	1–1
Sparta Prague (Czech Republic)	2–6	(Austria) Red Bull Salzburg	2–4	0–2

=== Matches ===
1 November 2017
16:00

Zimbru Chișinău (Moldova)	0–0	(Norway) Molde
	Report

Zimbru Stadium, Chișinău
Attendance: 477
Referee: Sándor Andó-Szabó (Hungary)
22 November 2017
18:00

Molde (Norway)	2–0	(Moldova) Zimbru Chișinău
Gussiås 74'; Hestad 90+2'	Report

Aker Stadion, Molde
Attendance: 412
Referee: Vilhjalmur Thorarinsson (Iceland)

Molde won 2–0 on aggregate.

31 October 2017
14:00

Lokomotiva Zagreb (Croatia)	1–1	(Bosnia and Herzegovina) Željezničar
Vranjković 73'	Report	Beširević 42'

Stadion Lučko, Zagreb
Attendance: 180
Referee: Oleksandr Derdo (Ukraine)
22 November 2017
16:00

Željezničar (Bosnia and Herzegovina)	0–0	(Croatia) Lokomotiva Zagreb
	Report

Stadion Grbavica, Sarajevo
Attendance: 4,820
Referee: Juri Frischer (Estonia)

1–1 on aggregate; Željezničar won on away goals.

1 November 2017
14:30

Internazionale (Italy)	4–1	(Denmark) Esbjerg
Pinamonti 38'; Rover 42', 73'; Odgaard 54' (pen.)	Report	Larsen 23'

Stadio Breda, Sesto San Giovanni
Attendance: 800
Referee: Mario Zebec (Croatia)
22 November 2017
16:00

Esbjerg (Denmark)	0–6	(Italy) Internazionale
	Report	Schirò 5'; Odgaard 31', 60'; Pinamonti 50', 72' (pen.); Visconti 62'

Blue Water Arena, Esbjerg
Attendance: 694
Referee: Ian McNabb (Northern Ireland)

Internazionale won 10–1 on aggregate.

31 October 2017
18:00

Legia Warsaw (Poland)	1–4	(Netherlands) Ajax
Bakboord 31' (o.g.)	Report	Sierhuis 42', 81'; Sidoel 53'; Jensen 90+2'

Polish Army Stadium, Warsaw
Attendance: 1,500
Referee: Horatiu Fesnic (Romania)
21 November 2017
16:00

Ajax (Netherlands)	0–2	(Poland) Legia Warsaw
	Report	Żyro 14'; Cichocki 47'

Sportpark De Toekomst, Ouder-Amstel
Attendance: 476
Referee: Mykola Balakin (Ukraine)

Ajax won 4–3 on aggregate.

1 November 2017
17:00

Brodarac (Serbia)	1–1	(Georgia (country)) Saburtalo Tbilisi
Kočić 20'	Report	Nikolashvili 83'

Sports Center of FA of Serbia, Stara Pazova
Attendance: 800
Referee: Barbeno Luca (San Marino)
22 November 2017
15:00

Saburtalo Tbilisi (Georgia (country))	2–2	(Serbia) Brodarac
Kokhreidze 79'; Tabatadze 90+2'	Report	Pejić 20'; Lukić 58'

Mikheil Meskhi Stadium, Tbilisi
Attendance: 2,103
Referee: Omar Pashayev (Azerbaijan)

3–3 on aggregate; Brodarac won on away goals.

29 October 2017
14:00

Shakhtyor Soligorsk (Belarus)	2–0	(Slovakia) Nitra
Kutsepalov 52' (pen.); Bal 55' (pen.)	Report

Stroitel Stadium, Salihorsk
Attendance: 400
Referee: Jørgen Burchardt (Denmark)
21 November 2017
17:00

Nitra (Slovakia)	3–0	(Belarus) Shakhtyor Soligorsk
Fábry 37'; Dojčinovič 50', 64'	Report

Štadión pod Zoborom, Nitra
Attendance: 760
Referee: Edin Jakupović (Bosnia and Herzegovina)

Nitra won 3–2 on aggregate.

1 November 2017
15:00

Krasnodar (Russia)	8–0	(Hungary) Honvéd
Ignatyev 5', 22', 58', 84'; Borodin 31'; Sergeyev 53', 56'; Kurazhov 86'	Report

Krasnodar Academy Stadium, Krasnodar
Attendance: 970
Referee: Suren Baliyan (Armenia)
22 November 2017
16:00

Honvéd (Hungary)	1–1	(Russia) Krasnodar
Balint 51'	Report	Kurazhov 67'

Bozsik Stadion, Budapest
Attendance: 1,000
Referee: Luis Teixeira (Portugal)

Krasnodar won 9–1 on aggregate.

1 November 2017
17:00

Sparta Prague (Czech Republic)	2–4	(Austria) Red Bull Salzburg
Sedláček 27'; Maksić 90+2'	Report	Schmidt 6', 29'; L. Meisl 51'; Meister 56'

Generali Arena, Prague
Attendance: 1,189
Referee: Bojan Nikolić (Serbia)
21 November 2017
18:00

Red Bull Salzburg (Austria)	2–0	(Czech Republic) Sparta Prague
Meister 41'; Schmidt 55'	Report

Untersberg-Arena, Grödig
Attendance: 952
Referee: Mikhail Vilkov (Russia)

Red Bull Salzburg won 6–2 on aggregate.
