= 2018–19 Danish Cup =

DBU Pokalen (The DBU Cup)

Tournament details
- Country: Denmark
- Teams: 102

Final positions
- Champions: Midtjylland
- Runners-up: Brøndby
- UEFA Europa League: Midtjylland

Tournament statistics
- Matches played: 101

The 2018–19 Danish Cup, also known as Sydbank Pokalen, was the 65th season of the Danish Cup competition. The winners of the tournament, Midtjylland, earned qualification into the third qualifying round of the 2019–20 UEFA Europa League.

== Structure ==
88 teams, representing all levels of competition, participated in the 44 first-round matches. Eight more teams from the two highest divisions entered round two while the remaining six teams from the 2018-19 Danish Superliga joined the competition in the third round.

== Participants ==
102 teams competed for the Danish Cup. All teams from the top three divisions in 2017–18 are automatically entered while lower division teams play qualifying matches to enter the competition.

=== 2018–19 Alka Superliga ===
Club	Entered in	Eliminated in	Eliminated by
AC Horsens	3rd Round	4th Round	AaB
AGF	2nd Round	4th Round	Næstved BK
Brøndby	3rd Round	Final	FC Midtjylland
Esbjerg fB	2nd Round	Quarterfinals	OB
F.C. Copenhagen	3rd Round	4th Round	FC Midtjylland
FC Midtjylland	3rd Round	Champion	
FC Nordsjælland	3rd Round	4th Round	Vendsyssel FF
Hobro IK	2nd Round	4th Round	OB
OB	2nd Round	Semifinals	FC Midtjylland
Randers FC	2nd Round	3rd Round	Kolding IF
SønderjyskE	2nd Round	4th Round	Esbjerg fB
Vejle BK	2nd Round	4th Round	Kolding IF
Vendsyssel FF	2nd Round	Quarterfinals	Brøndby
AaB	3rd Round	Semifinals	Brøndby IF

=== 2018–19 NordicBet Liga ===
Club	Entered in	Eliminated in	Eliminated by
FC Fredericia	1st Round	3rd Round	SønderjyskE
FC Helsingør	1st Round	2nd Round	Næstved BK
FC Roskilde	1st Round	3rd Round	AaB
Fremad Amager	1st Round	2nd Round	FC Roskilde
HB Køge	1st Round	3rd Round	FC Nordsjælland
Hvidovre IF	1st Round	1st Round	Fremad Amager
Lyngby BK	1st Round	1st Round	Nykøbing FC
Nykøbing FC	1st Round	3rd Round	Vejle BK
Næstved BK	1st Round	Quarterfinals	AaB
Silkeborg IF	1st Round	3rd Round	Næstved BK
Thisted FC	1st Round	3rd Round	OB
Viborg FF	1st Round	2nd Round	FC Fredericia

=== 2018–19 Danish 2nd Division ===
Club	2017–18 League	Entered in	Eliminated in	Eliminated by
Akademisk Boldklub	Group 2	1st Round	2nd Round	OB
Aarhus Fremad	Group 1	1st Round	3rd Round	AGF Aarhus
BK Avarta	Group 2	1st Round	2nd Round	B1908
B93	Group 2	1st Round	2nd Round	HB Køge
Brabrand IF	Group 1	1st Round	2nd Round	Silkeborg IF
Brønshøj BK	Group 2	1st Round	1st Round	Herlev IF
Dalum IF	Group 1	1st Round	3rd Round	FC Midtjylland
BK Frem	Group 2	1st Round	2nd Round	Velje BK
HIK	Group 2	1st Round	2nd Round	Nykøbing FC
Hillerød Fodbold	Group 2	1st Round	3rd Round	Brøndby IF
Jammerbugt FC	Group 1	1st Round	3rd Round	Esbjerg fB
Kjellerup IF	Group 1	1st Round	2nd Round	Middelfart G&BK
Kolding IF	Group 1	1st Round	Quarterfinals	FC Midtjylland
BK Marienlyst	Group 2	1st Round	4th Round	Brøndby IF
Middelfart G&BK	Group 2	1st Round	3rd Round	AC Horsens
Odder IGF	Group 1	1st Round	1st Round	Dalum IF
Ringkøbing IF	Group 1	1st Round	1st Round	Skive IK
Skive IK	Group 1	1st Round	2nd Round	Viby IF
Skovshoved IF	Group 2	1st Round	1st Round	BK Frem
Slagelse B&I	Group 2	1st Round	1st Round	FC Helsingør
FC Sydvest 05	Group 1	1st Round	2nd Round	AGF Aarhus
Tarup-Paarup IF	Group 1	1st Round	2nd Round	Thisted FC
Vejgaard BK	Group 1	1st Round	1st Round	Aarhus Fremad

=== DBU Bornholm ===
Club	2017–18 League	Entered in	Eliminated in	Eliminated by
NB Bornholm	Copenhagen Series	1st Round	2nd Round	Hillerød Fodbold

=== DBU Funen ===
Club	2017–18 League	Entered in	Eliminated in	Eliminated by
B1913	Denmark Series	1st Round	1st Round	Kolding IF
FC BiH Odense	Series 1	1st Round	1st Round	Bramdrupdam GIF
Fjordager IF	Series 1	1st Round	1st Round	Middelfart G&BK
Næsby BK	Denmark Series	1st Round	2nd Round	Randers FC
Nørre Aaby IK	Albani Series	1st Round	1st Round	Tarup-Paarup IF
OKS	Albani Series	1st Round	1st Round	BK Marienlyst
Otterup B&IK	Denmark Series	1st Round	1st Round	Hedensted IF
Ringe BK	Series 1	1st Round	1st Round	FC Fredericia

=== DBU Jutland ===
Club	2017–18 League	Entered in	Eliminated in	Eliminated by
Agerbæk/Starup	Jutland Series	1st Round	1st Round	Næsby BK
Birkelse	Series 2	1st Round	1st Round	Thisted FC
Bramdrupdam	Series 2	1st Round	2nd Round	Dalum IF
Egen UI	Series 1	1st Round	2nd Round	Vendsyssel FF
FC Djursland	Denmark Series	1st Round	2nd Round	Jammerbugt FC
FC Skanderborg	Jutland Series	1st Round	1st Round	Egen UI
Fuglebakken KFUM	Jutland Series	1st Round	1st Round	Kjellerup IF
Hedensted IF	Denmark Series	1st Round	2nd Round	Aarhus Fremad
Herning KFUM	Series 4	1st Round	1st Round	Silkeborg KFUM
Hirtshals	Series 1	1st Round	1st Round	Brabrand IF
Holstebro BK	Denmark Series	1st Round	1st Round	Silkeborg IF
IF Lyseng	Denmark Series	1st Round	2nd Round	Hobro IK
Nørresundby FB	Denmark Series	1st Round	1st Round	Viby IF
SGI/SSK	Series 1	1st Round	1st Round	FC Sydvest 05
Silkeborg KFUM	Denmark Series	1st Round	2nd Round	Kolding IF
Tjørring IF	Jutland Series	1st Round	1st Round	IF Lyseng
Vatanspor	Denmark Series	1st Round	1st Round	FC Djursland
Viby IF	Denmark Series	1st Round	3rd Round	F.C. Copenhagen
Vildbjerg SF	Jutland Series	1st Round	1st Round	Viborg FF
VSK Aarhus	Denmark Series	1st Round	1st Round	Jammerbugt FC

=== DBU Copenhagen ===
Club	2017–18 League	Entered in	Eliminated in	Eliminated by
AB Tårnby	Denmark Series	1st Round	1st Round	Hørsholm-Usserød IK
B1908	Denmark Series	1st Round	3rd Round	BK Marienlyst
CBS Sport	Series 1	1st Round	1st Round	GVI
BK Fremad Valby	Denmark Series	1st Round	1st Round	AB
GVI	Denmark Series	1st Round	2nd Round	SønderjyskE
IF Føroyar	Copenhagen Series	1st Round	1st Round	Hillerød Fodbold
Tårnby FF	Copenhagen Series	1st Round	2nd Round	Hundested IK
Union	Denmark Series	1st Round	1st Round	Hundested IK

=== DBU Lolland-Falster ===
Club	2017–18 League	Entered in	Eliminated in	Eliminated by
Døllefjelde-Musse	Zealand Series	1st Round	1st Round	B1908
FC Nakskov	Zealand Series	1st Round	1st Round	BK Avarta
Listrup	Lolland-Falster Series	1st Round	1st Round	Frem Bjæverskov

=== DBU Zealand ===
Club	2017–18 League	Entered in	Eliminated in	Eliminated by
FC Rudersdal	Series 2	1st Round	1st Round	NB Bornholm
Frem Bjæverskov	Series 2	1st Round	2nd Round	Ledøje-Smørum
FK Greve	Denmark Series	1st Round	1st Round	FC Roskilde
Herlev IF	Denmark Series	1st Round	2nd Round	BK Marienlyst
Holbæk B&I	Denmark Series	1st Round	1st Round	HIK
Humlebæk BK	Series 2	1st Round	1st Round	HB Køge
Hundested IK	Series 1	1st Round	3rd Round	Vendsyssel FF
Hørsholm-Usserød IK	Series 1	1st Round	2nd Round	Esbjerg fB
Karlslunde IF	Denmark Series	1st Round	1st Round	Næstved BK
Ledøje-Smørum	Denmark Series	1st Round	3rd Round	Hobro IK
IF Skjold Birkerød	Denmark Series	1st Round	1st Round	B93
Stenløse BK	Zealand Series	1st Round	1st Round	Ledøje-Smørum
Vordingborg IF	Series 1	1st Round	1st Round	Tårnby FF

== First round ==
In the first round of the tournament the teams are divided into a West and East pool. In the West Pool, 46 teams participate, divided into two pools, the "Funen / Jutland Pool" and "Jutland Pool". The East Pool consists of 42 teams and is not split up.

The draw was held on Friday, 22 June 2018.

=== West, Jutland ===
7 August 2018	Herning KFUM (9)	0–5	Silkeborg KFUM (4)	KFUM Sports Center, Herning
18:00		DBU Report	Johansen 30'; C. Hoe 46'; F. Hoe 52'; Skibsted 72', 75'	Referee: Lasse Læbel Graagaard

7 August 2018	Nørresundby FB (4)	1–3	Viby IF (4)	Lindholm Høje Stadium, Nørresundby
18:00	Kjeldsen (yellow card) 46'; Jensen 58'; Toft (yellow card) 83'	DBU Report	Krogh 7'; Mortensen 9'; Christensen (yellow card) 19'; Matras 90'; Ilsø (yellow card) 93'	Referee: Morten Bach Jepsen

7 August 2018	Tjørring IF (5)	0–1	IF Lyseng (4)	Hessel Arena, Herning
18:00		DBU Report	Berwald 75'	Referee: Aydin Uslu

7 August 2018	VSK Aarhus (4)	0–3	Jammerbugt FC (3)	Vejlby-Risskov Idrætscenter, Vejlby
18:00	Spornberger (yellow card) 41'	DBU Report	Nielsen 18'; Møller 28'; Thomsen 55'	Referee: Rasmus Nielsen

8 August 2018	Birkelse IF (7)	0–10	Thisted FC (2)	Nordjyske Bank Arena, Aabybro
18:00	Sabanovic (yellow card) 69'; Villadsen (yellow card) 79'	DBU Report	Pedersen 3'; Stefansen (yellow card) 33' (goal) 36'; Heimer 41', 51'; Vang 43'; Hedegaard 52'; Lagergaard (yellow card) 53'; Sørensen (yellow card) 58' (goal) 88'; Tukiainen 72', 84', 90' (pen.)	Attendance: 200; Referee: Henrik Overgaard

8 August 2018	FC Djursland (4)	3–1	Vatanspor (4)	HSM Arena Grenå, Grenå
18:00	Gertsen (yellow card) 57'; Kaagh 59'; Faizi 71'; Bruun 75'	DBU Report	Paikar 26'; Günes (yellow card) 27'; Alici (yellow card) 80'	Referee: Jacob Tornbjerg Rasmussen

8 August 2018	Fuglebakken KFUM (5)	1–4	Kjellerup IF (3)	Højlyngen, Aarhus
18:00	Jensen 22'	DBU Report	Vestergaard 8'; Dahl 62', 92'; Denius 75'	Referee: Nils Heer

8 August 2018	Hirtshals BK (6)	0–9	Brabrand IF (3)	Schlie Arena, Hirtshals
18:00	Langagergaard (yellow card) 42'; Thomsen (yellow card) 51'; Gravesen (yellow card) 75'	DBU Report	Jørgensen 37', 41', 47'; Søjberg 67'; Kaljo 73'; Kharoub 77', 78', 87'; Poulsen 83'	Referee: Nikolaj Boddum Pedersen

8 August 2018	Holstebro BK (4)	0–4	Silkeborg IF (2)	Holstebro Idrætspark, Holstebro
18:00	Kiilerich (yellow card) 34'	DBU Report	Okkels 22'; Skhirtladze 42', 44'; Jørgensen 65'	Referee: Aydin Uslu

8 August 2018	Ringkøbing IF (3)	1–5	Skive IK (3)	Green Arena, Ringkøbing
18:00	Ebbensgaard; Lauridsen (yellow card)	DBU Report	Jensen; Petersen; Denius; Christensen; Bak (yellow card)	Referee: Morten Krogh

8 August 2018	Vejgaard BK (3)	1–1 (a.e.t.)	Aarhus Fremad (3)	Soffy Road, Aalborg
18:00	Mondrup (yellow card) 1'; Stranghold (yellow card) 70'; Sloth-Kristensen (yellow card) 85' (goal) 94'	DBU Report	Kristensen 63'; Habibi (yellow card) 82'; Damgaard (yellow card) 111'	Referee: Michael Rasmussen
	Penalties
	Jørgensen (penalty scored); Mortensen (penalty scored); Olsen (penalty scored)		Høgh (penalty scored); Kristensen (penalty scored); Thomsen (penalty scored); Damgaard (penalty scored); Habibi (penalty scored)

8 August 2018	Vildbjerg SF (5)	0–10	Viborg FF (2)	Vildbjerg Sports and Culture Center, Vildbjerg
18:00	Dahl (yellow card) 80'	DBU Report	Moses 15', 16', 65', 69'; Andersen 24'; Nielsen 52'; Mensah 58'; Thychosen 60'; Own goal 73', 90'	Referee: Chris Johansen

=== West, Funen/Jutland ===
7 August 2018	Agerbæk/Starup (5)	1–2	Næsby BK (4)	Starup Stadium, Grindsted
18:00	Andreasen 17' (Risager); Rasksen (yellow card) 90'	DBU Report	Pedersen 57' (pen.); Lehm 90'	Referee: Morten Bertelsen

7 August 2018	Egen UI (6)	2–1	FC Skanderborg (5)	Guderup Idrætsanlæg, Nordborg
18:00	Spanggaard (yellow card); Fedders; Krath (yellow card); Kristensen (yellow card); Heesch (yellow card); Poulsen (yellow card)	DBU Report	Nielsen; Linnig (yellow card)	Referee: Martin Outzen

7 August 2018	Fjordager IF (6)	1–5	Middelfart G&BK (3)	Fjordager IF's Anlæg, Odense
18:00	Clausen (yellow card) 29'; Rasmussen (yellow card) 48'; Andersen 52' (Rasmussen)	DBU Report	Johansen 29' (pen.); Aasgaard 49', 67'; Nielsen (yellow card) 51'; Andreasen 56'; Vemmelund 89'	Referee: Simon Duerlund Rasmussen

7 August 2018	Nørre Aaby IK (5)	0–6	Tarup-Paarup IF (3)	Nørre Aaby Idrætspark, Nørre Aaby
18:00		DBU Report	Madsen; Søndergaard; Nøorgaard; Bendtzen	Referee: Sebastian Tornhøj Nielsen

7 August 2018	OKS (5)	2–4	BK Marienlyst (3)	OKSON-Park, Odense
18:00	Cengic 62'; Jørgensen (yellow card) 73'; Grønholt 82'	DBU Report	Raben 23', 50'; Sørensen (yellow card) 61'; Weber 85'; Hansen 88'	Referee: Paw Johansen

7 August 2018	Otterup B&IK (4)	1–3	Hedensted IF (4)	Nordfyns Bank Arena, Otterup
18:00	Hansen 75'; Chilvers (yellow card) 90'	DBU Report	Bruhn 15'; Malberg 49'; Damsbo 61'	Referee: Allan Rørdahl Borgstrøm

7 August 2018	B1913 (4)	0–1	Kolding IF (3)	Campus Road, Odense
18:00	Kjerstad (yellow card)	DBU Report	Kirkegaard (yellow card); Zederkoff (yellow card); Eriksen (yellow card)	Referee: Sandi Putros

8 August 2018	Dalum IF (3)	3–1	Odder IGF (3)	Lars R. Jacobsen Park, Odense
18:00	Schmidt 48'; Stoustrup 75', 80'; Fectehburg (yellow card) 90'	DBU Report	Nielsen 24'; Pedersen (yellow card) 70'	Referee: Jonas Bøgelund

8 August 2018	Ringe BK (6)	0–6	FC Fredericia (2)	Ringe Stadion, Ringe
18:00		DBU Report	M. Jacobsen; Johannsen; J. Jacobsen; Jensen; Own Goal	Referee: Allan Rørdahl Borgstrøm

8 August 2018	SGI/SSK (6)	2–2 (a.e.t.)	FC Sydvest 05 (3)	Guldager Idrætscentern, Esbjerg
18:00	Copsø 5' (Østergatd) 7' (pen.); Sillasen (yellow card) 62'; Riber (yellow card) 66'; Nielsen (yellow card) 90'; Cehobasic (yellow card) 101'	DBU Report	Riis 7'; Hansen 75'; Priisholm (yellow card) 90'	Referee: Jonas Rossen
	Penalties
	Copsø (penalty scored); Hansen (penalty missed); Riber (penalty missed); Cehobasic (penalty missed); Strandby (penalty missed)		Hansen (penalty missed); Ittersum (penalty missed); Lundbeck (penalty scored); Blom (penalty scored)

14 August 2018	Bramdrupdam GIF (7)	3–2 (a.e.t.)	FC BiH Odense (6)	Bramdrupdam Hallerne, Kolding
18:00	Johansen 55'; Jørgensen 65'; Lunderskov 103'; Andersen (yellow card); Thygesen (yellow card)	DBU Report	Aziz 29'; Renkli 31'; Alisaphic (yellow card) (yellow-red card); Elezovc (yellow card)	Referee: Martin Outzen

=== East ===
7 August 2018	Døllefjelde-Musse IF (5)	2–7	B1908 (4)	DMI's anlæg, Nysted
18:00	Stampe 17' (Bertelsen); Pedersen 74' (Bertelsen)	DBU Report	Pedersen 8', 90'; Bukhave 20', 50', 72', 85'; Dalgas 82'	Referee: Milad Rajabi

7 August 2018	Herlev IF (4)	5–1	Brønshøj BK (3)	Herlev Stadion, Herlev
18:00	Lip 17' (Al-Atlassi) 24'; Al-Atlassi 28' 57' (pen.); Hashiba 85'	DBU Report	Tranberg 34' (pen.); Timm (yellow card) 50'; Kisum (yellow card) 57'; Richter (yellow card) 69'	Referee: Emil Martinussen

7 August 2018	Hørsholm-Usserød IK (6)	5–0	AB Tårnby (4)	Hørsholm Idrætspark, Rungsted Kyst
18:00	Madsen 22', 62'; Umlü 40', 41'; Niazi 64'	DBU Report	Koldin (yellow card) 59'	Referee: Nicki Nordlund Hansen

7 August 2018	IF Føroyar (5)	0–6	Hillerød Fodbold (3)	Kløvermarken, Copenhagen
18:00	Olsen (yellow card) 59'; Poulsen (yellow card) 83'	DBU Report	Salamoun 21'; Harm 44'; Grandt 48'; Lindgaard 70'; Witt 75'; Karjasevic 84'	Referee: Christian Hansen

7 August 2018	Ledøje-Smørum (4)	3–1 (a.e.t.)	Stenløse BK (5)	Smørum Idrætscenter, Smørumnedre
18:00	Søberg (yellow card) 70'; Kjærsgaard (yellow card) 74'; Thomasen (yellow card) 79'; Rasmussen 80'; Jørgensen 93', 112'	DBU Report	Krøyer (yellow card) 44'; Carentius 72'; Henriksen (yellow card) 116'; E-Itr (yellow card) 118'	Referee: Philip Warburg

7 August 2018	IF Skjold Birkerød (4)	2–3 (a.e.t.)	B93 (3)	Birkerød Stadion, Birkerød
18:00	Nielsen 36', 79' (yellow card) 54'; Kokfelt (yellow card) 43'; With (yellow card) 57'; Frost-Rasmussen (yellow card) 64'; Vollesen (yellow card) 90'; Serop (yellow card) 93'; Bech (yellow card) 116'	DBU Report	Kristensen (yellow card) 22'; Jørgensen (yellow card) 36'; Nørgaard 60' (yellow card) 77'; Roshani 87' (yellow card) 99'; Olsen (yellow card) 90'; Hegaard (yellow card) 95'; Thomsen 119'	Referee: Yasin Seker

7 August 2018	Vordingborg (6)	2–3	Tårnby FF (5)	Vordingborg Stadion, Vordingborg
18:00	Bredskov 15'; Bruun 30'; Beck (yellow card) 79'	DBU Report	Knudsen 15' (Ziebrandtsen) 15' (pen.); Hjulmand (yellow card) 30'; Petersen 30' (Keller) (yellow card) 72'; Hansen (yellow card) 55'; Willman (yellow card) 56'	Referee: Dan Pedersen

7 August 2018	CBS Sport (6)	1–5	GVI (4)	Kunst, Jens Jessens Vej, Frederiksberg
18:45	Østergaard 13'; Spasojevic (yellow card) 67'	DBU Report	Østgaard (yellow card) 15' (goal) 32', 87'; Raahave 48'; Skou 58'; Ehlers (yellow card) 66'; Mayasi 81'	Referee: Christian Lundquist Iversen

8 August 2018	FC Nakskov (5)	1–3	BK Avarta (4)	OK+ Stadion, Nakskov
18:00	Petersen 27' (pen.); Johansen (yellow card) 65'	DBU Report	Albrechtsen 13' (Zimling) 71'; Christiansen 79'	Referee: Christian Hansen

8 August 2018	BK Fremad Valby (4)	2–6 (a.e.t.)	AB (3)	Valby Idrætspark, Valby
18:00	Padi (yellow card) 26'; Amby (yellow card) 35'; Jensen 46'; Andersen (yellow card) 63' (yellow-red card) 87'; Balslve 79'	DBU Report	Tangvig 21', 96'; Rohde 68'; Aslani (yellow card) 81'; Noer (yellow card) 91'; Seeger-Hansen 93'; Pedersen 99', 119'	Referee: Simon Rosenlund

8 August 2018	Greve (4)	0–4	FC Roskilde (2)	Greve Idrætspark, Greve
18:00	Wæde (yellow card) 22'; Butt (yellow card) 30'	DBU Report	Larsen 20' (Thygesen); Nielsen (yellow card) 30' (goal) 44' 69' (pen.); Julø 88'	Referee: Jesper Nielsen

8 August 2018	Holbæk B&I (4)	0–2	HIK (3)	SuRi Park, Holbæk
18:00	Adamsen (yellow card) 72'	DBU Report	Ravn-Haren 11'; Børner (yellow card) 57'; Riis (yellow card) 62'; Rasmussen 90+1'	Referee: Mostafa Seyfi

8 August 2018	Humlebæk BK (7)	1–4	HB Køge (2)	Humlebæk Stadion, Humlebæk
18:00	Zidi 72'; Heegaard (yellow card) 80'	DBU Report	Johansson 12'; Olsen 37' (pen.); Haüser 49' (yellow card) 65'; Opoku 66'	Referee: Kasper Madsen

8 August 2018	Karlslunde IF (5)	0–3	Næstved BK (2)	Karslunde Stadion, Karslunde
18:00	Nielsen (yellow card) 36'; Ashar (yellow card) 49'; Moestrup (yellow card) 57'	DBU Report	Ahmed 39'; Andersen 76'; Boateng 87'	Referee: Jonas Hansen

8 August 2018	Nykøbing FC (2)	1–0 (a.e.t.)	Lyngby BK (2)	CM Arena, Nykøbing Falster
18:00	Jensen (yellow card) 88' (goal) 111'; Wagner (yellow card) 118'	DBU Report	Christjansen (yellow card) 61'; Corlu (yellow card) 118'	Referee: Patrick Stenzel Rasmussen

8 August 2018	Skovshoved IF (3)	1–4	BK Frem (3)	Skovshoved Idrætspark, Klampenborg
18:00	Nanji 50'; Petersen (yellow card) 67'	DBU Report	Dirksen (yellow card) 43'; Camili 45'; Severinsen (yellow card) 63'; Sundstrup 72'; Njai (yellow card) 80'; Horsebøg 82'; Adamsen 85'	Referee: Sebastian Friis Aagerup

8 August 2018	Slagelse B&I (3)	0–2	FC Helsingør (2)	Slagelse Stadion, Slagelse
18:00	Klausen (yellow card) 51'; Christensen (yellow card) 69' (yellow-red card) 90+2'; Thrane (yellow card) 69'	DBU Report	Lange 15'; Roepstorff 30'	Referee: Benjamin Helm Svedborg

14 August 2018	Frem Bjæverskov (7)	0–0 (a.e.t.)	Listrup U&IF (6)	Bjæverskov Stadion, Bjæverskov
18:00	Belling (yellow card) 70'	DBU Report	Bergmann (yellow card) 15'; Krasniqi (yellow card) 70'	Referee: Anders Foght
	Penalties
	Broed (penalty scored); Nielsen (penalty scored); Hald (penalty scored); Samuelsen (penalty scored)		Damgaard (penalty scored); Christensen (penalty scored); Vloran Krasniqi (penalty missed); Veprim Krasniqi (penalty missed)

14 August 2018	FC Rudersdal (7)	0–4	NB Bornholm (5)	Vedbæk Stadion, Vedbæk
18:00	Kjær (yellow card) 76'; Clem (yellow card) 77'	DBU Report	Vardar 5' (Stukonis); Andersen (yellow card) 9' (goal) 20'; Conradsen (yellow card) 44'; Stukonis (yellow card) 73'; Mlynarski 83'; Conradsen 90' (pen.)	Referee: Niclas Gomes

15 August 2018	Hundested IK (6)	2–2 (a.e.t.)	Union (4)	Hundestedhallen, Hundested
18:00	Olsen 39'; Prior (yellow card) 42'; Jægergaard 72'; Rimmer (yellow card) 87'; (yellow card) 119'	DBU Report	Holmstrøm 12' (yellow card) 88'; Fernando 21'; Lucht (yellow card) 81'; Skamby (yellow card) 83'
	Penalties
	Wedell-Riis (penalty scored); Larsen (penalty scored); Bonde (penalty scored); Rasmussen (penalty scored)		Fernando (penalty scored)

15 August 2018	Hvidovre IF (2)	1–4	Fremad Amager (2)	Kæmpernes Arena, Hvidovre, Copenhagen
18:30	Qamili (yellow card) 9'; Aabech 70'	DBU Report	Stanic (yellow card) 25'; Sharza 32', 34', 80'; Lysenko (yellow card) 42'; Iyede 46'	Referee: Jonas Hansen

== Second round ==
4 September 2018	Hedensted IF (4)	1–2	Aarhus Fremad (3)	Hedensted Stadion, Hedensted
17:15	Bruhn 11'	DBU Report	Ullum 63', 75'; Habibi (yellow card) 84'	Referee: Mads-Kristoffer Kristoffersen

4 September 2018	Silkeborg KFUM (4)	0–3	Kolding IF (3)	Søholt Idrætspark, Silkeborg
17:15	Damgaard (yellow card) 32'; Christiansen (yellow card) 81'	DBU Report	Andersen 34' (Jensen); Bruun (yellow card) 55'; Schultz 72' (Nielsen); Brodersen 76'	Referee: Rasmus Nielsen

4 September 2018	Viby IF (4)	2–1	Skive IK (3)	Viby Idrætspark, Viby
17:15	Lauridsen 10'; Møller (yellow card) 19'; Matras 43'; Lauridsen (yellow card) 74'	DBU Report	Jensen 24'; Henriksen (yellow card) 65'; Laursen (yellow card) 73'; Jespersen (yellow card) 74'	Referee: Henrik Overgaard

4 September 2018	B1908 (4)	2–1	BK Avarta (3)	Sundby I P. Opvisn., Copenhagen
17:15	Mustafi (yellow card) 56'; Bukhave 70'; Pedersen 84'; Fey (yellow card) 90'	DBU Report	Zimling (yellow card) 22' (yellow-red card) 80'; Ustrup (yellow card) 36'; Hemmingshøj 57'	Referee: Frida Mia Klarlund Nielsen

4 September 2018	Herlev IF (4)	2–2 (a.e.t.) (2–4 p)	BK Marienlyst (3)	Herlev Stadion, Herlev
17:15	Lip 20', 45' (yellow card) 104'; Pedersen (yellow card) 53'	DBU Report	Mikkelsen 35'; Hansen (yellow card) 37'; Raben 78'; Jensen (yellow card) 80'	Referee: Mostafa Seyfi
	Penalties
	Lip (penalty missed); Al-Atlassi (penalty scored); Damgaard (penalty missed); Mustafi (penalty scored)		Jörgensen (penalty scored); Raben (penalty scored); Weber (penalty scored); Riis (penalty scored)

4 September 2018	GVI (4)	0–3	SønderjyskE (1)	GVI. Nymosen, Gentofte
17:15	Raavave (yellow card) 37'; Husani (yellow card) 51'	DBU Report	Hvilsom 23', 27', 56'	Referee: Peter Munch Larsen

4 September 2018	FC Djursland (4)	1–3	Jammerbugt FC (3)	HSM Arena Grenå, Grenå
17:30	Cramer (yellow card) 65'; Kaagh 77'; Smidt (yellow card) 90+3'	DBU Report	Møller 5', 90+2' (yellow card) 30'; Lyngø 10'	Referee: Aydin Uslu

4 September 2018	Bramdrupdam GIF (7)	0–11	Dalum IF (3)	Bramdrupdam Kunstgræsbane, Kolding
19:00	Vestergaard (yellow card) 42'; Thygesen (yellow card) 43'; Andersen (yellow card) 64'	DBU Report	Lodahl 30'; Fechtenburg 60', 78'; Humlegaard 70'; Stoustrup 73', 84', 90'; Schmidt 82', 87', 89'; Høgstad 84'	Referee: Allan Staal

5 September 2018	NB Bornholm (5)	0–2	Hillerød Fodbold (3)	Nexø Stadion, Nexø
17:00	Espersen (yellow card) 8'; Exsteen (yellow card) 83'	DBU Report	Grandt (yellow card) 17' (goal) 50'; Witt 61'; Masamuna (yellow card) 71'; Rasmussen (yellow card) 73'	Referee: Emil Martinussen

5 September 2018	Fremad Amager (2)	2–5	FC Roskilde (2)	Sundby I P. Opvisn, Sundby
17:15	Ohlander (yellow card) 25'; Engel 67'; Larsen (yellow card) 72'; Sharza 78'; Iyede (yellow card) 83'; Bay (yellow card) 88'	DBU Report	Nielsen 1', 17', 90'; Jessen 41', 62'; Thygesen (yellow card) 81'	Referee: Jakob A. Sundberg

5 September 2018	Hørsholm-Usserød IK (6)	1–11	Esbjerg fB (1)	Hørsholm Idrætspark, Hørsholm
17:15	Madsen 89'; Larsen (yellow card) 90'	DBU Report	McGrath 4', 69'; Yakovenko 8', 19', 37', 55'; Bækgård 18', 59', 66'; Kristensen 56'; Rejnhold 84'; Parunashvili (yellow card) 90'	Referee: Anders Poulsen

5 September 2018	Egen UI (6)	1–9	Vendsyssel FF (1)	Guderup-Hallen - Inde, Nordborg
17:15	Zongwe 11' (pen.); Heesch (yellow card) 37'	DBU Report	Ogude 7', 9', 31', 36', 57'; Brandão 34', 42'; Gouriye 64'; Illum 79'	Referee: Mads-Kristoffer Kristoffersen

5 September 2018	IF Lyseng (4)	1–2 (a.e.t.)	Hobro IK (1)	Lyseng Idrætspark, Højbjerg
17:15	Rieper 16'; Stokvad (yellow card); Nørbygaard (yellow card); Andersen (yellow card)	DBU Report	Grønning 53'; Skjellerup 114'; Brix-Damborg (yellow card)	Referee: Mikkel Redder

5 September 2018	Kjellerup IF (3)	0–1	Middelfart G&BK (3)	Bjergets Idrætsanlæg, Kjellerup
17:15	Pietras (yellow card) 25'; Vestergaard (yellow card) 52'; Nielsen (yellow card) 73'; Jensen (yellow card) 83'	DBU Report	Dalgaard 76'	Referee: Henrik Hansen

5 September 2018	Brabrand IF (3)	2–3	Silkeborg IF (2)	Brabrand IF's Idrætsanlæg, Brabrand
17:15	Brinck (yellow card) 59'; Boesen 69'; Poulsen 90+4'	DBU Report	Schwartz 52' (yellow card) 81'; Mattsson 55'; Okkels 90'	Referee: Chris Johansen

5 September 2018	FC Sydvest 05 (3)	0–2	AGF Aarhus (1)	BankParken Tønder, Tønder
17:30		DBU Report	Sverrisson (yellow card) 56'; Spelmann 62'; Sana 89'	Attendance: 1,100; Referee: Sandi Putros

5 September 2018	FC Helsingør (2)	1–1 (a.e.t.) (4–5 p)	Næstved BK (2)	Helsingør Stadion, Helsingør
19:00	Holst 18'; Olsen (yellow card) 34'; Basse (yellow card) 76'; Jørgensen (yellow card) 88' (yellow-red card) 107'	DBU Report	Mertz 70'; Dhaflaoui (yellow card) 88'; Therkildsen (yellow card) 98'	Referee: Jesper Nielsen
	Penalties
	Holm (penalty scored); Mortensen (penalty missed); Basse (penalty scored); Gregor (penalty scored); Olsen (penalty scored)		Boateng (penalty scored); Mertz (penalty scored); Munksgaard (penalty scored); Therkildsen (penalty scored); Hansen (penalty scored)

5 September 2018	B93 (3)	1–3	HB Køge (2)	Østerbro Stadion, Copenhagen
19:30	Rajovic 65'; Hegaard (yellow card); McKay (yellow card)	DBU Report	Johansson 10', 21'; Christensen 57'	Attendance: 294; Referee: Jonas Hansen

6 September 2018	AB (3)	0–4	OB (1)	Gladsaxe Stadion, Gladsaxe
19:30		DBU Report	Kadrii 21'; Laursen 27'; Helenius 39', 61'; Dieudonne (yellow card) 66'	Attendance: 1,210; Referee: Peter Kjærsgaard

11 September 2018	Hundested IK (6)	4–1	Tårnby FF (5)	Hundestedhallen, Hundested
17:00	Bonde 4', 87' (Jægergaard); Olsen 37' (Prior); Rasmussen 61' (Bonde) (yellow card) 79'; Berthold (yellow card) 86'	DBU Report	Ziebrandtsen 19' (Nielsen); Robrahn (yellow card) 84'	Referee: Mostafa Seyfi

11 September 2018	Næsby BK (4)	1–1 (a.e.t.) (2–4 p)	Randers FC (1)	ALPI Arena Næsby, Odense
17:00	Lund 60'; Nielsen (yellow card); Weber (yellow card)	DBU Report	Aaquist 15' (pen.) (yellow card); Enghardt (yellow card); Kallesøe (yellow card)	Attendance: 651; Referee: Jørgen Daugbjerg Burchardt
	Penalties
	Weber (penalty scored); Hansen (penalty scored); Berthelsen (penalty missed); Dalager (penalty missed)		Jakobsen (penalty scored); Allansson (penalty scored); Stokke (penalty scored); Rømer (penalty scored)

11 September 2018	Frem Bjæverskov (7)	0–3	Ledøje-Smørum (4)	Borup Stadion, kunstgræs, Borup
19:00	Salomonsson (yellow card) 67'; Broed (yellow card) 75'	DBU Report	Lindbaum 56'; Jørgensen 64'; Kjærsgaard 76' (pen.)	Referee: Mads-Kristoffer Kristoffersen

11 September 2018	BK Frem (3)	3–4 (a.e.t.)	Vejle BK (1)	Valby IP. Stadion, Copenhagen
19:30	Adamsen 5'; Christiansson (yellow card) 76'; Warlo 79', 114'	DBU Report	Jakobsen 24', 87'; Schoop 103'; Hallberg (yellow card) 103'; Sousa (yellow card) 111'; From 116'	Referee: Benjamin Willaume-Jantzen

12 September 2018	Tarup-Paarup IF (3)	0–1 (a.e.t.)	Thisted FC (2)	Home Tarup Park, Odense
17:15		DBU Report	Myrthue (yellow card) 18'; Hedegaard 61'	Referee: Benjamin Helm Svedborg

12 September 2018	HIK (3)	1–2 (a.e.t.)	Nykøbing FC (2)	Gentofte Sportspark Opv. kunst, Gentofte
18:30	Rasmussen (yellow card) 51'; Erbas (yellow card) 76'; Johansson 81' (yellow card) 120'; Wichmann (yellow card) 119'	DBU Report	Wilson (yellow card) 35'; Schøndorf 40'; Thorsheim 105'; Gehrt (yellow card) 120'	Referee: Kasper Madsen

12 September 2018	Viborg FF (2)	2–2 (a.e.t.) (4–5 p)	FC Fredericia (2)	Energi Viborg Arena, Viborg
19:00	Beck 58'; Albers 106'; Bonde (yellow card); Scheel (yellow card); Grønning (yellow card)	DBU Report	Jacobsen 39'; Sørensen 99'; Nybo (yellow card); Uzochokwu (yellow card) (yellow-red card); Letort (yellow card)	Attendance: 1,532; Referee: Mikkel Redder
	Penalties
	Albers (penalty scored); Scheel (penalty scored); Bonde (penalty scored); Park (penalty scored); Dehn (penalty missed)		Torp (penalty scored); Holvad (penalty scored); Sørensen (penalty scored); Eriksen (penalty scored); Ege (penalty scored)

== Third round ==
25 September 2018	Ledøje-Smørum (4)	1–2	Hobro IK (1)	Smørum Idrætscenter, Smørum
16:30	Gransee 17'; Jørgensen (yellow card) 79'; Lindbaum (yellow card) 81'	DBU Report	Hammershøy-Mistrati 58', 70'; Putros (yellow card) 88'	Referee: Benjamin Willaume-Jantzen

25 September 2018	Kolding IF (3)	2–1 (a.e.t.)	Randers FC (1)	Autocentralen Park, Kolding
19:00	Fazlagic (red card) 30'; Høgsholt (yellow card) 52'; Zachariassen (yellow card) 83'; Brodersen 87'; Kirkegaard (yellow card) 99'; Nautrup 106'; Smidt (yellow card) 117'	DBU Report	Jakobsen 6'; Aaquist (yellow card) 21'	Referee: Sandi Putros

26 September 2018	Hundested IK (6)	0–3	Vendsyssel FF (1)	Hundestedhallen, Hundested
16:15		DBU Report	Adekoya 73', 75'; Ogude 76'	Referee: Anders Poulsen

26 September 2018	Jammerbugt FC (3)	0–1	Esbjerg fB (1)	Sparekassen Vendsyssel Arena, Pandrup
16:30	Nielsen (yellow card) 88'; Larsen (yellow card) 88'	DBU Report	Petre 49'; Agus (yellow card) 90+2'; Kristensen (yellow card) 90+3'; Parunashvili (yellow card)	Referee: Morten Krogh

26 September 2018	B1908 (4)	2–4 (a.e.t.)	BK Marienlyst (3)	Sundby Idrætspark, Copenhagen
16:30	Kyster 2' 65' (pen.); Fey (yellow card) 31'; Bukhave (red card) 92'	DBU Report	Weber 37'; Jørgensen 41'; Hvilsom 105'; Haages 118'	Referee: Jakob A. Sundberg

26 September 2018	Dalum IF (3)	1–2 (a.e.t.)	FC Midtjylland (1)	Lars R. Jacobsen Park, Odense
16:30	Stoustrup; Andersen (yellow card)	DBU Report	Evander (yellow card) 38' (goal) 49'; Onuachu 96'; Wikheim (yellow card) 105'	Attendance: 1,175; Referee: Mads-Kristoffer Kristoffersen

26 September 2018	Næstved BK (2)	1–0	Silkeborg IF (2)	ProfaGroupPark, Næstved
18:00	Andersen (yellow card) 25'; Christensen 42' (pen.); Saric (yellow card) 65'; Petersen (yellow card) 88'	DBU Report	Vendelbo (yellow card) 83'; Schwartz (yellow card) 90+1'	Referee: Jesper Nielsen

26 September 2018	Aarhus Fremad (3)	1–5	AGF Aarhus (1)	ProfaGroupPark, Næstved
18:30	Damgaard (yellow card); Bech (yellow card); Høgh	DBU Report	Amini 41', 64'; Kaastrup 71'; Mmaee 80', 87'	Attendance: 2,103; Referee: Jørgen Daugbjerg Burchardt

26 September 2018	FC Roskilde (2)	0–5	AaB (1)	Roskilde Idrætspark, Roskilde
18:30	Hermansen (yellow card) 24'; Kisum (yellow card) 78'; Qvist (yellow card) 89'	DBU Report	Abou Ali 8', 88' (yellow card) 81'; McLagan 15' (o.g.); Risgård 57', 70'	Attendance: 992; Referee: Peter Kjærsgaard

26 September 2018	HB Køge (2)	0–4	FC Nordsjælland (1)	Capelli Sport Stadion, Herfølge
19:00	Overby (yellow card) 55'; Johansson (yellow card) 58'	DBU Report	Skovgaard 45' (yellow card) 63'; Amon 53'; Olsen 56' (pen.); Jensen 68' (pen.)	Referee: Benjamin Willaume-Jantzen

26 September 2018	FC Fredericia (2)	0–2	SønderjyskE (1)	Monjasa Park, Fredericia
19:00	Baidoo (yellow card) 38'; James (yellow card) 58'	DBU Report	Hvilsom 23'; Ekani (yellow card) 41'; Pedersen (yellow card) 43'; Bah 55'; Gartenmann	Referee: Mikkel Redder

27 September 2018	Viby IF (4)	0–3	F.C. Copenhagen (1)	Viby Idrætspark, Viby
16:45		DBU Report	Sotiriou 28' (pen.) 73' (Holse); Daramy 89' (Holse)	Referee: Jakob Kehlet

27 September 2018	Hillerød (3)	1–4	Brøndby IF (1)	Hillerød Stadion, Hillerød
19:30	Andersen 12'	DBU Report	Uhre 45'; Fisker 58'; Halimi 74'; Erceg 87'	Referee: Michael Johansen

3 October 2018	Middelfart G&BK (3)	0–3	AC Horsens (1)	Middelfart Stadium, Middelfart
16:15		DBU Report	Avanzini (yellow card) 19'; Kryger 35' (yellow card) 70' (goal) 83' (pen.); Andersen 42'; Kortegaard (yellow card) 50'; Madsen (yellow card) 76'; Mortensen (yellow card) 86'	Referee: Mads-Kristoffer Kristoffersen

3 October 2018	Thisted FC (2)	0–2	OB (1)	Sparekassen Thy Arena, Thisted
18:30		DBU Report	Jacobsen 52'; Jørgensen 61'	Attendance: 649; Referee: Michael Tykgaard

10 October 2018	Nykøbing FC (2)	1–2	Vejle BK (1)	CM Arena, Nykøbing Falster
18:00	Kaalund (yellow card) 8'; Holten 65'	DBU Report	Nilsson 24', 45'; Oduwa (yellow card) 72'; Louati (yellow card) 77'	Referee: Jakob A. Sundberg

== Fourth round ==
31 October 2018	Næstved (2)	2–1	AGF (1)	ProfaGroupPark, Næstved
18:15	Jensen 11'; Therkildsen (yellow card) 39'; Boateng 55'; Norouzi (yellow card) 73'	DBU Report	Mmaee 7'; Guira (yellow card) 46'; Amini (yellow card) 68'; Stage (yellow card) 80'	Referee: Benjamin Willaume-Jantzen

31 October 2018	AaB (1)	1–0	Horsens (1)	Aalborg Portland Park, Aalborg
19:00	van Weert (yellow card) 9' (goal) 62'	DBU Report		Referee: Peter Kjærsgaard

31 October 2018	Kolding (3)	3–1 (a.e.t.)	Vejle (1)	Autocentralen Park, Kolding
19:00	Hansen 45'; Sørensen (yellow card) 90'; Nielsen (yellow card) 102'; Zachariassen 105'; Kirkegaard 115'	DBU Report	Sousa 1' (yellow card) 28' (yellow-red card) 102'; Mucolli (yellow card) 30'; Emmersón (yellow card) 73'; Davidsen (yellow card) 118'	Referee: Morten Krogh

1 November 2018	Midtjylland (1)	2–0	Copenhagen (1)	MCH Arena, Herning
19:30	Sviatchenko 5'; Onuachu (yellow card) 51'; Wikheim 62'; Dal Hende (yellow card) 90'	DBU Report	Skov (yellow card) 90'	Attendance: 7,366; Referee: Jakob Kehlet

6 November 2018	Hobro (1)	2–4	OB (1)	DS Arena, Hobro
17:30	Grønning 47'; Kirkevold 54'	DBU Report	Nielsen 12', 48' (yellow card) 82'; Thomasen 51'; Jacobsen 73'	Attendance: 1,017; Referee: Jens Maae

7 November 2018	SønderjyskE (1)	1–2 (a.e.t.)	Esbjerg (1)	Sydbank Park, Haderslev
19:00	Luijckx 57' (yellow card) 112' (yellow-red card) 112'; Pedersen (yellow card) 90'	DBU Report	Petre 65'; Agus 99'; Brink (yellow card) 115'; Møller (yellow card) 120+3'	Attendance: 3,314; Referee: Michael Tykgaard

22 November 2018	Marienlyst (3)	1–4	Brøndby (1)	Nature Energy Park, Odense
19:00	Jørgensen 36' (yellow card) 65'; Christensen (yellow card) 55'; Kuruçay (yellow card) 62'	DBU Report	Halimi 5'; Uhre 11'; Laursen 18'; Frendrup 32' (yellow card) 32'	Attendance: 2,222; Referee: Mads-Kristoffer Kristoffersen

5 December 2018	Nordsjælland (1)	0–1	Vendsyssel (1)	Right to Dream Park, Farum
19:00	Kudus (yellow card) 37'; Nelsson (yellow card) 87'	DBU Report	Høvenhoff (yellow card) 39'; Gouriye 43'; Illum (yellow card) 54'	Attendance: 1,102; Referee: Anders Poulsen

=== Bracket ===
Quarter-finals
27 February – Odense
OB (p)	2 (3)
Esbjerg fB	2 (2)
28 February – Hjørring
Vendsyssel FF	0
Brøndby IF	2
13 March – Kolding
Kolding IF	0
FC Midtjylland	2
14 March – Næstved
Næstved BK	1
AaB	3

Semi-finals
3 April – Herning
FC Midtjylland	4
OB	0
4 April – Brøndby
Brøndby IF	1
AaB	0

Final
17 May – Copenhagen
FC Midtjylland (p)	1 (4)
Brøndby IF	1 (3)

== Quarter-finals ==
27 February 2019	OB (1)	2–2 (a.e.t.) (3–2 p)	Esbjerg (1)	Nature Energy Park, Odense
19:00	Jacobsen 66'; Helenius 108'	OB Report	Petre 14'; Kauko 103'	Attendance: 4,310; Referee: Jakob Kehlet
	Penalties
	Thomasen (penalty missed); Jacobsen (penalty scored); Helenius (penalty missed); Nielsen (penalty scored); Kløve (penalty scored)		Kauko (penalty scored); Parunashvili (penalty missed); Anyembe (penalty scored); Yakovenko (penalty missed); Lauridsen (penalty missed)

28 February 2019	Vendsyssel (1)	0–2	Brøndby (1)	Nord Energi Arena, Vendsyssel
19:00	Jensen (yellow card) 53'; Roerslev (yellow card) 55'	Brøndby IF Report	Mensah 29' (yellow card) 58'; Radošević (yellow card) 78'; Arajuuri (yellow card) 81'; Wilczek 90+1'	Attendance: 2,335; Referee: Michael Tykgaard

13 March 2019	Kolding (3)	0–2	Midtjylland (1)	Autocentralen Park, Kolding
18:00	Smidt (yellow card) 47'; Nielsen (yellow card) 90'	FCM Report	Wikheim 22'; George 46'; Mabil (yellow card) 53'; Kraev (yellow card) 90+2'	Attendance: 6,050; Referee: Peter Kjærsgaard-Andersen

14 March 2019	Næstved (2)	1–3	AaB (1)	ProfaGroup Park, Næstved
18:00	Kongstedt (yellow card) 33'; Munksgaard 40' (Hassan)	AaB Highlights	van Weert 7' (Kusk) 19' (Thellufsen) (yellow card) 62'; Christensen 52'	Attendance: 2,214; Referee: Mads Kristoffer-Kristoffersen

== Semi-finals ==
3 April 2019	Midtjylland (1)	4–0	OB (1)	MCH Arena, Herning
19:30	Kløve 31' (o.g.); Onuachu 47', 72'; Wikheim 87'	FCM Summary	O. Lund (yellow card) 29'	Attendance: 7,549; Referee: Michael Johansen

4 April 2019	Brøndby (1)	1–0	AaB (1)	Brøndby Stadium, Brøndby
19:30	Wilczek 13'; Gammelby (yellow card) 61'; Erceg (yellow card) 90+1' (yellow-red card) 90+3'; Arajuuri (yellow card) 90+2'	Brøndby Report	Børsting (yellow card) 60' van Weert (yellow card) 90+2'	Attendance: 13,361; Referee: Jens Maae

== Final ==
17 May 2019
20:00

FC Midtjylland (1)	1–1 (a.e.t.)	Brøndby IF (1)
K. Hansen 6'	Report	Kaiser 21'
Penalties
Poulsen (penalty scored); Thychosen (penalty missed); Dal Hende (penalty scored); Mabil (penalty scored); Scholz (penalty scored)	4–3	(penalty missed) Kaiser; (penalty scored) Jung; (penalty scored) Wilczek; (penalty missed) Radošević; (penalty scored) Halimi

Parken Stadium, Copenhagen
Attendance: 31,340
Referee: Peter Kjærsgaard-Andersen
