= List of Danish football transfers summer 2018 =

This is a list of Danish football transfers for the 2018 summer transfer window. Only transfers featuring Danish Superliga are listed.

== Danish Superliga ==
Note: Flags indicate national team as has been defined under FIFA eligibility rules. Players may hold more than one non-FIFA nationality.

=== Aalborg ===
In:

No.	Pos.	Nation	Player

Out:

No.	Pos.	Nation	Player
10	MF	PER	Edison Flores (to (Mexico) Morelia)

=== Aarhus ===
In:

No.	Pos.	Nation	Player
—	GK	ESP	Óscar Whalley (from (Spain) Sporting Gijón)

Out:

No.	Pos.	Nation	Player
4	MF	DEN	Daniel A. Pedersen (to (Norway) Lillestrøm)
5	DF	DEN	Alexander Juel Andersen (to Vendsyssel)

=== Brøndby ===
In:

No.	Pos.	Nation	Player
1	GK	GER	Marvin Schwäbe (from (Germany) 1899 Hoffenheim, previously on loan at (Germany) Dynamo Dresden)
2	DF	DEN	Jens Martin Gammelby (from Silkeborg)
3	DF	GER	Anthony Jung (from (Germany) RB Leipzig, previously on loan)
7	MF	GER	Dominik Kaiser (from (Germany) RB Leipzig)
11	FW	DEN	Mikael Uhre (from SønderjyskE)
15	DF	GER	Björn Kopplin (from Hobro)
18	FW	DEN	Nikolai Laursen (on loan from (Netherlands) Jong PSV)
22	MF	CRO	Josip Radošević (from (Croatia) Hajduk Split)
32	MF	DEN	Morten Frendrup (from Brøndby U19)
50	FW	CRO	Ante Erceg (from (United Arab Emirates) Shabab Al-Ahli)

Out:

No.	Pos.	Nation	Player
1	GK	DEN	Frederik Rønnow (to (Germany) Eintracht Frankfurt)
9	FW	FIN	Teemu Pukki (to (England) Norwich City)
19	MF	DEN	Christian Nørgaard (to (Italy) Fiorentina)
22	FW	SWE	Gustaf Nilsson (to Vejle)
27	DF	DEN	Svenn Crone (to Silkeborg)
28	DF	DEN	Christian Enemark (on loan to Køge)
30	GK	DEN	Viktor Anker (released)

=== Copenhagen ===
In:

No.	Pos.	Nation	Player
4	DF	SWE	Sotirios Papagiannopoulos (from (Sweden) Östersund)
5	DF	DEN	Andreas Bjelland (from (England) Brentford)
11	FW	BIH	Kenan Kodro (from (Germany) 1. FSV Mainz 05, previously on loan at (Switzerland) Grasshopper)
14	FW	SEN	Dame N'Doye (from (Turkey) Trabzonspor)
21	GK	FIN	Jesse Joronen (from Horsens)

Out:

No.	Pos.	Nation	Player
1	GK	SWE	Robin Olsen (to (Italy) Roma)
5	DF	SWE	Erik Johansson (to (Sweden) Djurgården)
8	MF	SRB	Uroš Matić (on loan to Austria Wien)
9	FW	PAR	Federico Santander (to (Italy) Bologna)
11	FW	SRB	Andrija Pavlović (to (Austria) Rapid Wien)
35	MF	CIV	Aboubakar Keita (on loan to (Norway) Stabæk)

=== Esbjerg ===
In:

No.	Pos.	Nation	Player
5	MF	FIN	Markus Halsti (from Midtjylland)
10	MF	NED	Rafael van der Vaart (from Midtjylland)
—	MF	DEN	Mads Larsen (from Esbjerg U19)
—	MF	DEN	Simon Bækgaard (from Esbjerg U19)

Out:

No.	Pos.	Nation	Player

=== Hobro ===
In:

No.	Pos.	Nation	Player
—	DF	DEN	Alexander Molberg (from OB U19, previously on loan at (Italy) Cagliari U19)
—	FW	NOR	Julian Kristoffersen (from (Sweden) Djurgården)

Out:

No.	Pos.	Nation	Player
15	DF	GER	Björn Kopplin (to Brøndby)

=== Horsens ===
In:

No.	Pos.	Nation	Player
1	GK	CRO	Matej Delač (from (England) Chelsea)
2	MF	DEN	Sammy Skytte (on loan from Midtjylland)
4	DF	DEN	Søren Reese (on loan from Midtjylland)
6	MF	NOR	Sivert Heltne Nilsen (from (Norway) Brann)
23	MF	DEN	Frederik Mortensen (from Viborg)
24	DF	FRO	Sonni Nattestad (on loan from (Norway) Molde)
30	GK	DEN	Kevin Ray Mendoza (from Thisted)

Out:

No.	Pos.	Nation	Player
1	GK	FIN	Jesse Joronen (to Copenhagen)
4	MF	DEN	Simon Okosun (to Midtjylland)
9	FW	ISL	Kjartan Finnbogason (to (Hungary) Ferencvárosi)
18	MF	DEN	Jeppe Mehl (to Thisted)
27	MF	DEN	Jonas Thorsen (to (Germany) Eintracht Braunschweig)
30	GK	DEN	Marcus Bobjerg (to Skive)
33	DF	DEN	Alexander Ludwig (to OB)

=== Midtjylland ===
In:

No.	Pos.	Nation	Player
8	MF	DEN	Simon Okosun (from Horsens)
14	DF	DEN	Alexander Scholz (from (Belgium) Club Brugge)
19	FW	CRC	Mayron George (from Randers, previously on loan at Lyngby)
28	DF	DEN	Erik Sviatchenko (from (Scotland) Celtic, previously on loan)
—	MF	GER	Dominick Drexler (from (Germany) Holstein Kiel)
—	DF	CAN	Manjrekar James (from (Hungary) Vasas)
—	MF	DEN	Sammy Skytte (from Silkeborg)
—	DF	DEN	Søren Reese (from Viborg)

Out:

No.	Pos.	Nation	Player
6	MF	FIN	Markus Halsti (to Esbjerg)
8	MF	NED	Rafael van der Vaart (to Esbjerg)
40	DF	DEN	Andreas Poulsen (to (Germany) Borussia Mönchengladbach)
—	DF	CAN	Manjrekar James (on loan to Fredericia)
—	DF	DEN	Søren Reese (on loan to Horsens)
–	MF	GER	Dominick Drexler (to (Germany) 1. FC Köln)
—	MF	DEN	Sammy Skytte (on loan to Horsens)
–	FW	ISL	Mikael Anderson (on loan to (Netherlands) Excelsior)

=== Nordsjælland ===
In:

No.	Pos.	Nation	Player
1	GK	NED	Nigel Bertrams (from (Netherlands) NAC Breda)

Out:

No.	Pos.	Nation	Player
1	GK	ISL	Rúnar Alex Rúnarsson (to (France) Dijon)
6	MF	DEN	Lasse Petry (released)
9	FW	DEN	Tobias Mikkelsen (to (Australia) Brisbane Roar)
23	MF	DEN	Mathias Jensen (to (Spain) Celta Vigo)

=== OB ===
In:

No.	Pos.	Nation	Player
3	DF	DEN	Alexander Ludwig (from Horsens)
17	MF	DEN	Jonathan Harboe (from OB U19)
25	FW	DEN	Mathias Jørgensen (from OB U19)
30	GK	CIV	Sayouba Mandé (from (Norway) Stabæk)

Out:

No.	Pos.	Nation	Player
7	FW	FRO	Jóan Símun Edmundsson (to (Germany) Arminia Bielefeld)

=== Randers ===
In:

No.	Pos.	Nation	Player
9	FW	DEN	Emil Riis Jakobsen (from (England) Derby County U23, previously on loan at (Netherlands) VVV)
18	FW	NOR	Benjamin Stokke (from (Norway) Kristiansund)
27	DF	DEN	Tobias Damsgaard (from Randers U19)
28	DF	DEN	Simon Graves Jensen (from Randers U19)

Out:

No.	Pos.	Nation	Player
1	GK	ISL	Hannes Þór Halldórsson (to (Azerbaijan) Qarabağ)
6	MF	FIN	Joni Kauko (released)
—	FW	CRC	Mayron George (to Midtjylland, previously on loan at Lyngby)

=== SønderjyskE ===
In:

No.	Pos.	Nation	Player
—	FW	NED	Mart Lieder (from (Netherlands) Eindhoven)
—	FW	DEN	Johan Absalonsen (from (Australia) Adelaide United)
—	GK	DEN	Victor Smedsrud (from SønderjyskE U19)

Out:

No.	Pos.	Nation	Player
10	MF	DEN	Emil Scheel (to Viborg)
14	DF	DEN	Mikkel Hedegaard (retired)
17	FW	DEN	Mikael Uhre (to Brøndby)

=== Vejle ===
In:

No.	Pos.	Nation	Player
2	DF	ISL	Felix Örn Friðriksson (on loan from (Iceland) ÍBV)
8	MF	SWE	Melker Hallberg (from (Italy) Udinese)
9	MF	DEN	Tobias Mølgaard (from Thisted)
10	MF	IRL	Sean Murray (from (England) Colchester United)
11	FW	SWE	Gustaf Nilsson (from Brøndby)
12	FW	DEN	Adam Jakobsen (from Frem)
14	DF	DEN	Thomas Gundelund (from Vejle U19)
19	MF	DEN	Lucas From (from Vejle U19)
23	DF	CGO	Emmersón (from (Ukraine) Olimpik Donetsk)
–	FW	CHN	Zeng Qingshen (from (China) Guangzhou Evergrande)

Out:

No.	Pos.	Nation	Player
8	MF	DEN	Kim Elgaard (released)
9	FW	NGA	Peter Utaka (to (Japan) Tokushima Vortis)
10	FW	ARM	David Arshakyan (released)
11	MF	DEN	Christian Kudsk (on loan to Thisted)
13	FW	CIV	Adriel Ba Loua (loan return to (Ivory Coast) ASEC Mimosas)
14	DF	DEN	Nicolaj Ritter (released)
18	MF	MDA	Alexandru Boiciuc (on loan to (Moldova) Sheriff Tiraspol)
23	FW	ITA	Simone Branca (to (Italy) Cittadella)

=== Vendsyssel ===
In:

No.	Pos.	Nation	Player
—	DF	DEN	Jeppe Svenningsen (from Thisted)
—	MF	DEN	Allan Høvenhoff (from Thisted)
—	FW	DEN	Mads Boe Mikkelsen (from AGF U19)
—	DF	DEN	Daniel Christensen (from (Belgium) Westerlo)
—	DF	DEN	Alexander Juel Andersen (from AGF)
—	DF	DEN	Søren Henriksen (from Helsingør)

Out:

No.	Pos.	Nation	Player
6	MF	DEN	Mathias Schlie (released)
24	DF	DEN	Christian Overby (to Køge)
