= Damgaard =

Damgaard is a Danish surname. Notable people with the surname include:

- Emil Damgaard (born 1998), Danish footballer
- Holger Damgaard (1870–1945), Danish photographer
- Jesper Damgaard (born 1975), Danish ice hockey player
- Laura Damgaard (born 1996), Danish handball player
- Malinda Damgaard (born 1981), Swedish milliner
- Michael Damgaard (born 1990), Danish handball player
- Thais Damgaard (born 2000), Danish footballer
- Thomas Damgaard (born 1971), Danish boxer
- Thorbjørn Damgaard, Norwegian footballer

== See also ==
- Hans Fuglsang-Damgaard (1890–1979), Danish Lutheran bishop
- Damsgaard
