= Overby =

Overby is a surname. Notable people with the surname include:

- Nathaniel Overby (born 2008), High jumper
- Christian Overby (born 1985), Danish footballer
- Håkon Øverby (1941–2021), retired Norwegian sport wrestler
- Jason Overby (born 1975), American artist and critic
- Lacy Overby (1920–1994), virologist

== See also ==
- Overbye
