= Damsgaard =

Damsgaard is a surname of Danish origin, meaning "pond farmstead". Notable people with the surname include:

- Mikael Damsgaard (born 1976), Swedish politician
- Mikkel Damsgaard (born 2000), Danish professional footballer
- Tobias Damsgaard (born 1998), Danish footballer

== See also ==
- Damgaard
