= 2017–18 in Croatian football =

Football in Croatia
- Season: 2017–18

Men's football
- Prva HNL: Dinamo Zagreb
- Druga HNL: Gorica
- Treća HNL: Osijek II (North); Vinogradar (West); Croatia Zmijavci (South)
- Croatian Cup: Dinamo Zagreb

The following article presents a summary of the 2017–18 football season in Croatia, which will be the 27th season of competitive football in the country.

== National teams ==
=== Croatia ===
Date	Venue	Opponents	Score	Croatia scorer(s)	Report
2018 FIFA World Cup qualification - Group stage
3 September 2017	Stadion Maksimir, Zagreb	Kosovo	1–0	Vida	UEFA.com
5 September 2017	New Eskişehir Stadium, Eskişehir	Turkey	0–1		UEFA.com
6 October 2017	Stadion Rujevica, Rijeka	Finland	1–1	Mandžukić	UEFA.com
9 October 2017	Olympic Stadium, Kyiv	Ukraine	2–0	Kramarić (2)	UEFA.com
2018 FIFA World Cup qualification - Second Round
9 November 2017	Stadion Maksimir, Zagreb	Greece	4–1	Modrić, Kalinić, Perišić, Kramarić	UEFA.com
12 November 2017	Karaiskakis Stadium, Piraeus	Greece	0–0		UEFA.com
Friendly fixtures
23 March 2018	Hard Rock Stadium, Miami	Peru	0–2		
27 March 2018	AT&T Stadium, Arlington	Mexico	1–0	Rakitić	
3 June 2018	Anfield, Liverpool	Brazil	0–2		
8 June 2018	Stadion Gradski vrt, Osijek	Senegal	2–1	Perišić, Kramarić	

=== Croatia U21 ===
Date	Venue	Opponents	Score	Croatia scorer(s)	Report
2019 UEFA European Under-21 Championship qualification - Group stage
31 August 2017	Zimbru Stadium, Chișinău	Moldova	3–0	Ćorić, Brekalo (2)	UEFA.com
5 October 2017	Stadion Varteks, Varaždin	Belarus	2–1	Šimić, Benković	UEFA.com
9 October 2017	Stadion Varteks, Varaždin	Czech Republic	5–1	Karačić, Vlašić (2), Brekalo, Moro	UEFA.com
8 November 2017	Stadion Radnik, Velika Gorica	San Marino	5–0	Jakoliš (3), Bočkaj, Brekalo	UEFA.com
13 November 2017	Toumba Stadium, Thessaloniki	Greece	1–1	Brekalo	UEFA.com
23 March 2018	Městský stadion, Karviná	Czech Republic	1–2	Ćaleta-Car	UEFA.com
27 March 2018	Stadion Radnik, Velika Gorica	Moldova	4–0	Vlašić (2), Jakoliš, Karačić	UEFA.com
Friendly fixtures
4 September 2017	Stadion Hartberg, Hartberg	Austria	1–1	Ćorić	HNS-CFF.hr

=== Croatia U19 ===
Date	Venue	Opponents	Score	Croatia scorer(s)	Report
2018 UEFA European Under-19 Championship qualification - Qualifying round
8 November 2017	Stadion Valbruna, Rovinj	San Marino	3–0	Kulenović (2), Nejašmić	UEFA.com
11 November 2017	Stadion Valbruna, Rovinj	Latvia	0–0		UEFA.com
14 November 2017	Stadion Kunfin, Rovinj	Denmark	2–5	Javorčić, Špikić	UEFA.com

=== Croatia U17 ===
Date	Venue	Opponents	Score	Croatia scorer(s)	Report
2018 UEFA European Under-17 Championship qualification - Qualifying round
19 October 2017	Selman Stërmasi Stadium, Tirana	Albania	1–0	Krizmanić	UEFA.com
22 October 2017	Elbasan Arena, Elbasan	Liechtenstein	6–0	Marin (2), Šarić, Krizmanić, Vušković, Brnić	UEFA.com
25 October 2017	Elbasan Arena, Elbasan	Spain	1–1	Vušković	UEFA.com
2018 UEFA European Under-17 Championship qualification - Elite round
9 March 2018	Stadion Aldo Drosina, Pula	Sweden	0–0		UEFA.com
12 March 2018	Stadion Kantrida, Rijeka	Cyprus	1–1	Marin	UEFA.com
15 March 2018	Stadion Kantrida, Rijeka	Belgium	1–2	Vušković	UEFA.com

=== Croatia Women's ===
Date	Venue	Opponents	Score	Croatia scorer(s)	Report
2019 FIFA Women's World Cup qualification - Group stage
15 September 2017	Arena Lviv, Lviv	Ukraine	1–1	Rudelic	UEFA.com
19 September 2017	Stadion Varteks, Varaždin	Sweden	0–2		UEFA.com
19 October 2017	Ménfői úti Stadion, Győr	Hungary	2–2	Žigić, Dujmenović	UEFA.com
24 October 2017	Stadion ŠRC Zaprešić, Zaprešić	Denmark	0–4		UEFA.com
5 April 2018	Stadion Stanovi, Zadar	Ukraine	0–3		UEFA.com
9 April 2018	Stadion Stanovi, Zadar	Hungary	1–3	Žigić	UEFA.com
7 June 2018	Gamla Ullevi, Gothenburg	Sweden	0–4		UEFA.com

=== Croatia Women's U19 ===
Date	Venue	Opponents	Score	Croatia scorer(s)	Report
2018 UEFA Women's Under-19 Championship qualification - Qualifying round
17 October 2017	Thermenstadion, Bad Waltersdorf	Austria	0–4		UEFA.com
20 October 2017	Thermenstadion, Bad Waltersdorf	Belgium	0–7		UEFA.com
23 October 2017	Thermenstadion, Bad Waltersdorf	North Macedonia	1–0	Spajić	UEFA.com

=== Croatia Women's U17 ===
Date	Venue	Opponents	Score	Croatia scorer(s)	Report
2018 UEFA Women's Under-17 Championship qualification - Qualifying round
16 October 2017	Uddevalla Arena, Ljungskile	Russia	0–2		UEFA.com
19 October 2017	Uddevalla Arena, Ljungskile	Sweden	0–11		UEFA.com
22 October 2017	Uddevalla Arena, Ljungskile	Israel	1–2	Lucić	UEFA.com

== League tables ==
=== Croatian First Football League ===
Pos	Team	Pld	W	D	L	GF	GA	GD	Pts	Qualification or relegation
1	Dinamo Zagreb (C)	36	22	7	7	68	34	+34	73	Qualification for the Champions League second qualifying round
2	Rijeka	36	22	4	10	75	32	+43	70	Qualification for the Europa League third qualifying round (Note: Since the winners of the 2017–18 Croatian Football Cup, Dinamo Zagreb, qualified for European competition based on league position, the spot awarded to the cup winners (Europa League third qualifying round) was passed to the runners-up, the spot awarded to the runners-up was passed to the third-placed team, and the spot awarded to the third-placed team was passed to the fourth-placed team.)
3	Hajduk Split	36	19	9	8	70	38	+32	66	Qualification for the Europa League second qualifying round
4	Osijek	36	14	14	8	53	38	+15	56	Qualification for the Europa League first qualifying round
5	Lokomotiva	36	14	9	13	47	48	−1	51	
6	Slaven Belupo	36	11	10	15	35	45	−10	43	
7	Inter Zaprešić	36	11	10	15	43	64	−21	43	
8	Rudeš	36	10	10	16	41	62	−21	40	
9	Istra 1961 (O)	36	6	9	21	28	60	−32	27	Qualification for the Relegation play-offs
10	Cibalia (R)	36	6	8	22	36	75	−39	26	Relegation to Croatian Second Football League

Source: PrvaHNL.hr
Rules for classification: 1) Points; 2) Head-to-head points; 3) Head-to-head goal difference; 4) Head-to-head goals scored (at home if two teams tied); 5) Goal difference; 6) Goals scored; 7) Play-off
(Note: Criteria 2–4 and 7 is only used if deciding champion, teams to international competition or teams for relegation and in that case criteria 6 will not be used).
(C) Champions; (O) Play-off winners; (R) Relegated

=== Croatian Second Football League ===
Pos	Team	Pld	W	D	L	GF	GA	GD	Pts	Qualification or relegation (Note: Dinamo Zagreb II and Hajduk Split II are ineligible for promotion)
1	Gorica (C, P)	33	18	8	7	44	29	+15	62	Promotion to the Croatian First Football League
2	Varaždin	33	18	7	8	50	32	+18	61 (Note: Head-to-head points: Varaždin 6, Dinamo 0)	Qualification to the promotion play-off
3	Dinamo Zagreb II	33	18	7	8	43	25	+18	61	Reserve teams are ineligible for promotion to the Croatian First Football League
4	Sesvete	33	16	6	11	46	38	+8	54	
5	Hajduk Split II	33	15	5	13	44	32	+12	50	Reserve teams are ineligible for promotion to the Croatian First Football League
6	Dugopolje	33	13	7	13	34	37	−3	46	
7	Šibenik	33	11	9	13	39	43	−4	42	
8	Kustošija	33	11	7	15	34	39	−5	40	
9	Solin	33	9	7	17	31	48	−17	34 (Note: Head-to-head points: Solin 9, Lučko 5, Dragovoljac 2)	
10	Lučko	33	8	10	15	27	40	−13	34	
11	Hrvatski Dragovoljac	33	8	10	15	37	48	−11	34	Qualification to the relegation play-off
12	Novigrad (R)	33	8	7	18	32	50	−18	31	Relegation to the Croatian Third Football League

Source: Druga-HNL.com
Rules for classification: 1) Points; 2) Head-to-head points; 3) Head-to-head goal difference; 4) Head-to-head away goals scored
(C) Champions; (P) Promoted; (R) Relegated

== Croatian clubs in Europe ==
=== Summary ===
Club	Competition	Starting round	Final round	Matches played
Rijeka	Champions League	2nd qualifying round	Play-off round	6
Rijeka	Europa League	Group stage		6
Dinamo Zagreb	Europa League	3rd qualifying round	Play-off round	4
Hajduk Split	Europa League	2nd qualifying round	Play-off round	6
Osijek	Europa League	1st qualifying round	Play-off round	8
Osijek	Women's Champions League	Qualifying round		3
Lokomotiva U19	UEFA Youth League	First round	Second round	4

=== Rijeka ===
Date	Venue	Opponents	Score	Rijeka scorer(s)	Report
2017–18 Champions League - Second qualifying round
11 July 2017	Stadion Rujevica, Rijeka	(Wales) The New Saints	2–0	Mišić, Matei	UEFA.com
18 July 2017	Park Hall, Oswestry	(Wales) The New Saints	5–1	Matei, Gavranović (2), Gorgon, Ristovski	UEFA.com
2017–18 Champions League - Third qualifying round
26 July 2017	Red Bull Arena, Wals-Siezenheim	(Austria) Red Bull Salzburg	1–1	Gavranović	UEFA.com
2 August 2017	Stadion Rujevica, Rijeka	(Austria) Red Bull Salzburg	0–0		UEFA.com
2017–18 Champions League - Play-off round
16 August 2017	Karaiskakis Stadium, Piraeus	(Greece) Olympiacos	1–2	Héber	UEFA.com
22 August 2017	Stadion Rujevica, Rijeka	(Greece) Olympiacos	0–1		UEFA.com
2017–18 UEFA Europa League group stage
14 September 2017	Stadion Rujevica, Rijeka	(Greece) AEK Athens	1–2	Elez	UEFA.com
28 September 2017	San Siro, Milan	(Italy) Milan	2–3	Acosty, Elez	UEFA.com
19 October 2017	Ernst-Happel-Stadion, Vienna	Austria Wien	3–1	Gavranović (2), Kvržić	UEFA.com
2 November 2017	Stadion Rujevica, Rijeka	Austria Wien	1–4	Pavičić	UEFA.com
23 November 2017	Olympic Stadium, Athens	(Greece) AEK Athens	2–2	Gorgon (2)	UEFA.com
7 December 2017	Stadion Rujevica, Rijeka	(Italy) Milan	2–0	Puljić, Gavranović	UEFA.com

=== Dinamo Zagreb ===
Date	Venue	Opponents	Score	Dinamo Zagreb scorer(s)	Report
2017–18 Europa League - Third qualifying round
27 July 2017	Stadion Maksimir, Zagreb	(Norway) Odd	2–1	Hodžić, Fernandes	UEFA.com
3 August 2017	Skagerak Arena, Skien	(Norway) Odd	0–0		UEFA.com
2017–18 Europa League - Play-off round
17 August 2017	Stadion Maksimir, Zagreb	(Albania) Skënderbeu Korçë	1–1	Henríquez	UEFA.com
24 August 2017	Elbasan Arena, Elbasan	(Albania) Skënderbeu Korçë	0–0		UEFA.com

=== Hajduk Split ===
Date	Venue	Opponents	Score	Hajduk Split scorer(s)	Report
2017–18 Europa League - Second qualifying round
13 July 2017	Stadion Hrvatski vitezovi, Dugopolje	(Bulgaria) Levski Sofia	1–0	Futács	UEFA.com
20 July 2017	Georgi Asparuhov Stadium, Sofia	(Bulgaria) Levski Sofia	2–1	Ohandza, Erceg	UEFA.com
2017–18 Europa League - Third qualifying round
27 July 2017	Brøndby Stadium, Brøndby	(Denmark) Brøndby	0–0		UEFA.com
3 August 2017	Stadion Poljud, Split	(Denmark) Brøndby	2–0	Erceg (2)	UEFA.com
2017–18 Europa League - Play-off round
17 August 2017	Goodison Park, Liverpool	(England) Everton	0–2		UEFA.com
24 August 2017	Stadion Poljud, Split	(England) Everton	1–1	Radošević	UEFA.com

=== Osijek ===
Date	Venue	Opponents	Score	Osijek scorer(s)	Report
2017–18 Europa League - First qualifying round
29 June 2017	Estadi Comunal, Andorra la Vella	(Andorra) UE Santa Coloma	2–0	Mioč, Lukić	UEFA.com
6 July 2017	Stadion Gradski vrt, Osijek	(Andorra) UE Santa Coloma	4–0	Ejupi, Barišić, Bočkaj (2)	UEFA.com
2017–18 Europa League - Second qualifying round
13 July 2017	Stadion Gradski vrt, Osijek	(Switzerland) Luzern	2–0	Ejupi, Grezda	UEFA.com
20 July 2017	Swissporarena, Lucerne	(Switzerland) Luzern	1–2	Ejupi	UEFA.com
2017–18 Europa League - Third qualifying round
27 July 2017	Philips Stadion, Eindhoven	(Netherlands) PSV Eindhoven	1–0	Barišić	UEFA.com
3 August 2017	Stadion Gradski vrt, Osijek	(Netherlands) PSV Eindhoven	1–0	Bočkaj	UEFA.com
2017–18 Europa League - Play-off round
17 August 2017	Stadion Gradski vrt, Osijek	Austria Wien	1–2	Ejupi	UEFA.com
24 August 2017	NV Arena, Sankt Pölten	Austria Wien	1–0	Boban	UEFA.com

=== ŽNK Osijek ===
Date	Venue	Opponents	Score	ŽNK Osijek scorer(s)	Report
2017–18 UEFA Women's Champions League - Qualifying round
22 August 2017	Stadion Gradski vrt, Osijek	(North Macedonia) ŽFK Istatov	7–0	Balić (3), Nevrkla, Andrlić, Jakovac, Lojna	UEFA.com
25 August 2017	Stadion Gradski vrt, Osijek	(Faroe Islands) KÍ Klaksvík	4–0	Andrlić, Bojčić, Nevrkla, Jakovac	UEFA.com
28 August 2017	Stadion Gradski vrt, Osijek	(Iceland) Stjarnan	0–1		UEFA.com

=== Lokomotiva U19 ===
Date	Venue	Opponents	Score	Lokomotiva U19 scorer(s)	Report
2017–18 UEFA Youth League Domestic Champions Path - First round
26 September 2017	Stadionul Dinamo, Bucharest	(Romania) Dinamo București	2–0	Kastrati, Dunić	UEFA.com
18 October 2017	Stadion Lučko, Zagreb	(Romania) Dinamo București	2–2	Krajinović, Vranjković	UEFA.com
2017–18 UEFA Youth League Domestic Champions Path - Second round
31 October 2017	Stadion Lučko, Zagreb	(Bosnia and Herzegovina) Željezničar	1–1	Vranjković	UEFA.com
22 November 2017	Stadion Grbavica, Sarajevo	(Bosnia and Herzegovina) Željezničar	0–0		UEFA.com
