= Overbye =

Overbye is a surname and may refer to the following individuals:

- Dagmar Overbye (1883–1929), a Danish serial killer
- Dennis Overbye (born 1944), a science writer specializing in physics and cosmology
- Erik Overbye (born 1934), a Danish film producer
- Marie Overbye (born 1976), an athlete from Denmark

== See also ==
- Overby
