= Thomas Gundelund =

Danish footballer (born 2001)

Personal information
- Full name: Thomas Gundelund Nielsen
- Date of birth: 6 November 2001 (age 25)
- Place of birth: Skive, Denmark
- Height: 1.80 m (5 ft 11 in)
- Position: Right-back

Team information
- Current team: Vejle
- Number: 2

Youth career
- Skive
- Vejle

Senior career*
Years	Team	Apps	(Gls)
2017–	Vejle	134	(2)

International career^{‡}
2017	Denmark U16	6	(0)
2017–2018	Denmark U17	11	(0)
2018–2019	Denmark U18	5	(0)
2018–2020	Denmark U19	11	(0)
- * Club domestic league appearances and goals as of 19 May 2026 ‡ National team caps and goals as of 6 September 2020

Thomas Gundelund Nielsen (born 6 November 2001) is a Danish professional footballer who plays as a right-back for and captains Danish Superliga club Vejle.

== Club career ==
Gundelund joined Vejle at the age of 14 from Skive. On 14 September 2020, he made his Danish Superliga debut at the age of only 16 years and 20 days in a game against AGF. This made him the Vejle's youngest player ever, beating Mads Døhr Thychosen's record that was set four years earlier.

In December 2017, he signed a three-year deal with the club until 31 December 2020.

== Career statistics ==
=== Club ===
As of match played 1 December 2024

Appearances and goals by club, season and competition
Club	Season	League			Danish Cup		Other		Total	
Club	Season	Division	Apps	Goals	Apps	Goals	Apps	Goals	Apps	Goals
Vejle	2017–18	Danish 1st Division	1	0	0	0	—		1	0
Vejle	2018–19	Danish Superliga	0	0	0	0	0	0	0	0
Vejle	2019–20	Danish 1st Division	26	1	0	0	—		26	1
Vejle	2020–21	Danish Superliga	11	0	1	0	—		12	0
Vejle	2021–22	Danish Superliga	11	0	0	0	—		11	0
Vejle	2022–23	Danish 1st Division	15	0	3	0	—		18	0
Vejle	2023–24	Danish Superliga	19	0	2	0	—		21	0
Vejle	2024–25	Danish Superliga	7	0	0	0	—		7	0
Career total			90	1	6	0	0	0	96	1

== Honours ==
Vejle

- Danish 1st Division: 2022–23
