= Thais Damgaard =

Danish footballer (born 2000)

Personal information
- Full name: Thais Damgaard Nielsen
- Date of birth: 23 March 2000 (age 26)
- Place of birth: Denmark
- Position: Winger

Team information
- Current team: VSK Aarhus (on loan from Vejle)
- Number: 11

Youth career
- Horsens KFUM
- AC Horsens
- 2015–2019: Vejle

Senior career*
Years	Team	Apps	(Gls)
2018–	Vejle	1	(0)
2019	→ Helsinki IFK (loan)	2	(0)
2020	→ Middelfart (loan)	5	(0)
2020–	→ VSK Aarhus (loan)	4	(1)

International career
2016	Denmark U16	2	(0)
2019	Denmark U19	1	(1)
- * Club domestic league appearances and goals as of 11:11, 17 October 2020 (UTC)

Thais Damgaard Nielsen (born 23 March 2000), is a Danish footballer who plays as a winger for VSK Aarhus on loan from Vejle Boldklub.

== Career ==
=== Vejle BK ===
Damgaard joined Vejle Boldklub in January 2015 at the age of 14 from AC Horsens and was immediately promoted to the U17 squad.

He got his first team debut on 11 September 2018 in a Danish Cup game against BK Frem. Damgaard started on the bench, before replacing Sean Murray in the 80th minute in a game which Vejle won after penalties. In December 2019, he also got his debut in the Danish Superliga.

Ahead of the 2019–20 season, Damgaard was permanently promoted to the first team squad and signed a 1-year full-time professional contract after a good season with the U19s, scoring 12 goals which made him the top scorer of the team. On 22 July 2019, Damgaard signed a new three-year contract with Vejle and was loaned out to Finnish club Helsinki IFK, a club owned by the same owner of Vejle. On 22 January 2020, Damgaard was loaned out again, this time to Danish 2nd Division club Middelfart G&BK.

At the end of the loan deal with Middelfart, it was confirmed by Vejle on 28 July 2020, that Damgaard would play the rest of 2020 at VSK Aarhus in the Danish 2nd Division, before he would leave Vejle at the end of the year, where his contract expired.

== Personal life ==
Damgaard's grandad, Anders Damgaard, was also a footballer and played 110 division games for Horsens fS in the 1950s. His mother, Gitte Damgaard, is a former handball player who played for Horsens HK.

== Career statistics ==
=== Club ===
As of 8 December 2019.

Club	Season	League			Cup		Continental		Other		Total	
Club	Season	Division	Apps	Goals	Apps	Goals	Apps	Goals	Apps	Goals	Apps	Goals
Vejle Boldklub	2018–19	Danish Superliga	1	0	0	0	0	0	0	0	1	0
HIFK (loan)	2019	Veikkausliiga	2	0	0	0	0	0	0	0	2	0
Career total			3	0	0	0	0	0	0	0	3	0
