= Emil Damgaard =

Danish footballer (born 1998)

Personal information
- Full name: Emil Lyngsø Kjær Damgaard
- Date of birth: 20 August 1998 (age 28)
- Place of birth: Denmark
- Position: Right-back

Team information
- Current team: Vendsyssel (U19 manager)

Youth career
- Slagslunde-Ganløse IF
- 2010–2017: Nordsjælland

Senior career*
| Years | Team | Apps | (Gls) |
| 2016–2019 | Nordsjælland | 2 | (0) |

International career
| 2015 | Denmark U-18 | 2 | (0) |

Managerial career
- 2023–: Vendsyssel (youth coach)
- * Club domestic league appearances and goals as of 1 October 2016

Emil Lyngsø Kjær Damgaard (born 20 August 1998) is a Danish retired footballer who played as a right-back. He is currently manager of Vendsyssel FF's U19 team.

== Club career ==
=== FC Nordsjælland ===
Damgaard came to FC Nordsjælland at the age of 11 from Slagslunde-Ganløse IF.

He got his debut for FC Nordsjælland on 1 May 2016 at the age of 17, where played 26 minutes, before he got an anterior cruciate ligament injury. He got replaced by Pascal Gregor in the 2–2 draw against Randers FC in the Danish Superliga. He began his rehabilitation in the winter 2016 but unfortunately, his new ligament broke again and thus a new surgery was required. He began training again in the summer break and took with the first team squad to the Netherlands.

Damgaard got promoted to the first team squad on 6 July 2017. He had a tough beginning of the new season, where he was out with several injuries. Due to his several injuries, his contract wasn't extended and he left the club at the end of the 2018–19 season. Damgaard decided to give up his dream and retired at the age of 22 due to the injuries.

== Coaching career ==
After moving to Aalborg to study, Damgaard began his coaching career at Vendsyssel FF, where he was hired as a coach at the club's academy in July 2023.
