= Patrick Egelund =

Danish footballer (born 2000)

Personal information
- Full name: Patrick Hessellund Egelund
- Date of birth: 2 August 2000 (age 26)
- Place of birth: Holsted, Denmark
- Position: Winger

Team information
- Current team: Fredericia
- Number: 9

Youth career
- Holsted fB
- Esbjerg fB

Senior career*
Years	Team	Apps	(Gls)
2019–2021	Esbjerg fB	31	(3)
2021–	Fredericia	85	(12)

International career
2017	Denmark U17	5	(1)
2017	Denmark U18	4	(0)
2018	Denmark U19	2	(0)
- * Club domestic league appearances and goals as of 19 May 2026

Patrick Hessellund Egelund (born 2 August 2000) is a Danish footballer who plays for FC Fredericia.

== Youth career ==
Egelund started playing football at the age of three alongside his older brother, Martin. They played together in a local club, Holsted fB, despite their age difference. Later, he joined Esbjerg fB, still alongside his brother, and Patrick signed his first contract on his 15th birthday. Patrick received a new contract in October 2017, which would keep him at the club until June 2020.

== Career ==
=== Esbjerg fB ===
On 7 April 2019, Egelund got his official debut for Esbjerg, when he came on from the bench against FC Midtjylland with 10 minutes left. Egelund played two games in the Danish Superliga in the 2018/19 season, and was permanently promoted to the first team squad for the 2019/20 season. On 2 July 2019, Egelund signed a 4-year senior deal with the club.

He terminated his contract with Esbjerg on 4 August 2021.

=== Fredericia ===
On 13 August 2021, Egelund joined FC Fredericia on a deal until June 2023. In the 2024–25 season he helped the club getting promoted to the Danish Superliga for the first time in club history existence.

== Personal life ==
Patrick is the younger brother of Martin Egelund, who also is a footballer. The two brothers also played together in Esbjerg on several youth teams and the reserve team. Both their parents also played football.
