= Ognjen Mitrović =

Serbian footballer

Personal information
- Date of birth: 30 June 1999 (age 27)
- Place of birth: Sremska Kamenica, Serbia and Montenegro
- Height: 1.80 m (5 ft 11 in)
- Positions: Defender; midfielder

Team information
- Current team: Tekstilac Derventa

Youth career
- Vojvodina
- Brodarac

Senior career*
Years	Team	Apps	(Gls)
2018–2022	Proleter Novi Sad	93	(3)
2022–2023	Spartak Subotica	9	(0)
2023–2024	RFK Novi Sad	8	(0)
2024–	Tekstilac Derventa		
- * Club domestic league appearances and goals as of 26 December 2023

Ognjen Mitrović (born 30 June 1999) is a Serbian professional footballer who plays for Tekstilac Derventa.

== Club career ==
He made his Serbian SuperLiga debut for Proleter Novi Sad on 22 July 2018 in a game against Radnički Niš.
