= Lasha Parunashvili =

Georgian footballer (born 1993)

Personal information
- Date of birth: 14 February 1993 (age 33)
- Place of birth: Tbilisi, Georgia
- Height: 1.82 m (6 ft 0 in)
- Position: Midfielder

Team information
- Current team: Khujand
- Number: 14

Senior career*
Years	Team	Apps	(Gls)
2010–2011	Saburtalo Tbilisi	0	(0)
2010	→ Metalurgi Rustavi (loan)	2	(0)
2011	→ Sioni Bolnisi (loan)	0	(0)
2011–2017	Dinamo Tbilisi	65	(2)
2013	→ Sioni Bolnisi (loan)	11	(0)
2014	→ Tskhinvali (loan)	14	(2)
2017–2022	Esbjerg	137	(5)
2022–2023	Saburtalo Tbilisi	16	(0)
2023	Maktaaral	11	(0)
2024	Samtredia	6	(0)
2025	Al-Jazeera		
2025	Gareji Sagarejo	6	(0)
2026–	Khujand	0	(0)

International career^{‡}
2009–2010	Georgia U17	6	(0)
2011–2012	Georgia U19	6	(1)
2012–2014	Georgia U21	8	(1)
2017–2019	Georgia	2	(0)
- * Club domestic league appearances and goals as of April 2026 ‡ National team caps and goals as of 10 June 2019

Lasha Parunashvili (Georgian: ლაშა პარუნაშვილი; born 14 February 1993) is a Georgian professional footballer who plays as a midfielder for Tajikistan Higher League club Khujand.

== Club career ==
On 15 February 2026, Tajikistan Higher League club Khujand announced the signing of Parunashvili.

== International career ==
Parunashvili made his debut for the national team in a friendly game against Uzbekistan on 23 January 2017.

== Honours ==
Individual

- Esbjerg fB Player of the Season: 2021–22
