= Michael Omosanya =

Luxembourgish association football player

Personal information
- Full name: Michael Qudus Bakare Omosanya
- Date of birth: 25 December 1999 (age 26)
- Place of birth: Luxembourg City, Luxembourg
- Height: 1.88 m (6 ft 2 in)
- Position: Forward

Team information
- Current team: Olympic Charleroi (on loan from Jeunesse Esch)
- Number: 9

Youth career
- 2006–2013: Red Star Merl-Belair
- 2012–2018: F91 Dudelange

Senior career*
Years	Team	Apps	(Gls)
2018–2019	F91 Dudelange	0	(0)
2018–2019	→ Remich-Bous (loan)	19	(10)
2019–2021	Mondercange	9	(1)
2021–2022	Fola Esch	19	(3)
2022–2023	Eintracht Trier	21	(0)
2023–2024	Fola Esch	10	(1)
2024–2025	Thionville	39	(9)
2025–	Jeunesse Esch	14	(2)
2026–	→ Olympic Charleroi (loan)	4	(0)

International career^{‡}
2021–	Luxembourg	4	(0)
- * Club domestic league appearances and goals as of 20 April 2026 ‡ National team caps and goals as of 17:06, 15 November 2024 (UTC)

Michael Qudus Bakare Omosanya (born 25 December 1999) is a Luxembourgish footballer who plays as a forward for Olympic Charleroi, on loan from Jeunesse Esch and the Luxembourg national team.

== Club career ==
Omosanya began playing football with the youth academy of Red Star Merl-Belair at the age of 6, and moved to F91 Dudelange's academy at the age of 12. He began his senior career on loan with Remich-Bous, before transferring to Mondercange in 2019. He made his way to the senior team of Fola Esch in the summer of 2021.

== International career ==
Born in Luxembourg, Omosanya is of Nigerian descent. He debuted with the Luxembourg national team on 9 October 2021 in a 1–0 2022 FIFA World Cup qualification loss to Serbia.
