= Mikkel Basse =

Danish footballer (born 1996)

Personal information
- Full name: Mikkel Fossum Basse
- Date of birth: 31 August 1996 (age 30)
- Place of birth: Virum, Denmark
- Height: 1.80 m (5 ft 11 in)
- Position: Midfielder

Youth career
- Lyngby

Senior career*
Years	Team	Apps	(Gls)
2016–2019	Helsingør	88	(2)
2019–2020	Roskilde	6	(0)
2020	Vendsyssel	15	(0)
2021	Fredericia	14	(0)
2022–2024	Fremad Amager	55	(1)
2025	Nykøbing	14	(2)
- * Club domestic league appearances and goals as of 23 April 2024

Mikkel Fossum Basse (born 31 August 1996) is a Danish professional footballer who plays as a midfielder.

== Career ==
=== FC Helsingør ===
Before joining FC Helsingør, Basse spent his youth career with Lyngby Boldklub before his contract expired in the summer 2016. Basse then went on a trial with Helsingør, where he played four friendly games with the club, before signing a two-year deal on 22 July 2016. Two days later, he got his official debut for the club, playing the first 92 minutes in a 1–0 victory against AB, before getting replaced by Lukas Svendsen.

After 98 games for Helsingør, the club announced on 1 August 2019, that Basse had left the club.

=== FC Roskilde ===
On 18 October 2019, Basse joined Danish 1st Division club FC Roskilde on a free agent. He left the club at the end of the year, where his contract expired.

=== Vendsyssel FF ===
Vendsyssel FF announced on 21 January 2020, that Basse had joined the club on a contract for the rest of the season. He left the club as his contract expired.

=== FC Fredericia ===
On 11 February 2021, Basse signed a deal for the rest of the season with Danish 1st Division club FC Fredericia. In December 2021 it was confirmed, that Basse would leave the club at the end of the month.

=== Fremad Amager ===
On 31 January 2022, Basse joined Fremad Amager on a deal until June 2022. He then extended until June 2024.

On September 1, 2024, the club confirmed that Basse was leaving the club as his contract had expired and could not be extended as the club was subject to some financial restrictions that made it not possible.

=== Nykøbing FC ===
On February 8, 2025, Basse moved to Danish 2nd Division side Nykøbing FC, where his younger brother, Oliver Basse, had also just joined. Basse was given a deal until the end of the season. He left the club again at the end of the season.
