= 2024–25 Vejle Boldklub season =

Vejle Boldklub
2024–25 season
- Stadium: Vejle Stadium
- Danish Superliga: Pre-season
- Danish Cup: Pre-season

The 2024–25 season is the 134th season in the history of Vejle Boldklub, and the club's second consecutive season in the Danish Superliga. In addition to the domestic league, the team is scheduled to participate in the Danish Cup.

== Friendlies ==
=== Pre-season ===
29 June 2024 Friendly	Brøndby IF (Denmark)	0–2	(Denmark) Vejle	Brøndby
14:00			Emmanouilidis 24'; K. Jacobsen 28'	Stadium: Brøndby IF's Bane 1

13 July 2024 Friendly	Vejle (Denmark)	5–2	(Denmark) OB

=== Mid-season ===
18 January 2025 Friendly	Vejle (Denmark)	1–0	(Denmark) B93 København
14:00

24 January 2025 Friendly	Vejle (Denmark)	2–4	(Hungary) Paksi
14:45

== Competitions ==
=== Overall record ===
Competition	First match	Last match	Starting round	Record							
Competition	First match	Last match	Starting round	Pld	W	D	L	GF	GA	GD	Win %
Superliga	21 July 2024		Matchday 1	1	0	0	1	2	3	−1	0.00
Danish Cup				0	0	0	0	0	0	+0	—
Total				1	0	0	1	2	3	−1	0.00

Last updated: 21 July 2024
Source: Soccerway

=== Superliga ===
==== League table ====
Pos	Team	Pld	W	D	L	GF	GA	GD	Pts	Qualification
8	Viborg	22	7	7	8	38	39	−1	28	Qualification for the Relegation round
9	AaB	22	5	6	11	23	41	−18	21	Qualification for the Relegation round
10	Lyngby	22	3	9	10	15	26	−11	18	Qualification for the Relegation round
11	Sønderjyske	22	4	5	13	26	51	−25	17	Qualification for the Relegation round
12	Vejle	22	3	4	15	24	50	−26	13	Qualification for the Relegation round

Source: Danish Football Association (in Danish), Soccerway
Rules for classification: 1) Points; 2) Goal difference; 3) Goals scored; 4) Away goals scored; 5) Play-off (played on neutral ground if determining teams for different rounds); 6) Draw.

Pos	Team	Pld	W	D	L	GF	GA	GD	Pts	
1	Copenhagen (C)	32	18	9	5	60	33	+27	63	Qualification for the UEFA Champions League second qualifying round
2	Midtjylland	32	19	5	8	64	42	+22	62	Qualification for the UEFA Europa League second qualifying round
3	Brøndby	32	13	12	7	58	46	+12	51	Qualification for the UEFA Conference League second qualifying round
4	Randers	32	13	9	10	57	50	+7	48	Qualification for the European play-off match
5	Nordsjælland	32	13	7	12	53	56	−3	46	
6	AGF	32	10	10	12	53	46	+7	40	

Source: Danish Football Association (in Danish), Soccerway
Rules for classification: 1) Points; 2) Goal difference; 3) Goals scored; 4) Away goals scored; 5) Play-off (played on neutral ground if determining teams for different rounds); 6) Draw.
(C) Champions

Pos	Team	Pld	W	D	L	GF	GA	GD	Pts	
2	Viborg	32	12	11	9	57	50	+7	47	
3	Sønderjyske	32	10	7	15	47	64	−17	37	
4	Vejle	32	7	7	18	37	64	−27	28	
5	Lyngby (R)	32	5	12	15	26	43	−17	27	Relegation to 1st Division
6	AaB (R)	32	5	9	18	34	67	−33	24	Relegation to 1st Division

Source: Danish Football Association (in Danish), Soccerway
Rules for classification: 1) Points; 2) Goal difference; 3) Goals scored; 4) Away goals scored; 5) Play-off (played on neutral ground if determining teams for different rounds); 6) Draw.
(R) Relegated

==== Results summary ====
Overall								Home						Away					
Pld	W	D	L	GF	GA	GD	Pts	W	D	L	GF	GA	GD	W	D	L	GF	GA	GD
1	0	0	1	2	3	−1	0	0	0	1	2	3	−1	0	0	0	0	0	0

Last updated: 21 July 2024.

==== Results by round ====
Round	1
Ground	H
Result	L
Position	

Updated to match(es) played on 21 July 2024. Source:
A = Away; H = Home; W = Win; D = Draw; L = Loss

==== Matches ====
The match schedule was released on 7 June 2024.

21 July 2024 1	Vejle	2–3	Randers	Vejle
16:00	Kolinger (yellow card) 25'; Onugkha 37', 87'; Velkov (yellow card) 69'		Enggård 53'; Bolkan Nordli 59' (pen.); Lauenborg (yellow card) 76'; Bany Odeh 90+2'	Stadium: Vejle Stadium; Referee: Jacob Karlsen

29 July 2024 2	Brøndby	2–1	Vejle	Brøndbyvester
19:00	Kvistgaarden 47'; Sebulonsen 52'; Lauritsen (yellow card) 54'	Report	Velkov (yellow card) 26'; Barry (yellow card) 34'; Emmanouilidis 40'; Juwara (yellow card) 44'	Stadium: Brøndby Stadium; Attendance: 22,494; Referee: (Denmark) Mikkel Redder

5 August 2024 3	Vejle	0–1	Nordsjælland	Vejle
19:00	Barry (yellow card) 90+1'	Report	Ankersen (yellow card) 7'; Antman (yellow card) 11' (goal) 62'; Ingvartsen (yellow card) 68'	Stadium: Vejle Stadium; Attendance: 6,898; Referee: (Denmark) Jens Maae
