= Nichita Iurașco =

Moldovan footballer

Personal information
- Date of birth: 17 May 1999 (age 27)
- Place of birth: Moldova
- Height: 1.83 m (6 ft 0 in)
- Position: Midfielder

Youth career
- Zimbru Chișinău

Senior career*
Years	Team	Apps	(Gls)
2015–2017	Zimbru-2 Chișinău	42	(8)
2017–2020	Zimbru Chișinău	36	(1)
2020–2023	Milsami Orhei	40	(1)
2023	Spartanii Sportul	5	(0)

International career^{‡}
2015	Moldova U17 (Note: Only official UEFA matches included)	3	(0)
2017	Moldova U19	3	(0)
2019	Moldova U21	1	(0)
- * Club domestic league appearances and goals as of 10 May 2023 ‡ National team caps and goals as of 26 March 2019

Nichita Iurașco (born 17 May 1999) is a Moldovan footballer who plays as a midfielder.
