= Ion Donțu =

Moldovan footballer

Personal information
- Date of birth: 9 September 1999 (age 27)
- Position: Forward

Team information
- Current team: Codru Lozova (on loan from Zimbru Chișinău)

Youth career
- Zimbru Chișinău

Senior career*
Years	Team	Apps	(Gls)
2017–	Zimbru Chișinău	14	(0)
2019–	→ Codru Lozova (loan)	8	(0)
- * Club domestic league appearances and goals as of 23:12, 21 November 2019 (UTC)

Ion Donțu (born 9 September 1999) is a Moldovan football player. He plays for FC Codru Lozova on loan from FC Zimbru Chișinău.

== Club career ==
He made his Moldovan National Division debut for FC Zimbru Chișinău on 1 April 2018 in a game against FC Milsami Orhei.
