= Malinda Damgaard =

Swedish milliner (born 1981)

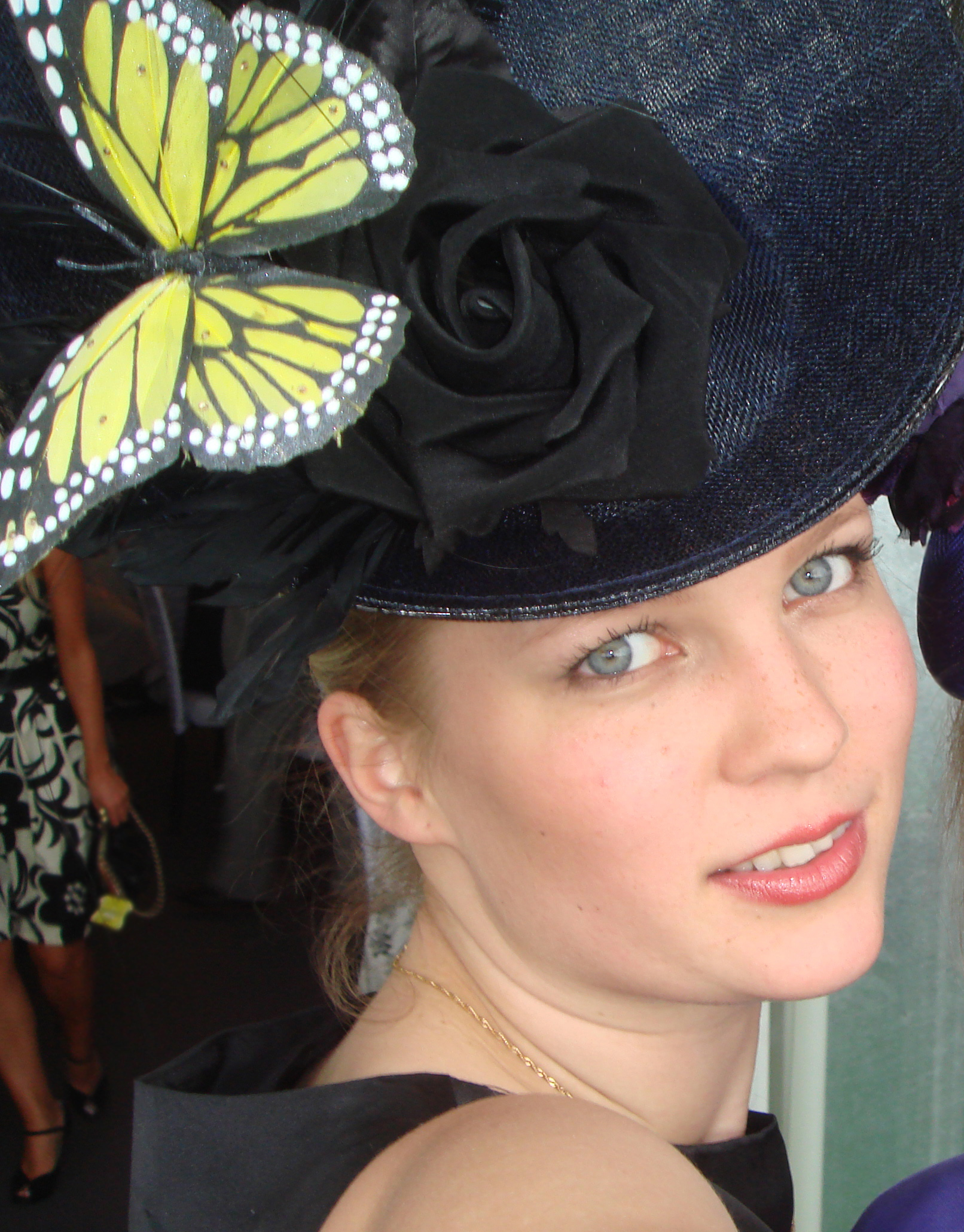
- Malinda Damgaard (2012)
- Born: 1 March 1981 (age 45); Frölunda, Sweden
- Occupation: Modist

Malinda Natalia Damgaard (born 1 March 1981) is a Swedish milliner.

== Career ==
She is educated at Tillskärarakademin in Gothenburg. She describes her design as "very technical and stylish".

Damgaard has worked for Philip Treacy in London during four and a half years and is now working in Stockholm. She worked with Lars Wallin, and she did work for Crown Princess Victoria, Princess Madeleine and Princess Estelle.

She had made an exhibition in Stockholm with the theme Sugar rush, and in early May 2013 she had an exhibition in Saint Petersburg, Russia under the theme "The Art of Sweden".

In the Swedish edition of Elle she was named the 2013 best accessoar designer. In 2013, Damgaard also hosted an episode of the radio show Sommar i P1.
