= Jyri Kiuru =

Finnish footballer (born 2000)

Personal information
- Date of birth: 9 February 2000 (age 26)
- Place of birth: Finland
- Position: Winger

Team information
- Current team: Jippo
- Number: 11

Youth career
- NuPS
- Käpylän Pallo

Senior career*
Years	Team	Apps	(Gls)
2016–2017	Käpylän Pallo	18	(4)
2018–2019	Klubi 04	22	(3)
2019–2020	SJK	8	(0)
2019–2020	SJK II	31	(10)
2021	Musan Salama	20	(3)
2022	Gnistan	23	(0)
2023	Vasa IFK	21	(6)
2024–	Jippo	74	(15)

International career
2015	Finland U15	2	(0)
	Finland U16	10	(1)
	Finland U17	11	(2)
2017	Finland U18	4	(1)
2018	Finland U19	5	(0)
- * Club domestic league appearances and goals as of 1 November 2026

Jyri Kiuru (born 9 February 2000) is a Finnish professional footballer who plays as a winger for Ykkösliiga club Jippo.
