= Jason Overby =

American artist and art critic

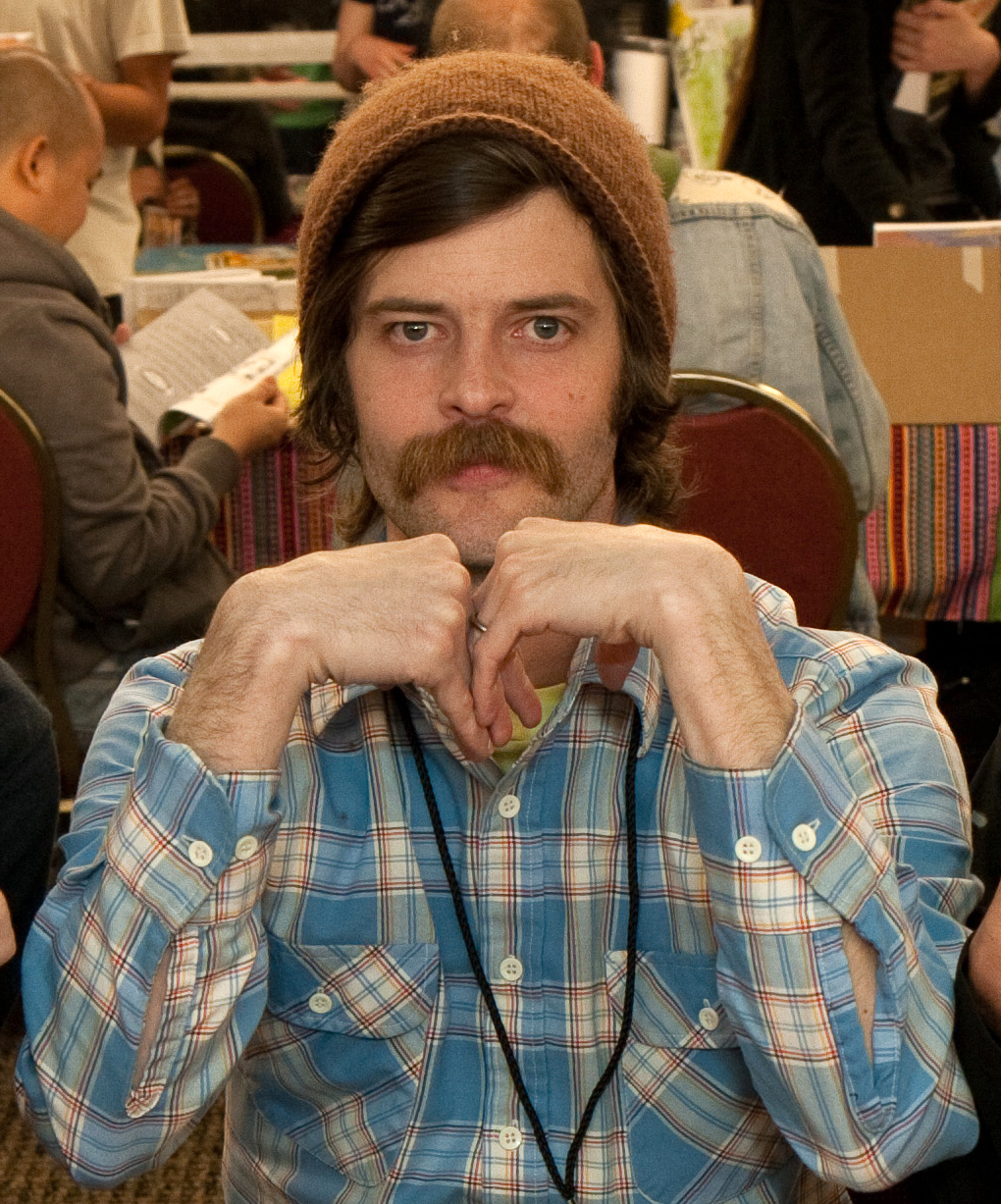
- Overby at the 2010 Stumptown Comics Fest
- Known for: Comics, drawing, collage
- Notable work: Jessica, Exploding Head Man

Jason Overby is an American artist and critic associated with the art comics and abstract comics movements. His work has appeared in online and print media. He is best known for his comic Jessica, a fusion of art comics and autobiographical comics, his graphic novel Exploding Head Man (an existential supervillain story reminiscent of Gary Panter) which was listed as a notable selection of the year in the 2010 edition of The Best American Comics., and his strip, Apophenia which appeared in Abstract Comics: the Anthology published by Fantagraphics Books.

Co-mix, which he started with Blaise Larmee in 2009 and closed in 2011, was a comics criticism blog that explored and collapsed distinctions between critic and creator.

In 2011 he began serializing the webcomic 2101.
