= Mathias Kristensen (footballer, born 1997) =

Danish footballer (born 1997)

Personal information
- Full name: Mathias Laustrup Kristensen
- Date of birth: 21 March 1997 (age 29)
- Place of birth: Næsbjerg, Denmark
- Height: 1.87 m (6 ft 2 in)
- Position: Midfielder

Team information
- Current team: Aalesund
- Number: 10

Youth career
- Næsbjerg RUI
- Esbjerg fB

Senior career*
Years	Team	Apps	(Gls)
2016–2021	Esbjerg fB	110	(12)
2021–2023	Fredericia	56	(4)
2023–2025	Hobro	48	(4)
2025–	Aalesund	2	(0)

International career
2012–2013	Denmark U-16	10	(0)
2013–2014	Denmark U-17	11	(0)
2014–2015	Denmark U-18	4	(1)
2015–2016	Denmark U-19	8	(1)
2019	Denmark U-21	2	(0)
- * Club domestic league appearances and goals as of 10 August 2026

Mathias Laustrup Kristensen (born 21 March 1997) is a Danish footballer who plays for Eliteserien side Aalesunds FK.

== Career ==
=== Esbjerg fB ===
Kristensen came to Esbjerg fB from Næsbjerg RUI, where his dad was his coach most of the years he spent there. After five years at Esbjerg and on his 15-years birthday, Kristensen signed a youth contract with the club. In March 2013, Kristensen went on a trial at Manchester United and afterwards on a trial at Fulham. Already at the age of 16, Kristen was a part of the U19 squad at Esbjerg.

From the 2015/16 season, Kristensen was permanently promoted to the first team squad at the age of 18. In September 2015, Kristen extended his contract until the summer 2018. His official debut came 10 months after he was permanently promoted to the first team squad, in May 2016 against SønderjyskE where he came from the bench with 10 minutes left. This game and one later on the same month, was the only two games he played in that season for the first team.

In September 2017, Kristensen's contract was extended once again, this time until the summer 2021. Kristensen got his breakthrough in the 2017/18 season, where he played 24 games, scoring 5 times and making 5 assist. He was often used on the wings though his regular position was in the midfield. In October 2017, he scored a hattrick against Vendsyssel FF, all three goals on set pieces.

Kristensen left the club in the summer 2021, as his contract expired.

=== Fredericia ===
On 2 June 2021, Kristensen signed a two-year deal with FC Fredericia.

=== Hobro IK ===
On 10 July 2023, Kristensen joined Hobro IK on a deal until June 2026.

=== Aalesund ===
On January 3, 2025, it was confirmed that Kristensen, after a year and a half in Hobro, moved to Norwegian First Division side Aalesunds FK on a three-year deal. Aalesund won promotion to the 2026 Eliteserien via playoff.
