= Iuri Tabatadze =

Georgian footballer (born 1999)

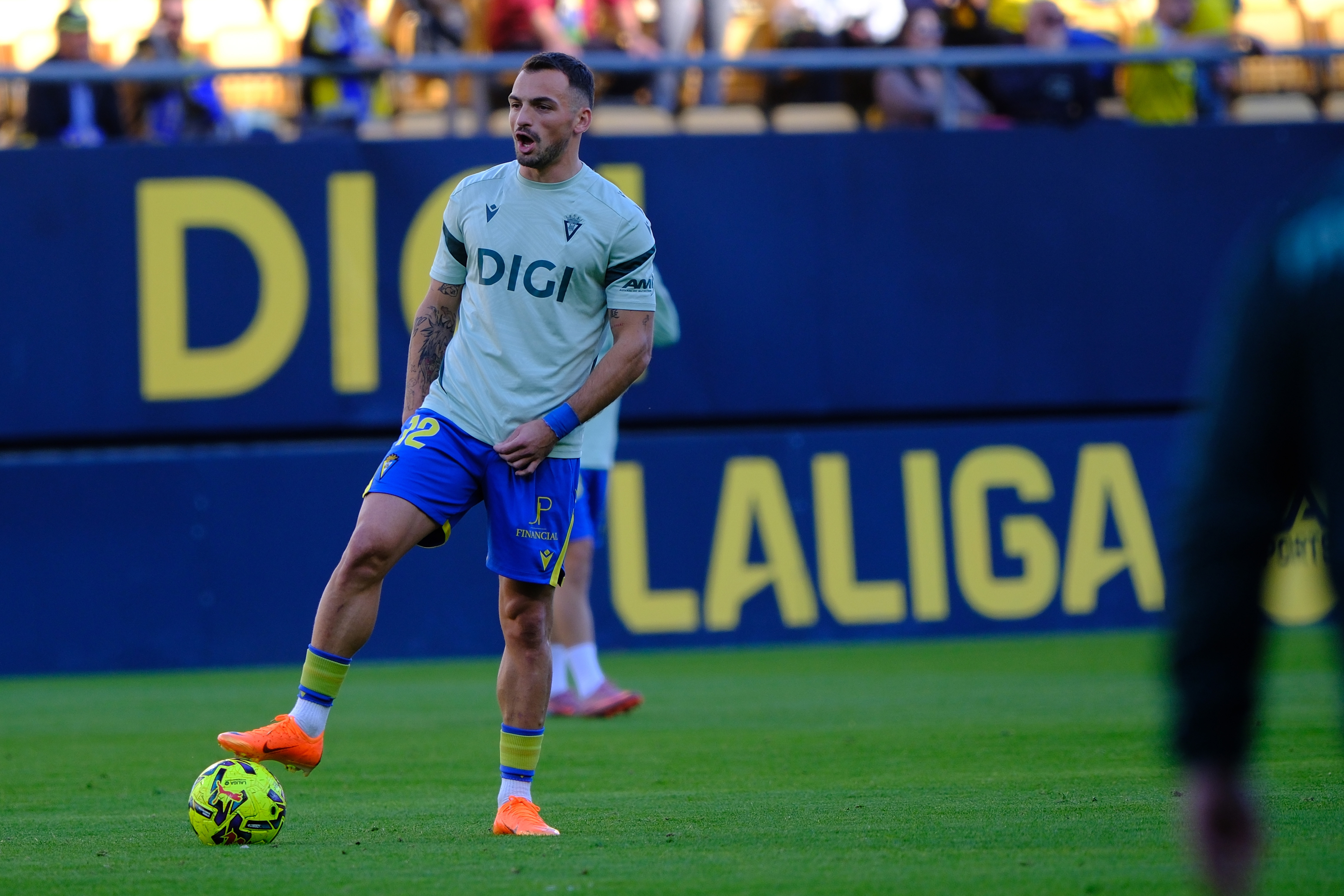

Personal information
- Date of birth: 29 November 1999 (age 26)
- Place of birth: Kutaisi, Georgia
- Height: 1.83 m (6 ft 0 in)
- Position: Winger

Team information
- Current team: Cádiz
- Number: 12

Youth career
- 2010–2018: Saburtalo

Senior career*
Years	Team	Apps	(Gls)
2019–2025	Iberia 1999	154	(43)
2023–2024	→ ViOn Zlaté Moravce (loan)	11	(1)
2025–	Cádiz	18	(6)

International career^{‡}
2019–2020	Georgia U21	4	(0)
2025–	Georgia	1	(0)
- * Club domestic league appearances and goals as of 27 May 2026 ‡ National team caps and goals as of 15 November 2025

Iuri Tabatadze (Georgian: იური ტაბატაძე; born 29 November 1999) is a Georgian professional footballer who plays as a right winger for Segunda División club Cádiz and the Georgia national team.

Tabatadze is the winner of the Erovnuli Liga and Supercup. He has also won the Georgian Cup three times and played for a national youth team.

== Club career ==
=== Iberia 1999 ===
Tabatadze entered a football school in Tbilisi at the age of 7 before joining Saburtalo four years later. He made his debut for the senior team as a second-half substitute in a 3–0 home win over Dila on 20 August 2019.

Tabatadze opened his goal-scoring account in his very first full-time appearance for the team in which Saburtalo beat Locomotive 4–0 the next month. Following a 3–1 win in a cup final over the same opponents on 9 December 2019, Tabatadze won the first trophy of his career.

In 2021, he netted a winner in another cup final as Saburtalo prevailed over Samgurali. The team secured the 3rd cup title two years later with Tabatadze taking part in all five ties.

Tabatadze scored his first goal in a UEFA club competition in 2022. He equalized against Romanian club FCSB to give Saburtalo an aggregate lead, but his team conceded two late goals and crashed out of the 2nd round of UEFA Conference League.

In January 2024, Tabatadze was among three Saburtalo players loaned to Slovak side ViOn Zlaté Moravce until the end of June. After his return to Saburtalo, now renamed as Iberia 1999, he won the first league title. In a final game of the season, Tabatadze featured in a Liga 2/3 play-off tie and helped the reserve team gain promotion to the 2nd division.

In early 2025, Tabatadze topped the leading goalscorers' chart with five goals after the first part of the four-phase Erovnuli Liga season was completed and received the Player of the Month award from Georgian media outlet LaGazzetta for his performance in April 2025.

=== Cádiz ===
On 27 August 2025, Spanish Segunda División side Cádiz announced the signing of Tabatadze on a three-year contract. Four days later, he came off the bench in the 86th minute against Albacete and scored an injury-time goal, helping his team to snatch a 2–1 win. A week later, Tabatadze scored a brace in a 3–3 draw at Real Sociedad, becoming the first debutant of the team in XXI century to amass three goals in two initial games.

In early January 2026, he netted two more goals to help Cadiz pick up four more points, but sustained a knee injury requiring surgery, which saw him out of action for the rest of this season. Tabatadze made 20 appearances for the team, scoring six times.

== International ==
Tabatadze was called up to the U21 team for its 2021 UEFA European Championship qualifying campaign. He made his first appearance for the team in a 3–2 loss to France on 15 November 2019. Later, Tabatadze played three more official games.

In November 2025, Tabatadze was called up to the senior national team for 2026 FIFA World Cup qualification matches against Spain and Bulgaria.

== Career statistics ==
As of 18 January 2026

Appearances and goals by club, season and competition
Club	Season	League			National cup		European		Other		Total	
Club	Season	Division	Apps	Goals	Apps	Goals	Apps	Goals	Apps	Goals	Apps	Goals
Saburtalo / Iberia 1999	2019	Erovnuli Liga	8	2	2	0	1 (Note: Appearance(s) in UEFA Champions League)	0	—		11	2
Saburtalo / Iberia 1999	2020	Erovnuli Liga	14	2	1	0	1 (Note: Appearance(s) in UEFA Europa League)	0	1 (Note: Appearance(s) in Georgian Super Cup)	0	17	2
Saburtalo / Iberia 1999	2021	Erovnuli Liga	35	9	5	3	—		—		40	12
Saburtalo / Iberia 1999	2022	Erovnuli Liga	34	8	3	2	4 (Note: Appearances(s) in UEFA Conference League)	1	1	0	42	11
Saburtalo / Iberia 1999	2023	Erovnuli Liga	26	8	5	2	—		—		31	10
Saburtalo / Iberia 1999	2024	Erovnuli Liga	17	3	1	0	4	0	2	0	22	3
Saburtalo / Iberia 1999	2025	Erovnuli Liga	20	11	1	1	4 (Note: Two appearances in UEFA Champions League, two appearances in UEFA Conference League)	0	1	1	26	13
Saburtalo / Iberia 1999	Total		154	43	18	8	14	1	5	1	191	53
ViOn Zlaté Moravce (loan)	2023–24	Slovak Super Liga	11	1	—		—		—		11	1
Iberia 1999 B	2024	Liga 3	—		—		—		1 (Note: Appearance in Liga 2/3 playoffs)	0	1	0
Cádiz	2025–26	Segunda División	18	6	2	0	—		—		20	6
Career total			183	50	20	8	14	1	6	1	222	60

== Honours ==
Saburtalo / Iberia 1999

- Erovnuli Liga: 2024
- Georgian Cup: 2019, 2021, 2023
- Georgian Super Cup: 2020
