= William Møller =

Danish footballer

Personal information
- Full name: William Allin Møller
- Date of birth: 10 March 1998 (age 28)
- Place of birth: Ølgod, Denmark
- Height: 1.93 m (6 ft 4 in)
- Position: Forward

Youth career
- Esbjerg fB

Senior career*
Years	Team	Apps	(Gls)
2017–2019	Esbjerg fB	30	(2)
2019	Sydvest 05	15	(3)
2020–2021	Preußen Münster	7	(1)
- * Club domestic league appearances and goals

William Allin Møller (born 10 March 1998) is a Danish retired football player.

== Club career ==
He made his Danish Superliga debut for Esbjerg fB on 13 August 2018 in a game against SønderjyskE. He left Esbjerg at the end of the 2018/19 season.

On 1 August 2019, Møller joined Danish 2nd Division club FC Sydvest 05.

On 12 October 2020 he signed with fourth-tier German club Preußen Münster. After one season in Germany, 23-year old Møller announced his retirement on 8 June 2021, because he wanted to join the military.
