= Emil Scheel =

Danish footballer (born 1990)

Personal information
- Full name: Emil Scheel
- Date of birth: 18 March 1990 (age 36)
- Place of birth: Hellerup, Denmark
- Height: 1.85 m (6 ft 1 in)
- Position: Midfielder

Youth career
- ?–2010: Lyngby

Senior career*
Years	Team	Apps	(Gls)
2010–2013	AGF	25	(0)
2013–2017	Silkeborg	130	(27)
2017–2018	SønderjyskE	25	(0)
2018–2021	Viborg	25	(5)
- * Club domestic league appearances and goals

Emil Scheel (born 18 March 1990) is a Danish retired professional footballer who played as a midfielder.

== Career ==
Scheel started his career at Lyngby BK, but soon made the switch to AGF, because he was studying in Aarhus, though only playing for the AGF reserves. In the winter of 2011 he became a permanent part of the AGF first-team and got his debut at home against FC Fredericia on 21–4–2011. On 7 August 2013 he signed a 2-year contract with Silkeborg IF.

Scheel signed with SønderjyskE on 7 January 2017, starting from the summer 2017.

On 3 August 2021, 31-year old Scheel announced his retirement from football due to a knee injury. Scheel have 103 appearances in the Danish Superliga with 8 goals to follow.
