= Tobias Damsgaard =

Danish footballer (born 1998)

Personal information
- Date of birth: 3 August 1998 (age 28)
- Place of birth: Aarhus, Denmark
- Height: 1.85 m (6 ft 1 in)
- Position: Right-back

Youth career
- Aarhus Fremad
- SønderjyskE
- –2018: Randers

Senior career*
Years	Team	Apps	(Gls)
2017–2020	Randers	24	(0)
2020	→ Vendsyssel (loan)	15	(0)
2020–2022	Vendsyssel	18	(0)
2022	Phönix Lübeck	2	(0)
2023	Thisted	13	(1)
- * Club domestic league appearances and goals as of 23 April 2024

Tobias Damsgaard (born 3 August 1998) is a Danish retired footballer.

== Career ==
=== Club career ===
Born in Aarhus, Damsgaard began playing youth football for Aarhus Fremad before playing a year for SønderjyskE while attending efterskole. At under-17 level, he joined the Randers FC youth sector.

On transfer deadline day, 31 January 2020, Damsgaard was loaned out to Vendsyssel FF for the rest of the season. Vendsyssel FF confirmed on 18 May 2020, that they had bought Damsgaard free of his contract and he would join the club permanently on 1 July 2020. On 22 July 2020 Vendsyssel announced, that Damsgaard had signed permanently for the club on a three-year deal. On 19 August 2022 Vendsyssel confirmed, that Damsgaard's contract had been terminated, as he had signed with German Regionalliga side 1. FC Phönix Lübeck.

At the end of December 2022, Damsgaard returned to Denmark, signing with 2nd Division side Thisted FC.

On 8 2024, Damsgaard announced that he retired from football due to injuries.
