= Christian Overby =

Danish footballer (born 1985)

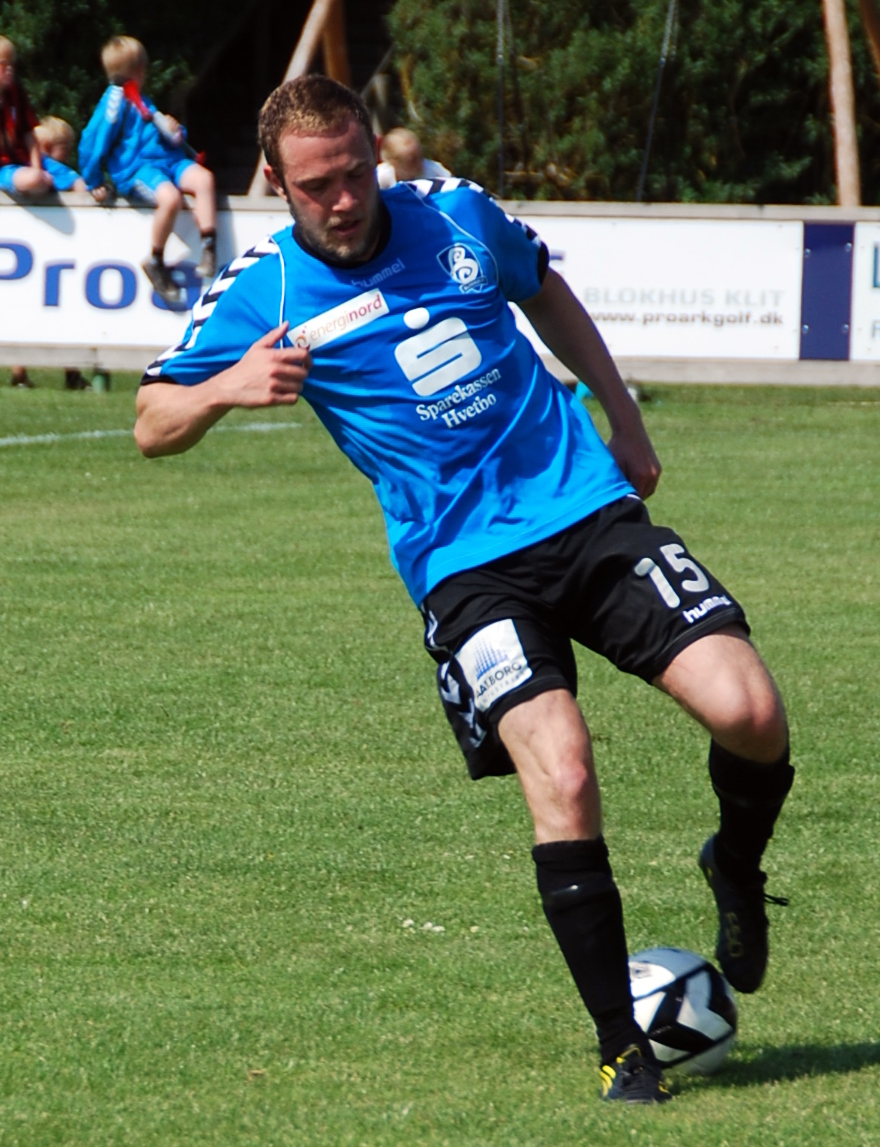
- Christian Overby, June 2011 (Photo: Lars Schmidt)

Personal information
- Date of birth: August 23, 1985 (age 41)
- Place of birth: Thorning, Denmark
- Height: 1.79 m (5 ft 10 in)
- Position: Midfielder

Youth career
- Herning Fremad
- Midtjylland

Senior career*
Years	Team	Apps	(Gls)
2006–2007	Viborg	1	(0)
2008–2009	Hobro		
2009–2012	Blokhus	53	(5)
2012–2018	Vendsyssel	183	(12)
2018–2020	HB Køge	56	(1)
2020	Slagelse	11	(0)
2020–2022	Dalum	4	(0)
2022	Kerteminde BK		

Managerial career
- 2020–2022: Dalum IF (player-assistant)
- * Club domestic league appearances and goals

Christian Overby (born 23 August 1985) is a Danish professional football midfielder who plays as a midfielder.
