= 2018 UEFA European Under-19 Championship qualification =

Tournament details
- Dates: Qualifying round: 3 October – 14 November 2017; Elite round: 21–27 March 2018
- Teams: 54 (from 1 confederation)

Tournament statistics
- Matches played: 120
- Goals scored: 425 (3.54 per match)
- Top scorer(s): (Norway) Erling Haaland (9 goals)

The 2018 UEFA European Under-19 Championship qualifying competition was a men's under-19 football competition that determined the seven teams joining the automatically qualified hosts Finland in the 2018 UEFA European Under-19 Championship final tournament.

Apart from Finland, all remaining 54 UEFA member national teams entered the qualifying competition (including Kosovo who entered for the first time). Players born on or after 1 January 1999 were eligible to participate.

== Format ==
The qualifying competition consisted of two rounds:

- Qualifying round: Apart from Spain and Portugal, which received byes to the elite round as the teams with the highest seeding coefficient, the remaining 52 teams were drawn into 13 groups of four teams. Each group was played in single round-robin format at one of the teams selected as hosts after the draw. The 13 group winners and the 13 runners-up advanced to the elite round.
- Elite round: The 28 teams were drawn into seven groups of four teams. Each group was played in single round-robin format at one of the teams selected as hosts after the draw. The seven group winners qualified for the final tournament.

The schedule of each mini-tournament was as follows (Regulations Article 19.04):

Matchday	Matches
Matchday 1	1 v 4, 3 v 2
Rest days (2 days)	—
Matchday 2	1 v 3, 2 v 4
Rest days (2 days)	—
Matchday 3	2 v 1, 4 v 3

=== Tiebreakers ===
In the qualifying round and elite round, teams were ranked according to points (3 points for a win, 1 point for a draw, 0 points for a loss), and if tied on points, the following tiebreaking criteria were applied, in the order given, to determine the rankings (Regulations Articles 14.01 and 14.02):

1. Points in head-to-head matches among tied teams;
2. Goal difference in head-to-head matches among tied teams;
3. Goals scored in head-to-head matches among tied teams;
4. If more than two teams were tied, and after applying all head-to-head criteria above, a subset of teams were still tied, all head-to-head criteria above were reapplied exclusively to this subset of teams;
5. Goal difference in all group matches;
6. Goals scored in all group matches;
7. Penalty shoot-out if only two teams had the same number of points, and they met in the last round of the group and are tied after applying all criteria above (not used if more than two teams had the same number of points, or if their rankings were not relevant for qualification for the next stage);
8. Disciplinary points (red card = 3 points, yellow card = 1 point, expulsion for two yellow cards in one match = 3 points);
9. UEFA coefficient for the qualifying round draw;
10. Drawing of lots.

== Qualifying round ==
=== Draw ===
The draw for the qualifying round was held on 13 December 2016, 10:00 CET (UTC+1), at the UEFA headquarters in Nyon, Switzerland.

The teams were seeded according to their coefficient ranking, calculated based on the following:

- 2014 UEFA European Under-19 Championship final tournament and qualifying competition (qualifying round and elite round)
- 2015 UEFA European Under-19 Championship final tournament and qualifying competition (qualifying round and elite round)
- 2016 UEFA European Under-19 Championship final tournament and qualifying competition (qualifying round and elite round)

Each group contained one team from Pot A, one team from Pot B, one team from Pot C, and one team from Pot D. For political reasons, Azerbaijan and Armenia, Serbia and Kosovo, and Bosnia and Herzegovina and Kosovo could not be drawn in the same group.

Final tournament hosts
Team	Coeff	Rank
**Finland**	2.333	—

Bye to elite round
Team	Coeff	Rank
Spain	11.333	1
**Portugal**	11.167	2

Teams entering qualifying round

Pot A
Team	Coeff	Rank
Austria	10.500	3
Germany	9.500	4
**England**	9.167	5
**France**	9.000	6
**Ukraine**	8.833	7
Russia	8.833	8
Serbia	8.500	9
Netherlands	8.333	10
**Italy**	7.333	11
Belgium	7.167	12
Czech Republic	7.000	13
Croatia	7.000	14
**Turkey**	6.667	15

Pot B
Team	Coeff	Rank
Israel	6.667	16
Montenegro	6.500	17
Georgia	6.333	18
Denmark	6.000	19
Sweden	5.833	20
Slovakia	5.833	21
Switzerland	5.667	22
Scotland	5.333	23
Greece	5.167	24
Republic of Ireland	5.000	25
Poland	4.667	26
Slovenia	4.333	27
Bulgaria	4.167	28

Pot C
Team	Coeff	Rank
**Norway**	4.167	29
Wales	3.833	30
Lithuania	3.667	31
Bosnia and Herzegovina	3.667	32
Romania	3.333	33
Hungary	3.333	34
Macedonia	3.333	35
Luxembourg	2.667	36
Estonia	2.667	37
Latvia	2.667	38
Iceland	2.500	39
Northern Ireland	2.500	40
Azerbaijan	2.500	41

Pot D
Team	Coeff	Rank
Cyprus	2.500	42
Armenia	2.333	43
Belarus	1.667	44
Albania	1.667	45
Malta	1.333	46
Moldova	1.000	47
Andorra	0.333	48
Liechtenstein	0.333	49
Faroe Islands	0.333	50
Gibraltar	0.333	51
Kazakhstan	0.333	52
San Marino	0.000	53
Kosovo	—	54

Notes

- Teams marked in **bold** qualified for the final tournament.

=== Groups ===
The qualifying round had to be played by 19 November 2017, and on the following FIFA International Match Calendar dates unless all four teams agreed to play on another date:

- 28 August – 5 September 2017
- 2–10 October 2017
- 6–14 November 2017

Times up to 28 October 2017 are CEST (UTC+2), thereafter times are CET (UTC+1).

==== Group 1 ====
Pos	Team	Pld	W	D	L	GF	GA	GD	Pts	Qualification
1	Denmark	3	3	0	0	11	3	+8	**9**	Elite round
2	Latvia	3	1	1	1	5	2	+3	**4**	Elite round
3	Croatia (H)	3	1	1	1	5	5	0	**4**	
4	San Marino	3	0	0	3	0	11	−11	**0**	

Source: UEFA
Rules for classification: Qualification tiebreakers
(H) Hosts
8 November 2017
12:00

Croatia	3–0	San Marino
Kulenović 13', 20'; Nejašmić 38'	Report

Stadion Valbruna, Rovinj
Attendance: 70
Referee: Zaven Hovhannisyan (Armenia)
8 November 2017
14:00

Latvia	1–2	Denmark
Grīnbergs 3'	Report	Poulsen 25'; Odgaard 29'

Stadion Kunfin, Rovinj
Attendance: 75
Referee: Georgios Kominis (Greece)

11 November 2017
12:00

Denmark	4–0	San Marino
Wind 2'; Frisoni 18' (o.g.); Mølgaard Jørgensen 51'; Odgaard 71'	Report

Stadion Kunfin, Rovinj
Attendance: 75
Referee: Zaven Hovhannisyan (Armenia)
11 November 2017
14:00

Croatia	0–0	Latvia
	Report

Stadion Valbruna, Rovinj
Attendance: 80
Referee: Donald Robertson (Scotland)

14 November 2017
14:00

Denmark	5–2	Croatia
Poulsen 10', 47'; Wind 73' (pen.), 90'; Roerslev 79'	Report	Javorčić 61'; Špikić 63'

Stadion Kunfin, Rovinj
Attendance: 130
Referee: Georgios Kominis (Greece)
14 November 2017
14:00

San Marino	0–4	Latvia
	Report	Tobers 45+1'; Samoilovs 55'; Regža 62'; Puriņš 73'

Stadion Valbruna, Rovinj
Attendance: 50
Referee: Donald Robertson (Scotland)

==== Group 2 ====
Pos	Team	Pld	W	D	L	GF	GA	GD	Pts	Qualification
1	Germany	3	3	0	0	14	2	+12	**9**	Elite round
2	Poland (H)	3	2	0	1	5	3	+2	**6**	Elite round
3	Northern Ireland	3	0	1	2	2	9	−7	**1**	
4	Belarus	3	0	1	2	1	8	−7	**1**	

Source: UEFA
Rules for classification: Qualification tiebreakers
(H) Hosts
4 October 2017
12:00

Germany	5–1	Belarus
Havertz 17', 57', 64' (pen.), 90+1' (pen.); Maier 86'	Report	Khlebosolov 59'

Stadion Ernesta Pohla, Zabrze
Referee: Enea Jorgji (Albania)
4 October 2017
16:00

Northern Ireland	1–2	Poland
Amos 63'	Report	Łyszczarz 74'; Stasiak 84'

Stadion Piast, Gliwice
Referee: Ville Nevalainen (Finland)

7 October 2017
12:00

Germany	7–1	Northern Ireland
Akkaynak 15'; Schreck 61'; Beste 67'; Havertz 81' (pen.); Wintzheimer 88', 90+1'; Otto 90+2'	Report	Toal 22'

Stadion Piast, Gliwice
Referee: Dumitri Muntean (Moldova)
7 October 2017
16:00

Poland	3–0	Belarus
Drawz 23'; Malkevich 39' (o.g.); Łyszczarz 48'	Report

Stadion Slaski, Chorzów
Referee: Enea Jorgji (Albania)

10 October 2017
18:00

Poland	0–2	Germany
	Report	Beste 68'; Maier 81'

Stadion Ernesta Pohla, Zabrze
Referee: Ville Nevalainen (Finland)
10 October 2017
18:00

Belarus	0–0	Northern Ireland
	Report

Stadion Slaski, Chorzów
Referee: Dumitri Muntean (Moldova)

==== Group 3 ====
Pos	Team	Pld	W	D	L	GF	GA	GD	Pts	Qualification
1	Czech Republic	3	3	0	0	11	0	+11	**9**	Elite round
2	Scotland	3	1	1	1	6	5	+1	**4**	Elite round
3	Armenia	3	0	2	1	5	10	−5	**2**	
4	Luxembourg (H)	3	0	1	2	3	10	−7	**1**	

Source: UEFA
Rules for classification: Qualification tiebreakers
(H) Hosts
8 November 2017
17:00

Czech Republic	5–0	Armenia
Graiciar 16' (pen.); Růsek 39', 70'; Khachumyan 54' (o.g.); Žitný 83'	Report

Terrain Poetz, Wiltz
Referee: Irfan Peljto (Bosnia and Herzegovina)
8 November 2017
19:00

Luxembourg	1–3	Scotland
Schaus 47'	Report	Duffy 73'; Hornby 86'; Aitchison 90+6'

Stade Alphonse Theis, Hesperange
Referee: Mario Zebec (Croatia)

11 November 2017
17:00

Scotland	3–3	Armenia
Johnston 47', 69' (pen.); Aitchison 64' (pen.)	Report	Bichakhchyan 11', 55'; Melkonyan 78'

Stade Alphonse Theis, Hesperange
Referee: Mario Zebec (Croatia)
11 November 2017
19:00

Czech Republic	5–0	Luxembourg
Sedláček 24', 28', 84' (pen.); Sadílek 41' (pen.); Růsek 45'	Report

Stade Émile Mayrisch, Esch-sur-Alzette
Referee: Boris Marhefka (Slovakia)

14 November 2017
19:00

Scotland	0–1	Czech Republic
	Report	Krejčí 87'

Stade Émile Mayrisch, Esch-sur-Alzette
Referee: Irfan Peljto (Bosnia and Herzegovina)
14 November 2017
19:00

Armenia	2–2	Luxembourg
Harutyunyan 7'; Bichakhchyan 64'	Report	Thill 53'; D'Anzico 73'

Terrain Poetz, Wiltz
Referee: Boris Marhefka (Slovakia)

==== Group 4 ====
Pos	Team	Pld	W	D	L	GF	GA	GD	Pts	Qualification
1	Netherlands (H)	3	2	1	0	7	2	+5	**7**	Elite round
2	Hungary	3	2	0	1	7	4	+3	**6**	Elite round
3	Slovenia	3	1	1	1	8	4	+4	**4**	
4	Malta	3	0	0	3	1	13	−12	**0**	

Source: UEFA
Rules for classification: Qualification tiebreakers
(H) Hosts
4 October 2017
16:00

Netherlands	3–0	Malta
Kadioglu 24', 25'; Piroe 87' (pen.)	Report

Juliana Sportpark, 's-Gravenzande
Referee: Jørgen Burchardt (Denmark)
4 October 2017
19:00

Hungary	2–1	Slovenia
Szabo 58'; Lustyik 90'	Report	Celar 84' (pen.)

Sportpark Ter Specke, Lisse
Referee: Sergey Ivanov (Russia)

7 October 2017
13:00

Slovenia	5–0	Malta
Celar 14'; Horvat 16', 27'; Čerin 21'; Drkušič 32'	Report

Juliana Sportpark, 's-Gravenzande
Referee: Jørgen Burchardt (Denmark)
7 October 2017
16:00

Netherlands	2–0	Hungary
Piroe 25'; Malen 82'	Report

Sportpark Ter Specke, Lisse
Referee: Alper Ulusoy (Turkey)

10 October 2017
18:00

Slovenia	2–2	Netherlands
Zec 21'; Celar 87' (pen.)	Report	Kadioglu 81'; Malen 90+5'

Juliana Sportpark, 's-Gravenzande
Referee: Sergey Ivanov (Russia)
10 October 2017
18:00

Malta	1–5	Hungary
Borg 34'	Report	Kundrák 16'; Bévárdi 54' (pen.), 62' (pen.); Torvund 66', 82'

Sportpark Ter Specke, Lisse
Referee: Alper Ulusoy (Turkey)

==== Group 5 ====
Pos	Team	Pld	W	D	L	GF	GA	GD	Pts	Qualification
1	Macedonia (H)	3	3	0	0	10	2	+8	**9**	Elite round
2	Belgium	3	2	0	1	9	5	+4	**6**	Elite round
3	Switzerland	3	1	0	2	9	8	+1	**3**	
4	Liechtenstein	3	0	0	3	1	14	−13	**0**	

Source: UEFA
Rules for classification: Qualification tiebreakers
(H) Hosts
8 November 2017
13:00

Belgium	3–0	Liechtenstein
Trésor 4'; Boonen 44'; Corryn 49'	Report

Boris Trajkovski Stadium, Skopje
Referee: Giorgi Kruashvili (Georgia)
8 November 2017
13:00

Macedonia	2–1	Switzerland
Trajanovski 56'; Atanasov 61' (pen.)	Report	Ugrinic 33'

Training Centre Petar Miloševski, Skopje
Referee: Roi Reinshreiber (Israel)

11 November 2017
13:00

Belgium	1–2	Macedonia
Foulon 10'	Report	Elmas 24'; Atanasov 87' (pen.)

Training Centre Petar Miloševski, Skopje
Referee: Aleksandrs Anufrijevs (Latvia)
11 November 2017
13:00

Switzerland	5–1	Liechtenstein
Asllani 63'; Müller 71'; Zeqiri 76'; Burkart 78'; Bajrami 82' (pen.)	Report	Frick 56' (pen.)

Boris Trajkovski Stadium, Skopje
Referee: Giorgi Kruashvili (Georgia)

14 November 2017
13:00

Switzerland	3–5	Belgium
Zeqiri 37'; Bajrami 72' (pen.), 78'	Report	Trésor 11', 59'; Delcroix 12'; Verlinden 39'; Amuzu 52'

Boris Trajkovski Stadium, Skopje
Referee: Roi Reinshreiber (Israel)
14 November 2017
13:00

Liechtenstein	0–6	Macedonia
	Report	Churlinov 3'; Kolevski 7'; Mitrovski 25', 54', 73'; Miovski 62'

Training Centre Petar Miloševski, Skopje
Referee: Aleksandrs Anufrijevs (Latvia)

==== Group 6 ====
Pos	Team	Pld	W	D	L	GF	GA	GD	Pts	Qualification
1	Austria (H)	3	3	0	0	5	0	+5	**9**	Elite round
2	Kosovo	3	2	0	1	5	2	+3	**6**	Elite round
3	Israel	3	1	0	2	2	4	−2	**3**	
4	Lithuania	3	0	0	3	0	6	−6	**0**	

Source: UEFA
Rules for classification: Qualification tiebreakers
(H) Hosts
3 October 2017
14:00

Austria	1–0	Kosovo
Lema 56'	Report

Waldstadion Mittersill, Mittersill
Referee: Oleksandr Derdo (Ukraine)
3 October 2017
17:00

Lithuania	0–1	Israel
	Report	Shua 3'

Sportplatz Bürgerau, Saalfelden
Referee: Petr Ardeleánu (Czech Republic)

6 October 2017
13:30

Austria	2–0	Lithuania
Baumgartner 2' (pen.); Arase 35'	Report

Steinbergstadion, Leogang
Referee: Horatiu Fesnic (Romania)
6 October 2017
16:30

Israel	1–2	Kosovo
Almog 32'	Report	Kryeziu 41', 44'

Waldstadion Mittersill, Mittersill
Referee: Oleksandr Derdo (Ukraine)

9 October 2017
14:00

Israel	0–2	Austria
	Report	Arase 73'; Meister 85'

Steinbergstadion, Leogang
Referee: Petr Ardeleánu (Czech Republic)
9 October 2017
14:00

Kosovo	3–0	Lithuania
Lumi 27', 48' (pen.); Limani 50'	Report

Sportplatz Bürgerau, Saalfelden
Referee: Horatiu Fesnic (Romania)

==== Group 7 ====
Pos	Team	Pld	W	D	L	GF	GA	GD	Pts	Qualification
1	Republic of Ireland (H)	3	2	1	0	7	1	+6	**7**	Elite round
2	Serbia	3	2	0	1	6	3	+3	**6**	Elite round
3	Cyprus	3	1	0	2	2	7	−5	**3**	
4	Azerbaijan	3	0	1	2	2	6	−4	**1**	

Source: UEFA
Rules for classification: Qualification tiebreakers
(H) Hosts
4 October 2017
16:00

Azerbaijan	0–0	Republic of Ireland
	Report

Waterford Regional Sports Centre, Waterford
Referee: Alain Durieux (Luxembourg)
4 October 2017
20:00

Serbia	1–0	Cyprus
S. Jovanović 16'	Report

Ferrycarrig Park, Crossabeg
Referee: Nikola Popov (Bulgaria)

7 October 2017
16:00

Serbia	4–1	Azerbaijan
S. Jovanović 36'; Đ. Jovanović 52'; Terzić 73'; Maksimović 83'	Report	Haziyev 90' (pen.)

Ferrycarrig Park, Crossabeg
Referee: Ferenc Karakó (Hungary)
7 October 2017
20:00

Republic of Ireland	5–0	Cyprus
Afolabi 12', 67'; Molumby 15', 24' (pen.), 31'	Report

Waterford Regional Sports Centre, Waterford
Referee: Alain Durieux (Luxembourg)

10 October 2017
14:00

Republic of Ireland	2–1	Serbia
O'Connor 59'; Farrugia 70'	Report	Ilić 29'

Waterford Regional Sports Centre, Waterford
Referee: Nikola Popov (Bulgaria)
10 October 2017
14:00

Cyprus	2–1	Azerbaijan
Louka 61' (pen.); Roles 70' (pen.)	Report	Haziyev 90+2'

Ferrycarrig Park, Crossabeg
Referee: Ferenc Karakó (Hungary)

==== Group 8 ====
Pos	Team	Pld	W	D	L	GF	GA	GD	Pts	Qualification
1	England	3	3	0	0	9	1	+8	**9**	Elite round
2	Bulgaria (H)	3	2	0	1	4	2	+2	**6**	Elite round
3	Iceland	3	1	0	2	4	5	−1	**3**	
4	Faroe Islands	3	0	0	3	1	10	−9	**0**	

Source: UEFA
Rules for classification: Qualification tiebreakers
(H) Hosts
8 November 2017
13:30

Iceland	1–2	Bulgaria
Finnsson 88' (pen.)	Report	T. Ivanov 78'; S. Ivanov 83'

Hadzhi Dimitar Stadium, Sliven
Referee: Markus Hameter (Austria)
8 November 2017
17:30

England	6–0	Faroe Islands
Nketiah 23', 58', 77' (pen.), 90'; Embleton 62'; Brereton 85'	Report

Trace Arena, Stara Zagora
Referee: Paul Mclaughlin (Ireland)

11 November 2017
13:30

Bulgaria	2–0	Faroe Islands
Hristov 46'; Krastev 59'	Report

Hadzhi Dimitar Stadium, Sliven
Referee: Paul Mclaughlin (Ireland)
11 November 2017
17:30

England	2–1	Iceland
Mount 70'; Nketiah 83'	Report	Hafsteinsson 82'

Trace Arena, Stara Zagora
Referee: Peter Kralović (Slovakia)

14 November 2017
13:30

Bulgaria	0–1	England
	Report	Sancho 11'

Trace Arena, Stara Zagora
Referee: Peter Kralović (Slovakia)
14 November 2017
13:30

Faroe Islands	1–2	Iceland
Giessing 79' (pen.)	Report	Kristinsson 53'; Ljubicic 69'

Hadzhi Dimitar Stadium, Sliven
Referee: Markus Hameter (Austria)

==== Group 9 ====
Pos	Team	Pld	W	D	L	GF	GA	GD	Pts	Qualification
1	Italy	3	3	0	0	9	3	+6	**9**	Elite round
2	Sweden (H)	3	2	0	1	9	3	+6	**6**	Elite round
3	Moldova	3	1	0	2	3	7	−4	**3**	
4	Estonia	3	0	0	3	1	9	−8	**0**	

Source: UEFA
Rules for classification: Qualification tiebreakers
(H) Hosts
4 October 2017
17:00

Italy	4–0	Moldova
Zaniolo 19', 53'; Melegoni 23'; Pinamonti 57'	Report

Vapenvallen, Huskvarna
Referee: João Pinheiro (Portugal)
4 October 2017
19:00

Estonia	0–4	Sweden
	Report	Edqvist 8'; Colley 31'; Bergqvist 46', 70'

Stadsparksvallen, Jönköping
Referee: Robert Madley (England)

7 October 2017
13:00

Italy	2–1	Estonia
Pinamonti 52'; Capone 88'	Report	Sorga 26'

Stadsparksvallen, Jönköping
Referee: Rade Obrenovic (Slovenia)
7 October 2017
16:00

Sweden	3–0	Moldova
Bergqvist 25'; Chiperi 49' (o.g.); Titi 73'	Report

Vapenvallen, Huskvarna
Referee: João Pinheiro (Portugal)

10 October 2017
18:00

Sweden	2–3	Italy
Edqvist 46'; Marklund 90'	Report	Pinamonti 19'; Gabbia 45+1', 59'

Stadsparksvallen, Jönköping
Referee: Robert Madley (England)
10 October 2017
18:00

Moldova	3–0	Estonia
Furtună 2'; Nihaev 80'; Postica 85'	Report

Vapenvallen, Huskvarna
Referee: Rade Obrenovic (Slovenia)

==== Group 10 ====
Pos	Team	Pld	W	D	L	GF	GA	GD	Pts	Qualification
1	Romania	3	3	0	0	12	2	+10	**9**	Elite round
2	Greece (H)	3	2	0	1	8	3	+5	**6**	Elite round
3	Russia	3	1	0	2	8	4	+4	**3**	
4	Gibraltar	3	0	0	3	0	19	−19	**0**	

Source: UEFA
Rules for classification: Qualification tiebreakers
(H) Hosts
8 November 2017
13:00

Russia	6–0	Gibraltar
Utkin 15', 90+1'; Ignatyev 18', 38', 73'; Suleymanov 37'	Report

Pankritio Stadium, Heraklion
Referee: Bryn Markham-Jones (Wales)
8 November 2017
16:00

Romania	2–1	Greece
Moruțan 39'; Sîntean 65'	Report	Douvikas 24'

Theodoros Vardinogiannis Stadium, Heraklion
Referee: Bartosz Frankowski (Poland)

11 November 2017
13:00

Russia	1–2	Romania
Tsypchenko 83'	Report	Moruțan 61'; Mățan 70'

Pankritio Stadium, Heraklion
Referee: Nenad Djokić (Serbia)
11 November 2017
16:15

Greece	5−0	Gibraltar
Douvikas 16', 90+6'; Ntalakouras 37'; Emmanouilidis 41'; Giousis 78'	Report

Pankritio Stadium, Heraklion
Referee: Bryn Markham-Jones (Wales)

14 November 2017
16:00

Greece	2–1	Russia
Siampanis 45+1' (pen.); Emmanouilidis 77'	Report	Tiknizyan 21'

Theodoros Vardinogiannis Stadium, Heraklion
Referee: Bartosz Frankowski (Poland)
14 November 2017
16:00

Gibraltar	0–8	Romania
	Report	Mățan 32', 43' (pen.), 46', 65'; Moldoveanu 49', 80'; Băluță 59'; Micovschi 70'

Pankritio Stadium, Heraklion
Referee: Nenad Djokić (Serbia)

==== Group 11 ====
Pos	Team	Pld	W	D	L	GF	GA	GD	Pts	Qualification
1	France	3	2	1	0	10	2	+8	**7**	Elite round
2	Bosnia and Herzegovina (H)	3	2	0	1	4	3	+1	**6**	Elite round
3	Georgia	3	0	2	1	2	3	−1	**2**	
4	Andorra	3	0	1	2	2	10	−8	**1**	

Source: UEFA
Rules for classification: Qualification tiebreakers
(H) Hosts
8 November 2017
13:00

France	7–0 Awarded	Andorra
Maolida 17', 45'; Cuisance 37'; Youan 42', 78'; Sylla 76'; Zagadou 87'	Report

Novi Gradski Stadion, Ugljevik
Attendance: 1,000
Referee: Tim Marshall (Northern Ireland)

The France v Andorra match was completed with a 7–0 scoreline before a default victory was awarded.

8 November 2017
13:00

Bosnia and Herzegovina	1–0	Georgia
Gazibegović 87'	Report

Stadion Etno Selo Stanišići, Bijeljina
Attendance: 300
Referee: Marius Avram (Romania)

11 November 2017
13:00

France	2–1	Bosnia and Herzegovina
Guitane 14'; Diaby 32'	Report	Dembélé 53' (o.g.)

Stadion Etno Selo Stanišići, Bijeljina
Attendance: 330
Referee: Dennis Higler (Netherlands)
11 November 2017
13:00

Georgia	1–1	Andorra
Ninua 43' (pen.)	Report	Grau 86'

Novi Gradski Stadion, Ugljevik
Attendance: 450
Referee: Tim Marshall (Northern Ireland)

14 November 2017
13:00

Georgia	1–1	France
Kharabadze 64'	Report	Bernede 20'

Stadion Etno Selo Stanišići, Bijeljina
Attendance: 100
Referee: Marius Avram (Romania)
14 November 2017
13:00

Andorra	1–2	Bosnia and Herzegovina
Fernández 55' (pen.)	Report	Ćatić 41'; Čeliković 53' (pen.)

Novi Gradski Stadion, Ugljevik
Attendance: 150
Referee: Dennis Higler (Netherlands)

==== Group 12 ====
Pos	Team	Pld	W	D	L	GF	GA	GD	Pts	Qualification
1	Ukraine	3	3	0	0	7	1	+6	**9**	Elite round
2	Norway	3	2	0	1	11	3	+8	**6**	Elite round
3	Montenegro	3	1	0	2	1	7	−6	**3**	
4	Albania (H)	3	0	0	3	1	9	−8	**0**	

Source: UEFA
Rules for classification: Qualification tiebreakers
(H) Hosts
4 October 2017
12:00

Norway	3–0	Montenegro
Markovic 26'; Haaland 63'; Svendsen 83'	Report

Kamëz Stadium, Kamëz
Referee: Aliyar Aghayev (Azerbaijan)
4 October 2017
14:00

Ukraine	1–0	Albania
Supriaha 30'	Report

Selman Stërmasi Stadium, Tirana
Referee: Anders Poulsen (Denmark)

7 October 2017
12:00

Montenegro	1–0	Albania
Vukotić 70' (pen.)	Report

Selman Stërmasi Stadium, Tirana
Referee: Anders Poulsen (Denmark)
7 October 2017
14:00

Ukraine	2–1	Norway
Faye Lund 16' (o.g.); Supriaha 84'	Report	Haaland 8'

Kamëz Stadium, Kamëz
Referee: Nicolas Rainville (France)

10 October 2017
14:00

Montenegro	0–4	Ukraine
	Report	Buletsa 18'; Kashchuk 68', 81'; Korniienko 85' (pen.)

Kamëz Stadium, Kamëz
Referee: Aliyar Aghayev (Azerbaijan)
10 October 2017
14:00

Albania	1–7	Norway
Burba 12'	Report	Haaland 18', 28'; Markovic 32', 72'; Borchgrevink 44'; Østigård 66'; Pedersen 78'

Selman Stërmasi Stadium, Tirana
Referee: Nicolas Rainville (France)

==== Group 13 ====
Pos	Team	Pld	W	D	L	GF	GA	GD	Pts	Qualification
1	Slovakia	3	2	1	0	5	3	+2	**7**	Elite round
2	Turkey (H)	3	2	0	1	7	4	+3	**6**	Elite round
3	Kazakhstan	3	1	1	1	3	5	−2	**4**	
4	Wales	3	0	0	3	4	7	−3	**0**	

Source: UEFA
Rules for classification: Qualification tiebreakers
(H) Hosts
7 November 2017
11:30

Wales	1–2	Slovakia
Touray 62'	Report	Vician 43'; Kráľovič 76'

Arslan Zeki Demirci Sports Complex – Emir Hotels 2, Manavgat
Attendance: 42
Referee: Alexandre Boucaut (Belgium)
7 November 2017
14:00

Turkey	3–0	Kazakhstan
Engin 29'; Sinik 43'; Yalçın 90+3'	Report

Arslan Zeki Demirci Sports Complex – Emir Hotels 1, Manavgat
Attendance: 65
Referee: Fedayi San (Switzerland)

10 November 2017
11:30

Slovakia	0–0	Kazakhstan
	Report

Arslan Zeki Demirci Sports Complex – Emir Hotels 2, Manavgat
Attendance: 38
Referee: Fedayi San (Switzerland)
10 November 2017
14:00

Turkey	2–1	Wales
Lewis 19' (o.g.); Oktay 67'	Report	Cullen 90' (pen.)

Arslan Zeki Demirci Sports Complex – Emir Hotels 1, Manavgat
Attendance: 81
Referee: Dejan Jakimovski (Macedonia)

13 November 2017
13:00

Slovakia	3–2	Turkey
Grešák 50'; Špyrka 82'; Kapacak 87' (o.g.)	Report	Ömür 67'; Yalçın 68'

Arslan Zeki Demirci Sports Complex – Emir Hotels 1, Manavgat
Attendance: 48
Referee: Alexandre Boucaut (Belgium)
13 November 2017
13:00

Kazakhstan	3–2	Wales
Zhakypbayev 45+2', 69'; Pairuz 76'	Report	Spruce 11'; Cullen 82' (pen.)

Arslan Zeki Demirci Sports Complex – Emir Hotels 2, Manavgat
Attendance: 30
Referee: Dejan Jakimovski (Macedonia)

== Elite round ==
=== Draw ===
The draw for the elite round was held on 6 December 2017, 11:00 CET (UTC+1), at the UEFA headquarters in Nyon, Switzerland.

The teams were seeded according to their results in the qualifying round. Spain and Portugal, which received byes to the elite round, were automatically seeded into Pot A. Each group contained one team from Pot A, one team from Pot B, one team from Pot C, and one team from Pot D. Teams from the same qualifying round group could not be drawn in the same group.

Pos	Grp	Team	Pld	W	D	L	GF	GA	GD	Pts	Seeding
1	—	Spain	0	0	0	0	0	0	0	0	Pot A
2	—	Portugal	0	0	0	0	0	0	0	0	Pot A
3	2	Germany	3	3	0	0	14	2	+12	9	Pot A
4	3	Czech Republic	3	3	0	0	11	0	+11	9	Pot A
5	10	Romania	3	3	0	0	12	2	+10	9	Pot A
6	1	Denmark	3	3	0	0	11	3	+8	9	Pot A
7	5	Macedonia	3	3	0	0	10	2	+8	9	Pot A
8	8	England	3	3	0	0	9	1	+8	9	Pot B
9	9	Italy	3	3	0	0	9	3	+6	9	Pot B
10	12	Ukraine	3	3	0	0	7	1	+6	9	Pot B
11	6	Austria	3	3	0	0	5	0	+5	9	Pot B
12	11	France	3	2	1	0	10	2	+8	7	Pot B
13	7	Republic of Ireland	3	2	1	0	7	1	+6	7	Pot B
14	4	Netherlands	3	2	1	0	7	2	+5	7	Pot B
15	13	Slovakia	3	2	1	0	5	3	+2	7	Pot C
16	12	Norway	3	2	0	1	11	3	+8	6	Pot C
17	9	Sweden	3	2	0	1	9	3	+6	6	Pot C
18	10	Greece	3	2	0	1	8	3	+5	6	Pot C
19	5	Belgium	3	2	0	1	9	5	+4	6	Pot C
20	4	Hungary	3	2	0	1	7	4	+3	6 (Note: Ranked by disciplinary points (Hungary: 6 pts; Turkey: 11 pts).)	Pot C
21	13	Turkey	3	2	0	1	7	4	+3	6	Pot C
22	7	Serbia	3	2	0	1	6	3	+3	6	Pot D
23	6	Kosovo	3	2	0	1	5	2	+3	6	Pot D
24	2	Poland	3	2	0	1	5	3	+2	6	Pot D
25	8	Bulgaria	3	2	0	1	4	2	+2	6	Pot D
26	11	Bosnia and Herzegovina	3	2	0	1	4	3	+1	6	Pot D
27	1	Latvia	3	1	1	1	5	2	+3	4	Pot D
28	3	Scotland	3	1	1	1	6	5	+1	4	Pot D

Source: UEFA
Rules for classification: 1) points; 2) goal difference; 3) goals scored; 4) disciplinary points; 5) coefficient; 6) drawing of lots.

=== Groups ===
The elite round had to be played on the following FIFA International Match Calendar dates unless all four teams agreed to play on another date:

- 19–27 March 2018

Times up to 24 March 2018 are CET (UTC+1), thereafter times are CEST (UTC+2).

==== Group 1 ====
Pos	Team	Pld	W	D	L	GF	GA	GD	Pts	Qualification
1	Norway	3	2	0	1	11	12	−1	6 (Note: Head-to-head result: Germany 2–5 Norway.)	Final tournament
2	Germany (H)	3	2	0	1	9	6	+3	6	
3	Scotland	3	1	0	2	6	8	−2	3 (Note: Head-to-head result: Netherlands 0–2 Scotland.)	
4	Netherlands	3	1	0	2	7	7	0	3	

Source: UEFA
Rules for classification: Qualification tiebreakers
(H) Hosts
Notes:
21 March 2018
12:00

Norway	1–6	Netherlands
Borchgrevink 85'	Report	Malen 10', 66'; Van de Looi 24'; Nunnely 69'; Kadioglu 80'; Aboukhlal 90+3'

Wersestadion, Ahlen
Referee: Jonathan Lardot (Belgium)
21 March 2018
18:00

Germany	3–0	Scotland
Wintzheimer 23'; Barjonas 56' (o.g.); Maier 81' (pen.)	Report

Stadion am Bruchbaum, Lippstadt
Referee: Daniele Doveri (Italy)

24 March 2018
12:00

Germany	2–5	Norway
Beste 20'; Akkaynak 63' (pen.)	Report	Haaland 7', 29'; Østigård 35'; Vetlesen 43'; Nordli 71'

Stadion Große Wiese, Arnsberg
Referee: Danilo Grujić (Serbia)
24 March 2018
17:00

Netherlands	0–2	Scotland
	Report	Aitchison 65', 81'

Stadion Große Wiese, Arnsberg
Referee: Jonathan Lardot (Belgium)

27 March 2018
18:00

Netherlands	1–4	Germany
Kökçü 50'	Report	Wintzheimer 31', 70'; Amade 73'; Havertz 89' (pen.)

Wersestadion, Ahlen
Referee: Daniele Doveri (Italy)
27 March 2018
18:00

Scotland	4–5	Norway
McInroy 50'; Middleton 55', 66'; Aitchison 61' (pen.)	Report	Haaland 41' (pen.), 44', 90+1' (pen.); Hauge 82'; Markovic 84'

Stadion am Bruchbaum, Lippstadt
Referee: Danilo Grujić (Serbia)

==== Group 2 ====
Pos	Team	Pld	W	D	L	GF	GA	GD	Pts	Qualification
1	England	3	2	0	1	7	3	+4	6 (Note: Head-to-head result: England 3–0 Latvia.)	Final tournament
2	Latvia	3	2	0	1	5	6	−1	6	
3	Hungary	3	1	0	2	7	10	−3	3 (Note: Head-to-head result: Macedonia 3–4 Hungary.)	
4	Macedonia (H)	3	1	0	2	6	6	0	3	

Source: UEFA
Rules for classification: Qualification tiebreakers
(H) Hosts
Notes:
21 March 2018
14:00

Macedonia	1–2	Latvia
Mitrovski 88' (pen.)	Report	Samoilovs 42', 56'

Training Centre Petar Miloševski, Skopje
Attendance: 600
Referee: Karim Abed (France)
21 March 2018
14:00

Hungary	1–4	England
Bévárdi 39'	Report	Mount 48'; Nelson 54', 86'; Sancho 87'

Philip II Arena, Skopje
Attendance: 50
Referee: Christian Dingert (Germany)

24 March 2018
14:00

Macedonia	3–4	Hungary
Kolevski 12', 64'; Mitrovski 45+2'	Report	Mocsi 4'; Schön 36'; Lustyik 67' (pen.); Bévárdi 82'

Training Centre Petar Miloševski, Skopje
Attendance: 270
Referee: Yaroslav Kozyk (Ukraine)
24 March 2018
14:00

England	3–0	Latvia
Mount 22'; Nketiah 52'; Hirst 82'	Report

Philip II Arena, Skopje
Attendance: 75
Referee: Karim Abed (France)

27 March 2018
14:00

England	0–2	Macedonia
	Report	Atanasov 3'; Mitrovski 90+1'

Training Centre Petar Miloševski, Skopje
Attendance: 350
Referee: Christian Dingert (Germany)
27 March 2018
14:00

Latvia	3–2	Hungary
Regža 15', 89', 90+1'	Report	Kundrák 55'; Bévárdi 57' (pen.)

Philip II Arena, Skopje
Attendance: 20
Referee: Yaroslav Kozyk (Ukraine)

==== Group 3 ====
Pos	Team	Pld	W	D	L	GF	GA	GD	Pts	Qualification
1	Italy (H)	3	2	1	0	7	4	+3	7	Final tournament
2	Poland	3	1	1	1	6	5	+1	4	
3	Greece	3	1	0	2	4	7	−3	3	
4	Czech Republic	3	0	2	1	3	4	−1	2	

Source: UEFA
Rules for classification: Qualification tiebreakers
(H) Hosts
21 March 2018
12:00

Czech Republic	0–0	Poland
	Report

Stadio Comunale di Cordovado, Cordovado
Referee: Radu Petrescu (Romania)
21 March 2018
15:30

Greece	0–2	Italy
	Report	Scamacca 8', 43'

Stadio Comunale Guido Teghil, Lignano Sabbiadoro
Referee: Paul Tierney (England)

24 March 2018
12:00

Czech Republic	2–3	Greece
Heidenreich 15'; Žitný 69'	Report	Gkargkalatzidis 12'; Douvikas 54', 70'

Stadio Comunale di Cordovado, Cordovado
Referee: João Pinheiro (Portugal)
24 March 2018
15:30

Italy	4–3	Poland
Scamacca 38' (pen.), 50', 65'; Bettella 83'	Report	Kopacz 17', 58'; Walukiewicz 41'

Stadio Comunale Guido Teghil, Lignano Sabbiadoro
Referee: Radu Petrescu (Romania)

27 March 2018
16:30

Italy	1–1	Czech Republic
Brignola 10'	Report	Šípek 85'

Stadio Friuli, Udine
Referee: Paul Tierney (England)
27 March 2018
16:30

Poland	3–1	Greece
Bergier 15'; Moder 73'; Grym 80'	Report	Douvikas 13'

Stadio Comunale Guido Teghil, Lignano Sabbiadoro
Referee: João Pinheiro (Portugal)

==== Group 4 ====
Pos	Team	Pld	W	D	L	GF	GA	GD	Pts	Qualification
1	Ukraine	3	2	1	0	4	2	+2	7	Final tournament
2	Romania (H)	3	2	0	1	7	3	+4	6	
3	Serbia	3	1	0	2	4	8	−4	3	
4	Sweden	3	0	1	2	3	5	−2	1	

Source: UEFA
Rules for classification: Qualification tiebreakers
(H) Hosts
21 March 2018
13:30

Sweden	0–0	Ukraine
	Report

Stadionul Ilie Oană, Ploiești
Referee: Alan Mario Sant (Malta)
21 March 2018
18:30

Romania	4–0	Serbia
Mățan 20', 61'; Moruțan 23'; Băluță 55'	Report

Stadionul Ilie Oană, Ploiești
Referee: Alexander Harkam (Austria)

24 March 2018
14:30

Ukraine	2–1	Serbia
Mykolenko 79'; Safronov 90+1'	Report	Đ. Jovanović 21' (pen.)

Stadionul Ilie Oană, Ploiești
Referee: Alexander Harkam (Austria)
24 March 2018
19:00

Romania	2–1	Sweden
Băluță 33'; Mățan 58'	Report	Bergqvist 4'

Stadionul Ilie Oană, Ploiești
Referee: Alejandro Hernandez (Spain)

27 March 2018
14:00

Serbia	3–2	Sweden
Petrović 17'; Stanojev 19'; Joveljić 80'	Report	Mumbongo 64'; Kulusekvski 89'

Stadionul CNAF, Buftea
Referee: Alan Mario Sant (Malta)
27 March 2018
18:00

Ukraine	2–1	Romania
Safronov 84'; Bondar 90+2'	Report	Moruțan 77'

Stadionul Ilie Oană, Ploiești
Referee: Alejandro Hernandez (Spain)

==== Group 5 ====
Pos	Team	Pld	W	D	L	GF	GA	GD	Pts	Qualification
1	Portugal (H)	3	3	0	0	10	0	+10	9	Final tournament
2	Republic of Ireland	3	1	1	1	4	5	−1	4	
3	Kosovo	3	1	0	2	2	9	−7	3	
4	Slovakia	3	0	1	2	2	4	−2	1	

Source: UEFA
Rules for classification: Qualification tiebreakers
(H) Hosts
21 March 2018
16:00

Slovakia	1–1	Republic of Ireland
Tomič 60'	Report	Connolly 76' (pen.)

Complexo Desportivo Clube de Futebol de Fão, Apúlia e Fão
Referee: Kristo Tohver (Estonia)
21 March 2018
18:00

Portugal	5–0	Kosovo
T. Correia 5'; Gomes 10'; Filipe 52'; Fernandes 90+2'; Djú 90+5'	Report

Estádio do Bessa, Porto
Referee: Anastasios Papapetrou (Greece)

24 March 2018
16:00

Republic of Ireland	3–0	Kosovo
Obafemi 5'; O'Connor 13'; Roache 54'	Report

Estádio dos Arcos, Vila do Conde
Referee: Anastasios Papapetrou (Greece)
24 March 2018
18:00

Portugal	1–0	Slovakia
Filipe 34'	Report

Estádio da Mata Real, Paços de Ferreira
Referee: Jérôme Brisard (France)

27 March 2018
18:00

Republic of Ireland	0–4	Portugal
	Report	Fernandes 10', 81' (pen.); Queirós 42'; P. Correia 73'

Estádio Cidade de Barcelos, Barcelos
Referee: Kristo Tohver (Estonia)
27 March 2018
18:00

Kosovo	2–1	Slovakia
Lumi 29'; Salihu 54'	Report	Brenkus 90'

Estádio Dr. Machado de Matos, Felgueiras
Referee: Jérôme Brisard (France)

==== Group 6 ====
Pos	Team	Pld	W	D	L	GF	GA	GD	Pts	Qualification
1	France	3	3	0	0	9	4	+5	9	Final tournament
2	Spain (H)	3	1	1	1	5	4	+1	4	
3	Belgium	3	1	0	2	4	6	−2	3	
4	Bulgaria	3	0	1	2	0	4	−4	1	

Source: UEFA
Rules for classification: Qualification tiebreakers
(H) Hosts
21 March 2018
12:00

Belgium	2–3	France
Verlinden 7'; Bornauw 47'	Report	Pintor 81', 90+1'; Gouiri 86'

Estadio Municipal Guillermo Amor, Benidorm
Referee: Tihomir Pejin (Croatia)
21 March 2018
18:00

Spain	0–0	Bulgaria
	Report

Estadio Municipal Guillermo Amor, Benidorm
Referee: Marco Di Bello (Italy)

24 March 2018
12:00

France	2–0	Bulgaria
Alioui 26', 79'	Report

Estadio Municipal Guillermo Amor, Benidorm
Referee: Tihomir Pejin (Croatia)
24 March 2018
18:00

Spain	3–0	Belgium
Pozo 45'; Ruiz 55', 64'	Report

Estadio Municipal Guillermo Amor, Benidorm
Referee: Antti Munukka (Finland)

27 March 2018
17:30

France	4–2	Spain
Cuenca 63' (o.g.); Maolida 66'; Gouiri 82'; Diaby 90+1'	Report	Ruiz 52' (pen.); Mboula 88'

Estadio Municipal Guillermo Amor, Benidorm
Referee: Marco Di Bello (Italy)
27 March 2018
17:30

Bulgaria	0–2	Belgium
	Report	Dewaele 58'; Openda 67'

Estadio El Collao, Alcoy
Referee: Antti Munukka (Finland)

==== Group 7 ====
Pos	Team	Pld	W	D	L	GF	GA	GD	Pts	Qualification
1	Turkey	3	2	1	0	5	2	+3	7	Final tournament
2	Denmark (H)	3	1	2	0	6	5	+1	5	
3	Austria	3	1	1	1	5	4	+1	4	
4	Bosnia and Herzegovina	3	0	0	3	3	8	−5	0	

Source: UEFA
Rules for classification: Qualification tiebreakers
(H) Hosts
21 March 2018
15:00

Turkey	2–0	Austria
Oktay 60', 83'	Report

JYSK Park, Silkeborg
Referee: Ricardo de Burgos Bengoetxea (Spain)
21 March 2018
19:00

Denmark	3–2	Bosnia and Herzegovina
Wind 28'; Holse 42'; Odgaard 46'	Report	N. Hadžić 59'; B. Hadžić 79'

JYSK Park, Silkeborg
Referee: Ivaylo Stoyanov (Bulgaria)

24 March 2018
13:00

Austria	3–0	Bosnia and Herzegovina
Meister 28'; Schmid 67'; Baumgartner 69'	Report

JYSK Park, Silkeborg
Referee: Ivaylo Stoyanov (Bulgaria)
24 March 2018
17:00

Denmark	1–1	Turkey
Odgaard 77'	Report	Oktay 41'

JYSK Park, Silkeborg
Referee: Kevin Clancy (Scotland)

27 March 2018
14:00

Austria	2–2	Denmark
Schmid 57'; Arase 82'	Report	Odgaard 31'; Wind 79' (pen.)

JYSK Park, Silkeborg
Referee: Kevin Clancy (Scotland)
27 March 2018
14:00

Bosnia and Herzegovina	1–2	Turkey
Zilić 34'	Report	Yalçın 11'; Oktay 44'

Vorup Stadion, Randers
Referee: Ricardo de Burgos Bengoetxea (Spain)

== Qualified teams ==
The following eight teams qualified for the final tournament.

Team	Qualified as	Qualified on	Previous appearances in Under-19 Euro^{1} only U-19 era (since 2002)
Finland	Hosts	26 January 2015	0 (debut)
Norway	Elite round Group 1 winners	27 March 2018	3 (2002, 2003, 2005)
England	Elite round Group 2 winners	24 March 2018	9 (2002, 2003, 2005, 2008, 2009, 2010, 2012, 2016, **2017**)
Italy	Elite round Group 3 winners	24 March 2018	5 (**2003**, 2004, 2008, 2010, 2016)
Ukraine	Elite round Group 4 winners	27 March 2018	4 (2004, **2009**, 2014, 2015)
Portugal	Elite round Group 5 winners	27 March 2018	9 (2003, 2006, 2007, 2010, 2012, 2013, 2014, 2016, 2017)
France	Elite round Group 6 winners	27 March 2018	9 (2003, **2005**, 2007, 2009, **2010**, 2012, 2013, 2015, **2016**)
Turkey	Elite round Group 7 winners	27 March 2018	5 (2004, 2006, 2009, 2011, 2013)

^{1} Bold indicates champions for that year. Italic indicates hosts for that year.

== Goalscorers ==
9 goals

- (Norway) Erling Haaland

8 goals

- (Romania) Alexandru Mățan

6 goals

- (England) Eddie Nketiah
- (Germany) Kai Havertz
- (Greece) Anastasios Douvikas
- (North Macedonia) Dimitar Mitrovski

5 goals

- (Denmark) Jens Odgaard
- (Denmark) Jonas Wind
- (Germany) Manuel Wintzheimer
- (Hungary) Zsombor Bévárdi
- (Italy) Gianluca Scamacca
- (Scotland) Jack Aitchison
- (Turkey) Muhayer Oktay

4 goals

- (Latvia) Marko Regža
- (Netherlands) Ferdi Kadioglu
- (Netherlands) Donyell Malen
- (Norway) Eman Markovic
- (Romania) Olimpiu Moruțan
- (Sweden) Teddy Bergqvist

3 goals

- (Armenia) Vahan Bichakhchyan
- (Austria) Kelvin Arase
- (Belgium) Mike Trésor
- (Czech Republic) Antonín Růsek
- (Czech Republic) Richard Sedláček
- (Denmark) Andreas Poulsen
- (England) Mason Mount
- (France) Myziane Maolida
- (Germany) Jan-Niklas Beste
- (Germany) Arne Maier
- (Italy) Andrea Pinamonti
- (Latvia) Bogdans Samoilovs
- (North Macedonia) Jani Atanasov
- (North Macedonia) Bojan Kolevski
- (Portugal) Gedson Fernandes
- (Republic of Ireland) Jayson Molumby
- (Romania) Tudor Băluță
- (Russia) Ivan Ignatyev
- (Slovenia) Žan Celar
- (Spain) Abel Ruiz
- (Switzerland) Nedim Bajrami
- (Turkey) Güven Yalçın

2 goals

- (Austria) Christoph Baumgartner
- (Austria) Nicolas Meister
- (Austria) Anthony Schmid
- (Azerbaijan) Bahadur Haziyev
- (Belgium) Thibaud Verlinden
- (Croatia) Sandro Kulenović
- (Czech Republic) Patrik Žitný
- (England) Reiss Nelson
- (England) Jadon Sancho
- (France) Nabil Alioui
- (France) Moussa Diaby
- (France) Amine Gouiri
- (France) Lenny Pintor
- (France) Thody Elie Youan
- (Germany) Atakan Akkaynak
- (Greece) Dimitrios Emmanouilidis
- (Hungary) Norbert Kundrák
- (Hungary) Levente Lustyik
- (Hungary) Alexander Torvund
- (Italy) Matteo Gabbia
- (Italy) Nicolò Zaniolo
- (Kazakhstan) Madi Zhakypbayev
- (Netherlands) Joël Piroe
- (Norway) Christian Borchgrevink
- (Norway) Leo Skiri Østigård
- (Poland) David Kopacz
- (Poland) Adrian Łyszczarz
- (Portugal) João Filipe
- (Republic of Ireland) Jonathan Afolabi
- (Republic of Ireland) Lee O'Connor
- (Romania) Robert Moldoveanu
- (Russia) Daniil Utkin
- (Scotland) Mikey Johnston
- (Scotland) Glenn Middleton
- (Serbia) Đorđe Jovanović
- (Serbia) Strahinja Jovanović
- (Slovenia) Tomi Horvat
- (Sweden) Adrian Edqvist
- (Switzerland) Andi Zeqiri
- (Ukraine) Olexiy Kashchuk
- (Ukraine) Oleksandr Safronov
- (Ukraine) Vladyslav Supriaha
- (Wales) Liam Cullen

1 goal

- (Albania) Klajdi Burba
- (Andorra) Ricard Fernández
- (Andorra) Albert Grau
- (Armenia) Hovhannes Harutyunyan
- (Armenia) Karen Melkonyan
- (Austria) Michael John Lema
- (Belarus) Miroslav Khlebosolov
- (Belgium) Francis Amuzu
- (Belgium) Indy Boonen
- (Belgium) Sebastiaan Bornauw
- (Belgium) Milan Corryn
- (Belgium) Hannes Delcroix
- (Belgium) Sieben Dewaele
- (Belgium) Daam Foulon
- (Belgium) Loïs Openda
- (Bosnia and Herzegovina) Amar Ćatić
- (Bosnia and Herzegovina) Jasmin Čeliković
- (Bosnia and Herzegovina) Jusuf Gazibegović
- (Bosnia and Herzegovina) Benjamin Hadžić
- (Bosnia and Herzegovina) Nedim Hadžić
- (Bosnia and Herzegovina) Enio Zilić
- (Bulgaria) Andrea Hristov
- (Bulgaria) Stanislav Ivanov
- (Bulgaria) Toni Ivanov
- (Bulgaria) Kaloyan Krastev
- (Croatia) Duje Javorčić
- (Croatia) Darko Nejašmić
- (Croatia) Dario Špikić
- (Cyprus) Panagiotis Louka
- (Cyprus) Jack Roles
- (Czech Republic) Martin Graiciar
- (Czech Republic) David Heidenreich
- (Czech Republic) Ladislav Krejčí
- (Czech Republic) Michal Sadílek
- (Czech Republic) Jakub Šípek
- (Denmark) Carl Holse
- (Denmark) Kasper Poul Mølgaard Jørgensen
- (Denmark) Mads Roerslev
- (England) Ben Brereton
- (England) Elliot Embleton
- (England) George Hirst
- (Estonia) Erik Sorga
- (Faroe Islands) Lukas Grenaa Giessing
- (France) Antoine Bernede
- (France) Michaël Cuisance
- (France) Rafik Guitane
- (France) Moussa Sylla
- (France) Dan-Axel Zagadou
- (Georgia (country)) Levan Kharabadze
- (Georgia (country)) Nika Ninua
- (Germany) Alfons Amade
- (Germany) Yari Otto
- (Germany) Sam Schreck
- (Greece) Christos Giousis
- (Greece) Alexandros Gkargkalatzidis
- (Greece) Dimitrios Ntalakouras
- (Greece) Marios Siampanis
- (Hungary) Attila Mocsi
- (Hungary) Szabolcs Schön
- (Hungary) Levente Szabo
- (Iceland) Kolbeinn Finnsson
- (Iceland) Daníel Hafsteinsson
- (Iceland) Kristofer Kristinsson
- (Iceland) Stefan Alexander Ljubicic
- (Israel) Eylon Almog
- (Israel) Yarden Shua
- (Italy) Davide Bettella
- (Italy) Enrico Brignola
- (Italy) Christian Capone
- (Italy) Filippo Melegoni
- (Kazakhstan) Zhanali Pairuz
- (Kosovo) Gentrit Limani
- (Kosovo) Abit Salihu
- (Latvia) Jānis Grīnbergs
- (Latvia) Kristers Aldis Puriņš
- (Latvia) Kristers Tobers
- (Liechtenstein) Noah Frick
- (Luxembourg) Kevin D'Anzico
- (Luxembourg) Yannick Schaus
- (Luxembourg) Vincent Thill
- (North Macedonia) Darko Churlinov
- (North Macedonia) Eljif Elmas
- (North Macedonia) Bojan Miovski
- (North Macedonia) Filip Trajanovski
- (Malta) Andrea Borg
- (Moldova) Denis Furtună
- (Moldova) Vsevolod Nihaev
- (Moldova) Ion Postica
- (Montenegro) Ilija Vukotić
- (Netherlands) Zakaria Aboukhlal
- (Netherlands) Tom van de Looi
- (Netherlands) Orkun Kökçü
- (Netherlands) Ché Nunnely
- (Northern Ireland) Danny Amos
- (Northern Ireland) Eoin Toal
- (Norway) Jens Petter Hauge
- (Norway) Simen Bolkan Nordli
- (Norway) Sebastian Pedersen
- (Norway) Tobias Svendsen
- (Norway) Hugo Vetlesen
- (Poland) Sebastian Bergier
- (Poland) Marco Drawz
- (Poland) Riccardo Grym
- (Poland) Jakub Moder
- (Poland) Aron Stasiak
- (Poland) Sebastian Walukiewicz
- (Portugal) Pedro Correia
- (Portugal) Thierry Correia
- (Portugal) Mesaque Djú
- (Portugal) José Gomes
- (Portugal) Diogo Queirós
- (Republic of Ireland) Aaron Connolly
- (Republic of Ireland) Neil Farrugia
- (Republic of Ireland) Michael Obafemi
- (Republic of Ireland) Rowan Roache
- (Romania) Claudiu Micovschi
- (Romania) Andrei Sîntean
- (Russia) Magomed-Shapi Suleymanov
- (Russia) Nayair Tiknizyan
- (Russia) Dmitri Tsypchenko
- (Scotland) Wallace Duffy
- (Scotland) Fraser Hornby
- (Scotland) Kerr McInroy
- (Serbia) Luka Ilić
- (Serbia) Dejan Joveljić
- (Serbia) Igor Maksimović
- (Serbia) Njegoš Petrović
- (Serbia) Jug Stanojev
- (Serbia) Aleksa Terzić
- (Slovakia) Adam Brenkus
- (Slovakia) Matej Grešák
- (Slovakia) Michal Kráľovič
- (Slovakia) Jozef Špyrka
- (Slovakia) Michal Tomič
- (Slovakia) Martin Vician
- (Slovenia) Adam Gnezda Čerin
- (Slovenia) Vanja Drkušič
- (Slovenia) David Zec
- (Spain) Jordi Mboula
- (Spain) Alejandro Pozo
- (Sweden) Joseph Colley
- (Sweden) Dejan Kulusekvski
- (Sweden) Simon Marklund
- (Sweden) Joel Mumbongo
- (Sweden) Adil Titi
- (Switzerland) Mersim Asllani
- (Switzerland) Nishan Burkart
- (Switzerland) Serge Müller
- (Switzerland) Filip Ugrinic
- (Turkey) Ufukcan Engin
- (Turkey) Abdülkadir Ömür
- (Turkey) Doğukan Sinik
- (Ukraine) Valeriy Bondar
- (Ukraine) Serhiy Buletsa
- (Ukraine) Viktor Korniienko
- (Ukraine) Vitalii Mykolenko
- (Wales) James Alexander Spruce
- (Wales) Momodou Touray

1 own goal

- (Armenia) Albert Khachumyan (against Czech Republic)
- (Belarus) Vladislav Malkevich (against Poland)
- (France) Mahamadou Dembélé (against Bosnia and Herzegovina)
- (Moldova) Igor Chiperi (against Sweden)
- (Norway) Julian Faye Lund (against Ukraine)
- (San Marino) Marco Frisoni (against Denmark)
- (Scotland) Jamie Barjonas (against Germany)
- (Spain) Jorge Cuenca (against France)
- (Turkey) Burak Kapacak (against Slovakia)
- (Wales) Joe Lewis (against Turkey)

Source: UEFA.com
