= Portugal national youth football team =

National association football teams

Portugal
- Nickname(s): A Seleção das Quinas; Esperanças (Hopes)
- Association: Portuguese Football Federation
- Confederation: UEFA (Europe)
- Head coach: Various
- Captain: Various
- FIFA code: POR
First colours	Second colours

The Portugal national youth football teams are the national under-23, under-21, under-20, under-19, under-18, under-17, under-16 and under-15 football teams of Portugal and are controlled by the Portuguese Football Federation. The youth teams of Portugal participate in tournaments sanctioned by both FIFA and UEFA and also participates in world, regional, and local international tournaments.

== Portugal national under-21 squad ==
The following 23 players have been called up for the 2019 UEFA European Under-21 Championship qualification matches against Poland.

Caps and goals are correct as of 20 November 2018 after the game against Poland.

No.	Pos.	Player	Date of birth (age)	Caps	Goals	Club
1	GK	Joel Pereira	28 June 1996 (age 30)	16	0	(Royal Belgian Football Association) Kortrijk
12	GK	João Virgínia	10 October 1999 (age 26)	1	0	(The Football Association) Everton
22	GK	Diogo Costa	19 September 1999 (age 27)	1	0	(Portuguese Football Federation) Porto
2	DF	Fernando Fonseca	14 March 1997 (age 29)	12	0	(Ukrainian Association of Football) Zorya Luhansk
3	DF	Pedro Pereira	22 January 1998 (age 28)	0	0	(Italian Football Federation) Genoa
4	DF	Diogo Leite	23 January 1999 (age 27)	5	0	(Portuguese Football Federation) Porto
5	DF	Yuri Ribeiro	24 January 1997 (age 29)	13	0	(The Football Association) Nottingham Forest
13	DF	Pedro Amaral	25 August 1997 (age 29)	3	0	(Hellenic Football Federation) Panetolikos
14	DF	Ferro	26 April 1997 (age 29)	8	0	(Portuguese Football Federation) Benfica
15	DF	Jorge Fernandes	2 April 1997 (age 29)	9	0	(Portuguese Football Federation) Tondela
24	DF	Ivanildo	26 March 1996 (age 30)	1	0	(Portuguese Football Federation) Moreirense
6	MF	Pêpê	20 June 1997 (age 29)	10	0	(Portuguese Football Federation) Vitória Guimarães
7	MF	André Horta	7 November 1996 (age 29)	9	3	(Portuguese Football Federation) Braga
8	MF	Gedson Fernandes	9 January 1999 (age 27)	2	0	(Portuguese Football Federation) Benfica
10	MF	João Carvalho	9 March 1997 (age 29)	21	6	(The Football Association) Nottingham Forest
21	MF	Mathias Pereira Lage	30 November 1996 (age 29)	3	0	(French Football Federation) Clermont
23	MF	Stephen Eustáquio	21 December 1996 (age 29)	7	0	(Mexican Football Federation) Cruz Azul
18	MF	Xadas	2 December 1997 (age 28)	6	1	(Portuguese Football Federation) Braga
17	MF	Bruno Costa	19 April 1997 (age 29)	3	0	(Portuguese Football Federation) Porto
9	FW	Diogo Jota	4 December 1996 (age 29)	20	8	(The Football Association) Wolverhampton Wanderers
16	FW	Rafael Leão	10 June 1999 (age 27)	5	0	(French Football Federation) Lille
11	FW	Diogo Gonçalves	6 February 1997 (age 29)	13	8	(Portuguese Football Federation) Benfica
20	FW	João Félix	10 November 1999 (age 26)	10	4	(Portuguese Football Federation) Benfica
19	FW	Heriberto Tavares	16 February 1996 (age 30)	9	6	(Portuguese Football Federation) Moreirense

== Portugal national under-20 squad ==
The provisional squad for the 2019 FIFA U-20 World Cup was announced on 10 May 2019.

No.	Pos.	Player	Date of birth (age)	Club
1	GK	Diogo Costa	19 September 1999 (age 27)	(Portuguese Football Federation) FC Porto
2	DF	Diogo Dalot	18 March 1999 (age 27)	(The Football Association) Manchester United
3	DF	Diogo Queirós	5 January 1999 (age 27)	(Portuguese Football Federation) FC Porto
4	DF	Diogo Leite	23 January 1999 (age 27)	(Portuguese Football Federation) FC Porto
5	DF	Rúben Vinagre	9 April 1999 (age 27)	(The Football Association) Wolverhampton
6	MF	Florentino Luís	19 August 1999 (age 27)	(Portuguese Football Federation) Benfica
7	FW	Jota	30 March 1999 (age 27)	(Portuguese Football Federation) Benfica
8	MF	Gedson	9 January 1999 (age 27)	(Portuguese Football Federation) Benfica
9	FW	Rafael Leão	10 June 1999 (age 27)	(French Football Federation) Lille
10	MF	Miguel Luís	27 February 1999 (age 27)	(Portuguese Football Federation) Sporting CP
11	FW	Mesaque Djú	18 March 1999 (age 27)	(The Football Association) West Ham United
12	GK	João Virgínia	10 October 1999 (age 26)	(The Football Association) Everton
13	MF	Nuno Pina	31 March 1999 (age 27)	(Italian Football Federation) Chievo
14	DF	Thierry Correia	9 March 1999 (age 27)	(Portuguese Football Federation) Sporting CP
15	DF	Moura	16 August 1999 (age 27)	(Portuguese Football Federation) Sporting Braga
16	DF	Romain Correia	6 September 1999 (age 27)	(Portuguese Football Federation) Guimarães
17	FW	Trincão	29 December 1999 (age 26)	(Portuguese Football Federation) Sporting Braga
18	FW	Pedro Neto	9 March 2000 (age 26)	(Italian Football Federation) Lazio
19	FW	Pedro Martelo	12 October 1999 (age 26)	(Portuguese Football Federation) Sporting Braga
20	MF	Nuno Santos	2 March 1999 (age 27)	(Portuguese Football Federation) Benfica
21	GK	Luís Maximiano	5 January 1999 (age 27)	(Portuguese Football Federation) Sporting CP

== Portugal national under-19 squad ==
The following players have been called up to participate in the 2018 UEFA European Under-19 Championship.

No.	Pos.	Player	Date of birth (age)	Club
1	GK	Diogo Costa	19 September 1999 (aged 18)	(Portuguese Football Federation) Porto
12	GK	João Virginia	10 October 1999 (aged 18)	(The Football Association) Everton
21	GK	Ricardo Benjamim	11 August 1999 (aged 18)	(Royal Spanish Football Federation) Deportivo de La Coruña
2	DF	David Carmo	19 July 1999 (aged 18)	(Portuguese Football Federation) Braga
3	DF	Diogo Queirós	5 January 1999 (aged 19)	(Portuguese Football Federation) Porto
4	DF	Romain Correia	6 September 1999 (aged 18)	(Portuguese Football Federation) Vitória
5	DF	Rúben Vinagre	9 April 1999 (aged 19)	(The Football Association) Wolves
6	DF	Florentino Luís	19 August 1999 (aged 18)	(Portuguese Football Federation) Benfica
13	DF	Nuno Pina	31 March 1999 (aged 19)	(Swiss Football Association) Sion
14	DF	Thierry Correia	9 March 1999 (aged 19)	(Portuguese Football Federation) Sporting CP
20	MF	Nuno Santos	2 March 1999 (aged 19)	(Portuguese Football Federation) Benfica
16	MF	Diogo Teixeira	20 January 1999 (aged 19)	(Portuguese Football Federation) Rio Ave
19	MF	Elves Baldé	2 October 1999 (aged 18)	(Portuguese Football Federation) Sporting CP
8	MF	Miguel Luís	27 February 1999 (aged 19)	(Portuguese Football Federation) Sporting CP
10	MF	Domingos Quina	18 November 1999 (aged 18)	(The Football Association) West Ham United
15	MF	Francisco Moura	16 August 1999 (aged 18)	(Portuguese Football Federation) Braga
11	FW	Mesaque Djú	18 March 1999 (aged 19)	(Portuguese Football Federation) Benfica
7	FW	João Filipe	30 March 1999 (aged 19)	(Portuguese Football Federation) Benfica
9	FW	José Gomes	8 April 1999 (aged 19)	(Portuguese Football Federation) Benfica
17	FW	Francisco Trincão	29 December 1999 (aged 18)	(Portuguese Football Federation) Braga
18	FW	Pedro Correia	12 October 1999 (aged 18)	(Royal Spanish Football Federation) Deportivo de La Coruña

== Portugal national under-17 squad ==
The following players were selected for:

Competition: 2019 UEFA European Under-17 Championship qualification
Match Dates: 20, 23, 26 March 2019
Opposition: Scotland, Poland, Russia

No.	Pos.	Player	Date of birth (age)	Caps	Goals	Club
1	GK	Samuel Soares	15 June 2002 (aged 16)	8	0	(Portuguese Football Federation) Benfica
2	DF	Tomás Esteves	18 March 2002 (aged 17)		0	(Portuguese Football Federation) Porto
3	DF	Eduardo Quaresma (captain)	2 March 2002 (aged 17)	9	0	(Portuguese Football Federation) Sporting
4	DF	Tomás Araújo	16 May 2002 (aged 16)	13	0	(Portuguese Football Federation) Benfica
5	DF	Rafael Brito	19 January 2002 (aged 17)	9	0	(Portuguese Football Federation) Benfica
6	MF	João Daniel	28 June 2002 (aged 16)	14	0	(Portuguese Football Federation) Sporting
7	FW	Gerson Sousa	10 May 2002 (aged 16)	9	7	(Portuguese Football Federation) Benfica
8	MF	Tiago Ribeiro	14 March 2002 (aged 17)	11	0	(French Football Federation) Monaco
9	FW	Fábio Silva	19 July 2002 (aged 16)	14	3	(Portuguese Football Federation) Porto
10	MF	Paulo Bernardo	24 January 2002 (aged 17)	14	3	(Portuguese Football Federation) Benfica
11	MF	Pedro Brazão	30 December 2002 (aged 16)	11	5	(French Football Federation) Nice
12	GK	Diogo Almeida	30 January 2002 (aged 17)	5	0	(Portuguese Football Federation) Sporting
13	DF	Rodrigo Rêgo	26 March 2002 (aged 17)	26	1	(Portuguese Football Federation) Sporting
14	FW	Filipe Cruz	19 February 2002 (aged 17)	23	1	(Portuguese Football Federation) Benfica
15	MF	Famana Quizera	25 April 2002 (aged 17)	7	4	(German Football Association) Borussia Mönchengladbach
16	MF	Bruno Tavares	16 April 2002 (aged 17)	12	3	(Portuguese Football Federation) Sporting
17	FW	Henrique Pereira	15 February 2002 (aged 17)	10	1	(Portuguese Football Federation) Benfica
18	FW	Tiago Tomás	16 June 2002 (aged 16)	12	5	(Portuguese Football Federation) Sporting
19	MF	Gonçalo Batalha	18 February 2002 (aged 17)	10	2	(Portuguese Football Federation) Sporting
20	MF	Daniel Rodrigues	11 February 2002 (aged 17)	13	3	(Portuguese Football Federation) Sporting

== Honours ==
- Under-20 football team
  - FIFA U-20 World Cup: 1989, 1991
- Under-19 football team
  - UEFA European Under-19 Championship: 2018
- Under-18 football team
  - UEFA European Under-18 Championship: 1961, 1994, 1999
- Under-17 football team
  - FIFA U-17 World Cup: 2025
  - UEFA European Under-17 Championship: 2003, 2016, 2025
- Under-16 football team
  - UEFA European Under-16 Championship: 1989, 1995, 1996, 2000
- Under-15 football team
  - CONCACAF Under-15 Championship: 2019
