= Nicolas Meister =

Nicolas Meister may refer to:

- Nicolas Meister (tennis)
- Nicolas Meister (footballer)

== See also ==
- Nick Meister, Canadian curler
