= Anthony Correia =

Anthony Correia may refer to:

- Anthony Correia (footballer, born 1982), Surinamese footballer
- Anthony Correia (footballer, born 1999), French footballer
