= Sipek =

Sipek is a surname, typically an anglicization or a transliteration of Czech Šípek or Croatian Šipek. Notable people with the surname include:

- Bořek Šípek (1949–2016), Czech architect
- Dick Sipek (1923–2005), American baseball player
- Jakub Šípek (born 1999), Czech footballer
- Miro Sipek (born 1948), Australian rifle shooting coach
- Steve Sipek (1942–2019), American actor
