= Hietalahti Stadium =

Football stadium in Vaasa, Finland

Lemonsoft Stadion
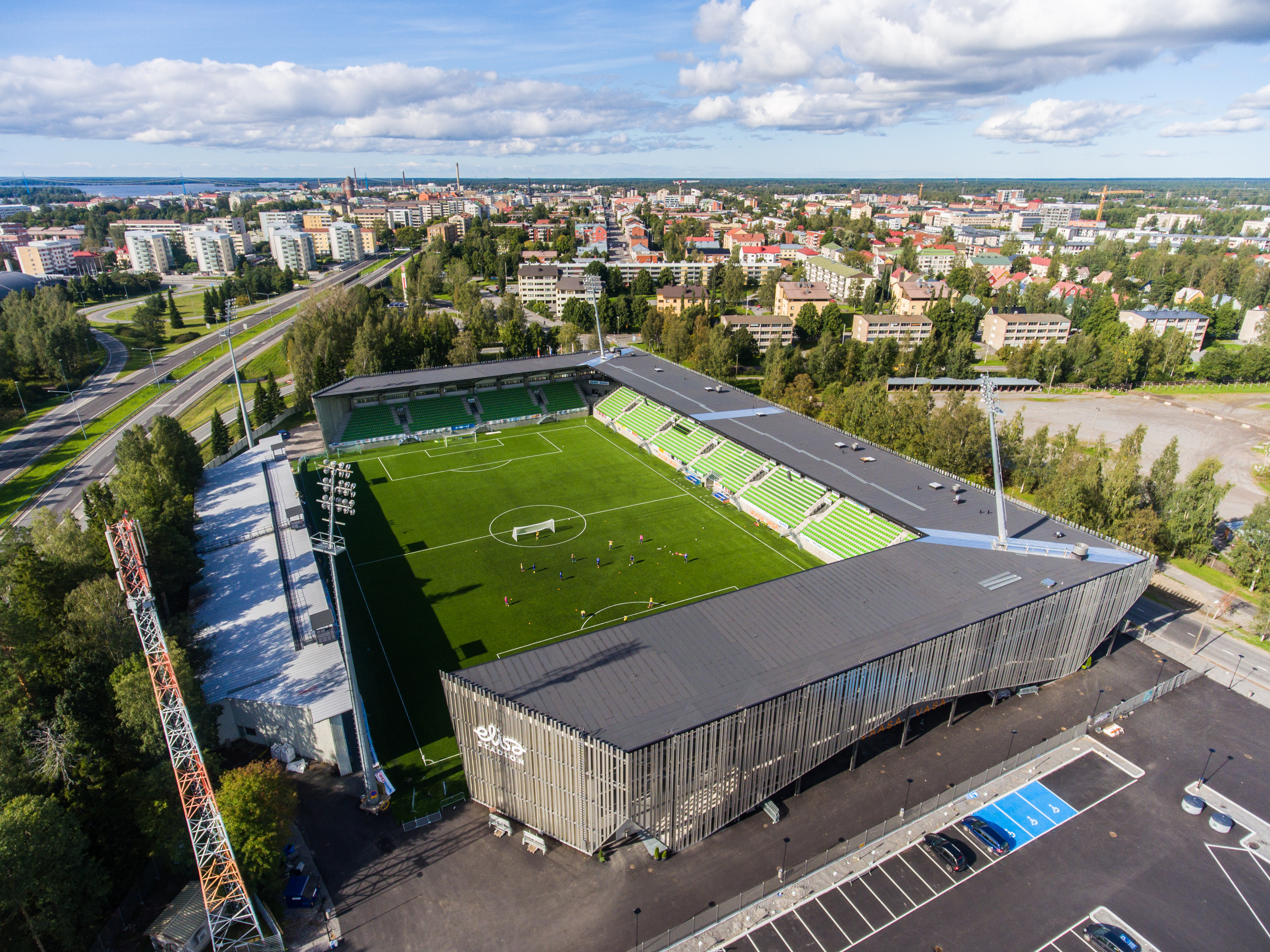
- Interactive map of Lemonsoft Stadion
- Former names: Elisa Stadion, Hietalahti Stadium
- Location: Vaasa, Finland
- Coordinates: 63°05′07″N 21°37′40″E
- Owner: City of Vaasa
- Operator: City of Vaasa
- Capacity: 6,009 (allseater)
- Surface: Artificial turf
- Field size: 107 x 67 m

Construction
- Opened: 1935
- Renovated: 2015–2016
- Cost: 16,5 M €

Tenants
- Vaasan Palloseura, Vasa IFK

Hietalahti Stadium (Finnish: Hietalahden Jalkapallostadion, Swedish: Sandvikens Fotbollsstadion), also known as Lemonsoft Stadion for sponsorship reasons, is a multi-purpose stadium in Vaasa, Finland. It is currently used mostly for football matches and is the home stadium of Vaasan Palloseura. The stadium has a capacity of 6,009 spectators.

The stadium was originally built in 1935. It was expanded to its current capacity in 2015–2016. Prior to its 2022 Lemonsoft sponsorship deal, the name sponsor of the stadium was the Finnish telecommunications company Elisa.

Hietalahti Stadium co-hosted the 2018 UEFA European Under-19 Championship in July 2018.
