= Romain Correia =

Portuguese footballer (born 1999)

Personal information
- Full name: Romain Rodrigues Correia
- Date of birth: 6 September 1999 (age 27)
- Place of birth: Castres, France
- Height: 1.87 m (6 ft 2 in)
- Position: Centre-back

Team information
- Current team: Marítimo
- Number: 44

Youth career
- US Castres
- 2014–2015: US Albi
- 2015–2018: Vitória Guimarães

Senior career*
Years	Team	Apps	(Gls)
2018–2021	Vitória Guimarães B	46	(0)
2021	→ Hércules (loan)	12	(0)
2021–2024	Porto B	67	(3)
2024–	Marítimo	58	(5)

International career
2017	Portugal U18	7	(0)
2017–2018	Portugal U19	16	(0)
2018–2019	Portugal U20	8	(0)
Medal record
Men's football
Representing Portugal
UEFA European U19 Championship
Winner	2018
- * Club domestic league appearances and goals as of 01:27, 22 August 2026 (UTC)

Romain Rodrigues Correia (born 6 September 1999) is a professional footballer who plays as a centre-back for and captains Primeira Liga club Marítimo. Born in France, he represented Portugal at youth level.

== Club career ==
Born in Castres, Occitania to Portuguese parents, Correia joined Vitória de Guimarães' youth system aged 16. He made his senior debut with their reserves on 12 August 2018, playing 90 minutes in the 0–1 home loss against C.D. Cova da Piedade in the LigaPro.

On 19 January 2021, Correia moved to Spanish Segunda División B club Hércules CF on loan. He returned to Portugal in July, signing a three-year contract with FC Porto B. He scored his first goal in the second division on 26 February 2023, in a 2–1 away win over U.D. Vilafranquense.

Correia joined fellow second-tier C.S. Marítimo on 4 July 2024; the duration of the link was not disclosed. In 2025–26, he contributed three goals in 28 games in a return to the Primeira Liga, being included in the team of the season.

== International career ==
Correia was part of the Portugal squad at the 2018 UEFA European Under-19 Championship in Finland, taking part in all five matches for the champions and being included in the Team of the Tournament. He was also selected for the 2019 FIFA U-20 World Cup, a group-stage exit in Poland.

== Personal life ==
Correia's twin brother, Anthony, was also a footballer and a central defender.

== Career statistics ==
As of match played 17 May 2024

Appearances and goals by club, season and competition
Club	Season	League			National cup		League cup		Continental		Total	
Club	Season	Division	Apps	Goals	Apps	Goals	Apps	Goals	Apps	Goals	Apps	Goals
Vitória Guimarães B	2018–19	LigaPro	21	0	—		—		—		21	0
Vitória Guimarães B	2019–20	Campeonato de Portugal	20	0	—		—		—		20	0
Vitória Guimarães B	2020–21	Campeonato de Portugal	5	0	—		—		—		5	0
Vitória Guimarães B	Total		46	0	—		—		—		46	0
Hércules (loan)	2020–21	Segunda División B	12	0	—		—		—		12	0
Porto B	2021–22	Liga Portugal 2	26	0	—		—		—		26	0
Porto B	2022–23	Liga Portugal 2	14	1	—		—		—		14	1
Porto B	2023–24	Liga Portugal 2	27	2	—		—		—		27	2
Porto B	Total		67	3	—		—		—		67	3
Career total			125	3	—		—		—		125	3

== Honours ==
Marítimo

- Liga Portugal 2: 2025–26

Portugal

- UEFA European Under-19 Championship: 2018

Individual

- UEFA European Under-19 Championship Team of the Tournament: 2018
