= 2018 UEFA European Under-19 Championship =

17th edition of the UEFA European Under-19 Championship

Jalkapallon alle 19-vuotiaiden Euroopan-mestaruuskilpailut 2018 (in Finnish) U19-Europamästerskapet i fotboll 2018 (in Swedish)

Tournament details
- Host country: Finland
- Dates: 16–29 July
- Teams: 8 (from 1 confederation)
- Venue: 2 (in 2 host cities)

Final positions
- Champions: Portugal (1st title)
- Runners-up: Italy

Tournament statistics
- Matches played: 16
- Goals scored: 58 (3.63 per match)
- Top scorer(s): (Portugal) Jota (Portugal) Francisco Trincão (5 goals each)

The 2018 UEFA European Under-19 Championship (also known as UEFA Under-19 Euro 2018) was the 17th edition of the UEFA European Under-19 Championship (67th edition if the Under-18 and Junior eras are included), the annual international youth football championship organised by UEFA for the men's under-19 national teams of Europe. Finland hosted the final tournament, between 16 and 29 July, after being selected by UEFA on 26 January 2015. A total of eight teams competed in the tournament, with players born on or after 1 January 1999 eligible to participate.

Same as previous editions held in even-numbered years, the tournament acted as the UEFA qualifiers for the FIFA U-20 World Cup. The top five teams of the tournament qualified for the 2019 FIFA U-20 World Cup in Poland as the UEFA representatives, besides Poland who qualified automatically as hosts.

In the final, 2017 runners-up Portugal beat the 2016 losing finalists Italy 4–3, after extra-time, to win their first title in the under-19 era and their fourth overall. Having won the Under-17 title in 2016, this generation of players became the first to hold the European title in both youth categories. England were the defending champions, but were eliminated by France, finishing third in the group stage. They lost 0–3 to Norway in the play-off round and thus failed to qualify for the 2019 FIFA U-20 World Cup, where they would also defend their title.

== Qualification ==
All 55 UEFA nations entered the competition (including Kosovo who entered for the first time), and with the hosts Finland qualifying automatically, the other 54 teams competed in the qualifying competition to determine the remaining seven spots in the final tournament. The qualifying competition consisted of two rounds: Qualifying round, which took place in autumn 2017, and Elite round, which took place in spring 2018.

=== Qualified teams ===
The following teams qualified for the final tournament.

Note: All appearance statistics include only U-19 era (since 2002).

Team	Method of qualification	Appearance	Last appearance	Previous best performance
Finland	Hosts	1st	—	Debut
Norway	Elite round Group 1 winners	4th	2005 (group stage)	Group stage (2002, 2003, 2005)
England	Elite round Group 2 winners	10th	2017 (champions)	Champions (2017)
Italy	Elite round Group 3 winners	6th	2016 (runners-up)	Champions (2003)
Ukraine	Elite round Group 4 winners	5th	2015 (group stage)	Champions (2009)
Portugal	Elite round Group 5 winners	10th	2017 (runners-up)	Runners-up (2003, 2014, 2017)
France	Elite round Group 6 winners	10th	2016 (champions)	Champions (2005, 2010, 2016)
Turkey	Elite round Group 7 winners	6th	2013 (group stage)	Runners-up (2004)

=== Final draw ===
The final draw was held on 30 May 2018, 12:00 EEST (UTC+3), at the Vaasa City Hall in Vaasa, Finland. The eight teams were drawn into two groups of four teams. There was no seeding, except that hosts Finland were assigned to position A1 in the draw.

== Venues ==
The tournament took place in Vaasa and Seinäjoki.

Seinäjoki	2018 UEFA European Under-19 Championship is located in Finland	Vaasa
OmaSP Stadion	2018 UEFA European Under-19 Championship is located in Finland	Hietalahti Stadium
Capacity: 5,672	2018 UEFA European Under-19 Championship is located in Finland	Capacity: 5,572

== Match officials ==
A total of 6 referees, 8 assistant referees and 2 fourth officials were appointed for the final tournament.

Referees

- (Austria) Manuel Schüttengruber
- (Belgium) Jonathan Lardot
- (Poland) Bartosz Frankowski
- (Scotland) Andrew Dallas
- (Spain) Juan Martínez Munuera
- (Switzerland) Sandro Schärer

Assistant referees

- (Bosnia and Herzegovina) Damir Lazić
- (Croatia) Bojan Zobenica
- (Denmark) Daniel Norgaard
- (Estonia) Aron Härsing
- (Iceland) Bryngeir Valdimarsson
- (Romania) Alexandru Cerei
- (Sweden) Joakim Nilsson
- (Wales) Ian Bird

Fourth officials

- (Finland) Ville Nevalainen
- (Finland) Petri Viljanen

== Squads ==
Each national team submitted a squad of 20 players (Regulations Article 39).

== Group stage ==
The final tournament schedule was confirmed on 5 June 2018.

The group winners and runners-up advanced to the semi-finals and qualified for the 2019 FIFA U-20 World Cup. The third-placed teams entered the FIFA U-20 World Cup play-off.

Tiebreakers

In the group stage, teams were ranked according to points (3 points for a win, 1 point for a draw, 0 points for a loss), and if tied on points, the following tiebreaking criteria were applied, in the order given, to determine the rankings (Regulations Articles 16.01 and 16.02):

1. Points in head-to-head matches among tied teams;
2. Goal difference in head-to-head matches among tied teams;
3. Goals scored in head-to-head matches among tied teams;
4. If more than two teams were tied, and after applying all head-to-head criteria above, a subset of teams were still tied, all head-to-head criteria above were reapplied exclusively to this subset of teams;
5. Goal difference in all group matches;
6. Goals scored in all group matches;
7. Penalty shoot-out if only two teams had the same number of points, and they met in the last round of the group and were tied after applying all criteria above (not used if more than two teams had the same number of points, or if their rankings were not relevant for qualification for the next stage);
8. Disciplinary points (red card = 3 points, yellow card = 1 point, expulsion for two yellow cards in one match = 3 points);
9. UEFA coefficient for the qualifying round draw;
10. Drawing of lots.

All times were local, EEST (UTC+3).

=== Group A ===
Pos	Team	Pld	W	D	L	GF	GA	GD	Pts	Qualification
1	Italy	3	2	1	0	5	3	+2	7	Knockout stage and 2019 FIFA U-20 World Cup
2	Portugal	3	2	0	1	8	4	+4	6	Knockout stage and 2019 FIFA U-20 World Cup
3	Norway	3	1	1	1	5	6	−1	4	FIFA U-20 World Cup play-off
4	Finland (H)	3	0	0	3	2	7	−5	0	

Source: UEFA
Rules for classification: Group stage tiebreakers
(H) Hosts
16 July 2018
15:00

Norway	1–3	Portugal
Markovic 82'	Report	Trincão 24', 90+3'; Luís 41'

Hietalahti Stadium, Vaasa
Referee: Manuel Schüttengruber (Austria)
16 July 2018
20:00

Finland	0–1	Italy
	Report	Zaniolo 43'

Hietalahti Stadium, Vaasa
Referee: Juan Martínez Munuera (Spain)

19 July 2018
18:30

Finland	2–3	Norway
Vertainen 29' (pen.); Ylätupa 53'	Report	Hauge 11'; Botheim 90'; C. Borchgrevink 90+2'

OmaSP Stadion, Seinäjoki
Referee: Jonathan Lardot (Belgium)
19 July 2018
20:30

Portugal	2–3	Italy
Luís 69'; Quina 89'	Report	Capone 53'; Scamacca 78'; Frattesi 84'

Hietalahti Stadium, Vaasa
Referee: Bartosz Frankowski (Poland)

22 July 2018
18:30

Portugal	3–0	Finland
Jota 20'; Gomes 33'; Djú 90+4'	Report

Hietalahti Stadium, Vaasa
Referee: Sandro Schärer (Switzerland)
22 July 2018
18:30

Italy	1–1	Norway
Kean 83'	Report	Haaland 62' (pen.)

OmaSP Stadion, Seinäjoki
Referee: Andrew Dallas (Scotland)

=== Group B ===
Pos	Team	Pld	W	D	L	GF	GA	GD	Pts	Qualification
1	Ukraine	3	2	1	0	4	2	+2	7	Knockout stage and 2019 FIFA U-20 World Cup
2	France	3	2	0	1	11	2	+9	6	Knockout stage and 2019 FIFA U-20 World Cup
3	England	3	1	1	1	4	8	−4	4	FIFA U-20 World Cup play-off
4	Turkey	3	0	0	3	2	9	−7	0	

Source: UEFA
Rules for classification: Group stage tiebreakers
17 July 2018
18:30

Turkey	2–3	England
Yalçın 2'; Güçlü 57'	Report	Tanganga 22'; Brereton 45+2'; Embleton 54'

OmaSP Stadion, Seinäjoki
Referee: Sandro Schärer (Switzerland)
17 July 2018
20:30

France	1–2	Ukraine
Guitane 23'	Report	Tsitaishvili 13'; Buletsa 86'

Hietalahti Stadium, Vaasa
Referee: Andrew Dallas (Scotland)

20 July 2018
18:30

Ukraine	1–1	England
Supriaha 39'	Report	Tavernier 8'

OmaSP Stadion, Seinäjoki
Referee: Manuel Schüttengruber (Austria)
20 July 2018
20:30

Turkey	0–5	France
	Report	Guitane 2'; Gouiri 22', 33'; Diaby 58'; Cuisance 90+2' (pen.)

Hietalahti Stadium, Vaasa
Referee: Juan Martínez Munuera (Spain)

23 July 2018
18:30

Ukraine	1–0	Turkey
Buletsa 8'	Report

OmaSP Stadion, Seinäjoki
Referee: Jonathan Lardot (Belgium)
23 July 2018
18:30

England	0–5	France
	Report	Alioui 28', 56'; Maolida 41'; Gouiri 63', 69'

Hietalahti Stadium, Vaasa
Referee: Bartosz Frankowski (Poland)

== Knockout stage ==
In the knockout stage, extra time and penalty shoot-out were used to decide the winner if necessary.

=== Bracket ===
Semi-finals
26 July – Vaasa
Italy	2
France	0
26 July – Vaasa
Ukraine	0
Portugal	5

Final
29 July – Seinäjoki
Italy	3
Portugal (a.e.t.)	4
World Cup play-off
26 July – Seinäjoki
Norway	3
England	0

=== FIFA U-20 World Cup play-off ===
Winner qualified for 2019 FIFA U-20 World Cup.

26 July 2018
13:00

Norway	3–0	England
Botheim 75'; Markovic 86'; Hauge 89'	Report

OmaSP Stadion, Seinäjoki
Referee: Bartosz Frankowski (Poland)

=== Semi-finals ===
26 July 2018
15:00

Ukraine	0–5	Portugal
	Report	Correia 2'; Jota 19', 21'; Trincão 28', 30'

Hietalahti Stadium, Vaasa
Referee: Manuel Schüttengruber (Austria)

26 July 2018
19:00

Italy	2–0	France
Capone 27'; Kean 30'	Report

Hietalahti Stadium, Vaasa
Referee: Jonathan Lardot (Belgium)

=== Final ===
29 July 2018
19:30

Italy	3–4 (a.e.t.)	Portugal
Kean 75', 76'; Scamacca 107'	Report	Jota 45+1', 104'; Trincão 72'; Correia 109'

OmaSP Stadion, Seinäjoki
Attendance: 5,018
Referee: Juan Martínez Munuera (Spain)

== Qualified teams for FIFA U-20 World Cup ==
The following six teams from UEFA qualify for the 2019 FIFA U-20 World Cup, including Poland which qualified as hosts.

Team	Qualified on	Previous appearances in FIFA U-20 World Cup^{1}
Poland	16 March 2018	4 (1979, 1981, 1983, 2007)
Italy	22 July 2018	6 (1977, 1981, 1987, 2005, 2009, 2017)
Portugal	22 July 2018	11 (1979, **1989**, **1991**, 1993, 1995, 1999, 2007, 2011, 2013, 2015, 2017)
Ukraine	23 July 2018	3 (2001, 2005, 2015)
France	23 July 2018	6 (1977, 1997, 2001, 2011, **2013**, 2017)
Norway	26 July 2018	2 (1989, 1993)

^{1} Bold indicates champions for that year. Italic indicates hosts for that year.

== Goalscorers ==
There were 58 goals scored in 16 matches, for an average of 3.62 goals per match.

5 goals

- (Portugal) Jota
- (Portugal) Francisco Trincão

4 goals

- (France) Amine Gouiri
- (Italy) Moise Kean

2 goals

- (France) Rafik Guitane
- (France) Nabil Alioui
- (Italy) Christian Capone
- (Italy) Gianluca Scamacca
- (Norway) Erik Botheim
- (Norway) Jens Petter Hauge
- (Norway) Eman Markovic
- (Portugal) Miguel Luís
- (Portugal) Pedro Correia
- (Ukraine) Serhiy Buletsa

1 goal

- (England) Ben Brereton
- (England) Elliot Embleton
- (England) Japhet Tanganga
- (England) Marcus Tavernier
- (Finland) Eetu Vertainen
- (Finland) Saku Ylätupa
- (France) Michaël Cuisance
- (France) Moussa Diaby
- (France) Myziane Maolida
- (Italy) Davide Frattesi
- (Italy) Nicolò Zaniolo
- (Norway) Christian Borchgrevink
- (Norway) Erling Haaland
- (Portugal) Mesaque Djú
- (Portugal) José Gomes
- (Portugal) Domingos Quina
- (Turkey) Metehan Güçlü
- (Turkey) Güven Yalçın
- (Ukraine) Vladyslav Supriaha
- (Ukraine) Heorhiy Tsitaishvili

Source: UEFA.com

== Team of the Tournament ==
The UEFA technical observers selected the following 11 players for the team of the tournament (and an additional nine substitutes):

Starting XI:

Goalkeeper

- (Italy) Alessandro Plizzari

Defenders

- (Italy) Raoul Bellanova
- (Portugal) Romain Correia
- (Italy) Davide Bettella
- (Portugal) Rúben Vinagre

Midfielders

- (France) Michaël Cuisance
- (Portugal) Florentino Luís
- (Italy) Sandro Tonali

Wingers

- (Portugal) Jota
- (France) Moussa Diaby

Forward

- (Ukraine) Vladyslav Supriaha

Substitutes:

Goalkeeper

- (France) Yehvann Diouf

Outfield

- (Portugal) Thierry Correia
- (England) Trevoh Chalobah
- (Portugal) Domingos Quina
- (Finland) Saku Ylätupa
- (Italy) Nicolò Zaniolo
- (Ukraine) Serhiy Buletsa
- (Portugal) Francisco Trincão
- (Italy) Moise Kean
