= Adrian Edqvist =

Swedish footballer

Personal information
- Date of birth: 20 May 1999 (age 27)
- Place of birth: Karlskrona, Sweden
- Height: 1.78 m (5 ft 10 in)
- Position: Forward

Team information
- Current team: NSÍ Runavík
- Number: 2

Youth career
- –2006: Nättraby GoIF
- 2006–2012: Las Lagunas
- 2012–2015: Karlskrona AIF
- 2015–2016: Malmö FF
- 2017: Kalmar FF

Senior career*
Years	Team	Apps	(Gls)
2017–2021	Kalmar FF	19	(0)
2019	→ Oskarshamns AIK (loan)	7	(1)
2019–2020	→ Go Ahead Eagles (loan)	20	(2)
2021–2022	Jönköping Södra	51	(6)
2023–2025	Gefle IF	56	(6)
2025–2026	Östersunds FK	26	(0)
2026–	NSÍ Runavík	4	(0)

International career
2015–2016	Sweden U17	10	(1)
2016–2018	Sweden U19	13	(4)
- * Club domestic league appearances and goals as of 2 June 2026

Adrian Edqvist (born 20 May 1999) is a Swedish footballer who plays as a forward for Faroe Islands Premier League club NSÍ Runavík.

== Club career ==
=== Early career ===
Edqvist was born in Karlskrona and started his career in Nättraby GoIF. At the age of seven, the family moved from Blekinge to the Spanish south coast and Edqvist then started playing at AD Las Lagunas, outside Málaga. During the years in Spain he entered Andalusia's national team and was close to a move to the La Liga club Málaga CF shortly before the family returned to Sweden. After returning to Sweden, he joined Karlskrona AIF and in 2015 he joined Malmö FF, who won the battle for his signature over Kalmar FF and the Danish club Brøndby IF. In December 2015, he also went on a trial at Stoke City.

=== Senior career ===
In 2017, Edqvist joined Kalmar FF from Malmö FF where he played at his youth years. He was promoted to the first team squad of Kalmar FF in September 2017. On 11 March 2019, Kalmar FF signed a cooperation agreement Oskarshamns AIK and Edqvist alongside his teammate Alexander Ahl Holmström was loaned out to the club on the same day until 30 November 2019. The deal also made it possible to play in both Kalmar's A team and U21 teams while playing for Oskarshamns AIK.

On 12 July 2019, Edqvist was loaned out to Eerste Divisie club Go Ahead Eagles until June 2020.

On 12 February 2021, he signed a three-year contract with Jönköping. In December 2022, Edqvist joined Gefle IF.

== Career statistics ==
=== Club ===
As of match played 12 April 2025

Appearances and goals by club, season and competition
Club	Season	League			National cup (Note: Includes Svenska Cupen, KNVB Cup)		Other		Total	
Club	Season	Division	Apps	Goals	Apps	Goals	Apps	Goals	Apps	Goals
Kalmar FF	2017	Allsvenskan	3	0	1	2	—		4	2
Kalmar FF	2018	Allsvenskan	8	0	0	0	—		8	0
Kalmar FF	2019	Allsvenskan	2	0	0	0	0	0	2	0
Kalmar FF	2020	Allsvenskan	6	0	1	0	2 (Note: Appearance(s) in Allsvenskan Relegation play-offs)	0	9	0
Kalmar FF	Total		19	0	2	2	2	0	23	2
Oskarshamns AIK (loan)	2019	Ettan	7	1	0	0	0	0	7	1
Go Ahead Eagles (loan)	2019-20	Eerste Divisie	20	2	4	1	—		24	3
Jönköpings Södra	2021	Superettan	29	5	1	0	—		30	5
Jönköpings Södra	2022	Superettan	22	1	1	0	—		23	1
Jönköpings Södra	Total		51	6	2	0	—		53	6
Gefle	2023	Superettan	27	3	4	0	—		31	3
Gefle	2024	Superettan	29	3	1	0	—		30	3
Gefle	Total		56	6	5	0	—		61	6
Östersunds FK	2025	Superettan	3	0	0	0	—		3	0
Career total			156	15	13	3	2	0	171	18
