= Michal Tomič =

Slovak footballer

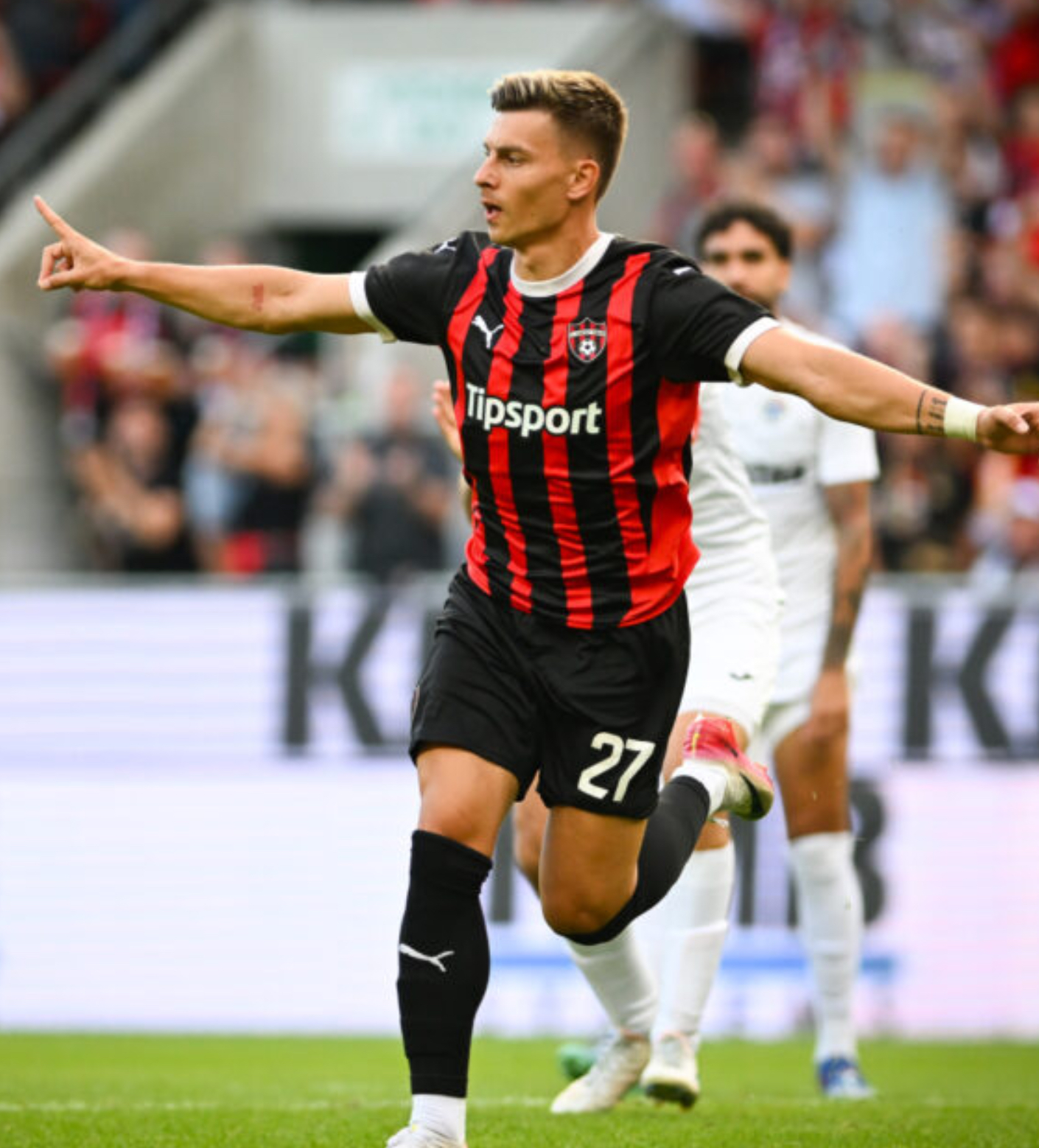
- Tomič celebrating his first goal for Spartak

Personal information
- Date of birth: 30 March 1999 (age 27)
- Place of birth: Myjava, Slovakia
- Height: 1.82 m (6 ft 0 in)
- Positions: Right-back; right winger

Team information
- Current team: Dukla Prague (on loan from Spartak Trnava)
- Number: 37

Youth career
- 2006–2013: Spartak Myjava
- 2013–2015: Senica
- 2016–2017: Sampdoria

Senior career*
Years	Team	Apps	(Gls)
2017–2019	Sampdoria	0	(0)
2018–2019	→ Žilina (loan)	22	(2)
2019–2020	Žilina	12	(1)
2020–2023	Slovácko	54	(1)
2023–2025	Slavia Prague	23	(2)
2023	→ Mladá Boleslav (loan)	9	(1)
2024	→ Bodø/Glimt (loan)	4	(0)
2025	→ Karviná (loan)	6	(2)
2025–	Spartak Trnava	13	(0)
2026–	→ Dukla Prague (loan)	8	(1)

International career^{‡}
2015–2016	Slovakia U17	6	(0)
2018	Slovakia U19	3	(1)
2018	Slovakia U20	3	(0)
2019	Slovakia U21	5	(0)
2023–	Slovakia	5	(0)
- * Club domestic league appearances and goals as of 1 November 2026 ‡ National team caps and goals as of 5 June 2024

Michal Tomič (born 30 March 1999) is a Slovak professional footballer who plays as a defender for Czech club Dukla Prague on loan from Spartak Trnava.

== Club career ==
=== Sampdoria ===
Tomič is a Spartak Myjava graduate. He later played for Senica at youth level and in 2015 transferred to the Sampdoria Genoa academy. He played for the team mainly in the spring. He did not get a chance in the A-team.

=== Žilina ===
On 8 August 2018, it was announced that Tomič would be joining Slovak side MŠK Žilina on a one-year loan. He made his Slovak Super Liga debut for Žilina against DAC Dunajská Streda on 25 August 2018, only to be replaced by Roland Gerebenits minutes before stoppage time, ending in a goalless draw.

Tomič remained in Žilina after the season ended, signing a two-year contract. On 3 August 2019, Tomič scored his first goal of the season in a 2–1 win over AS Trenčín.

=== Slovácko ===
In the summer of 2020, Tomič transferred to Czech club 1. FC Slovácko, where he signed a three-year contract. After recovering from injury, Tomič made his debut for Slovácko on December 16, in a 1–2 loss to Zbrojovka Brno. He played 13 games in the Czech league in his first season.

On May 18, 2022, he played in the Czech Cup final, where his team won 3:1 over Sparta Prague and celebrated winning the cup.

On 13 October 2022, Tomič scored his first goal for the team in a 2–1 win over OGC Nice in the 2022–23 UEFA Conference League group stage. He scored his first league goal on 6 November, in a 1–0 win over Pardubice.

=== Slavia ===
In February 2023, Tomič transferred to Slavia Prague where he signed a contract until 2026. However, he was sent on loan to Mlada Boleslav until the end of the season.

After returning from the loan, Tomič made his debut for Slavia Prague on 6 August 2023 in a 2–1 win over Zlín. He scored his first goal for Slavia on 29 October in a 2–0 win over Bohemians Prague.

On 18 August 2024, Tomič joined Norwegian club Bodø/Glimt on loan deal for rest of 2024, with an option to purchase.

On 3 February 2025, Tomič joined Karviná on loan until the end of the season. He scored a goal and got sent off in his debut for his new club in a 1:1 draw against FK Teplice.

=== Spartak Trnava ===
On 23 June 2025, it was announced that Tomič had joined Slovak First Football League side FC Spartak Trnava, signing on a 3-year contract. He made his debut for the club in the first round of the Europa League qualification in a 1:0 loss to BK Häcken, coming off in the 71” minute for Marek Ujlaky. Tomič scored his first goal for Spartak in a 5:1 win over Hibernians F.C. in the Conference League qualifiers, scoring in the 47” minute, after coming on as a substitute at half time for Libor Holík.

==== Dukla Prague (loan) ====
On 25 August 2026, Tomič joined Czech National Football League club Dukla Prague on a one-year loan deal with an option to make the transfer permanent.

== International career ==
In November 2022, Tomič received his first call-up for the Slovak senior national team nomination as a back-up footballer for two friendly matches against Montenegro and Marek Hamšík's retirement game against Chile. He debuted on 23 March 2023 at Štadión Antona Malatinského in Trnava during the first UEFA Euro 2024 qualifying match against Luxembourg, coming on as a substitute to Peter Pekarík at the 81th, ending in a goalless draw.

== Career statistics ==
=== Club ===
As of 11 July 2025

Club	Season	League			Cup		Continental		Other		Total	
Club	Season	Division	Apps	Goals	Apps	Goals	Apps	Goals	Apps	Goals	Apps	Goals
Žilina (loan)	2018–19	Fortuna Liga	22	2	6	1	—		—		28	3
Žilina	2019–20	Fortuna Liga	12	1	2	0	—		—		14	1
Slovácko	2020–21	Czech First League	13	0	0	0	—		—		13	0
Slovácko	2021–22	Czech First League	29	0	4	0	1	0	—		34	0
Slovácko	2022–23	Czech First League	12	1	2	1	8	1	—		22	3
Slovácko	Total		54	1	6	1	9	1	—		69	3
Mladá Boleslav (loan)	2022–23	Czech First League	9	1	—		—		—		9	1
Spartak Trnava	2025–26	Slovak First League	0+1	0	—		1+2	1	-		—	—
Career total			97	5	14	2	11+2	2	0	0	120	8
