= Anthony Correia (footballer, born 1999) =

French footballer

Personal information
- Full name: Anthony Paulo Rodrigues Correia
- Date of birth: 6 September 1999 (age 27)
- Place of birth: Castres, France
- Height: 1.85 m (6 ft 1 in)
- Position: Centre-back

Team information
- Current team: Académico Viseu
- Number: 41

Youth career
- 2015–2017: Vitória Guimarães
- 2017–2018: Leixões

Senior career*
| Years | Team | Apps | (Gls) |
| 2018–2019 | Leixões | 3 | (0) |
| 2019–2021 | Braga B | 42 | (2) |
| 2021–2022 | Estrela Amadora | 29 | (1) |
| 2022–2023 | Vilafranquense | 31 | (0) |
| 2023–2024 | AVS | 32 | (1) |
| 2024–2025 | Vizela | 29 | (0) |
| 2025– | Académico Viseu | 39 | (3) |
- * Club domestic league appearances and goals as of 14:21, 29 September 2026 (UTC)

Anthony Paulo Rodrigues Correia (born 6 September 1999) is a Portuguese professional footballer who plays as a central defender for Primeira Liga club Académico de Viseu.

== Club career ==
Born in Castres, Occitania to Portuguese parents, Correia finished his development at Leixões. He made his Liga Portugal 2 debut with the club on 6 January 2019, as a last-minute substitute in a 1–0 home win against Covilhã in new manager Jorge Casquilha's first match in charge.

On 8 August 2019, Correia signed for Braga. He was assigned to the reserve team in the third division.

Correia returned to the second tier in summer 2021, agreeing to a two-year contract with Estrela da Amadora. He scored his first goal as a professional on 19 December that year, closing the 2–0 away victory over Penafiel through a penalty kick.

Correia continued to compete in the second division the following seasons, with Vilafranquense, AVS, Vizela and Académico de Viseu. On 14 February 2026, he scored his first career brace to help the latter to defeat Oliveirense 4–1 at home, and dedicated the goals to his former youth teammate (at Leixões) Nassur Bacém, who had died the previous month on the pitch from a heart attack in representation of amateurs Moncarapachense, aged 27; he eventually contributed 32 appearances in a return to the Primeira Liga after a 37-year absence while being named defender of the month twice, and renewed his contract in the process.

== Personal life ==
Correia's twin brother, Romain, was also a footballer and a defender.
