= Aron Stasiak =

Polish footballer

Personal information
- Full name: Aron Stasiak
- Date of birth: 19 February 1999 (age 27)
- Place of birth: Kamień Pomorski, Poland
- Height: 1.83 m (6 ft 0 in)
- Position: Forward

Team information
- Current team: Kluczevia Stargard
- Number: 10

Youth career
- Trójka Węgorzyno
- 2010–2011: Światowid Łobez
- 2011–2012: Salos Szczecin
- 2012–2014: Lech Poznań
- 2014–2015: Pogoń Szczecin

Senior career*
Years	Team	Apps	(Gls)
2015–2024	Pogoń Szczecin II	48	(11)
2017–2024	Pogoń Szczecin	1	(0)
2018	→ Wigry Suwałki (loan)	13	(1)
2019–2021	→ Górnik Łęczna (loan)	53	(6)
2022–2023	→ Olimpia Elbląg (loan)	29	(7)
2023–2024	→ Kotwica Kołobrzeg (loan)	21	(4)
2024–2025	Świt Szczecin	25	(1)
2025–2026	Flota Świnoujście	30	(8)
2026–	Kluczevia Stargard	0	(0)

International career
2017	Poland U19	7	(1)
2019	Poland U20	2	(1)
- * Club domestic league appearances and goals as of 17:52, 5 June 2026 (UTC)

Aron Stasiak (born 19 February 1999) is a Polish professional footballer who plays as a forward for III liga club Kluczevia Stargard.

== Honours ==
Górnik Łęczna

- II liga: 2019–20

Pogoń Szczecin II

- Polish Cup (West Pomerania regionals): 2021–22
