= Ufukcan Engin =

Turkish professional footballer

Personal information
- Date of birth: 8 March 1999 (age 27)
- Place of birth: Çanakkale, Turkey
- Position: Midfielder

Team information
- Current team: Kırıkkale Büyük Anadoluspor
- Number: 8

Youth career
- 2008–2014: Dardanel Spor A.Ş.

Senior career*
Years	Team	Apps	(Gls)
2014–2017	Dardanel Spor	81	(8)
2017	Fortuna Sittard	5	(0)
2018–2020	Istanbulspor	0	(0)
2018–2019	→ Silivrispor (loan)	28	(2)
2019–2020	→ Nazilli Belediyespor (loan)	25	(1)
2020–2021	Nazilli Belediyespor	23	(1)
2021–2022	Belediye Derincespor	6	(0)
2022–	Kırıkkale Büyük Anadoluspor	26	(1)

International career^{‡}
2014	Turkey U15	4	(0)
2014–2015	Turkey U16	13	(0)
2015–2016	Turkey U17	14	(2)
2016	Turkey U18	2	(1)
2017–2018	Turkey U19	6	(1)
- * Club domestic league appearances and goals as of 12 November 2022 ‡ National team caps and goals as of 20 February 2018

Ufukcan Engin (born 8 March 1999) is a Turkish professional footballer who plays as a midfielder for Kırıkkale Büyük Anadoluspor.

== Professional career ==
Engin is a youth product of Dardanel Spor A.Ş. and debuted professionally with them in 2014, and with them became the youngest scorer in the history of professional Turkish football. His goal debut came in a 1-1 TFF Third League tie with Payas Belediyespor 1975 on 18 October 2014, when Engin was 15.

On 12 August 2017, he signed with Fortuna Sittard in the Dutch Eerste Divisie. He made his debut in a 5-1 Eerste Divisie win over Jong PSV on 22 September 2017.
