= Adrian Łyszczarz =

Polish association football player

Personal information
- Full name: Adrian Łyszczarz
- Date of birth: 22 August 1999 (age 27)
- Place of birth: Oleśnica, Poland
- Height: 1.78 m (5 ft 10 in)
- Position: Midfielder

Team information
- Current team: Start Namysłów

Youth career
- 2011–2016: FC Wrocław Academy

Senior career*
Years	Team	Apps	(Gls)
2016–2023	Śląsk Wrocław II	69	(21)
2016–2023	Śląsk Wrocław	56	(6)
2018–2019	→ GKS Katowice (loan)	15	(1)
2023–2024	Resovia	33	(4)
2024–2026	Odra Opole	13	(2)
2026–	Start Namysłów	0	(0)

International career
2016	Poland U18	2	(0)
2017–2018	Poland U19	11	(2)
2018–2019	Poland U20	10	(2)
- * Club domestic league appearances and goals as of 08:27, 27 May 2026 (UTC)

Adrian Łyszczarz (born 22 August 1999) is a Polish professional footballer who plays as a midfielder for IV liga Opole club Start Namysłów.

== Honours ==
Śląsk Wrocław II

- III liga, group III: 2019–20
