= Simon Marklund =

Swedish footballer

Personal information
- Full name: Bo Simon Penny Marklund
- Date of birth: 14 September 1999 (age 27)
- Place of birth: Sweden
- Height: 1.73 m (5 ft 8 in)
- Position: Midfielder

Team information
- Current team: Östersunds FK
- Number: 10

Senior career*
Years	Team	Apps	(Gls)
2015–2018	Åtvidabergs FF	75	(10)
2019–2021	Kongsvinger	47	(6)
2021–2023	Ranheim	69	(4)
2023–	Östersunds FK	103	(17)

International career^{‡}
2016	Sweden U17	9	(1)
2016–2018	Sweden U19	9	(2)
- * Club domestic league appearances and goals as of 11 November 2026 ‡ National team caps and goals as of July 3, 2018

Simon Marklund (born 14 September 1999) is a Swedish footballer who plays as a midfielder for Östersunds FK.
