= Pedro Martelo =

Portuguese footballer (born 1999)

Personal information
- Full name: Pedro Alves Correia
- Date of birth: 12 October 1999 (age 27)
- Place of birth: Évora, Portugal
- Height: 1.90 m (6 ft 3 in)
- Position: Forward

Team information
- Current team: Teuta
- Number: 9

Youth career
- 2007–2012: Lusitano
- 2013–2016: Benfica
- 2016–2018: Deportivo La Coruña

Senior career*
Years	Team	Apps	(Gls)
2017–2020	Deportivo B	41	(8)
2019	→ Braga B (loan)	4	(0)
2020–2022	Paços de Ferreira	0	(0)
2021	→ CD Badajoz (loan)	3	(0)
2021	→ Amora (loan)	7	(1)
2022	→ São João de Ver (loan)	13	(3)
2022–2023	Belenenses	19	(4)
2023	Sligo Rovers	12	(1)
2024–2025	Leça	29	(19)
2025–2026	Oliveirense	31	(6)
2026–	Teuta	5	(2)

International career
2018	Portugal U19	8	(4)
2018–2019	Portugal U20	12	(7)
Medal record
Men's football
Representing Portugal
UEFA European Under-19 Championship
Winner	2018
- * Club domestic league appearances and goals as of 18 September 2026

Pedro Alves Correia (born 12 October 1999), known as Pedro Martelo, is a Portuguese footballer who plays as a striker for Albanian Kategoria Superiore club Teuta.

== Club career ==
Born in Évora, Martelo joined S.L. Benfica's youth setup in 2012, after representing Lusitano G.C. On 30 July 2016, he moved abroad and agreed to a four-year contract with Deportivo de La Coruña.

Martelo made his senior debut with the reserves on 16 April 2017, coming on as a late substitute for Pinchi in a 1–0 Tercera División home win against Céltiga FC; it was his only appearance of the campaign, as his side achieved promotion. He was definitely promoted to the B-side in July 2018, but only featured sparingly.

On 31 January 2019, Martelo joined S.C. Braga on a six-month loan deal, and was assigned to the B-team in LigaPro. He made his professional debut on 19 April, replacing Denisson Silva in a 0–1 away loss against Varzim S.C.

On 26 August 2020, Martelo signed a three-year deal with F.C. Paços de Ferreira.

On 31 January 2021, Martelo moved to Spanish side Badajoz on a loan deal.

On 9 September 2021, Paços de Ferreira loaned Martelo to Liga 3 club Amora.

On 27 January 2022, Paços de Ferreira sent, for the second time that season, Martelo on loan to a Liga 3 club, this time São João de Ver.

On 29 July 2022, it was reported that Martelo had terminated his contract with Paços de Ferreira by mutual agreement.

On 2 August 2022, Martelo signed a one-year contract with recently-promoted to Liga 3 side Belenenses. That season, he helped the club finish runners-up, earning promotion to the Liga Portugal 2.

On 13 July 2023, Irish club Sligo Rovers announced the signing of Martelo on a deal until the end of the 2023 season, with the option to extend the contract for a further year. Two days earlier, the striker had impressed on trial, in a friendly against Celtic B. He was handed the number 9 shirt. He was released by the club at the end of the season, after scoring 1 goal in 12 appearances.

== International career ==
Martelo was part of the Portugal side that won the 2018 UEFA European Under-19 Championship in Finland. He scored in the first two minutes of a 5–0 semi-final win over Ukraine, and the extra-time winner in the 4–3 final victory over Italy.

== Personal life ==
Martelo's father Juary and his cousin Vítor are also footballers. The former played as a defender while the latter plays as a winger, but both only played amateur football throughout their careers.

== Honours ==
Portugal U19

- UEFA European Under-19 Championship: 2018
