= Jakub Šípek =

Czech footballer

Personal information
- Date of birth: 21 February 1999 (age 27)
- Height: 1.80 m (5 ft 11 in)
- Position: Second striker

Youth career
- Hradec Králové

Senior career*
Years	Team	Apps	(Gls)
2017–2021	Hradec Králové	60	(10)
2018	→ Chrudim (loan)	24	(2)
2022–	Schweiggers		

International career^{‡}
2014–2015	Czech Republic U16	15	(3)
2015–2016	Czech Republic U17	12	(0)
2016–2017	Czech Republic U18	13	(2)
2017–2018	Czech Republic U19	9	(2)
2018–2019	Czech Republic U20	6	(1)
2019	Czech Republic U21	1	(0)
- * Club domestic league appearances and goals as of 17 July 2024 ‡ National team caps and goals as of 17 July 2024

Jakub Šípek (born 21 February 1999) is a professional Czech football second striker currently playing for Hradec Králové in the Czech First League.

He made his senior league debut for Hradec Králové on 19 February 2017 in a Czech First League 0–2 home loss to Dukla Prague. He scored his first goal in his second league appearance five days later – a 1–3 away loss at Jihlava.
