= Nicolas Meister (footballer) =

Austrian footballer

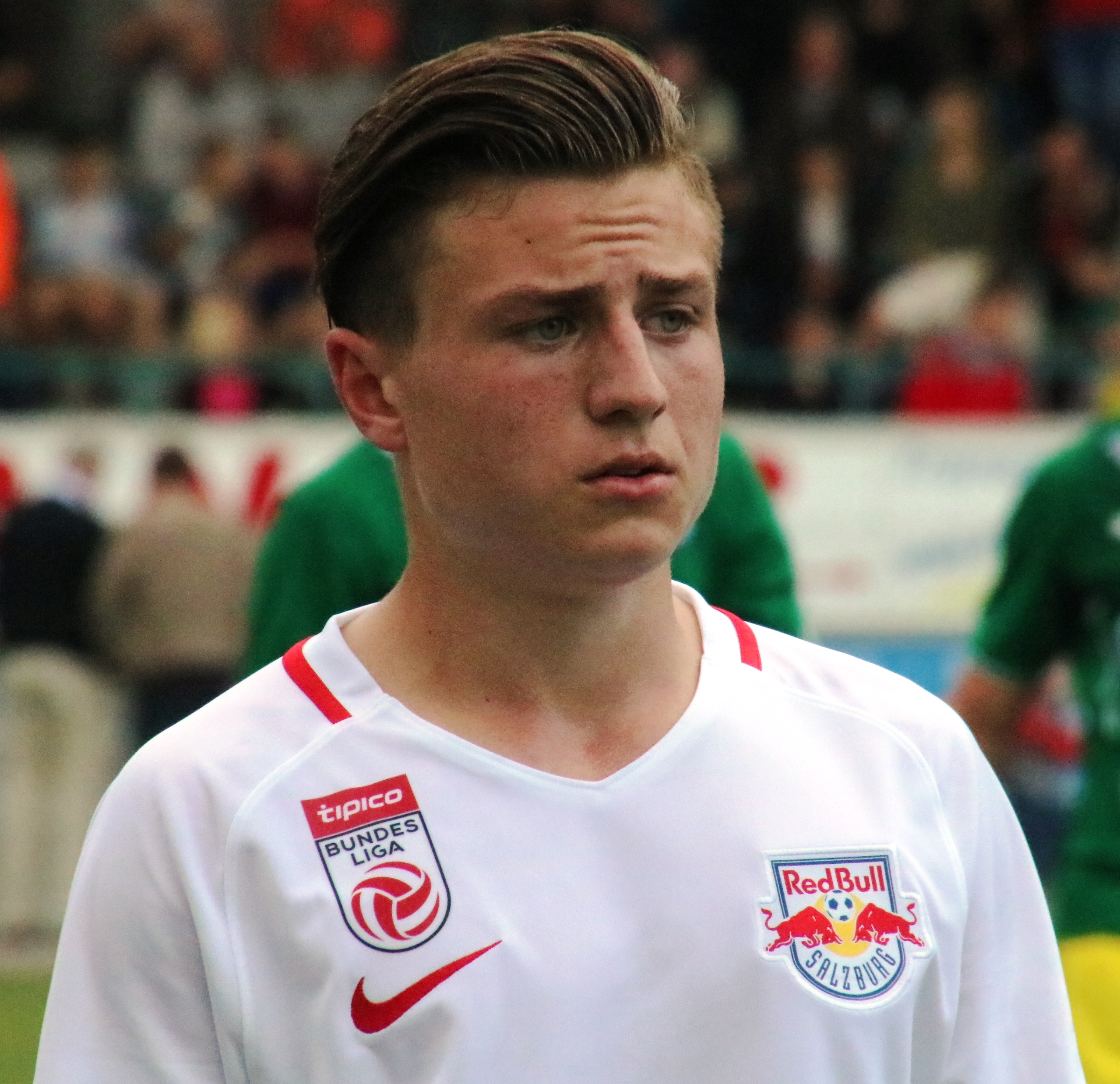

Personal information
- Date of birth: 28 September 1999 (age 27)
- Place of birth: Vienna, Austria
- Height: 1.80 m (5 ft 11 in)
- Position: Forward

Team information
- Current team: FC Marchfeld Donauauen
- Number: 20

Youth career
- 2004–2005: SC Wiener Viktoria
- 2005–2007: L.A. Riverside
- 2007–2012: SK Rapid Wien
- 2012–2013: SC Team Wiener Linien
- 2013–2015: AKA St. Pölten
- 2015–2016: FC Red Bull Salzburg

Senior career*
Years	Team	Apps	(Gls)
2016–2018	FC Liefering	36	(5)
2018–2022	Juniors OÖ	33	(12)
2020–2021	→ SKN St. Pölten (loan)	22	(2)
2021–2022	→ SV Lafnitz (loan)	21	(3)
2022–	FC Marchfeld Donauauen	93	(30)

International career^{‡}
2014	Austria U15	3	(3)
2014–2015	Austria U16	12	(7)
2015–2016	Austria U17	13	(1)
2016	Austria U18	1	(0)
2017–2018	Austria U19	8	(3)
2019	Austria U20	2	(1)
2019–2020	Austria U21	6	(3)
- * Club domestic league appearances and goals as of 28 June 2026 ‡ National team caps and goals as of 8 September 2020 (UTC)

Nicolas Meister (born 28 September 1999) is an Austrian football player who plays for FC Marchfeld Donauauen.

== Club career ==
He made his professional debut in the Austrian Football First League for FC Liefering on 1 November 2016 in a game against SC Austria Lustenau.

On 15 June 2022, Meister joined FC Marchfeld Donauauen.
