= 2017–18 in English football =

Football in England
- Season: 2017–18

Men's football
- Premier League: Manchester City
- Championship: Wolverhampton Wanderers
- League One: Wigan Athletic
- League Two: Accrington Stanley
- National League: Macclesfield Town
- FA Cup: Chelsea
- EFL Trophy: Lincoln City
- EFL Cup: Manchester City
- Community Shield: Arsenal

Women's football
- WSL 1: Chelsea
- WSL 2: Doncaster Rovers Belles
- FA Women's Premier League: Charlton Athletic
- Women's FA Cup: Chelsea
- WSL Cup: Arsenal

The 2017–18 season was the 138th season of competitive association football in England.

== National teams ==
=== England national football team ===
==== Results and fixtures ====
===== Friendlies =====
10 November 2017	England	0–0	Germany	London, England
20:00 GMT	Gomez (yellow card) 45+1'; Livermore (yellow card) 59'	Report		Stadium: Wembley Stadium; Attendance: 81,382; Referee: Pawel Raczkowski (Poland)

14 November 2017	England	0–0	Brazil	London, England
20:00 GMT	Livermore (yellow card) 54'	Report	Alves (yellow card) 56'	Stadium: Wembley Stadium; Attendance: 84,595; Referee: Artur Dias Soares (Portugal)

23 March 2018	Netherlands	0–1	England	Amsterdam, Netherlands
19:45 GMT		Report	Lingard 59'	Stadium: Amsterdam Arena; Attendance: 51,500; Referee: Jesús Gil Manzano (Spain)

27 March 2018	England	1–1	Italy	London, England
20:00 BST	Vardy 26'		Insigne 87' (pen.)	Stadium: Wembley Stadium; Attendance: 82,598; Referee: Deniz Aytekin (Germany)

2 June 2018	England	2–1	Nigeria	London, England
20:00 BST	Cahill 7'; Kane 39'	Report	Iwobi 47'	Stadium: Wembley Stadium; Attendance: 70,025; Referee: Marco Guida (Italy)

7 June 2018	England	2–0	Costa Rica	Leeds, England
20:00 BST	Rashford 13'; Welbeck 76'	Report		Stadium: Elland Road; Attendance: 36,104; Referee: Hiroyuki Kimura (Japan)

===== 2018 FIFA World Cup qualification (UEFA) =====
====== Group F ======
Pos	Team	Pld	W	D	L	GF	GA	GD	Pts	Qualification	England	Slovakia	Scotland	Slovenia	Lithuania	Malta
1	England	10	8	2	0	18	3	+15	26	Qualification to 2018 FIFA World Cup	—	2–1	3–0	1–0	2–0	2–0
2	Slovakia	10	6	0	4	17	7	+10	18		0–1	—	3–0	1–0	4–0	3–0
3	Scotland	10	5	3	2	17	12	+5	18		2–2	1–0	—	1–0	1–1	2–0
4	Slovenia	10	4	3	3	12	7	+5	15		0–0	1–0	2–2	—	4–0	2–0
5	Lithuania	10	1	3	6	7	20	−13	6		0–1	1–2	0–3	2–2	—	2–0
6	Malta	10	0	1	9	3	25	−22	1		0–4	1–3	1–5	0–1	1–1	—

Source: FIFA
Rules for classification: Qualification tiebreakers

2018 FIFA World Cup qualification tiebreakers
In league format, the ranking of teams in each group was based on the following criteria (regulations Articles 20.6 and 20.7):
1. Points (3 points for a win, 1 point for a draw, 0 points for a loss)
2. Overall goal difference
3. Overall goals scored
4. Points in matches between tied teams
5. Goal difference in matches between tied teams
6. Goals scored in matches between tied teams
7. Away goals scored in matches between tied teams (if the tie was only between two teams in home-and-away league format)
8. Fair play points
  - first yellow card: minus 1 point
  - indirect red card (second yellow card): minus 3 points
  - direct red card: minus 4 points
  - yellow card and direct red card: minus 5 points
9. Drawing of lots by the FIFA Organising Committee

1 September 2017 2018 FIFA World Cup qualification	Malta	0–4	England	Ta' Qali, Malta
19:45 BST		Report	Kane 53', 90+2'; Bertrand 85'; Welbeck 90+1'	Stadium: Ta' Qali National Stadium; Attendance: 16,994; Referee: Artur Dias Soares (Portugal)

4 September 2017 2018 FIFA World Cup qualification	England	2–1	Slovakia	London, England
19:45 BST	Dier 37'; Rashford 59'	Report	Lobotka 3'	Stadium: Wembley Stadium; Attendance: 67,823; Referee: Clément Turpin (France)

5 October 2017 2018 FIFA World Cup qualification	England	1–0	Slovenia	London, England
19:45 BST	Stones (yellow card) 44'; Kane 90+4'	Report	Krhin (yellow card) 38'; Mevlja (yellow card) 45+1'; Rotman (yellow card) 51'; Struna (yellow card) 86'; Birsa (yellow card) 90+6'	Stadium: Wembley Stadium; Attendance: 61,598; Referee: Felix Zwayer (Germany)

8 October 2017 2018 FIFA World Cup qualification	Lithuania	0–1	England	Vilnius, Lithuania
17:00 BST	Slivka (yellow card) 54'	Report	Kane 27' (pen.)	Stadium: LFF Stadium; Attendance: 5,067; Referee: Orel Grinfeld (Israel)

===== 2018 FIFA World Cup =====
====== Group G ======
Pos	Team	Pld	W	D	L	GF	GA	GD	Pts	Qualification
1	Belgium	3	3	0	0	9	2	+7	9	Advance to knockout stage
2	England	3	2	0	1	8	3	+5	6	Advance to knockout stage
3	Tunisia	3	1	0	2	5	8	−3	3	
4	Panama	3	0	0	3	2	11	−9	0	

Source: FIFA
Rules for classification: Group stage tiebreakers

Matches

18 June 2018 2018 WC Group G	Tunisia	1–2	England	Volgograd, Russia
21:00 MSK (UTC+3); 19:00 BST (UTC+1)	Sassi 35' (pen.)	Report	Kane 11', 90+1'; Walker (yellow card) 34'	Stadium: Volgograd Arena; Attendance: 41,064; Referee: Wilmar Roldán (Colombia)

24 June 2018 2018 WC Group G	England	6–1	Panama	Nizhny Novgorod, Russia
15:00 MSK (UTC+3); 13:00 BST (UTC+1)	Stones 8', 40'; Kane 22' (pen.), 45+1' (pen.), 62'; Loftus-Cheek (yellow card) 23'; Lingard 36'	Report	Cooper (yellow card) 10'; Escobar (yellow card) 44'; Murillo (yellow card) 72'; Baloy 78'	Stadium: Nizhny Novgorod Stadium; Attendance: 43,319; Referee: Gehad Grisha (Egypt)

28 June 2018 2018 WC Group G	England	0–1	Belgium	Kaliningrad, Russia
20:00 KALT (UTC+2); 19:00 BST (UTC+1)		Report	Tielemans (yellow card) 19'; Dendoncker (yellow card) 33'; Januzaj 51'	Stadium: Kaliningrad Stadium; Attendance: 33,973; Referee: Damir Skomina (Slovenia)

====== Knockout stage ======
3 July 2018 2018 WC Round of 16	Colombia	1–1 (a.e.t.) (3–4 p)	England	Moscow, Russia
21:00 MSK (UTC+3); 19:00 BST (UTC+1)	Barrios (yellow card) 41'; Arias (yellow card) 52'; Sánchez (yellow card) 54'; Falcao (yellow card) 63'; Bacca (yellow card) 64'; Mina 90+3'; Cuadrado (yellow card) 118'	Report	Henderson (yellow card) 56'; Kane 57' (pen.); Lingard (yellow card) 69'	Stadium: Spartak Stadium; Attendance: 44,190; Referee: Mark Geiger (United States)
	Penalties
	Falcao (penalty scored); Ju. Cuadrado (penalty scored); Muriel (penalty scored); Uribe (penalty missed); Bacca (penalty missed)		(penalty scored) Kane; (penalty scored) Rashford; (penalty missed) Henderson; (penalty scored) Trippier; (penalty scored) Dier

7 July 2018 2018 WC Quarter-finals	Sweden	0–2	England	Samara, Russia
18:00 SAMT (UTC+4); 15:00 BST (UTC+1)	Guidetti (yellow card) 87'; Larsson (yellow card) 90+4'	Report	Maguire 30' (yellow card) 87'; Alli 59'	Stadium: Cosmos Arena; Attendance: 39,991; Referee: Björn Kuipers (Netherlands)

11 July 2018 2018 WC Semi-finals	Croatia	2–1 (a.e.t.)	England	Moscow, Russia
21:00 MSK (UTC+3); 19:00 BST (UTC+1)	Perišić 68'; Rebić (yellow card) 96'; Mandžukić (yellow card) 48' (goal) 109'	Report	Trippier 5'; Walker (yellow card) 54'	Stadium: Luzhniki Stadium; Attendance: 78,011; Referee: Cüneyt Çakır (Turkey)

14 July 2018 2018 WC 3rd place	Belgium	2–0	England	Saint Petersburg, Russia
17:00 MSK (UTC+3); 15:00 BST (UTC+1)	Meunier 4'; E. Hazard 82'; Witsel (yellow card) 90+3'	Report	Stones (yellow card) 52'; Maguire (yellow card) 76'	Stadium: Krestovsky Stadium; Attendance: 64,406; Referee: Alireza Faghani (Iran)

=== England U-21 national football team ===
==== 2019 UEFA European Under-21 Championship qualification ====
===== Group 4 =====
Pos	Team	Pld	W	D	L	GF	GA	GD	Pts	Qualification	England	Netherlands	Ukraine	Scotland	Latvia	Andorra
1	England	10	8	2	0	23	4	+19	26	Final tournament	—	0–0	2–1	3–1	3–0	7–0
2	Netherlands	10	5	3	2	21	6	+15	18		1–1	—	3–0	1–2	3–0	8–0
3	Ukraine	10	5	2	3	18	12	+6	17		0–2	1–1	—	3–1	3–2	1–0
4	Scotland	10	4	2	4	13	13	0	14		0–2	2–0	0–2	—	1–1	3–0
5	Latvia	10	0	4	6	5	18	−13	4		1–2	0–3	1–1	0–2	—	0–0
6	Andorra	10	0	3	7	1	28	−27	3		0–1	0–1	0–6	1–1	0–0	—

Source: UEFA
Rules for classification: Qualification tiebreakers

=== England U-20 national football team ===
==== 2017 FIFA U-20 World Cup ====
===== Group A =====
Pos	Team	Pld	W	D	L	GF	GA	GD	Pts	Qualification
1	England	3	2	1	0	5	1	+4	7	Knockout stage
2	South Korea (H)	3	2	0	1	5	2	+3	6	Knockout stage
3	Argentina	3	1	0	2	6	5	+1	3	
4	Guinea	3	0	1	2	1	9	−8	1	

Source: FIFA
Rules for classification: Group stage tiebreakers
(H) Hosts

===== Round of 16 =====
31 May 2017
20:00

England	2–1	Costa Rica
Fry (yellow card) 5'; Lookman 35', 63'; Chapman (yellow card) 88'	Report	Mesen (yellow card) 52'; Salinas (yellow card) 70'; Leal 89'

Jeonju World Cup Stadium, Jeonju
Attendance: 4,428
Referee: Julio Bascuñán (Chile)

===== Quarter-finals =====
5 June 2017
20:00

Mexico	0–1	England
	Report	Solanke 47'; Onomah (yellow card) 33' (yellow-red card) 72'

Cheonan Stadium, Cheonan
Attendance: 5,953
Referee: Abdulla Hassan Mohamed (United Arab Emirates)

===== Semi-finals =====
8 June 2017
20:00

Italy	1–3	England
Orsolini 2'; Orsolini (yellow card) 28'; Favilli (yellow card) 37'; Vido (yellow card) 83'; Mandragora (yellow card) 84'	Report	Kenny (yellow card) 63'; Solanke 66', 88'; Lookman 77'

Jeonju World Cup Stadium, Jeonju
Attendance: 5,329
Referee: Antonio Mateu Lahoz (Spain)

===== Final =====
11 June 2017
19:00

Venezuela	0–1	England
Velasquez (yellow card) 46'	Report	Calvert-Lewin 35'; Tomori (yellow card) 48'; Dowell (yellow card) 58'

Suwon World Cup Stadium, Suwon
Attendance: 30,346
Referee: Björn Kuipers (Netherlands)

=== England U-19 national football team ===
==== 2018 UEFA European Under-19 Championship qualification ====
===== Group 8 =====
Pos	Team	Pld	W	D	L	GF	GA	GD	Pts	Qualification
1	England	3	3	0	0	9	1	+8	9	Elite round
2	Bulgaria (H)	3	2	0	1	4	2	+2	6	Elite round
3	Iceland	3	1	0	2	4	5	−1	3	
4	Faroe Islands	3	0	0	3	1	10	−9	0	

Source: UEFA
Rules for classification: Qualification tiebreakers
(H) Hosts

===== Elite round =====
Group 2
Pos	Team	Pld	W	D	L	GF	GA	GD	Pts	Qualification
1	England	3	2	0	1	7	3	+4	6 (Note: Head-to-head result: England 3–0 Latvia.)	Final tournament
2	Latvia	3	2	0	1	5	6	−1	6	
3	Hungary	3	1	0	2	7	10	−3	3 (Note: Head-to-head result: Macedonia 3–4 Hungary.)	
4	Macedonia (H)	3	1	0	2	6	6	0	3	

Source: UEFA
Rules for classification: Qualification tiebreakers
(H) Hosts
Notes:
21 March 2018
14:00

Hungary	1–4	England
Bévárdi 39'	Report	Mount 48'; Nelson 54', 86'; Sancho 87'

Philip II Arena, Skopje
Referee: Christian Dingert (Germany)

24 March 2018
14:00

England	3–0	Latvia
Mount 22'; Nketiah 52'; Hirst 82'	Report

Philip II Arena, Skopje
Referee: Karim Abed (France)

27 March 2018
14:00

England	0–2	North Macedonia
	Report	Atanasov 3'; Mitrovski 90+1'

Training Centre Petar Miloševski, Skopje
Referee: Christian Dingert (Germany)

=== England U-17 national football team ===
==== 2017 FIFA U-17 World Cup ====
===== Group F =====
Pos	Team	Pld	W	D	L	GF	GA	GD	Pts	Qualification
1	England	3	3	0	0	11	2	+9	9	Knockout stage
2	Iraq	3	1	1	1	4	5	−1	4	Knockout stage
3	Mexico	3	0	2	1	3	4	−1	2	Knockout stage
4	Chile	3	0	1	2	0	7	−7	1	

Source: FIFA
Rules for classification: Group stage tiebreakers

===== Round of 16 =====
17 October 2017
20:00

England	0–0	Japan
	Report
Penalties
Brewster (penalty scored); Hudson-Odoi (penalty scored); Foden (penalty scored); Anderson (penalty scored); Kirby (penalty scored)	5–3	(penalty scored) Sugawara; (penalty scored) Miyashiro; (penalty missed) Kida; (penalty scored) Kozuki

Salt Lake Stadium, Kolkata
Attendance: 53,302
Referee: José Argote (Venezuela)

===== Quarter-finals =====
21 October 2017
20:00

United States	1–4	England
Sargent 72'	Report	Brewster 11', 14', 90+6' (pen.); Gibbs-White 64'

Fatorda Stadium, Margao
Attendance: 16,148
Referee: Clément Turpin (France)

===== Semi-finals =====
25 October 2017
17:00

Brazil	1–3	England
Wesley 21'	Report	Brewster 10', 39', 77'

Salt Lake Stadium, Kolkata (Note: The venue of was moved to Salt Lake Stadium, Kolkata, following assessment of the pitch conditions of the original venue, Indira Gandhi Athletic Stadium, Guwahati, which had been affected by severe rainfall.)
Attendance: 63,881
Referee: Ovidiu Hațegan (Romania)

===== Final =====
28 October 2017
20:00

England	5–2	Spain
Brewster 44'; Gibss-White 58'; Foden 69', 88'; Guehi 84'	Report	Gómez 10', 31'

Salt Lake Stadium, Kolkata
Attendance: 66,684
Referee: Enrique Cáceres (Paraguay)

==== 2018 UEFA European Under-17 Championship ====
The final draw was held in April 2018 in England. The 16 teams were drawn into four groups of four teams. Hosts England were assigned to position A1 in the draw, while the other teams were seeded according to their results in the qualification elite round, with the seven best elite round group winners (counting all elite round results) placed in Pot 1 and drawn to positions 1 and 2 in the groups, and the remaining eight teams (the eighth-best elite round group winner and the seven elite round group runners-up) placed in Pot 2 and drawn to positions 3 and 4 in the groups.

===== Group A =====
Pos	Team	Pld	W	D	L	GF	GA	GD	Pts	Qualification
1	Italy	3	2	0	1	5	2	+3	6	Knockout stage
2	England (H)	3	2	0	1	4	3	+1	6	Knockout stage
3	Switzerland	3	2	0	1	4	2	+2	6	
4	Israel	3	0	0	3	1	7	−6	0	

Source: UEFA
Rules for classification: Group stage tiebreakers
(H) Hosts

4 May 2018	England	2–1	Israel	Proact Stadium, Chesterfield
19:00	Doyle 29' (pen.); Daly 61'	Report	Lugassy 40+1' (pen.)	Attendance: 6,102; Referee: Halil Umut Meler (Turkey)

7 May 2018	England	2–1	Italy	Bescot Stadium, Walsall
15:00	Appiah 64'; Doyle 69' (pen.)	Report	Riccardi 14'	Attendance: 7,159; Referee: Vilhjalmur Thorarinsson (Iceland)

10 May 2018	Switzerland	1–0	England	New York Stadium, Rotherham
19:00	Mambimbi 40+1'	Report		Referee: Horatiu Fesnic (Romania)

===== Quarter-finals =====
13 May 2018	Norway	0–2	England	Pirelli Stadium, Burton
18:00		Report	Duncan 14'; Amaechi 49'	Referee: Juri Frischer (Estonia)

===== Semi-finals =====
17 May 2018	England	0–0 (5–6 p)	Netherlands	Proact Stadium, Chesterfield
19:00		Report		Attendance: 7,952; Referee: Horatiu Fesnic (Romania)
	Penalties
	John-Jules (penalty scored); Daly (penalty scored); Saka (penalty scored); Ashby-Hammond (penalty scored); Appiah (penalty scored); Balogun (penalty missed)		(penalty scored) Burger; (penalty scored) Ihattaren; (penalty scored) Hendriks; (penalty scored) Tavsan; (penalty scored) J. Timber; (penalty scored) Q. Timber

=== England women's national football team ===
==== Results and fixtures ====
===== Friendlies =====
1 July 2017	Denmark	1–2	England	Copenhagen, Denmark
18:00	Harder 66'	Report	White 44', 76'	Stadium: Gladsaxe Stadium; Referee: Sara Persson (Sweden)

20 October 2017	France	1–0	England	Valenciennes, France
19:50 BST				Stadium: Stade du Hainaut

===== UEFA Women's Euro 2017 =====
====== Group D ======
Pos	Team	Pld	W	D	L	GF	GA	GD	Pts	Qualification
1	England	3	3	0	0	10	1	+9	9	Knockout stage
2	Spain	3	1	0	2	2	3	−1	3 (Note: Tied on head-to-head points (3). Head-to-head goal difference: Spain +1, Scotland 0, Portugal −1.)	Knockout stage
3	Scotland	3	1	0	2	2	8	−6	3	
4	Portugal	3	1	0	2	3	5	−2	3	

Source: UEFA
Rules for classification: Group stage tiebreakers
Notes:

19 July 2017 Euro 2017 – GS	England	6–0	Scotland	Utrecht, Netherlands
19:45	Taylor 11', 26', 53'; White 32'; Nobbs 87'; Duggan 90+3'	Report		Stadium: Stadion Galgenwaard; Attendance: 5,578; Referee: Esther Staubli (Switzerland)

23 July 2017 Euro 2017 – GS	England	2–0	Spain	Breda, Netherlands
19:45	Kirby 2'; Taylor 85'	Report		Stadium: Rat Verlegh Stadion; Attendance: 4,879; Referee: Carina Vitulano (Italy)

27 July 2017 Euro 2017 – GS	Portugal	1–2	England	Tilburg, Netherlands
19:45	C. Mendes 17'	Report	Duggan 7'; Parris 48'	Stadium: Koning Willem II Stadion; Attendance: 3,335; Referee: Kateryna Monzul (Ukraine)

30 July 2017 Euro 2017 – QF	England	1–0	France	Deventer, Netherlands
20:45	Taylor 60'	Report		Stadium: De Adelaarshorst, Attendance: 6,283; Referee: Esther Staubli (Switzerland)

3 August 2017 Euro 2017 – SF	Netherlands	3–0	England	Enschede, Netherlands
20:45				Stadium: De Grolsch Veste; Referee: Stéphanie Frappart (France)

===== 2019 FIFA Women's World Cup qualification (UEFA) =====
====== 2019 FIFA Women's World Cup qualification – UEFA Group 1 ======
Pos	Team	Pld	W	D	L	GF	GA	GD	Pts	Qualification	England	Wales	Russia	Bosnia and Herzegovina	Kazakhstan
1	England	8	7	1	0	29	1	+28	22	2019 FIFA Women's World Cup	—	0–0	6–0	4–0	5–0
2	Wales	8	5	2	1	7	3	+4	17		0–3	—	3–0	1–0	1–0
3	Russia	8	4	1	3	16	13	+3	13		1–3	0–0	—	3–0	3–0
4	Bosnia and Herzegovina	8	1	0	7	3	19	−16	3 (Note: Head-to-head results: Kazakhstan 0–2 Bosnia and Herzegovina, Bosnia and Herzegovina 0–2 Kazakhstan (tied on head-to-head results, ranked on total goal difference).)		0–2	0–1	1–6	—	0–2
5	Kazakhstan	8	1	0	7	2	21	−19	3		0–6	0–1	0–3	0–2	—

Source: UEFA
Notes:

19 September 2017 WCQ-G1	England	6–0	Russia	Birkenhead, England
19:00	Parris 11'; Taylor 14'; Nobbs 36'; Bronze 44'; Duggan 57', 84'	Report		Stadium: Prenton Park; Referee: Stéphanie Frappart (France)

24 November 2017 WCQ-G1	England	4–0	Bosnia and Herzegovina	Walsall, England
20:05	Houghton 19', 54'; Parris 46'; Kirby 83' (pen.)	Report		Stadium: Bescot Stadium; Attendance: 10,026; Referee: Ewa Augustyn (Poland)

28 November 2017 WCQ-G1	England	5–0	Kazakhstan	Colchester, England
20:05	Lawley 15'; Kirby 64' (pen.); Parris 69', 75'; Christiansen 76'	Report		Stadium: Colchester Community Stadium; Attendance: 9,643; Referee: Lois Otte (Belgium)

6 April 2018 WCQ-G1	England	0–0	Wales	Southampton, England
20:00		Report		Stadium: St Mary's Stadium; Attendance: 25,603; Referee: Pernilla Larsson (Sweden)

10 April 2018 WCQ-G1	Bosnia and Herzegovina	0–2	England	Bosnia and Herzegovina FA Training Centre, Zenica
16:00			Duggan 56'; Taylor 90+3' (pen.)	Attendance: 340; Referee: Andromachi Tsiofliki (Greece)

8 June 2018 WCQ-G1	Russia	1–3	England	Sapsan Arena, Moscow
18:00	Danilova 31'		Parris 22'; Scott 27', 36'	Attendance: 1,859; Referee: Riem Hussein (Germany)

===== 2018 SheBelieves Cup =====
Pos	Team	Pld	W	D	L	GF	GA	GD	Pts
1st place, gold medalist(s)	United States (H, C)	3	2	1	0	3	1	+2	7
2nd place, silver medalist(s)	England	3	1	1	1	6	4	+2	4
3rd place, bronze medalist(s)	France	3	1	1	1	5	5	0	4
4	Germany	3	0	1	2	2	6	−4	1

Source: USSoccer
Rules for classification: 1) points; 2) goal difference; 3) goals scored; 4) head-to-head points; 5) head-to-head goal difference; 6) head-to-head number of goals scored; 7) FIFA ranking.
(C) Champions; (H) Hosts

1 March 2018	England	4–1	France	Columbus, United States
16:00 ET	Duggan 7'; Scott 28'; Taylor 39'; Kirby 46'	Report	Thiney 77'	Stadium: MAPFRE Stadium; Attendance: 7,566; Referee: Christina Unkel (United States)

4 March 2018	Germany	2–2	England	Harrison, United States
15:00 ET	Kayikci 17'; Bright 51' (o.g.)	Report	White 18', 73'	Stadium: Red Bull Arena; Attendance: 7,882; Referee: Karen Abt (United States)

7 March 2018	United States	1–0	England	Orlando, United States
19:00 ET	Bardsley 58' (o.g.)	Report		Stadium: Orlando City Stadium; Attendance: 12,351; Referee: Carol Anne Chenard (Canada)

==== Managerial changes ====
Outgoing manager	Manner of departure	Date of departure	Incoming manager	Date of appointment
(Wales) Mark Sampson	Sacked	20 September 2017	(England) Phil Neville	23 January 2018

=== England women's U-19 national football team ===
==== 2017 UEFA Women's Under-19 Championship ====
===== Group B =====
Pos	Team	Pld	W	D	L	GF	GA	GD	Pts	Qualification
1	Netherlands	3	2	1	0	7	3	+4	7	Knockout stage and 2018 FIFA U-20 Women's World Cup
2	France	3	2	0	1	7	3	+4	6	Knockout stage and 2018 FIFA U-20 Women's World Cup
3	England	3	1	0	2	2	4	−2	3	FIFA U-20 Women's World Cup play-off (Note: Because France are among the semi-finalists, the two third-placed teams of the group stage enter the FIFA U-20 Women's World Cup play-off where the winner qualifies for the 2018 FIFA U-20 Women's World Cup.)
4	Italy	3	0	1	2	5	11	−6	1	

Source: UEFA
Rules for classification: Group stage tiebreakers

===== Knockout stage =====
17 August 2017	Scotland	0–2	England	Lurgan, Northern Ireland
19:00		Report	Cross 28'; Rouse 50'	Stadium: Mourneview Park; Attendance: 107; Referee: Petra Pavlikova (Slovakia)

==== 2018 UEFA Women's Under-19 Championship qualification ====
===== Qualifying round =====
Pos	Team	Pld	W	D	L	GF	GA	GD	Pts	Qualification
1	England	3	3	0	0	14	0	+14	9	Elite round
2	Slovenia	3	1	1	1	4	1	+3	4	Elite round
3	Wales	3	1	1	1	6	4	+2	4	Elite round
4	Kazakhstan (H)	3	0	0	3	0	19	−19	0	

Source: UEFA
Rules for classification: Qualification tiebreakers
(H) Hosts

===== Elite round =====
Group 2
Pos	Team	Pld	W	D	L	GF	GA	GD	Pts	Qualification
1	Germany	3	3	0	0	14	2	+12	9	Final tournament
2	England	3	2	0	1	12	4	+8	6	
3	Israel	3	0	1	2	1	7	−6	1	
4	Slovakia (H)	3	0	1	2	0	14	−14	1	

Source: UEFA
Rules for classification: Qualification tiebreakers
(H) Hosts
3 April 2018
15:00

England	4–1	Israel
Galloway 5'; Palmer 31'; Ngunga 68'; Toone 90+4' (pen.)	Report	Elinav 75'

Športový areál OFK, Dunajská Lužná
Referee: Ivana Projkovska (Macedonia)
6 April 2018
17:00

England	6–0	Slovakia
Ngunga 16', 21'; Cain 28'; Allen 62'; Toone 79' (pen.); Hayles 85'	Report

NTC Senec, Senec
Referee: Eleni Antoniou (Greece)
9 April 2018
11:00

Germany	3–2	England
Stolze 3'; Krumbiegel 59'; Oberdorf 84'	Report	Cain 13'; Hemp 87'

Športový areál OFK, Dunajská Lužná
Referee: Eleni Antoniou (Greece)

=== England women's U-17 national football team ===
==== 2018 UEFA Women's Under-17 Championship qualification ====
===== Qualifying round =====
Pos	Team	Pld	W	D	L	GF	GA	GD	Pts	Qualification
1	England	3	3	0	0	19	0	+19	9	Elite round
2	Scotland	3	2	0	1	5	3	+2	6	Elite round
3	Slovakia	3	1	0	2	5	7	−2	3	
4	Latvia (H)	3	0	0	3	0	19	−19	0	

Source: UEFA
Rules for classification: Qualification tiebreakers
(H) Hosts

===== Elite round =====
Group 5
Pos	Team	Pld	W	D	L	GF	GA	GD	Pts	Qualification
1	England	3	2	1	0	6	0	+6	7	Final tournament
2	Norway (H)	3	2	0	1	6	2	+4	6	
3	Slovenia	3	1	1	1	2	2	0	4	
4	Switzerland	3	0	0	3	1	11	−10	0	

Source: UEFA
Rules for classification: Qualification tiebreakers
(H) Hosts

25 March 2018	England	0–0	Slovenia	Klepp Stadion, Kleppe
13:00		Report		Referee: Ainara Andrea Acevedo Dudley (Spain)

28 March 2018	England	4–0	Switzerland	Ålgård stadion, Ålgård
13:00	Blanchard 28', 64'; Griffin 61'; Kearns 62'	Report		Referee: Andromachi Tsiofliki (Greece)

31 March 2018	Norway	0–2	England	Klepp Stadion, Kleppe
15:00		Report	Park 53'; Fossem 60' (o.g.)	Referee: Andromachi Tsiofliki (Greece)

==== 2018 UEFA Women's Under-17 Championship ====
===== Group B =====
Pos	Team	Pld	W	D	L	GF	GA	GD	Pts	Qualification
1	Spain	3	2	1	0	7	1	+6	7	Knockout stage
2	England	3	1	1	1	7	4	+3	4	Knockout stage
3	Italy	3	0	2	1	0	4	−4	2	
4	Poland	3	0	2	1	2	7	−5	2	

Source: UEFA
Rules for classification: Group stage tiebreakers

9 May 2018	Poland	2–2	England	Savivaldybė Stadium, Šiauliai
17:00	Filipczak 48'; Tomasiak 80+2'	Report	Park 58'; McKenzie 68'	Referee: Lucie Šulcová (Czech Republic)

12 May 2018	Spain	2–1	England	Alytus Stadium, Alytus
13:00	Arana 4'; Navarro 70'	Report	Salmon 26'	Referee: Kateryna Usova (Ukraine)

15 May 2018	England	4–0	Italy	Sūduva Stadium, Marijampolė
13:00	Salmon 47', 63', 65'; Blanchard 72'	Report		Referee: Irena Velevačkoska (Macedonia)

===== Semi-finals =====
18 May 2018	Germany	8–0	England	Alytus Stadium, Alytus
16:30	Rendell 23' (o.g.); Martinez 27', 44', 61'; Köster 30', 72'; Fuso 50'; Fudalla 64'	Report		Referee: Hristiana Guteva (Bulgaria)

===== 3rd place =====
21 May 2018	England	1–2	Finland	Alytus Stadium, Alytus
14:00	Park 12'	Report	Huhta 46'; Kantanen 61'	Referee: Frida Nielsen (Denmark)

== UEFA competitions ==
=== UEFA Champions League ===
==== Play-off round ====
Team 1	Agg.	Team 2	1st leg	2nd leg
1899 Hoffenheim (Germany)	3–6	(England) Liverpool	1–2	2–4

==== Group stage ====
===== Group A =====
Pos	Team	Pld	W	D	L	GF	GA	GD	Pts	Qualification	MUN	BSL	CSKA	BEN
1	(England) Manchester United	6	5	0	1	12	3	+9	15	Advance to knockout phase	—	3–0	2–1	2–0
2	(Switzerland) Basel	6	4	0	2	11	5	+6	12	Advance to knockout phase	1–0	—	1–2	5–0
3	(Russia) CSKA Moscow	6	3	0	3	8	10	−2	9	Transfer to Europa League	1–4	0–2	—	2–0
4	(Portugal) Benfica	6	0	0	6	1	14	−13	0		0–1	0–2	1–2	—

Source: UEFA

===== Group C =====
Pos	Team	Pld	W	D	L	GF	GA	GD	Pts	Qualification	ROM	CHE	ATM	QRB
1	(Italy) Roma	6	3	2	1	9	6	+3	11 (Note: Head-to-head results: Chelsea 3–3 Roma, Roma 3–0 Chelsea.)	Advance to knockout phase	—	3–0	0–0	1–0
2	(England) Chelsea	6	3	2	1	16	8	+8	11	Advance to knockout phase	3–3	—	1–1	6–0
3	(Spain) Atlético Madrid	6	1	4	1	5	4	+1	7	Transfer to Europa League	2–0	1–2	—	1–1
4	(Azerbaijan) Qarabağ	6	0	2	4	2	14	−12	2		1–2	0–4	0–0	—

Source: UEFA

===== Group E =====
Pos	Team	Pld	W	D	L	GF	GA	GD	Pts	Qualification	LIV	SEV	SPM	MRB
1	(England) Liverpool	6	3	3	0	23	6	+17	12	Advance to knockout phase	—	2–2	7–0	3–0
2	(Spain) Sevilla	6	2	3	1	12	12	0	9	Advance to knockout phase	3–3	—	2–1	3–0
3	(Russia) Spartak Moscow	6	1	3	2	9	13	−4	6	Transfer to Europa League	1–1	5–1	—	1–1
4	(Slovenia) Maribor	6	0	3	3	3	16	−13	3		0–7	1–1	1–1	—

Source: UEFA

===== Group F =====
Pos	Team	Pld	W	D	L	GF	GA	GD	Pts	Qualification	MCI	SHK	NAP	FEY
1	(England) Manchester City	6	5	0	1	14	5	+9	15	Advance to knockout phase	—	2–0	2–1	1–0
2	(Ukraine) Shakhtar Donetsk	6	4	0	2	9	9	0	12	Advance to knockout phase	2–1	—	2–1	3–1
3	(Italy) Napoli	6	2	0	4	11	11	0	6	Transfer to Europa League	2–4	3–0	—	3–1
4	(Netherlands) Feyenoord	6	1	0	5	5	14	−9	3		0–4	1–2	2–1	—

Source: UEFA

===== Group H =====
Pos	Team	Pld	W	D	L	GF	GA	GD	Pts	Qualification	TOT	RMA	DOR	APO
1	(England) Tottenham Hotspur	6	5	1	0	15	4	+11	16	Advance to knockout phase	—	3–1	3–1	3–0
2	(Spain) Real Madrid	6	4	1	1	17	7	+10	13	Advance to knockout phase	1–1	—	3–2	3–0
3	(Germany) Borussia Dortmund	6	0	2	4	7	13	−6	2 (Note: Head-to-head results: APOEL 1–1 Borussia Dortmund, Borussia Dortmund 1–1 APOEL (tied on head-to-head results, ranked on total goal difference).)	Transfer to Europa League	1–2	1–3	—	1–1
4	(Cyprus) APOEL	6	0	2	4	2	17	−15	2		0–3	0–6	1–1	—

Source: UEFA

==== Knockout phase ====
===== Round of 16 =====
Team 1	Agg.	Team 2	1st leg	2nd leg
Juventus (Italy)	4–3	(England) Tottenham Hotspur	2–2	2–1
Basel (Switzerland)	2–5	(England) Manchester City	0–4	2–1
Porto (Portugal)	0–5	(England) Liverpool	0–5	0–0
Sevilla (Spain)	2–1	(England) Manchester United	0–0	2–1
Chelsea (England)	1–4	(Spain) Barcelona	1–1	0–3

===== Quarter-finals =====
Team 1	Agg.	Team 2	1st leg	2nd leg
Liverpool (England)	5–1	(England) Manchester City	3–0	2–1

===== Semi-finals =====
Team 1	Agg.	Team 2	1st leg	2nd leg
Liverpool (England)	7–6	(Italy) Roma	5–2	2–4

===== Final =====
The final was played at the NSC Olimpiyskiy in Kyiv on 26 May 2018. The "home" team (for administrative purposes) was determined by an additional draw held after the semi-final draw.

26 May 2018
21:45 UTC+3

Real Madrid (Spain)	3–1	(England) Liverpool
Benzema 51'; Bale 63', 83'	Report	Mané 55'

NSC Olimpiyskiy, Kyiv
Attendance: 61,561
Referee: Milorad Mažić (Serbia)

=== UEFA Europa League ===
==== Qualifying rounds ====
===== Third qualifying round =====
Team 1	Agg.	Team 2	1st leg	2nd leg
Everton (England)	2–0	(Slovakia) Ružomberok	1–0	1–0

===== Play-off round =====
Team 1	Agg.	Team 2	1st leg	2nd leg
Everton (England)	3–1	(Croatia) Hajduk Split	2–0	1–1

==== Group stage ====
===== Group E =====
Pos	Team	Pld	W	D	L	GF	GA	GD	Pts	Qualification	ATA	LYO	EVE	APL
1	(Italy) Atalanta	6	4	2	0	14	4	+10	14	Advance to knockout phase	—	1–0	3–0	3–1
2	(France) Lyon	6	3	2	1	11	4	+7	11	Advance to knockout phase	1–1	—	3–0	4–0
3	(England) Everton	6	1	1	4	7	15	−8	4		1–5	1–2	—	2–2
4	(Cyprus) Apollon Limassol	6	0	3	3	5	14	−9	3		1–1	1–1	0–3	—

Source: UEFA

===== Group H =====
Pos	Team	Pld	W	D	L	GF	GA	GD	Pts	Qualification	ARS	ZVE	KLN	BATE
1	(England) Arsenal	6	4	1	1	14	4	+10	13	Advance to knockout phase	—	0–0	3–1	6–0
2	(Serbia) Red Star Belgrade	6	2	3	1	3	2	+1	9	Advance to knockout phase	0–1	—	1–0	1–1
3	(Germany) 1. FC Köln	6	2	0	4	7	8	−1	6		1–0	0–1	—	5–2
4	(Belarus) BATE Borisov	6	1	2	3	6	16	−10	5		2–4	0–0	1–0	—

Source: UEFA

==== Knockout phase ====
===== Round of 32 =====
Team 1	Agg.	Team 2	1st leg	2nd leg
Östersund (Sweden)	2–4	(England) Arsenal	0–3	2–1

===== Round of 16 =====
Team 1	Agg.	Team 2	1st leg	2nd leg
Milan (Italy)	1–5	(England) Arsenal	0–2	1–3

===== Quarter-finals =====
Team 1	Agg.	Team 2	1st leg	2nd leg
Arsenal (England)	6–3	(Russia) CSKA Moscow	4–1	2–2

===== Semi-finals =====
Team 1	Agg.	Team 2	1st leg	2nd leg
Arsenal (England)	1–2	(Spain) Atlético Madrid	1–1	0–1

=== UEFA Super Cup ===
8 August 2017
20:45 UTC+2

Real Madrid (Spain)	2–1	(England) Manchester United
Casemiro 24'; Isco 52'	Report	Lukaku 62'

Philip II Arena, Skopje
Attendance: 30,421
Referee: Gianluca Rocchi (Italy)

=== UEFA Youth League ===
==== Group stage ====
===== Group A =====
Pos	Team	Pld	W	D	L	GF	GA	GD	Pts	Qualification	BSL	MUN	BEN	CSKA
1	(Switzerland) Basel	6	3	2	1	14	11	+3	11 (Note: Head-to-head results: Manchester United 4–3 Basel, Basel 2–1 Manchester United (Basel won on away goals).)	Round of 16	—	2–1	2–2	4–2
2	(England) Manchester United	6	3	2	1	11	9	+2	11	Play-offs	4–3	—	1–1	1–0
3	(Portugal) Benfica	6	1	4	1	10	8	+2	7		0–0	2–2	—	5–1
4	(Russia) CSKA Moscow	6	1	0	5	8	15	−7	3		2–3	1–2	2–0	—

Source: UEFA

===== Group C =====
Pos	Team	Pld	W	D	L	GF	GA	GD	Pts	Qualification	CHE	ATM	ROM	QRB
1	(England) Chelsea	6	5	0	1	17	7	+10	15	Round of 16	—	4–2	0–2	5–0
2	(Spain) Atlético Madrid	6	3	0	3	12	11	+1	9 (Note: Head-to-head results: Roma 1–2 Atlético Madrid, Atlético Madrid 2–1 Roma.)	Play-offs	1–3	—	2–1	0–1
3	(Italy) Roma	6	3	0	3	11	6	+5	9		1–2	1–2	—	3–0
4	(Azerbaijan) Qarabağ	6	1	0	5	3	19	−16	3		1–3	1–5	0–3	—

Source: UEFA

===== Group E =====
Pos	Team	Pld	W	D	L	GF	GA	GD	Pts	Qualification	LIV	SPM	SEV	MRB
1	(England) Liverpool	6	5	0	1	18	3	+15	15	Round of 16	—	2–0	4–0	3–0
2	(Russia) Spartak Moscow	6	2	2	2	11	8	+3	8 (Note: Head-to-head results: Spartak Moscow 1–1 Sevilla, Sevilla 3–3 Spartak Moscow (Spartak Moscow won on away goals).)	Play-offs	2–1	—	1–1	5–0
3	(Spain) Sevilla	6	2	2	2	6	12	−6	8		0–4	3–3	—	1–0
4	(Slovenia) Maribor	6	1	0	5	2	14	−12	3		1–4	1–0	0–1	—

Source: UEFA

===== Group F =====
Pos	Team	Pld	W	D	L	GF	GA	GD	Pts	Qualification	MCI	FEY	SHK	NAP
1	(England) Manchester City	6	4	1	1	14	7	+7	13	Round of 16	—	0–0	3–1	3–1
2	(Netherlands) Feyenoord	6	2	3	1	11	8	+3	9	Play-offs	0–2	—	4–0	4–3
3	(Ukraine) Shakhtar Donetsk	6	2	1	3	7	12	−5	7		2–1	1–1	—	1–2
4	(Italy) Napoli	6	1	1	4	12	17	−5	4		3–5	2–2	1–2	—

Source: UEFA

===== Group H =====
Pos	Team	Pld	W	D	L	GF	GA	GD	Pts	Qualification	TOT	RMA	DOR	APO
1	(England) Tottenham Hotspur	6	4	1	1	15	6	+9	13	Round of 16	—	3–2	4–0	4–1
2	(Spain) Real Madrid	6	3	1	2	21	10	+11	10	Play-offs	1–1	—	2–1	10–0
3	(Germany) Borussia Dortmund	6	3	0	3	14	12	+2	9		1–3	5–3	—	5–0
4	(Cyprus) APOEL	6	1	0	5	2	24	−22	3		1–0	0–3	0–2	—

Source: UEFA

==== Knockout phase ====
For the knockout phase (round of 16 onwards), the 16 teams are drawn into a single-elimination tournament, with all ties played over one match.

===== Play-offs =====
Team 1	Score	Team 2
Brodarac (Serbia)	0–2	(England) Manchester United

===== Round of 16 =====
Team 1	Score	Team 2
Manchester City (England)	1–1(3–2 p)	(Italy) Internazionale
Liverpool (England)	2–0	(England) Manchester United
Tottenham Hotspur (England)	1–1(3–1 p)	(France) Monaco
Chelsea (England)	5–2	(Netherlands) Feyenoord

===== Quarter-finals =====
Team 1	Score	Team 2
Real Madrid (Spain)	2–4	(England) Chelsea
Manchester City (England)	1–1(3–2 p)	(England) Liverpool
Tottenham Hotspur (England)	0–2	(Portugal) Porto

===== Semi-finals =====
Team 1	Score	Team 2
Manchester City (England)	4–5	(Spain) Barcelona
Chelsea (England)	2–2(5–4 p)	(Portugal) Porto

===== Finals =====
The final was played on 23 April 2018 at Colovray Stadium, Nyon.

23 April 2018
17:00 UTC+2

Chelsea (England)	0–3	(Spain) Barcelona
	Report	Marqués 33', 52'; Ruiz 90+2'

Colovray Stadium, Nyon
Attendance: 7,200
Referee: Andreas Ekberg (Sweden)

=== UEFA Women's Champions League ===
==== Knockout phase ====
===== Round of 32 =====
Team 1	Agg.	Team 2	1st leg	2nd leg
Chelsea (England)	2–2 (a)	(Germany) Bayern Munich	1–0	1–2
St. Pölten (Austria)	0–6	(England) Manchester City	0–3	0–3

===== Round of 16 =====
Team 1	Agg.	Team 2	1st leg	2nd leg
Chelsea (England)	4–0	(Sweden) Rosengård	3–0	1–0
Lillestrøm (Norway)	1–7	(England) Manchester City	0–5	1–2

===== Quarter-finals =====
Team 1	Agg.	Team 2	1st leg	2nd leg
Montpellier (France)	1–5	(England) Chelsea	0–2	1–3
Manchester City (England)	7–3	(Sweden) Linköping	2–0	5–3

===== Semi-finals =====
Team 1	Agg.	Team 2	1st leg	2nd leg
Chelsea (England)	1–5	(Germany) VfL Wolfsburg	1–3	0–2
Manchester City (England)	0–1	(France) Lyon	0–0	0–1

== Men's football ==
=== League season ===
==== Promotion and relegation ====
League Division	Promoted to league ▲	Relegated from league ▼
Premier League	Newcastle United ▲; Brighton & Hove Albion ▲; Huddersfield Town ▲	Hull City ▼; Middlesbrough ▼; Sunderland ▼
Championship	Sheffield United ▲; Bolton Wanderers ▲; Millwall ▲	Blackburn Rovers ▼; Wigan Athletic ▼; Rotherham United ▼
League One	Portsmouth ▲; Plymouth Argyle ▲; Doncaster Rovers ▲; Blackpool ▲	Port Vale ▼; Swindon Town ▼; Coventry City ▼; Chesterfield ▼
League Two	Lincoln City ▲; Forest Green Rovers ▲	Hartlepool United ▼; Leyton Orient ▼
National League	AFC Fylde ▲; Maidenhead United ▲; FC Halifax Town ▲; Ebbsfleet United ▲	York City ▼; Braintree Town ▼; Southport ▼; North Ferriby United ▼

==== Premier League ====
In what was largely a one-sided race for the title, Manchester City won the Premier League for the third time in six years, breaking records for the highest number of goals scored by one team in a league campaign and the most victories as well as gathering the most points, becoming the first top-flight team to reach the 100-point mark. This gave manager Pep Guardiola his first pieces of silverware with the club, having also won the League Cup – with perhaps the only blemishes in the season being a shock FA Cup loss at 2013 winners Wigan Athletic and a 5–1 aggregate loss to Liverpool in the Champions League quarter-finals. Finishing second were neighbours Manchester United, whose second season under José Mourinho finished with mixed success. While they improved on the previous league season and finished as runners-up in the FA Cup final, they never came close to challenging City for the title and also endured an early exit in the Champions League at the hands at Sevilla, though they did finish higher than fourth for the first time since Sir Alex Ferguson retired in 2013.

Tottenham Hotspur successfully qualified for the Champions League once again, but this proved to be their only success in the season as they failed to win their first trophy in ten years. Early woes at their temporary home of Wembley saw the London club's hopes of challenging for the title diminish once again, with a loss of late form and fitness costing striker Harry Kane a third successive Golden Boot. A run of only three wins from their opening nine league matches extinguished Liverpool's hopes of ending their 28-year wait for a league title. Otherwise, their season proved to be a successful one as they ensured qualification for the Champions League once again, breaking the record for the most league seasons where they avoided defeat at Anfield, while summer signing Mohamed Salah narrowly broke the 22-year record for the most goals scored in a league season by scoring 32. However, their biggest achievement proved to be in the Champions League as they reached the final in Kyiv against all odds, only narrowly losing to Real Madrid.

Chelsea endured what proved to be a poor defence of their title and finished fifth, missing out on the Champions League once again. A woeful start to 2018 costing them a place in the top four despite four wins in their last six games (and making it the third season in a row where the defending champions failed to finish in the top four) and winning their first FA Cup since 2012. Arsenal were unable to send manager Arsène Wenger, who resigned after 22 years as manager, out on a high as they finished in their lowest league position under the Frenchman and missed out on trophies, most notably being knocked out of the Europa League in the semi-finals. Burnley proved to be the surprise package of the whole season as they mounted a charge for Champions League qualification and stood fifth at Christmas. While 11 matches without a win saw them slide out of the top five, the Clarets recovered enough to secure seventh place and qualify for the Europa League. Everton and Leicester City looked set to battle relegation after poor starts to the season, but they rallied after the respective appointments of Sam Allardyce and Claude Puel, only missing out on the Europa League late on in the season.

For only the third time in Premier League history, all three promoted teams avoided the drop. Newcastle United finished highest, a final day win against Chelsea earning them a tenth-place finish after a poor run of form. Brighton & Hove Albion's first top-flight campaign since 1983 saw the Seagulls finish below them, never being seriously threatened with immediate relegation despite a few scares. However, arguably the biggest surprise of the three were Huddersfield Town, who defied all expectations and ensured Premier League survival in their first season in the top-flight for 45 years. While a dreadful goal-scoring record (having scored less than both Salah and Kane) and heavy losses both home and away threatened their hopes, key points gained at crucial stages helped push the Terriers away from the drop and towards safety in their penultimate match, a remarkable effort that earned the team and their American head coach David Wagner plenty of praise.

Despite making the worst start in the history of English football, going into the October international break goalless and pointless after seven games, a resurgence under former England manager Roy Hodgson saw Crystal Palace extend their stay in the top-flight to a sixth successive season – steering well clear of relegation in the process. While successfully ensuring a fourth consecutive season in the Premier League, Watford endured what proved to be another season of struggle. They did make a superb start, but their form spectacularly collapsed following what the club considered to be an "unwarranted approach" from Everton over head coach Marco Silva. The Hornets eventually pulled themselves over the finish line after a change of manager, but at the cost of question marks over the club's managerial turnover and their stability in the top-flight.

West Bromwich Albion finished bottom, ending a run of eight years among the elite – a 20-game winless run from mid-August to January, and only winning just once after that left them rooted to last place, but a late run of form under caretaker manager Darren Moore that saw the Baggies take 11 points from their last six matches at least saw them go down fighting, with relegation not being confirmed until the penultimate round of games. Stoke City finished just above them, bringing to an end a decade in the Premier League. The Potters' downfall ultimately proved to be both an anaemic goal record and an inability to see out a win, having dropped 19 points from winning positions all season and only finishing above West Brom with a final-day win. The final spot was taken by Swansea City, who endured their worst season since promotion in 2011. The Swans appeared to have been rejuvenated by the arrival of Portuguese manager Carlos Carvalhal after Christmas, but a loss of form in their last ten matches saw the Welsh club overtaken by FA Cup semi-finalists Southampton, who endured a horrendous league season but stayed up thanks in part to the late appointment of Mark Hughes.

Pos	Team	Pld	W	D	L	GF	GA	GD	Pts	Qualification or relegation
1	Manchester City (C)	38	32	4	2	106	27	+79	100	Qualification for the Champions League group stage
2	Manchester United	38	25	6	7	68	28	+40	81	Qualification for the Champions League group stage
3	Tottenham Hotspur	38	23	8	7	74	36	+38	77	Qualification for the Champions League group stage
4	Liverpool	38	21	12	5	84	38	+46	75	Qualification for the Champions League group stage
5	Chelsea	38	21	7	10	62	38	+24	70	Qualification for the Europa League group stage (Note: Since the winners of the 2017–18 FA Cup (Chelsea) and the winners of the 2017–18 EFL Cup (Manchester City) both qualified for European competition based on their league positions, the berths awarded to the 5th-placed team (Europa League group stage) and the League Cup winners (Europa League second qualifying round) were passed down the league.)
6	Arsenal	38	19	6	13	74	51	+23	63	Qualification for the Europa League group stage
7	Burnley	38	14	12	12	36	39	−3	54	Qualification for the Europa League second qualifying round
8	Everton	38	13	10	15	44	58	−14	49	
9	Leicester City	38	12	11	15	56	60	−4	47	
10	Newcastle United	38	12	8	18	39	47	−8	44	
11	Crystal Palace	38	11	11	16	45	55	−10	44	
12	Bournemouth	38	11	11	16	45	61	−16	44	
13	West Ham United	38	10	12	16	48	68	−20	42	
14	Watford	38	11	8	19	44	64	−20	41	
15	Brighton & Hove Albion	38	9	13	16	34	54	−20	40	
16	Huddersfield Town	38	9	10	19	28	58	−30	37	
17	Southampton	38	7	15	16	37	56	−19	36	
18	Swansea City (R)	38	8	9	21	28	56	−28	33	Relegation to EFL Championship
19	Stoke City (R)	38	7	12	19	35	68	−33	33	Relegation to EFL Championship
20	West Bromwich Albion (R)	38	6	13	19	31	56	−25	31	Relegation to EFL Championship

Source: Premier League
Rules for classification: 1) Points; 2) Goal difference; 3) Goals scored. 4) Play-offs (only if needed to decide champion, teams for relegation or teams for UEFA competitions).
(C) Champions; (R) Relegated

==== Championship ====
Following successive seasons of struggle and near-misses with relegation, Wolverhampton Wanderers ended their six-year absence from the Premier League in style, leading the table from Halloween onwards and giving Portuguese head coach Nuno Espírito Santo both promotion and the Championship title in his first season in charge. The fight for second place went down to the last round of games, but it was ultimately Cardiff City who emerged victorious and returned to the top-flight for the first time since 2014, earning manager Neil Warnock a record eighth promotion, as his mixed team of young players and journeymen ensured a Welsh presence in the top-flight next season. Taking the final spot through the playoffs were Fulham, who had been relegated to the second-tier alongside Cardiff in 2014, as they defeated Aston Villa in the playoff final at Wembley, their first visit to the stadium since 1975. This gave Serbian manager Slaviša Jokanović his second promotion to the Premier League in four seasons, having previously won promotion with Watford (albeit leaving the Hornets just weeks later) in 2015.

While a poor run of form in both December and the end of April ended their hopes of a second successive promotion, Sheffield United's first season in the second tier since 2011 proved to be an excellent one as they remained in the promotion chase for practically the entire season. Leeds United spent the first half of the season looking to build on their play-offs near-miss the previous year, but an appalling second half of the season - only bottom-placed Sunderland earned fewer points after Christmas - saw them crash down the table, with only their strong early form and a couple of late wins keeping them from being involved in the relegation struggle. Both Reading and Sheffield Wednesday endured tough seasons after narrowly missing out on promotion the previous year, with only a change of manager for the two teams helping them avoid the drop into League One. Amid off-pitch struggles and growing anger towards owner Assem Allam, a fine second half of the campaign helped Hull City avoid a second successive relegation in a season awash with 140 goals, where they massively leaked goals but had no problem scoring them either – managing to score more than second-placed Cardiff City in the process.

At the bottom of the table, Sunderland endured a second successive relegation and fell into the third tier for the first time in 30 years with just seven wins all season and an inability to turn any one of their staggering 16 draws into wins contributing to their downfall, despite the managerial presence of former Wales manager Chris Coleman. In a battle that went down to the closing minutes of the season, the remaining relegation spots were filled by Burton Albion and Barnsley, who both returned to League One after two seasons in the second tier; despite the Brewers securing three wins from their final four matches and the Tykes actually starting their final match at Derby County outside the bottom three, both were relegated, mainly because of the heroics of Bolton Wanderers, who scored two late goals in two minutes to survive and relegate their fellow strugglers, a remarkable achievement considering their failure to win any of their first 11 matches after promotion the previous season.

Pos	Team	Pld	W	D	L	GF	GA	GD	Pts	Promotion, qualification or relegation
1	Wolverhampton Wanderers (C, P)	46	30	9	7	82	39	+43	99	Promotion to the Premier League
2	Cardiff City (P)	46	27	9	10	69	39	+30	90	Promotion to the Premier League
3	Fulham (O, P)	46	25	13	8	79	46	+33	88	Qualification for Championship play-offs (Note: Four teams play for one spot and promotion to the Premier League.)
4	Aston Villa	46	24	11	11	72	42	+30	83	Qualification for Championship play-offs
5	Middlesbrough	46	22	10	14	67	45	+22	76	Qualification for Championship play-offs
6	Derby County	46	20	15	11	70	48	+22	75	Qualification for Championship play-offs
7	Preston North End	46	19	16	11	57	46	+11	73	
8	Millwall	46	19	15	12	56	45	+11	72	
9	Brentford	46	18	15	13	62	52	+10	69	
10	Sheffield United	46	20	9	17	62	55	+7	69	
11	Bristol City	46	17	16	13	67	58	+9	67	
12	Ipswich Town	46	17	9	20	57	60	−3	60	
13	Leeds United	46	17	9	20	59	64	−5	60	
14	Norwich City	46	15	15	16	49	60	−11	60	
15	Sheffield Wednesday	46	14	15	17	59	60	−1	57	
16	Queens Park Rangers	46	15	11	20	58	70	−12	56	
17	Nottingham Forest	46	15	8	23	51	65	−14	53	
18	Hull City	46	11	16	19	70	70	0	49	
19	Birmingham City	46	13	7	26	38	68	−30	46	
20	Reading	46	10	14	22	48	70	−22	44	
21	Bolton Wanderers	46	10	13	23	39	74	−35	43	
22	Barnsley (R)	46	9	14	23	48	72	−24	41	Relegation to EFL League One
23	Burton Albion (R)	46	10	11	25	38	81	−43	41	Relegation to EFL League One
24	Sunderland (R)	46	7	16	23	52	80	−28	37	Relegation to EFL League One

Source: English Football League
Rules for classification: 1) Points; 2) Goal difference; 3) Number of goals scored
(C) Champions; (O) Play-off winners; (P) Promoted; (R) Relegated

==== League One ====
For the second time in three years, Wigan Athletic won the League One title and returned to the Championship at the first attempt in style, having never looked like falling out of the top two all season and breaking their previous points total from 2016. Also achieving promotion were Blackburn Rovers, who finally enjoyed some success after two relegations in five years as they also made an immediate return to the Championship. In a tightly contested play-off final that went all the way to extra time, Rotherham United scraped past Shrewsbury Town to make it a hat-trick of immediate returns to the second tier – in almost exactly the same fashion they had won promotion to the second tier four years previously. This meant that for the first time ever since three clubs were allowed promotion in 1974, all three clubs relegated from the Championship the previous season were promoted the following season.

Portsmouth continued their gradual climb back up the Football League by achieving a top-half finish, never being remotely threatened by an immediate relegation back to League Two. While they narrowly missed out on a second promotion in a row with only one win in their final six games, the signs were promising for the South-Coast club in their first season of ownership under former Walt Disney executive Michael Eisner. AFC Wimbledon, despite remaining in a relegation battle all season long and having won just five games between August and December, were able to secure a third successive season in the third tier – and also finished above rivals Milton Keynes Dons for the first time in their history, while also ensuring that the following season they would be playing in a higher division than the Dons for the first time.

Three years after gaining promotion to League One, Bury finally ran out of luck and were the first team in the division to suffer relegation, winning just eight times. Having been tipped to regain the form that saw them enter the Championship three years previously, Milton Keynes Dons ultimately fared little better and fell into the bottom tier for the first time in a decade, changing managers three times and finishing well below rivals AFC Wimbledon as a result. Just two years after winning promotion to League One, Northampton Town's struggles continued as they fell back into the bottom tier of the Football League, with the worst defence in the division playing a big role. Taking the last spot in the last game were Oldham Athletic, who finally succumbed to the relegation they had been fighting against for the last couple of years, and fell into the bottom tier of the Football League for the first time in 47 years, also making this the first time since 1997 that they would be playing in anything other than the third tier. Both teams went down playing each other (and drawing 2–2), with Rochdale surviving by a single point.

Pos	Team	Pld	W	D	L	GF	GA	GD	Pts	Promotion, qualification or relegation
1	Wigan Athletic (C, P)	46	29	11	6	89	29	+60	98	Promotion to the EFL Championship
2	Blackburn Rovers (P)	46	28	12	6	82	40	+42	96	Promotion to the EFL Championship
3	Shrewsbury Town	46	25	12	9	60	39	+21	87	Qualification for League One play-offs (Note: Four teams play for one spot and promotion to the EFL Championship.)
4	Rotherham United (O, P)	46	24	7	15	73	53	+20	79	Qualification for League One play-offs
5	Scunthorpe United	46	19	17	10	65	50	+15	74	Qualification for League One play-offs
6	Charlton Athletic	46	20	11	15	58	51	+7	71	Qualification for League One play-offs
7	Plymouth Argyle	46	19	11	16	58	59	−1	68	
8	Portsmouth	46	20	6	20	57	56	+1	66	
9	Peterborough United	46	17	13	16	68	60	+8	64	
10	Southend United	46	17	12	17	58	62	−4	63	
11	Bradford City	46	18	9	19	57	67	−10	63	
12	Blackpool	46	15	15	16	60	55	+5	60	
13	Bristol Rovers	46	16	11	19	60	66	−6	59	
14	Fleetwood Town	46	16	9	21	59	68	−9	57	
15	Doncaster Rovers	46	13	17	16	52	52	0	56	
16	Oxford United	46	15	11	20	61	66	−5	56	
17	Gillingham	46	13	17	16	50	55	−5	56	
18	AFC Wimbledon	46	13	14	19	47	58	−11	53	
19	Walsall	46	13	13	20	53	66	−13	52	
20	Rochdale	46	11	18	17	49	57	−8	51	
21	Oldham Athletic (R)	46	11	17	18	58	75	−17	50	Relegation to EFL League Two
22	Northampton Town (R)	46	12	11	23	43	77	−34	47	Relegation to EFL League Two
23	Milton Keynes Dons (R)	46	11	12	23	43	69	−26	45	Relegation to EFL League Two
24	Bury (R)	46	8	12	26	41	71	−30	36	Relegation to EFL League Two

Source: BBC Sport
Rules for classification: 1) Points; 2) Goal difference; 3) Number of goals scored
(C) Champions; (O) Play-off winners; (P) Promoted; (R) Relegated

==== League Two ====
Just 12 years after returning to the Football League, Accrington Stanley won promotion to the third tier for the first time in their history (their forerunners having last played in the third tier in 1960), an outstanding second half of the season propelling them from mid-table to the title – and securing promotion on the 130th anniversary of the Lancashire club's founding. Also going up were Luton Town, whose steady climb back up the Football League saw them return to League One for the first time in a decade; while a loss of form cost them the title having led the table for large periods of the season, the club saved some grace by being the highest-scoring team in the division. Taking the third automatic promotion spot in what proved to be a tight race were Wycombe Wanderers, who ended their six-year stay in League Two and finally gave manager Gareth Ainsworth the promotion he had sought after years of heart-break. The final promotion spot via the play-offs was filled by Coventry City, who secured an immediate return to League One in a season that saw them finish in the top six for the first time since 1970 and end a 51-year wait to achieve promotion - at the expense of Exeter City, the club losing in the play-off final for the second season running.

Notts County enjoyed what proved to be their most successful season since winning promotion to League One in 2010 as they remained in the promotion race for the whole season, only missing out on a place in the play-off final after a controversial loss to Coventry City; furthermore, player-manager Kevin Nolan became the first Magpies manager to last a full season in charge for nine years. Lincoln City's first season back in the Football League since 2011 proved to be very successful as they not only attempted a second consecutive promotion by qualifying for the play-offs (losing to Exeter City), but they also won the Football League Trophy – beating Shrewsbury Town on their first ever visit to Wembley. A sharp downturn in form that saw them fail to win for 21 games resulted in Grimsby Town having to battle to keep their place in League Two, with only four late wins towards the end of the season helping them stay up. Having been tipped for immediate relegation, Forest Green Rovers achieved survival in their first ever season in the Football League – while a few heavy losses in the opening months left them stuck in the relegation zone, several bursts of good form at key stages in the season helped them up the table and secure their place in the closing weeks.

After 97 years as a member of the Football League, Chesterfield's sharp decline in form continued as they endured a second successive relegation, just 4 years after winning promotion to League One; while a good run of form in the winter months gave the club hope, a poor start and an equally poor end to the season cost them their League status. Taking the second spot and enduring their second relegation from League Two in five years were Barnet, despite the return of Martin Allen for the fifth time as manager late in the season; while the club did put up more of a fight to avoid the drop, ending their season only relegated on goal difference, it once again proved to be too late. This made Barnet the first club to be automatically relegated from the Football League on three separate occasions, and the club to have survived the shortest after being promoted from the Conference (not counting Maidstone United, who also lasted just three seasons after promotion, but were forced out of the Football League by bankruptcy rather than being relegated). Morecambe narrowly escaped relegation on goal difference, despite having the weakest goal-scoring record in the division and winning less games than both relegated clubs, while Port Vale avoided a second successive relegation despite winning just twice at the turn of the year.

Pos	Team	Pld	W	D	L	GF	GA	GD	Pts	Promotion, qualification or relegation
1	Accrington Stanley (C, P)	46	29	6	11	76	46	+30	93	Promotion to EFL League One
2	Luton Town (P)	46	25	13	8	94	46	+48	88	Promotion to EFL League One
3	Wycombe Wanderers (P)	46	24	12	10	79	60	+19	84	Promotion to EFL League One
4	Exeter City	46	24	8	14	64	54	+10	80	Qualification for League Two play-offs (Note: Four teams play for one spot and promotion to EFL League One.)
5	Notts County	46	21	14	11	71	48	+23	77	Qualification for League Two play-offs
6	Coventry City (O, P)	46	22	9	15	64	47	+17	75	Qualification for League Two play-offs
7	Lincoln City	46	20	15	11	64	48	+16	75	Qualification for League Two play-offs
8	Mansfield Town	46	18	18	10	67	52	+15	72	
9	Swindon Town	46	20	8	18	67	65	+2	68	
10	Carlisle United	46	17	16	13	62	54	+8	67	
11	Newport County	46	16	16	14	56	58	−2	64	
12	Cambridge United	46	17	13	16	56	60	−4	64	
13	Colchester United	46	16	14	16	53	52	+1	62	
14	Crawley Town	46	16	11	19	58	66	−8	59	
15	Crewe Alexandra	46	17	5	24	62	75	−13	56	
16	Stevenage	46	14	13	19	60	65	−5	55	
17	Cheltenham Town	46	13	12	21	67	73	−6	51	
18	Grimsby Town	46	13	12	21	42	66	−24	51	
19	Yeovil Town	46	12	12	22	59	75	−16	48	
20	Port Vale	46	11	14	21	49	67	−18	47	
21	Forest Green Rovers	46	13	8	25	54	77	−23	47	
22	Morecambe	46	9	19	18	41	56	−15	46	
23	Barnet (R)	46	12	10	24	46	65	−19	46	Relegation to the National League
24	Chesterfield (R)	46	10	8	28	47	83	−36	38	Relegation to the National League

Source: BBC Sport
Rules for classification: 1) Points; 2) Goal difference; 3) Number of goals scored
(C) Champions; (O) Play-off winners; (P) Promoted; (R) Relegated

==== National League Top Division ====
Macclesfield Town were National League champions and won promotion back to League Two after a six-year absence from the Football League. Taking the second promotion spot in the first season to use six play-off places instead of four were Tranmere Rovers, who made amends for their previous play-off final loss the previous year and returned to the Football League after three years, in a tightly contested final with Boreham Wood.

Leyton Orient and Hartlepool were the two teams relegated from the Football League the previous season, and neither achieved particular success, finishing 13th and 15th in the league respectively. Through much of the season, both looked more likely to be relegated again than to challenge for promotion and Hartlepool also endured struggles off the field, nearly going out of business altogether.

Relegated from the league were Guiseley, Chester, Torquay United and Woking. Guiseley finished bottom of the table, picking up just seven wins and conceding the most goals in the league, seeing them relegated back to the National League North three years after being promoted. Chester and Torquay United both suffered financial uncertainty in addition to being relegated, the latter just a few years after having been in the Football League. Woking's relegation was not guaranteed until the final day of the season, when a defeat against Dover ensured they finished one point behind Barrow.

Pos	Team	Pld	W	D	L	GF	GA	GD	Pts	Promotion, qualification or relegation
1	Macclesfield Town (C, P)	46	27	11	8	67	46	+21	92	Promotion to EFL League Two
2	Tranmere Rovers (O, P)	46	24	10	12	78	46	+32	82	Qualification for the National League play-off semi-finals
3	Sutton United	46	23	10	13	67	53	+14	79	Qualification for the National League play-off semi-finals
4	Boreham Wood	46	20	15	11	64	47	+17	75	Qualification for the National League play-off quarter-finals
5	Aldershot Town	46	20	15	11	64	52	+12	75	Qualification for the National League play-off quarter-finals
6	Ebbsfleet United	46	19	17	10	64	50	+14	74	Qualification for the National League play-off quarter-finals
7	AFC Fylde	46	20	13	13	82	56	+26	73	Qualification for the National League play-off quarter-finals
8	Dover Athletic	46	20	13	13	62	44	+18	73	
9	Bromley	46	19	13	14	75	58	+17	70	
10	Wrexham	46	17	19	10	49	39	+10	70	
11	Dagenham & Redbridge	46	19	11	16	69	62	+7	68	
12	Maidenhead United	46	17	13	16	65	66	−1	64	
13	Leyton Orient	46	16	12	18	58	56	+2	60	
14	Eastleigh	46	13	17	16	65	72	−7	56	
15	Hartlepool United	46	14	14	18	53	63	−10	56	
16	FC Halifax Town	46	13	16	17	48	58	−10	55	
17	Gateshead	46	12	18	16	62	58	+4	54	
18	Solihull Moors	46	14	12	20	49	60	−11	54	
19	Maidstone United	46	13	15	18	52	64	−12	54	
20	Barrow	46	11	16	19	51	63	−12	49	
21	Woking (R)	46	13	9	24	55	76	−21	48	Relegation to National League South
22	Torquay United (R)	46	10	12	24	45	73	−28	42	Relegation to National League South
23	Chester (R)	46	8	13	25	42	79	−37	37	Relegation to National League North
24	Guiseley (R)	46	7	12	27	44	89	−45	33	Relegation to National League North

Source: National League official site
Rules for classification: 1) Points; 2) Goal difference; 3) Number of goals scored; 4) Number of matches won; 5) Head-to-head results
(C) Champions; (O) Play-off winners; (P) Promoted; (R) Relegated

=== League play-offs ===
==== Football League play-offs ====
===== EFL Championship =====
====== Final ======
26 May 2018
17:00 BST

Aston Villa	0–1	Fulham
	Report	Cairney 23'

Wembley Stadium, London
Attendance: 85,243
Referee: Anthony Taylor

===== EFL League One =====
====== Final ======
27 May 2018
15:03 BST

Rotherham United	2–1 (a.e.t.)	Shrewsbury Town
Wood 32', 103'	Report	Rodman 58'

Wembley Stadium, London
Attendance: 26,218
Referee: Robert Jones

===== EFL League Two =====
====== Final ======
28 May 2018
15:00 BST

Coventry City	3–1	Exeter City
Willis 49'; Shipley 54'; Grimmer 68'		Edwards 89'

Wembley Stadium, London
Attendance: 50,196
Referee: David Webb

==== National League play-offs ====
===== National League =====
====== Final ======
12 May 2018
15:00

Tranmere Rovers	2–1	Boreham Wood
Cook 6'; Norwood 80'		Andrade 45'

Wembley Stadium, London
Attendance: 16,306

===== National League North =====
====== Final ======
13 May 2018
15:00

Harrogate Town	3–0	Brackley Town

Wetherby Road, Harrogate
Attendance: 3,000

===== National League South =====
====== Final ======
13 May 2018
15:00

Hampton & Richmond Borough	1–1	Braintree Town
Penalties
	3–4

Beveree Stadium, Hampton
Attendance: 3,127

=== Cup competitions ===
==== FA Cup ====
===== Final =====
19 May 2018
17:15 BST

Chelsea	1–0	Manchester United
Hazard 22' (pen.)	Reports

Wembley Stadium, London
Attendance: 87,647
Referee: Michael Oliver (Northumberland)

==== EFL Cup ====
===== Final =====
25 February 2018
16:30 GMT

Arsenal	0–3	Manchester City
	Report	Agüero 18'; Kompany 58'; D. Silva 65'

Wembley Stadium, London
Attendance: 85,671
Referee: Craig Pawson

==== Community Shield ====
6 August 2017
14:00 BST

Arsenal	1–1	Chelsea
Kolašinac 82'	Report	Moses 46'
Penalties
Walcott (penalty scored); Monreal (penalty scored); Oxlade-Chamberlain (penalty scored); Giroud (penalty scored)	4–1	(penalty scored) Cahill; (penalty missed) Courtois; (penalty missed) Morata

Wembley Stadium, London
Attendance: 83,325
Referee: Bobby Madley (West Yorkshire)

==== EFL Trophy ====
===== Final =====
8 April 2018
15:00 BST

Lincoln City	1–0	Shrewsbury Town
Whitehouse 16'	Report

Wembley Stadium, London
Attendance: 41,261
Referee: Gavin Ward

==== FA Trophy ====
===== Final =====
20 May 2018
16:15 BST

Brackley Town	1–1 (a.e.t.)	Bromley
Johnson 90+6' (o.g.)	Report	Bugiel 19'
Penalties
Byrne (penalty missed); Williams (penalty scored); Diggin (penalty scored); Armson (penalty scored); G. Walker (penalty scored); Brown (penalty scored)	5–4	Sutherland (penalty scored); Raymond (penalty scored); Hanlan (penalty scored); Rees (penalty scored); Bugiel (penalty missed); Holland (penalty missed)

Wembley Stadium, London
Attendance: 31,430
Referee: Chris Kavanagh

== Women's football ==
=== Women's Super League ===
==== WSL 1 ====
Pos	Team	Pld	W	D	L	GF	GA	GD	Pts	Qualification
1	Chelsea (C)	18	13	5	0	44	13	+31	44	Qualification for the Champions League knockout phase
2	Manchester City	18	12	2	4	51	17	+34	38	Qualification for the Champions League knockout phase
3	Arsenal	18	11	4	3	38	18	+20	37	
4	Reading	18	9	5	4	40	18	+22	32	
5	Birmingham City	18	9	3	6	30	18	+12	30	
6	Liverpool	18	9	1	8	30	27	+3	28	
7	Sunderland (R)	18	5	1	12	15	40	−25	16	Did not apply for a licence, Relegation to the FA Women's National League
8	Bristol City	18	5	1	12	13	47	−34	16	
9	Everton	18	4	2	12	19	30	−11	14	
10	Yeovil Town	18	0	2	16	2	54	−52	2	

Source: FA WSL
Rules for classification: 1) Points; 2) Goal difference; 3) Number of goals scored
(C) Champions; (R) Relegated

==== WSL 2 ====
Pos	Team	Pld	W	D	L	GF	GA	GD	Pts	Promotion or relegation
1	Doncaster Rovers Belles (C, R)	18	15	2	1	52	15	+37	47	Obtained then gave up Tier 2 licence. Relegation to the Northern Premier Division
2	Brighton & Hove Albion (P)	18	12	1	5	35	26	+9	37	Awarded a Tier 1 licence
3	Millwall Lionesses (Note: Millwall Lionesses had three points deducted for fielding an ineligible player in their first game of the season against Watford.)	18	12	3	3	40	23	+17	36	
4	Durham	18	11	2	5	44	26	+18	35	
5	Sheffield (R)	18	9	1	8	40	31	+9	28	Obtained then gave up Tier 2 licence. Relegation to the Northern Premier Division
6	London Bees	18	6	5	7	29	32	−3	23	
7	Tottenham Hotspur	18	6	4	8	32	34	−2	22	
8	Oxford United (R)	18	3	3	12	24	41	−17	12	Failed to obtain a Tier 2 licence. Relegation to the Southern Premier Division
9	Aston Villa	18	3	2	13	21	40	−19	11	
10	Watford (R)	18	1	1	16	8	57	−49	4	Failed to obtain a Tier 2 licence. Relegation to the Southern Premier Division

Source: FA WSL
Rules for classification: 1) Points; 2) Goal difference; 3) Number of goals scored
(C) Champions; (P) Promoted; (R) Relegated

=== Women's Premier League ===
==== Northern Premier Division ====
Pos	Team	Pld	W	D	L	GF	GA	GD	Pts	Promotion or relegation
1	Blackburn Rovers (C)	22	18	2	2	68	17	+51	56	Qualification for the Championship play-off
2	Leicester City (P)	22	14	4	4	68	32	+36	46	Awarded a FA Women's Championship licence through application
3	Middlesbrough	22	14	0	8	63	52	+11	42	
4	Stoke City	22	12	4	6	52	38	+14	40	
5	Fylde Ladies	22	10	6	6	35	35	0	36	
6	Huddersfield Town	22	10	5	7	45	27	+18	35	
7	Derby County	22	7	5	10	27	37	−10	26	
8	Bradford City	22	7	4	11	40	45	−5	25	
9	Nottingham Forest	22	5	4	13	23	57	−34	19	
10	Guiseley Vixens	22	4	5	13	33	56	−23	17	
11	Wolverhampton Wanderers (R)	22	4	5	13	30	56	−26	17	Relegation to the Division One Midlands
12	West Bromwich Albion (R)	22	4	2	16	27	59	−32	14	Relegation to the Division One Midlands

Source: FA Full-Time
Rules for classification: 1) Points; 2) Goal difference; 3) Number of goals scored
(C) Champions; (P) Promoted; (R) Relegated

==== Southern Premier Division ====
Pos	Team	Pld	W	D	L	GF	GA	GD	Pts	Promotion or relegation
1	Charlton Athletic (C, O, P)	22	20	0	2	98	13	+85	60	Qualification for the Championship play-off
2	C & K Basildon	22	17	1	4	51	24	+27	52	
3	Crystal Palace (P)	22	16	2	4	59	15	+44	50	Awarded a FA Women's Championship licence through application
4	Coventry United	22	14	2	6	69	20	+49	44	
5	Lewes (P)	22	14	2	6	45	25	+20	44	Awarded a FA Women's Championship licence through application
6	Portsmouth	22	12	1	9	44	35	+9	37	
7	West Ham United (P)	22	9	2	11	57	42	+15	29	Awarded a FA WSL licence through application
8	Chichester City	22	8	4	10	43	48	−5	28	
9	Gillingham	22	5	2	15	24	53	−29	17	
10	Cardiff City	22	4	4	14	40	69	−29	16	
11	Queens Park Rangers	22	2	2	18	17	94	−77	8	
12	Swindon Town (R)	22	0	0	22	10	119	−109	0	Relegation to Division One South West

Source: FA Full-Time
Rules for classification: 1) Points; 2) Goal difference; 3) Number of goals scored
(C) Champions; (O) Play-off winners; (P) Promoted; (R) Relegated

==== Division One North ====
Pos	Team	Pld	W	D	L	GF	GA	GD	Pts	Promotion or relegation
1	Hull City (C, P)	22	17	3	2	66	14	+52	54	Promotion to the Northern Premier Division
2	Brighouse Town	22	16	2	4	60	30	+30	50	
3	Liverpool Marshall Feds	22	14	4	4	48	18	+30	46	
4	Bolton Wanderers	22	11	1	10	38	38	0	34	
5	Newcastle United	22	9	3	10	44	47	−3	30	
6	Chorley	22	9	2	11	41	41	0	29	
7	Morecambe	22	9	2	11	49	60	−11	29	
8	Crewe Alexandra	22	7	5	10	30	33	−3	26	
9	Chester-le-Street	22	8	1	13	35	49	−14	25	
10	Leeds United	22	7	2	13	26	43	−17	23	
11	Barnsley	22	4	5	13	32	64	−32	17	
12	Mossley Hill (R)	22	5	2	15	28	60	−32	17	Relegation from the Premier League

Source: FA Full-Time
Rules for classification: 1) Points; 2) Goal difference; 3) Number of goals scored
(C) Champions; (P) Promoted; (R) Relegated

==== Division One Midlands ====
Pos	Team	Pld	W	D	L	GF	GA	GD	Pts	Promotion or relegation
1	Loughborough Foxes (C, P)	22	21	1	0	91	9	+82	64	Promotion to the Northern Premier Division
2	Burton Albion	22	15	2	5	54	32	+22	47	
3	Sheffield United (P)	22	13	7	2	79	24	+55	46	Awarded a FA Women's Championship licence through application
4	Radcliffe Olympic	22	13	2	7	51	31	+20	41	
5	The New Saints	22	12	3	7	76	45	+31	39	
6	Long Eaton United	22	10	1	11	38	39	−1	31	
7	Solihull	22	9	3	10	55	47	+8	30	
8	Sporting Khalsa	22	8	2	12	40	39	+1	26	
9	Birmingham & West Midlands	22	7	3	12	48	52	−4	24	
10	Steel City Wanderers	22	7	2	13	43	73	−30	23	
11	Rotherham United (R)	22	2	1	19	15	114	−99	7	Relegation from the Premier League
12	Leicester City Ladies (R)	22	1	1	20	11	96	−85	4	Relegation from the Premier League

Source: FA Full-Time
Rules for classification: 1) Points; 2) Goal difference; 3) Number of goals scored
(C) Champions; (P) Promoted; (R) Relegated

==== Division One South East ====
Pos	Team	Pld	W	D	L	GF	GA	GD	Pts	Promotion or relegation
1	Milton Keynes Dons (C, P)	22	18	3	1	76	18	+58	57	Promotion to the Southern Premier Division
2	AFC Wimbledon	22	17	1	4	68	25	+43	52	
3	Ipswich Town	22	15	3	4	76	26	+50	48	
4	Leyton Orient	22	12	3	7	59	33	+26	39	
5	Luton Town	22	11	2	9	66	39	+27	35	
6	Stevenage	22	9	4	9	48	37	+11	31	
7	Actonians	22	9	3	10	56	32	+24	30	
8	Cambridge United	22	8	6	8	40	28	+12	30	
9	Denham United	22	5	7	10	38	47	−9	22	
10	Enfield Town	22	5	5	12	31	50	−19	20	
11	Norwich City	22	4	1	17	39	81	−42	13	
12	Haringey Borough (R)	22	0	0	22	15	196	−181	0	Relegation from the Premier League

Source: FA Full-Time
Rules for classification: 1) Points; 2) Goal difference; 3) Number of goals scored
(C) Champions; (P) Promoted; (R) Relegated

==== Division One South West ====
Pos	Team	Pld	W	D	L	GF	GA	GD	Pts	Promotion or relegation
1	Plymouth Argyle (C, P)	18	16	2	0	100	12	+88	50	Promotion to the Southern Premier Division
2	Southampton Women	18	15	2	1	68	20	+48	47	
3	Keynsham Town	18	13	1	4	82	25	+57	40	
4	Southampton Saints	18	12	2	4	38	20	+18	38	
5	Poole Town	18	6	2	10	32	46	−14	20	
6	Brislington	18	5	3	10	25	51	−26	18	
7	Larkhall Athletic	18	4	2	12	21	50	−29	14	
8	Maidenhead United	18	4	2	12	17	52	−35	14	
9	Cheltenham Town	18	3	1	14	17	58	−41	10	
10	St Nicholas	18	3	1	14	18	84	−66	10	
11	Basingstoke (X)	0	0	0	0	0	0	0	0	Resigned from league. Record expunged.

Source: FA Full-Time
Rules for classification: 1) Points; 2) Goal difference; 3) Number of goals scored
(C) Champions; (P) Promoted; (X) Resigned

=== FA Women's Cup ===
==== Final ====
5 May 2018
17:30 BST

Arsenal	1–3	Chelsea
Miedema 73'	Report	Bachmann 48', 60'; Kirby 76'

Wembley Stadium, London
Attendance: 45,423
Referee: Lindsey Robinson (Durham)

=== FA WSL Cup ===
==== Final ====
14 March 2018
19:00 GMT (UTC+00:00)

Arsenal	1–0	Manchester City
Miedema 32'	Report

Adams Park, High Wycombe
Attendance: 2,136
Referee: Amy Fearn (Derbyshire)

== Managerial changes ==
This is a list of changes of managers within English league football:

Team	Outgoing manager	Manner of departure	Date of departure	Position in table	Incoming manager	Date of appointment
Norwich City	(Scotland) Alan Irvine	End of caretaker spell	7 May 2017	Pre-season	(Germany) Daniel Farke	25 May 2017
Middlesbrough	(England) Steve Agnew	End of caretaker spell	21 May 2017	Pre-season	(England) Garry Monk	9 June 2017
Sunderland	(Scotland) David Moyes	Resigned	22 May 2017	Pre-season	(England) Simon Grayson	29 June 2017
Crystal Palace	(England) Sam Allardyce	Retired	24 May 2017	Pre-season	(Netherlands) Frank de Boer	26 June 2017
Leeds United	(England) Garry Monk	Resigned	25 May 2017	Pre-season	(Spain) Thomas Christiansen	15 June 2017
Hull City	(Portugal) Marco Silva	End of contract	25 May 2017	Pre-season	(Russia) Leonid Slutsky	9 June 2017
Watford	(Italy) Walter Mazzarri	Mutual consent	25 May 2017	Pre-season	(Portugal) Marco Silva	27 May 2017
Wolverhampton Wanderers	(Scotland) Paul Lambert	Mutual consent	30 May 2017	Pre-season	(Portugal) Nuno Espírito Santo	31 May 2017
Wigan Athletic	(England) Graham Barrow	End of caretaker spell	31 May 2017	Pre-season	(England) Paul Cook	31 May 2017
Portsmouth	(England) Paul Cook	Signed by Wigan Athletic	31 May 2017	Pre-season	(Wales) Kenny Jackett	2 June 2017
Southampton	(France) Claude Puel	Sacked	14 June 2017	Pre-season	(Argentina) Mauricio Pellegrino	23 June 2017
Oxford United	(England) Michael Appleton	Signed by Leicester City	20 June 2017	Pre-season	(Spain) Pep Clotet	30 June 2017
Preston North End	(England) Simon Grayson	Signed by Sunderland	29 June 2017	Pre-season	(Scotland) Alex Neil	4 July 2017
Northampton Town	(England) Justin Edinburgh	Sacked	31 August 2017	24th	(Netherlands) Jimmy Floyd Hasselbaink	4 September 2017
Crystal Palace	(Netherlands) Frank de Boer	Sacked	11 September 2017	19th	(England) Roy Hodgson	12 September 2017
Birmingham City	(England) Harry Redknapp	Mutual consent	16 September 2017	22nd	(England) Steve Cotterill	29 September 2017
Chesterfield	(Scotland) Gary Caldwell	Sacked	16 September 2017	23rd	(England) Jack Lester	29 September 2017
Port Vale	(England) Michael Brown	Mutual consent	16 September 2017	24th	(England) Neil Aspin	4 October 2017
Gillingham	(England) Adrian Pennock	Mutual consent	25 September 2017	22nd	(Wales) Steve Lovell	16 November 2017
Oldham Athletic	(Republic of Ireland) John Sheridan	Mutual consent	25 September 2017	24th	(England) Richie Wellens	18 October 2017
Leicester City	(England) Craig Shakespeare	Sacked	17 October 2017	18th	(France) Claude Puel	25 October 2017
Everton	(Netherlands) Ronald Koeman	Sacked	23 October 2017	18th	(England) Sam Allardyce	30 November 2017
Bury	(England) Lee Clark	Sacked	30 October 2017	23rd	(England) Chris Lucketti	22 November 2017
Sunderland	(England) Simon Grayson	Sacked	31 October 2017	22nd	(Wales) Chris Coleman	17 November 2017
West Ham United	(Croatia) Slaven Bilić	Sacked	6 November 2017	18th	(Scotland) David Moyes	7 November 2017
Barnet	(England) Rossi Eames	Became youth coach	14 November 2017	23rd	(Scotland) Mark McGhee	14 November 2017
West Bromwich Albion	(Wales) Tony Pulis	Sacked	20 November 2017	17th	(England) Alan Pardew	30 November 2017
Hull City	(Russia) Leonid Slutsky	Mutual consent	3 December 2017	20th	(England) Nigel Adkins	7 December 2017
Swansea City	(England) Paul Clement	Sacked	20 December 2017	20th	(Spain) Carlos Carvalhal	28 December 2017
Middlesbrough	(England) Garry Monk	Sacked	23 December 2017	9th	(Wales) Tony Pulis	26 December 2017
Sheffield Wednesday	(Spain) Carlos Carvalhal	Mutual consent	24 December 2017	15th	(Netherlands) Jos Luhukay	5 January 2018
Nottingham Forest	(England) Mark Warburton	Sacked	31 December 2017	14th	(Spain) Aitor Karanka	8 January 2018
Stoke City	(Wales) Mark Hughes	Sacked	6 January 2018	18th	(Scotland) Paul Lambert	15 January 2018
Bury	(England) Chris Lucketti	Sacked	15 January 2018	24th	(England) Ryan Lowe	15 January 2018
Barnet	(Scotland) Mark McGhee	Became Director of Football	15 January 2018	24th	(England) Graham Westley	15 January 2018
Southend United	(England) Phil Brown	Mutual consent	17 January 2018	18th	(England) Chris Powell	23 January 2018
Milton Keynes Dons	(Scotland) Robbie Neilson	Mutual consent	20 January 2018	21st	(England) Dan Micciche	23 January 2018
Watford	(Portugal) Marco Silva	Sacked	21 January 2018	10th	(Spain) Javi Gracia	21 January 2018
Oxford United	(Spain) Pep Clotet	Sacked	22 January 2018	10th	(England) Karl Robinson	22 March 2018
Leeds United	(Spain) Thomas Christiansen	Sacked	4 February 2018	10th	(England) Paul Heckingbottom	6 February 2018
Bradford City	(Scotland) Stuart McCall	Sacked	5 February 2018	6th	(England) Simon Grayson	11 February 2018
Barnsley	(England) Paul Heckingbottom	Signed by Leeds United	6 February 2018	21st	(Portugal) José Morais	16 February 2018
Cambridge United	(England) Shaun Derry	Mutual consent	9 February 2018	15th	(England) Joe Dunne	2 May 2018
Grimsby Town	(England) Russell Slade	Sacked	11 February 2018	18th	(England) Michael Jolley	2 March 2018
Fleetwood Town	(Germany) Uwe Rösler	Sacked	17 February 2018	20th	(Republic of Ireland) John Sheridan	22 February 2018
Peterborough United	(Northern Ireland) Grant McCann	Sacked	25 February 2018	10th	(Scotland) Steve Evans	28 February 2018
Mansfield Town	(Scotland) Steve Evans	Signed by Peterborough United	27 February 2018	5th	(England) David Flitcroft	1 March 2018
Swindon Town	(England) David Flitcroft	Signed by Mansfield Town	1 March 2018	7th	(England) Phil Brown	12 March 2018
Arsenal	(France) Arsène Wenger	Resigned	13 May 2018	Pre-season	(Spain) Unai Emery	23 May 2018
Everton	(England) Sam Allardyce	Sacked	16 May 2018	Pre-season	(Portugal) Marco Silva	31 May 2018
West Ham United	(Scotland) David Moyes	End of contract	16 May 2018	Pre-season	(Chile) Manuel Pellegrini	22 May 2018

== Clubs removed ==
- Dorking F.C. were dissolved after competing in the 2016–17 Combined Counties Football League 1st Division (level 10).
- Ilkeston F.C. were wound up after being relegated from the 2016–17 Northern Premier League Premier Division (level 7).

== New clubs ==
- Ilkeston Town F.C. join the 2017–18 Midland Football League Division One.

== Deaths ==
- 1 June 2017: Ernie Ackerley, 73, Barrow forward.
- 2 June 2017: Tony Potrac, 64, Chelsea winger.
- 2 June 2017: Ralph Wetton, 89, Tottenham Hotspur, Plymouth Argyle and Aldershot wing half.
- 5 June 2017: Cheick Tioté, 30, Ivory Coast and Newcastle United midfielder.
- 18 June 2017: Albert Franks, 81, Newcastle United and Lincoln City wing half.
- 21 June 2017: Ray Smith, 88, Luton Town and Southend United wing-half.
- 26 June 2017: John Groves, 83, Luton Town wing-half.
- June 2017: Des Collins, 94, Chesterfield, Halifax Town, Carlisle United, Barrow, Bournemouth & Boscombe Athletic, Shrewsbury Town and Accrington Stanley winger.
- June 2017: John Higgins, 87, Swindon Town defender.
- June 2017: Matt Crowe, 84, Norwich City and Brentford wing-half.
- June 2017: Peter Bircumshaw, 78, Notts County, Bradford City and Stockport County forward.
- 2 July 2017: John McCormick, 80, Crystal Palace centre back.
- 5 July 2017: John McKenzie, 91, Scotland and Bournemouth & Boscombe Athletic outside right.
- c.5 July 2017: Ray Chadwick, 82, referee.
- 7 July 2017: Tony Moore, 69, Chesterfield and Chester winger.
- c.7 July 2017: Ken Wimshurst, 79, Gateshead, Southampton and Bristol City right-half.
- 15 July 2017: Davie Laing, 92, Gillingham wing half.
- 26 July 2017: Jimmy White, 75, Bournemouth & Boscombe Athletic, Portsmouth, Gillingham and Cambridge United centre half.
- 7 July 2017: Ray Barnard, 84, Middlesbrough and Lincoln City full back.
- 2 August 2017: Dave Caldwell, 85, Rotherham United left back.
- 8 August 2017: Mike Deakin, 83, Crystal Palace, Northampton Town and Aldershot forward.
- 10 August 2017: Alec Eisenträger, 90, Bristol City inside forward.
- 21 August 2017: Bill Green, 66, Hartlepool United, Carlisle United, West Ham United, Peterborough United, Chesterfield and Doncaster Rovers centre half, who also managed Scunthorpe United and was a prominent scout for many clubs.
- 24 August 2017: Alan Boswell, 74, Walsall, Shrewsbury Town, Wolverhampton Wanderers, Bolton Wanderers and Port Vale goalkeeper.
- 13 September 2017: Derek Wilkinson, 82, Sheffield Wednesday winger.
- 22 September 2017: John Worsdale, 68, Stoke City and Lincoln City winger.
- 3 October 2017: Les Mutrie, 66, Carlisle United, Hull City, Colchester United and Hartlepool United striker.
- 6 October 2017: Ian McNeill, 85, Leicester City, Brighton & Hove Albion and Southend United inside forward, who also managed Wigan Athletic and Shrewsbury Town.
- 9 October 2017: Jimmy Reid, 81, Bury and Stockport County inside forward.
- 11 October 2017: Dick Hewitt, 74, Bradford City, Barnsley and York City midfielder.
- 19 October 2017: Brian Riley, 80, Bolton Wanderers winger
- c. 27 October 2017: Andy Reid, 55, Bury defender.
- 5 November 2017: Dionatan Teixeira, 25, Fleetwood Town and Stoke City defender.
- 23 November 2017: Allan Harris, 74, Chelsea, Coventry City, Queens Park Rangers, Plymouth Argyle and Cambridge United defender.
- 27 November 2017: Dermot Drummy, 56, former Crawley Town manager, who also coached at Chelsea and played for Blackpool.
- November 2017: Tommy Farrer, 94, Great Britain Olympic footballer.
- 3 December 2017: Ian Twitchin, 65, Torquay United midfielder.
- 22 December 2017: Cyril Beavon, 80, Oxford United defender.
- 26 December 2017: Willie Penman, 78, Newcastle United, Swindon Town and Walsall inside forward.
- 30 December 2017: John Faulkner, 69, Leeds United and Luton Town defender.
- December 2017: Steve Piper, 64, Brighton and Hove Albion and Portsmouth defender and midfielder.
- 2 January 2018: Alan Deakin, 76, Aston Villa and Walsall wing half.
- 3 January 2018: Mike McCartney, 63, Carlisle United, Southampton and Plymouth Argyle full back.
- 6 January 2018: Nigel Sims, 86, Wolverhampton Wanderers, Aston Villa and Peterborough United goalkeeper.
- 8 January 2018: Juan Carlos Garcia, 29, Honduras and Wigan Athletic left back.
- 9 January 2018: Ted Phillips, 84, Ipswich Town, Leyton Orient, Luton Town and Colchester United striker.
- 9 January 2018: Tommy Lawrence, 77, Scotland, Liverpool and Tranmere Rovers goalkeeper.
- 10 January 2018: John McGlashan, 50, Millwall, Peterborough United and Rotherham United midfielder.
- 14 January 2018: Cyrille Regis, 59, England, West Bromwich Albion, Coventry City, Aston Villa, Wolverhampton Wanderers, Wycombe Wanderers and Chester City striker.
- 16 January 2018: Rodney Fern, 69, Leicester City, Luton Town, Chesterfield and Rotherham United striker.
- 22 January 2018: Jimmy Armfield, 82, England and Blackpool right back, who also went on to manage Bolton Wanderers and Leeds United.
- 25 January 2018: Keith Pring, 74, Wales, Newport County, Rotherham United, Notts County and Southport winger.
- 28 January 2018: Paul Alcock, 64, referee.
- 30 January 2018: Vic Keeble, 87, Colchester United, Newcastle United and West Ham United forward.
- 9 February 2018: Liam Miller, 36, Republic of Ireland, Manchester United, Leeds United, Sunderland, Queens Park Rangers midfielder.
- 10 February 2018: Dick Scott, 76, Norwich City, Cardiff City, Scunthorpe United and Lincoln City wing half.
- 22 February 2018: Billy Wilson, 71, Blackburn Rovers and Portsmouth full back.
- 28 February 2018: Kieron Durkan, 44, Wrexham, Stockport County, Macclesfield Town, Rochdale and Swansea City midfielder.
- 3 March 2018: Arthur Stewart, 76, Northern Ireland and Derby County wing half.
- 6 March 2018: John Kurila, 76, Northampton Town, Bristol City, Southend United, Colchester United and Lincoln City wing half.
- c. 7 March 2018: John Molyneux, 72, Chester City and Liverpool right back.
- 10 March 2018: Wally Gould, 79, Sheffield United, York City and Brighton & Hove Albion winger.
- 13 March 2018: Ken Mulhearn, 72, Stockport County, Manchester City, Shrewsbury Town and Crewe Alexandra goalkeeper.
- March 2018: George Meek, 84, Leeds United, Leicester City and Walsall winger.
- 28 March 2018: Bobby Ferguson, 80, Newcastle United, Derby County, Cardiff City and Newport County defender, who also managed Newport and Ipswich Town.
- 28 March 2018: Colin Harper, 71, Ipswich Town defender who was also caretaker-manager at Port Vale.
- 29 March 2018: Ron Mailer, 85, Darlington wing half.
- 30 March 2018: Frank Hodgetts, 93, West Bromwich Albion and Millwall winger.
- 4 April 2018: Ray Wilkins, 61, England, Chelsea, Manchester United, Queens Park Rangers, Crystal Palace, Wycombe Wanderers, Millwall and Leyton Orient midfielder, who also managed Queens Park Rangers, Fulham and Jordan.
- 13 April 2018: Ron Cooper, 79, Peterborough United defender.
- 16 April 2018: Rod Taylor, 74, Portsmouth, Gillingham and Bournemouth & Boscombe Athletic wing half.
- 20 April 2018: Roy Bentley, 93, England, Bristol City, Newcastle United, Chelsea, Fulham and Queens Park Rangers striker, who also managed Reading and Swansea City.
- 20 April 2018: Eddie Blackburn, 61, Hull City, York City and Hartlepool United goalkeeper.
- 26 April 2018: Dick Bate, 71, one time Southend United manager, who had extensive coaching experience over forty years with a number of teams.
- 28 April 2018: George Mulhall, 81, Scotland and Sunderland outside left, who also managed Bradford City, Bolton Wanderers and Halifax Town.
- 9 May 2018: Arthur Fitzsimons, 88, Republic of Ireland, Middlesbrough, Lincoln City and Mansfield Town inside forward.
- 10 May 2018: Ken Hodgkisson, 85, West Bromwich Albion and Walsall inside forward.
- 10 May 2018: Graham Lovett, 70, West Bromwich Albion midfielder.
- 15 May 2018: Jlloyd Samuel, 37, Trinidad & Tobago, Aston Villa and Bolton Wanderers left back.
- 15 May 2018: Ray Wilson, 83, England, Huddersfield Town, Everton, Oldham Athletic and Bradford City left back, who also managed Bradford, and was part of England's FIFA World Cup winning team of 1966.
- 21 May 2018: Franny Firth, 61, Huddersfield Town, Halifax Town and Bury winger.
- May 2018: Tommy McGhee, 89, Portsmouth and Reading full back.
- May 2018: Cliff Jackson, 76, Swindon Town, Crystal Palace, Plymouth Argyle and Torquay United forward.
- 25 May 2018: Phil McKnight, 93, Chelsea and Leyton Orient wing half.
- 28 May 2018: Neale Cooper, 54, Aston Villa and Reading midfielder, who also managed Hartlepool United and Gillingham.

== Retirements ==
- 21 June 2017: Keith Lasley, 37, former Plymouth Argyle midfielder.
- 24 June 2017: Álvaro Arbeloa, 34, former Spain, Liverpool and West Ham United defender.
- 28 June 2017: Scott Parker, 36, former England, Charlton Athletic, Chelsea, Newcastle United, West Ham United, Tottenham Hotspur and Fulham midfielder.
- 29 June 2017: Craig King, 20, former Luton Town goalkeeper.
- July 2017: Royston Drenthe, 30, former Netherlands, Everton, Reading and Sheffield Wednesday winger.
- 3 July 2017: Richie Wellens, 37, former Manchester United, Blackpool, Oldham Athletic, Doncaster Rovers and Leicester City midfielder.
- 7 July 2017: Kevin McNaughton, 34, former Scotland, Cardiff City and Wigan Athletic right back.
- 17 July 2017: Paul Robinson, 37, former England, Leeds United, Tottenham Hotspur, Blackburn Rovers and Burnley goalkeeper.
- 24 July 2017: Thomas Sørensen, 41, former Denmark, Sunderland, Aston Villa and Stoke City goalkeeper.
- 25 July 2017: Michu, 31, former Spain and Swansea City striker.
- 8 August 2017: Mark Hudson, 35, former Crystal Palace, Charlton Athletic, Cardiff City and Huddersfield Town defender.
- 9 August 2017: Jermaine Easter, 35, former Wales, Hartlepool United, Cambridge United, Boston United, Stockport County, Wycombe Wanderers, Plymouth Argyle, Milton Keynes Dons, Crystal Palace, Millwall and Bristol Rovers forward.
- 14 August 2017: Stephen McManus, 34, former Scotland and Middlesbrough centre half.
- 18 August 2017: Víctor Valdés, 35, former Spain, Manchester United and Middlesbrough goalkeeper.
- 6 September 2017: José Enrique, 31, former Newcastle United and Liverpool left back.
- 9 September 2017: Eiður Guðjohnsen, 38, former Iceland, Bolton Wanderers, Chelsea and Stoke City forward.
- 28 September 2017: Kevin Doyle, 34, former Republic of Ireland, Reading and Wolverhampton Wanderers striker.
- 2 October 2017: Damian Scannell, 32, former Southend United, Dagenham & Redbridge, Eastleigh and Sutton United midfielder.
- 2 October 2017: Rickie Lambert, 35, former England, Blackpool, Macclesfield Town, Stockport County, Rochdale, Bristol Rovers, Southampton, Liverpool, West Bromwich Albion and Cardiff City striker.
- 30 October 2017: Kaspars Gorkšs, 35, former Blackpool, Queens Park Rangers, Reading, Wolverhampton Wanderers and Colchester United defender.
- 7 November 2017: Tommy Lee, 31, former Chesterfield, Macclesfield Town and Rochdale goalkeeper.
- 19 November 2017: Rory Fallon, 35, former New Zealand, Barnsley, Swindon Town, Swansea City, Plymouth Argyle, Yeovil Town, Crawley Town, Scunthorpe United, Bristol Rovers, Torquay United, Truro City and Dorchester Town striker.
- 21 November 2017: Kenwyne Jones, 33, former Trinidad and Tobago, Southampton, Sheffield Wednesday, Stoke City, Sunderland, Cardiff City and AFC Bournemouth striker.
- 22 November 2017: Yakubu, 35, former Nigeria, Portsmouth, Middlesbrough, Everton, Leicester City, Blackburn Rovers, Reading and Coventry City striker.
- 23 November 2017: Christian Ribeiro, 27, former Wales, Bristol City, Scunthorpe United, Exeter City and Oxford United defender.
- 20 December 2017: Tomáš Rosický, 37, former Czech Republic and Arsenal midfielder.
- 5 January 2018: Johan Elmander, 36, former Sweden and Bolton Wanderers striker.
- 8 February 2018: Matty Fryatt, 31, former Walsall, Leicester City, Hull City and Nottingham Forest striker.
- 13 February 2018: Ryan Mason, 26, former England, Tottenham Hotspur, Yeovil Town, Doncaster Rovers, Millwall, Swindon Town and Hull City midfielder.
- 14 February 2018: Jamie Slabber, 33, former Tottenham Hotspur and Swindon Town forward.
- 3 March 2018: Damon Lathrope, 28, former Torquay United, Aldershot Town and Woking midfielder.
- 27 March 2018: Adam Yates, 34, former Port Vale, Leek Town and Morecambe defender.
- 18 April 2018: Brian Lenihan, 23, former Hull City defender.
- 28 April 2018: Chris Cohen, 31, former West Ham United, Yeovil Town and Nottingham Forest defender/midfielder.
- 5 May 2018: Stephen Warnock, 36, former England, Liverpool, Blackburn Rovers, Aston Villa, Leeds United, Derby County, Wigan Athletic and Burton Albion left back.
- 6 May 2018: Paul Robinson, 39, former Watford, West Bromwich Albion, Bolton Wanderers and Birmingham City defender.
- 9 May 2018: Simon Church, 29, former Reading, Crewe Alexandra, Yeovil Town, Wycombe Wanderers, Huddersfield Town, Charlton Athletic, Milton Keynes Dons, Scunthorpe United, Plymouth Argyle and Wales forward.
- 9 May 2018: Shaun Barker, 35, former Rotherham United, Blackpool, Derby County and Burton Albion defender.
- 11 May 2018: Leon Britton, 35, former Swansea City and Sheffield United midfielder.
- 14 May 2018: Dean Whitehead, 36, former Oxford United, Sunderland, Stoke City, Middlesbrough and Huddersfield Town midfielder.
- 18 May 2018: Clint Hill, 39, former Tranmere Rovers, Oldham Athletic, Stoke City, Crystal Palace, Queens Park Rangers, Nottingham Forest and Carlisle United defender.
- 24 May 2018: Lloyd Macklin, 26, former Swindon Town and Torquay United attacking midfielder.
- 25 May 2018: Rhoys Wiggins, 30, former Crystal Palace, AFC Bournemouth, Norwich City, Charlton Athletic, Sheffield Wednesday and Birmingham City defender.
