= Hodgetts =

Hodgetts or Hodgett is a surname. Notable people with the surname include:

- Charles Alfred Hodgetts (1859–1952), Canadian doctor
- Chris Hodgetts (born 1950), British racing driver
- David Hodgett (born 1963), Australian politician
- Dennis Hodgetts (1863–1945), English footballer
- Frank Hodgetts (1924–2018), English footballer
- John Hodgetts (1917–2009), Canadian political scientist
- Samuel Hodgetts (1877–1944), British gymnast
- Stefan Hodgetts (born 1982), British racing driver
- Henry Hodgetts-Foley (1828–1894), British MP
- John Hodgetts-Foley (1797–1861), British MP
