= Harry Woodburn Blaylock =

Canadian lawyer and businessman (1878–1928)

Harry Woodburn Blaylock CBE
- Born: January 6, 1878; Quebec, Canada
- Died: January 25, 1928 (aged 50); Montreal, Canada
- Occupations: Lawyer and businessman

Harry Woodburn Blaylock, CBE (January 6, 1878 — January 25, 1928) was a Canadian lawyer and businessman. He was born in Quebec, and graduated from McGill University with a Bachelor of Civil Law in 1903. He married Agnes Georgina Mills on September 30, 1905. In 1907, he moved to London, and became the assistant commissioner of the Canadian Red Cross Society in 1915 and the chief commissioner of the society in 1918. Throughout his life, Blaylock helped construct different types of buildings and aided soldiers during World War I, and received several awards and honours for these tasks. He died at the Royal Victoria Hospital in Montreal, at age 50.

== Early life and education ==
Blaylock was born on January 6, 1878, in Quebec, to his mother Eleanor Marianne Lowndes and his father Thomas Blaylock. Both of his parents were Anglican priests. He and his family moved to Danville, Quebec when he was ten years old. In 1897, Blaylock graduated from Bishop's College School with a Bachelor of Arts degree.

Blaylock became a part of the militia as a Lieutenant, but kept this position for only a year, due to having little interest with military. He studied law at McGill University starting in 1900, and received a Bachelor of Civil Law in 1903, at age 25. He traveled to Paris that same year, and studied law there, and returned to Quebec a year later, where he continued to study law. Blaylock met Agnes Georgina Mills shortly after returning, whom he married on September 30, 1905.

== Career ==
Blaylock stopped studying law in 1907, and moved to London. Here he helped George Alexander Drummond with construction duties. World War I begun in 1914, during which time he helped the Canadian Red Cross Society organization, a Canadian charitable organization, which was led by Charles Alfred Hodgetts at the time and George Alexander's wife was very active in. In 1915, he became the assistant commissioner of the society. Throughout the war, Blaylock aided the Canadian soldiers, providing them a variety of services. At the end of 1916, his efforts resulted in his having to go to a hospital for 3 weeks, due to psychological shock and extreme fatigue.

The Red Cross Society discovered that an attack, now known as the Battle of Vimy Ridge, would occur, which ended up taking place in early April. Blaylock, recovered now, went to the clearing station to the see the thousands of wounded men who were arriving. “Words fail one in trying to describe the horror of it all, but one noticed with wonder and admiration the cheerfulness and self-sacrifice of the wounded. No one seemed so badly hurt but that, in his opinion, the chap next to him was worse, and needed attention first. Men with arms hanging limp were struggling to help men whose legs were wounded; everyone seemed to be thinking of his neighbour," he said.

In April 1918, Blaylock became the chief commissioner of the Canadian Red Cross, as requested by Hodgetts. In June 1919, Blaylock was hit with pleurisy, forcing him to stay in bed until he healed. He became an honorary colonel on October 7, 1918, in the militia of Canada. In 1922, Blaylock went to Montreal, where he eventually became the council of several business companies, such as Montreal Development.

Blaylock helped construct buildings in Quebec during the later part of his life, in Montreal and nearby cities and towns. On January 25, 1928, he died in Montreal, when he was 50 years old. He had been ill for the three weeks preceding his death, and was at the Royal Victoria Hospital when he died. By this time, he and his wife had had a son named Peter Woodburn.

== Awards and honours ==
Blaylock received the following notable awards and honours throughout his life:

- Legion of Honour (knight), on May 2, 1917
- Commander of the Order of the British Empire, on July 7, 1918
- Order of St. Sava, on June 7, 1919
- Legion of Honour (officer), on October 24, 1919
- Sovereign Military Order of Malta, January 7, 1920
- Commander of the Order of the Crown of Italy, on March 8, 1920

== See also ==
- List of Bishop's College School alumni
