= Keith Pring =

Welsh footballer (1943–2018)

Personal information
- Full name: Keith David Pring
- Date of birth: 11 March 1943
- Place of birth: Newport, Wales
- Date of death: 25 January 2018 (aged 74)
- Place of death: Southport, England
- Position: Winger

Senior career*
Years	Team	Apps	(Gls)
1961–1964	Newport County	61	(3)
1964–1968	Rotherham United	83	(6)
1968–1969	Notts County	44	(2)
1969–1971	Southport	48	(4)

International career
1965–1967	Wales	3	(0)
- * Club domestic league appearances and goals

Keith David Pring (11 March 1943 – 25 January 2018) was a Welsh professional footballer and Wales international. As a winger, he began his career as an apprentice at Newport County and made his debut in 1961. He made 61 English Football League appearances for Newport, scoring 3 goals before joining Rotherham United in October 1964 for a fee of £10,000. Pring later moved on to Notts County F.C. and finished his career at Southport due to a bad leg break.

Born in Newport, Monmouthshire, Pring attained 3 caps for the Wales national football team, making his international debut on 1 December 1965 in place of the injured Gil Reece in a 4–2 defeat to Denmark.

Keith had a son Gareth born in Nottingham in 1968 and later a daughter Caroline born in Southport in 1975.

Keith David Pring resided in Churchtown, Southport where he also had seven grandchildren: Emmy, Robert, Will, Max, Zac, Ashleigh and Sam, the latter two being the niece and nephew of former Everton and Chester star Stuart Rimmer.

Pring's former club Rotherham United confirmed they were saddened to learn of his death on Sunday evening.
