= Ron Cooper (English footballer) =

English footballer and manager (1938–2018)

Personal information
- Full name: Ronald Cooper
- Date of birth: 28 August 1938
- Place of birth: Thorney, Peterborough, England
- Date of death: 13 April 2018 (aged 79)
- Place of death: Bourne, England
- Position: Defender

Senior career*
Years	Team	Apps	(Gls)
1958–1968	Peterborough United	144	(1)
- Corby Town
- Stamford Town

Managerial career
- Late 1970s: Bourne Town
- * Club domestic league appearances and goals

Ronald Cooper (28 August 1938 – 13 April 2018) was an English footballer and manager. A two-footed defender who played mainly as a full-back, he was associated with Peterborough United for ten years and made 163 first-team appearances in all competitions, all of them as a starter, scoring once.

Cooper was part of the Peterborough side that reached the sixth round, or quarter-final stage, of the 1964–65 FA Cup. The run included a fourth-round victory over Arsenal, the elimination of Swansea Town and a quarter-final against Chelsea at Stamford Bridge. After leaving Peterborough, he played for Corby Town and Stamford Town, before later managing Bourne Town.

== Playing career ==
=== Peterborough United ===
Cooper made his Peterborough United first-team debut on 18 April 1959. He made 13 first-team appearances during the club's Midland League period between 1958 and 1960, before playing for the reserves in the Football Combination. Although he remained with Peterborough after the club was elected to the Football League, he did not make his Football League debut until the 1963–64 season.

For part of his Peterborough career, Cooper remained a part-time footballer and worked in agriculture. In September 1957, while playing at left-half for Peterborough's A team, Cooper lost a finger while working on a farm in the Deeping area. After receiving hospital treatment, he travelled to Cambridge intending to play for the team later that day, but those in charge of the team refused to allow him to take part. Manager George Swindin described the incident as "a fine example of the lad's club spirit". At one stage, he was the only part-time player in the first-team squad. He was two-footed and able to play across the defence, although he was used primarily as a full-back.

Cooper made 163 first-team appearances for Peterborough in all competitions, starting every match, and scored one goal. His goal came in a 3–2 Third Division defeat away to Coventry City at Highfield Road on 9 November 1963. Cooper opened the scoring after 15 minutes with a shot from approximately 25 yards, following a punched clearance by Coventry goalkeeper Bob Wesson.

=== 1964–65 FA Cup run ===
Cooper was a member of the Peterborough team that reached the sixth round of the 1964–65 FA Cup. In the fourth round, he started at right-back as Third Division Peterborough defeated First Division club Arsenal 2–1 at London Road on 30 January 1965. Arsenal led through John Radford, before goals from Derek Dougan and Peter McNamee gave Peterborough the victory in front of 30,056 spectators.

Peterborough subsequently eliminated Swansea Town in the fifth round to reach the quarter-finals. Cooper again started at right-back in the sixth-round tie against Chelsea at Stamford Bridge on 6 March 1965. Peterborough lost 5–1 in front of 63,635 spectators, with captain Vic Crowe scoring their goal.

=== Benefit match ===
In recognition of ten years' service to Peterborough United, Cooper was granted a benefit match against Derby County at London Road on 1 May 1968. Cooper started the match, which Peterborough led 2–0 at half-time through goals from Jim Hall and Stuart Brace, before Derby recovered to win 4–2 in front of 5,035 spectators. Derby manager Brian Clough appeared as a player in the match and scored one of his side's goals.

=== Later playing career ===
After leaving Peterborough, Cooper spent approximately two seasons with Corby Town. He then played for Stamford Town for four years under manager Norman Rigby, a former Peterborough United defender.

== Managerial career ==
Cooper later moved into football management and managed Bourne Town during the late 1970s.

== Death and legacy ==
Cooper died in Bourne on 13 April 2018, aged 79. In later life, he lived with Parkinson's disease and dementia.

Following his death, his family donated the Ron Cooper Memorial Cup to Stamford. The silver cup became an annual award for a young Stamford footballer between the ages of six and 18, in recognition of Cooper's commitment to local football.
