= Tommy Farrer =

English footballer (1922–2017)

Personal information
- Full name: Leslie Thomas Farrer
- Date of birth: 22 December 1922
- Place of birth: Hoddesdon, England
- Date of death: 16 November 2017 (aged 94)

Senior career*
Years	Team	Apps	(Gls)
1945–1953	Bishop Auckland		
- Walthamstow Avenue

International career
	England amateurs	20	
1956	Great Britain	2	(0)
- * Club domestic league appearances and goals

Leslie Thomas Farrer (22 December 1922 – 16 November 2017) was an English footballer who represented Great Britain at the 1956 Summer Olympics. Farrer played as an amateur for Bishop Auckland and Walthamstow Avenue. Farrer died in November 2017 at the age of 94.
