= Brian Riley (footballer) =

English footballer

Personal information
- Full name: Brian Francis Riley
- Date of birth: 14 September 1937
- Place of birth: Bolton, England
- Date of death: 19 October 2017 (aged 80)
- Place of death: Great Lever, England
- Position: Left winger

Youth career
- Bolton Wanderers

Senior career*
Years	Team	Apps	(Gls)
1956–1959	Bolton Wanderers	8	(1)
- Weymouth
- * Club domestic league appearances and goals

Brian Francis Riley (14 September 1937 – 19 October 2017) was an English professional footballer who played as a left winger.

== Career ==
Born in Bolton, Riley played for Bolton Wanderers, Weymouth, and Buxton. After retiring as a player due to injury he worked as an electrician.

== Personal life ==
Riley had three children and six grandchildren.
