= Tony Potrac =

Australian association football player

Personal information
- Full name: Anthony Joseph Potrac
- Date of birth: 21 January 1953
- Place of birth: Pimlico, London, England
- Date of death: 2 June 2017 (aged 64)
- Place of death: Kent, England
- Height: 1.77 m (5 ft 9 1/2 in)
- Position: Winger

Youth career
- 1968–1972: Chelsea

Senior career*
Years	Team	Apps	(Gls)
1972–1973	Chelsea	1	(0)
1972	→ Notts County (loan)	0	(0)
- Durban City
- Bexley United
- * Club domestic league appearances and goals

Anthony Joseph Potrac (21 January 1953 – 2 June 2017) was an English footballer who played professionally for Chelsea and Durban City in the 1970s as a winger.

== Career ==
Potrac joined Chelsea as a youth player, and featured in a pre-season friendly in 1968 against Wealdstone. He played one professional league game, which came against Huddersfield Town in 1972. After leaving Chelsea, he joined South African side Durban City.

== Death ==
On 2 June 2017, Chelsea announced via Twitter that Potrac had died at the age of 64.
