= Ray Smith (footballer, born 1929) =

English association football player

Personal information
- Full name: Raymond Scorer Smith
- Date of birth: 14 April 1929
- Place of birth: Evenwood, England
- Date of death: 21 June 2017 (aged 88)
- Position: Wing half

Youth career
- –: Basildon Minors

Senior career*
Years	Team	Apps	(Gls)
19??–1950	Evenwood Town		
1950–1957	Luton Town	12	(0)
1957–19??	Southend United	46	(1)
–	Hastings United		
- * Club domestic league appearances and goals

Raymond Scorer Smith (14 April 1929 – 21 June 2017) was an English footballer who played as a wing half in the Football League for Luton Town and Southend United. He also played non-league football for Evenwood Town and Hastings United.
