= Charles Alfred Hodgetts =

Charles Alfred Hodgetts, CMG, VD (23 August 1859 – 3 April 1952) was a Canadian medical doctor and public health official, described in his obituary as the "dean of Canadian public health".

Born in Toronto, Hodgetts was educated at the Toronto Model School, the Ontario College of Pharmacy, Victoria University, and Queen's University. He graduated from the Royal College of Physicians in London in 1888.

He held positions with the Ontario Provincial Board of Health, rising to become its secretary. He was one of the founders of the Canadian Red Cross Society and director of the St John's Ambulance Association. He also served as medical adviser to the federal Commission of Conservation.

During the First World War, Hodgetts served with the Canadian Army Medical Corps, for which he was appointed a CMG in 1917.
