= Frank Hodgetts =

English footballer (1924–2018)

Personal information
- Date of birth: 30 September 1924
- Place of birth: Dudley, England
- Date of death: 27 March 2018 (aged 93)
- Position: Winger

Senior career*
Years	Team	Apps	(Gls)
1940–1949	West Bromwich Albion		
1949–1954	Millwall	37	(6)
	Worcester City	?	(?)
- * Club domestic league appearances and goals

Frank Hodgetts (30 September 1924 – 27 March 2018) was an English footballer who played as a winger in the Football League. He holds the record for the youngest player to play for West Brom, making his debut at the age of 16 years, 26 days vs Notts County, 26 October 1940.

He joined Millwall for a then club record fee of £10,000 in May 1949, making 37 first team appearances before moving onto Worcester City FC in the Summer of 1954.
