= 2018–19 UEFA Youth League group stage =

Football tournament group stage

The 2018–19 UEFA Youth League UEFA Champions League Path (group stage) began on 18 September and concluded on 12 December 2018. A total of 32 teams competed in the group stage of the UEFA Champions League Path to decide 16 of the 24 places in the knockout phase (play-offs and the round of 16 onwards) of the 2018–19 UEFA Youth League.

== Draw ==
The youth teams of the 32 clubs which qualified for the 2018–19 UEFA Champions League group stage entered the UEFA Champions League Path. If there was a vacancy (youth teams not entering), it was filled by a team defined by UEFA.

For the UEFA Champions League Path, the 32 teams were drawn into eight groups of four. There was no separate draw held, with the group compositions identical to the draw for the 2018–19 UEFA Champions League group stage, which was held on 30 August 2018, 18:00 CEST, at the Grimaldi Forum in Monaco.

Key to colours
Group winners advanced to the round of 16
Group runners-up advanced to the play-offs

Pot 1 Team (Spain) Real Madrid (Spain) Atlético Madrid (Spain) Barcelona (Germany) Bayern Munich (England) Manchester City (Italy) Juventus (France) Paris Saint-Germain (Russia) Lokomotiv Moscow	Pot 2 Team (Germany) Borussia Dortmund (Portugal) Porto (England) Manchester United (Ukraine) Shakhtar Donetsk (Portugal) Benfica (Italy) Napoli (England) Tottenham Hotspur (Italy) Roma	Pot 3 Team (England) Liverpool (Germany) Schalke 04 (France) Lyon (France) Monaco (Netherlands) Ajax (Russia) CSKA Moscow (Netherlands) PSV Eindhoven (Spain) Valencia	Pot 4 Team (Czech Republic) Viktoria Plzeň (Belgium) Club Brugge (Turkey) Galatasaray (Switzerland) Young Boys (Italy) Inter Milan (Germany) TSG Hoffenheim (Serbia) Red Star Belgrade (Greece) AEK Athens

== Format ==
In each group, teams played against each other home-and-away in a round-robin format. The eight group winners advanced to the round of 16, while the eight runners-up advanced to the play-offs, where they were joined by the eight second round winners from the Domestic Champions Path.

=== Tiebreakers ===
Teams were ranked according to points (3 points for a win, 1 point for a draw, 0 points for a loss), and if tied on points, the following tiebreaking criteria were applied, in the order given, to determine the rankings (Regulations Articles 14.03):

1. Points in head-to-head matches among tied teams;
2. Goal difference in head-to-head matches among tied teams;
3. Goals scored in head-to-head matches among tied teams;
4. Away goals scored in head-to-head matches among tied teams;
5. If more than two teams were tied, and after applying all head-to-head criteria above, a subset of teams were still tied, all head-to-head criteria above were reapplied exclusively to this subset of teams;
6. Goal difference in all group matches;
7. Goals scored in all group matches;
8. Away goals scored in all group matches;
9. Wins in all group matches;
10. Away wins in all group matches;
11. Disciplinary points (red card = 3 points, yellow card = 1 point, expulsion for two yellow cards in one match = 3 points);
12. Drawing of lots.

== Groups ==
The matchdays were 18–19 September, 2–3 October, 23–24 October, 6–7 November, 27–28 November, and 11–12 December 2018.

Times are CET/CEST, (Note: CEST (UTC+2) for dates up to 27 October 2018 (matchdays 1–3), and CET (UTC+1) for dates thereafter (matchdays 4–6).) as listed by UEFA (local times, if different, are in parentheses).

=== Group A ===
Pos	Team	Pld	W	D	L	GF	GA	GD	Pts	Qualification	ATM	MON	BRU	DOR
1	(Spain) Atlético Madrid	6	4	0	2	15	8	+7	12	Round of 16	—	3–0	1–2	4–0
2	(France) Monaco	6	3	1	2	9	9	0	10	Play-offs	0–2	—	3–1	1–1
3	(Belgium) Club Brugge	6	2	1	3	10	11	−1	7		3–1	2–3	—	1–1
4	(Germany) Borussia Dortmund	6	1	2	3	7	13	−6	5		3–4	0–2	2–1	—

Source: UEFA
Rules for classification: Group stage tiebreakers
18 September 2018
14:00

Monaco (France)	0–2	(Spain) Atlético Madrid
	Report	Camello 48'; Mollejo 62' (pen.)

Stade Pierre de Coubertin, Cannes
Referee: Stephan Klossner (Switzerland)
18 September 2018
16:00

Club Brugge (Belgium)	1–1	(Germany) Borussia Dortmund
Ngonge 62'	Report	Aydinel 26'

Burgemeester Van de Wielestadion, Deinze
Referee: Nikola Dabanović (Montenegro)

3 October 2018
14:00

Atlético Madrid (Spain)	1–2	(Belgium) Club Brugge
Camello 32'	Report	Ngonge 29', 80'

Cerro del Espino, Majadahonda
Referee: Rob Harvey (Republic of Ireland)
3 October 2018
16:00

Borussia Dortmund (Germany)	0–2	(France) Monaco
	Report	Millot 17'; Gouano 34'

Dortmund Brackel Training Ground, Dortmund
Referee: Jens Maae (Denmark)

24 October 2018
14:00

Borussia Dortmund (Germany)	3–4	(Spain) Atlético Madrid
Pherai 32'; Kehr 80', 82'	Report	Schell 3' (o.g.); Puñal 34'; Del Campo 71', 75'

Dortmund Brackel Training Ground, Dortmund
Referee: Manuel Schuettengruber (Austria)
24 October 2018
14:00

Club Brugge (Belgium)	2–3	(France) Monaco
Fadiga 33'; De Ketelaere 77'	Report	Mfomo 13'; Gouano 66', 90+4'

Burgemeester Van de Wielestadion, Deinze
Referee: Fran Jović (Croatia)

6 November 2018
14:00

Monaco (France)	3–1	(Belgium) Club Brugge
Fuakala 27' (o.g.); Zerkane 34'; Isidor 41'	Report	Ngonge 77'

Stade André Vanco, Monaco
Referee: Roi Reinshreiber (Israel)
6 November 2018
16:00

Atlético Madrid (Spain)	4–0	(Germany) Borussia Dortmund
Sanabria 25'; Camello 34'; Riquelme 36'; Mollejo 74'	Report

Cerro del Espino, Majadahonda
Referee: Luis Godinho (Portugal)

28 November 2018
14:00

Atlético Madrid (Spain)	3–0	(France) Monaco
Camello 21', 67'; Mollejo 76'	Report

Cerro del Espino, Majadahonda
Referee: Stuart Attwell (England)
28 November 2018
15:00

Borussia Dortmund (Germany)	2–1	(Belgium) Club Brugge
Peña Zauner 21'; Pherai 80'	Report	De Ketelaere 54'

Dortmund Brackel Training Ground, Dortmund
Referee: Boris Marhefka (Slovakia)

11 December 2018
14:00

Monaco (France)	1–1	(Germany) Borussia Dortmund
Jiddou 24'	Report	Hetemi 79'

Stade Prince Héréditaire Jacques, Monaco
Referee: Barbeno Luca (San Marino)
11 December 2018
16:00

Club Brugge (Belgium)	3–1	(Spain) Atlético Madrid
De Wolf 63', 90+1' (pen.); Schoonbaert 79'	Report	Del Campo 45'

Burgemeester Van de Wielestadion, Deinze
Referee: Irfan Peljto (Bosnia and Herzegovina)

=== Group B ===
Pos	Team	Pld	W	D	L	GF	GA	GD	Pts	Qualification	BAR	TOT	INT	PSV
1	(Spain) Barcelona	6	3	2	1	8	6	+2	11	Round of 16	—	0–2	2–1	2–1
2	(England) Tottenham Hotspur	6	2	3	1	10	8	+2	9	Play-offs	1–1	—	2–4	2–0
3	(Italy) Inter Milan	6	2	1	3	10	9	+1	7		0–2	1–1	—	3–0
4	(Netherlands) PSV Eindhoven	6	1	2	3	6	11	−5	5		1–1	2–2	2–1	—

Source: UEFA
Rules for classification: Group stage tiebreakers
18 September 2018
14:00

Barcelona (Spain)	2–1	(Netherlands) PSV Eindhoven
De Vega 10'; González 88'	Report	De la Fuente 77' (o.g.)

Mini Estadi, Barcelona
Attendance: 637
Referee: Jérôme Brisard (France)
18 September 2018
14:00

Inter Milan (Italy)	1–1	(England) Tottenham Hotspur
Colidio 22'	Report	Roles 58' (pen.)

Stadio Breda, Sesto San Giovanni
Referee: Antti Munukka (Finland)

3 October 2018
14:00

PSV Eindhoven (Netherlands)	2–1	(Italy) Inter Milan
Piroe 86'; Vertessen 90+3'	Report	Colidio 24'

De Herdgang, Eindhoven
Referee: Bart Vertenten (Belgium)
3 October 2018
16:00 (15:00 UTC+1)

Tottenham Hotspur (England)	1–1	(Spain) Barcelona
Richards 45'	Report	Rojas 24'

Tottenham Hotspur Training Centre, London
Attendance: 258
Referee: Vilhjalmur Thorarinsson (Iceland)

24 October 2018
14:00

PSV Eindhoven (Netherlands)	2–2	(England) Tottenham Hotspur
Piroe 16'; Ihattaren 42'	Report	Maghoma 74'; Brown 90+4'

De Herdgang, Eindhoven
Referee: Glenn Nyberg (Sweden)
24 October 2018
16:00

Barcelona (Spain)	2–1	(Italy) Inter Milan
De la Fuente 4'; Mortimer 33'	Report	Colidio 48' (pen.)

Mini Estadi, Barcelona
Attendance: 680
Referee: Dimitrios Massias (Cyprus)

6 November 2018
13:00 (12:00 UTC+0)

Tottenham Hotspur (England)	2–0	(Netherlands) PSV Eindhoven
Fagan-Walcott 5'; Parrott 90+2'	Report

Tottenham Hotspur Training Centre, London
Attendance: 253
Referee: Ian McNabb (Northern Ireland)
6 November 2018
14:00

Inter Milan (Italy)	0–2	(Spain) Barcelona
	Report	Peque 42'; González 90+2'

Stadio Breda, Sesto San Giovanni
Referee: Bartosz Frankowski (Poland)

28 November 2018
14:00 (13:00 UTC+0)

Tottenham Hotspur (England)	2–4	(Italy) Inter Milan
Parrott 24'; Roles 25'	Report	Persyn 12'; Rorič 63'; Merola 82'; Colidio 87'

Tottenham Hotspur Training Centre, London
Attendance: 243
Referee: Alex Troleis (Faroe Islands)
28 November 2018
14:00

PSV Eindhoven (Netherlands)	1–1	(Spain) Barcelona
Vertessen 74'	Report	Fati 8'

De Herdgang, Eindhoven
Referee: Donald Robertson (Scotland)

11 December 2018
14:00

Inter Milan (Italy)	3–0	(Netherlands) PSV Eindhoven
Adorante 64'; Rorič 78'; Colidio 81'	Report

Stadio Breda, Sesto San Giovanni
Referee: Rade Obrenovic (Slovenia)
11 December 2018
16:00

Barcelona (Spain)	0–2	(England) Tottenham Hotspur
	Report	Parrott 17'; Richards 89'

Mini Estadi, Barcelona
Attendance: 807
Referee: Antti Munukka (Finland)

=== Group C ===
Pos	Team	Pld	W	D	L	GF	GA	GD	Pts	Qualification	LIV	PAR	NAP	RSB
1	(England) Liverpool	6	4	1	1	17	7	+10	13	Round of 16	—	5–2	5–0	2–1
2	(France) Paris Saint-Germain	6	4	1	1	13	10	+3	13	Play-offs	3–2	—	0–0	2–1
3	(Italy) Napoli	6	1	3	2	9	15	−6	6		1–1	2–5	—	5–3
4	(Serbia) Red Star Belgrade	6	0	1	5	6	13	−7	1		0–2	0–1	1–1	—

Source: UEFA
Rules for classification: Group stage tiebreakers
18 September 2018
16:00 (15:00 UTC+1)

Liverpool (England)	5–2	(France) Paris Saint-Germain
Williams 8'; Camacho 13', 81'; Adekanye 36'; Jones 78'	Report	Williams 75'; Kalimuendo 89' (pen.)

Totally Wicked Stadium, St Helens
Attendance: 476
Referee: Alexander Harkam (Austria)
18 September 2018
16:00

Red Star Belgrade (Serbia)	1–1	(Italy) Napoli
Joveljić 17'	Report	Senese 13'

Čukarički Stadium, Belgrade
Referee: Adrien Jaccottet (Switzerland)

3 October 2018
14:00

Napoli (Italy)	1–1	(England) Liverpool
Gaetano 90+4'	Report	Adekanye 28'

Stadio Pasquale Janniello, Frattamaggiore
Attendance: 767
Referee: Marius Avram (Romania)
3 October 2018
14:00

Paris Saint-Germain (France)	2–1	(Serbia) Red Star Belgrade
Kapo 8'; Fressange 80'	Report	Joveljić 45+1'

Stade Municipal Georges Lefèvre, Saint-Germain-en-Laye
Attendance: 384
Referee: Alan Mario Sant (Malta)

24 October 2018
16:00

Paris Saint-Germain (France)	0–0	(Italy) Napoli
	Report

Stade Municipal Georges Lefèvre, Saint-Germain-en-Laye
Attendance: 809
Referee: Kirill Levnikov (Russia)
24 October 2018
16:00 (15:00 UTC+1)

Liverpool (England)	2–1	(Serbia) Red Star Belgrade
Camacho 86'; Williams 90+2'	Report	Joveljić 76'

Totally Wicked Stadium, St Helens
Attendance: 675
Referee: Iwan Arwel Griffith (Wales)

6 November 2018
12:00

Napoli (Italy)	2–5	(France) Paris Saint-Germain
Gaetano 62'; Zedadka 66'	Report	Muinga 13'; Kapo 43'; Aouchiche 51'; Yaisien 70'; Coulibaly 89'

Stadio Pasquale Janniello, Frattamaggiore
Referee: Anastasios Papapetrou (Greece)
6 November 2018
14:00

Red Star Belgrade (Serbia)	0–2	(England) Liverpool
	Report	Jones 69'; Lewis 75'

Čukarički Stadium, Belgrade
Attendance: 2,768
Referee: Christopher Jaeger (Austria)

28 November 2018
14:00

Napoli (Italy)	5–3	(Serbia) Red Star Belgrade
Perini 14'; Saporetti 48'; Gaetano 70', 82', 90+1'	Report	Jočić 3' (pen.); Burmaz 26'; Dedijer 64'

Stadio Pasquale Janniello, Frattamaggiore
Referee: Sándor Andó-Szabó (Hungary)
28 November 2018
16:00

Paris Saint-Germain (France)	3–2	(England) Liverpool
Providence 16'; Muinga 49', 81' (pen.)	Report	Millar 13', 86'

Stade Municipal Georges Lefèvre, Saint-Germain-en-Laye
Attendance: 945
Referee: Christian Dingert (Germany)

11 December 2018
14:00 (13:00 UTC+0)

Liverpool (England)	5–0	(Italy) Napoli
Camacho 35'; Millar 43'; Glatzel 48'; Jones 50'; Duncan 86'	Report

Totally Wicked Stadium, St Helens
Attendance: 298
Referee: Mario Zebec (Croatia)
11 December 2018
16:00

Red Star Belgrade (Serbia)	0–1	(France) Paris Saint-Germain
	Report	Muinga 83'

Čukarički Stadium, Belgrade
Referee: Nejc Kajtazovic (Slovenia)

=== Group D ===
Pos	Team	Pld	W	D	L	GF	GA	GD	Pts	Qualification	POR	LMO	GAL	SCH
1	(Portugal) Porto	6	4	1	1	13	5	+8	13	Round of 16	—	2–1	2–2	3–0
2	(Russia) Lokomotiv Moscow	6	3	1	2	8	5	+3	10	Play-offs	2–1	—	0–1	0–0
3	(Turkey) Galatasaray	6	3	1	2	8	6	+2	10		0–2	0–1	—	3–0
4	(Germany) Schalke 04	6	0	1	5	2	15	−13	1		0–3	1–4	1–2	—

Source: UEFA
Rules for classification: Group stage tiebreakers
18 September 2018
16:00 (17:00 UTC+3)

Galatasaray (Turkey)	0–1	(Russia) Lokomotiv Moscow
	Report	Suleimanov 67'

Necmi Kadıoğlu Stadium, Istanbul
Referee: Enea Jorgji (Albania)
18 September 2018
16:00

Schalke 04 (Germany)	0–3	(Portugal) Porto
	Report	Silva 32'; Baró 57'; Torres 74'

Lohrheidestadion, Bochum
Referee: Kristo Tohver (Estonia)

3 October 2018
14:00 (15:00 UTC+3)

Lokomotiv Moscow (Russia)	0–0	(Germany) Schalke 04
	Report

Sapsan Arena, Moscow
Referee: Donatas Rumšas (Lithuania)
3 October 2018
15:00 (14:00 UTC+1)

Porto (Portugal)	2–2	(Turkey) Galatasaray
Mário 63'; Silva 80'	Report	Gül 71'; Babacan 90+5'

CTFD PortoGaia, Vila Nova de Gaia
Attendance: 185
Referee: Ricardo de Burgos Bengoetxea (Spain)

24 October 2018
15:00 (16:00 UTC+3)

Lokomotiv Moscow (Russia)	2–1	(Portugal) Porto
Kul 13'; Mironov 61'	Report	Silva 34'

Sapsan Arena, Moscow
Referee: Jérôme Brisard (France)
24 October 2018
16:00 (17:00 UTC+3)

Galatasaray (Turkey)	3–0	(Germany) Schalke 04
Babacan 45', 69'; Doğan 83'	Report

Necmi Kadıoğlu Stadium, Istanbul
Referee: Fyodor Zammit (Malta)

6 November 2018
15:00 (14:00 UTC+0)

Porto (Portugal)	2–1	(Russia) Lokomotiv Moscow
Faustino 49'; Mário 61'	Report	Lapshov 90'

CTFD PortoGaia, Vila Nova de Gaia
Attendance: 309
Referee: Rob Hennessy (Republic of Ireland)
6 November 2018
18:00

Schalke 04 (Germany)	1–2	(Turkey) Galatasaray
Biskup 42'	Report	Kol 19'; Kapı 76'

Lohrheidestadion, Bochum
Referee: Ádám Farkas (Hungary)

28 November 2018
13:00 (15:00 UTC+3)

Lokomotiv Moscow (Russia)	0–1	(Turkey) Galatasaray
	Report	Kaya 90+4'

Sapsan Arena, Moscow
Referee: Danilo Grujić (Serbia)
28 November 2018
15:00 (14:00 UTC+0)

Porto (Portugal)	3–0	(Germany) Schalke 04
Baró 18', 37'; Sousa 48'	Report

CTFD PortoGaia, Vila Nova de Gaia
Attendance: 410
Referee: Eldorjan Hamiti (Albania)

11 December 2018
12:00 (14:00 UTC+3)

Galatasaray (Turkey)	0–2	(Portugal) Porto
	Report	Silva 13' (pen.); Baró 69'

Necmi Kadıoğlu Stadium, Istanbul
Referee: Stephan Klossner (Switzerland)
11 December 2018
14:00

Schalke 04 (Germany)	1–4	(Russia) Lokomotiv Moscow
Mercan 86'	Report	Mironov 27' (pen.); Poyarkov 32'; Karapuzov 39'; Suleimanov 57'

Lohrheidestadion, Bochum
Referee: Timotheos Christofi (Cyprus)

=== Group E ===
Pos	Team	Pld	W	D	L	GF	GA	GD	Pts	Qualification	AJX	BEN	BAY	AEK
1	(Netherlands) Ajax	6	3	2	1	23	8	+15	11	Round of 16	—	3–0	1–2	6–0
2	(Portugal) Benfica	6	3	2	1	14	9	+5	11	Play-offs	3–3	—	3–0	3–0
3	(Germany) Bayern Munich	6	3	2	1	12	8	+4	11		2–2	2–2	—	2–0
4	(Greece) AEK Athens	6	0	0	6	2	26	−24	0		1–8	1–3	0–4	—

Source: UEFA
Rules for classification: Group stage tiebreakers
19 September 2018
14:00

Ajax (Netherlands)	6–0	(Greece) AEK Athens
Kühn 6'; Nunnely 26'; Jensen 34'; Hansen 66'; Dest 67'; Ünüvar 84' (pen.)	Report

Sportpark De Toekomst, Ouder-Amstel
Referee: Mohammed Al-Hakim (Sweden)
19 September 2018
14:00 (13:00 UTC+1)

Benfica (Portugal)	3–0	(Germany) Bayern Munich
Filipe 14', 83'; Ramos 18'	Report

Caixa Futebol Campus, Seixal
Attendance: 702
Referee: Stuart Attwell (England)

2 October 2018
14:00

Bayern Munich (Germany)	2–2	(Netherlands) Ajax
Mai 59'; Shabani 70'	Report	Lang 2'; Botman 90'

FC Bayern Campus, Munich
Attendance: 521
Referee: Vitali Meshkov (Russia)
2 October 2018
16:00 (17:00 UTC+3)

AEK Athens (Greece)	1–3	(Portugal) Benfica
Botos 27'	Report	Santos 8', 31'; Embaló 38'

Georgios Kamaras Stadium, Athens
Referee: Marco Di Bello (Italy)

23 October 2018
14:00 (15:00 UTC+3)

AEK Athens (Greece)	0–4	(Germany) Bayern Munich
	Report	Zirkzee 42'; Zylla 54'; Shabani 56'; Timossi Andersson 81'

Georgios Kamaras Stadium, Athens
Referee: Duje Strukan (Croatia)
23 October 2018
14:00

Ajax (Netherlands)	3–0	(Portugal) Benfica
Gravenberch 44'; Jensen 60'; Kühn 86'	Report

Sportpark De Toekomst, Ouder-Amstel
Referee: Jonathan Lardot (Belgium)

7 November 2018
14:00

Bayern Munich (Germany)	2–0	(Greece) AEK Athens
Zylla 48'; Zirkzee 82'	Report

FC Bayern Campus, Munich
Attendance: 241
Referee: Bojan Pandžić (Sweden)
7 November 2018
16:00 (15:00 UTC+0)

Benfica (Portugal)	3–3	(Netherlands) Ajax
Santos 13' (pen.); Dantas 73' (pen.); Ramos 82'	Report	Brobbey 45'; Ekkelenkamp 48'; Kühn 58'

Caixa Futebol Campus, Seixal
Attendance: 713
Referee: Ricardo de Burgos Bengoetxea (Spain)

27 November 2018
14:00 (15:00 UTC+2)

AEK Athens (Greece)	1–8	(Netherlands) Ajax
Bogdani 90+2'	Report	Nunnely 8', 27'; Kühn 24', 45+2', 76'; Jensen 48'; Llansana 67'; Taylor 85'

Georgios Kamaras Stadium, Athens
Referee: Trustin Farrugia Cann (Malta)
27 November 2018
16:00

Bayern Munich (Germany)	2–2	(Portugal) Benfica
Zirkzee 66'; Zylla 80'	Report	Santos 43'; Camará 90'

FC Bayern Campus, Munich
Attendance: 441
Referee: Karim Abed (France)

12 December 2018
16:00

Ajax (Netherlands)	1–2	(Germany) Bayern Munich
Brobbey 79'	Report	Shabani 24'; Zirkzee 66'

Sportpark De Toekomst, Ouder-Amstel
Referee: Alexander Harkam (Austria)
12 December 2018
16:00 (15:00 UTC+0)

Benfica (Portugal)	3–0	(Greece) AEK Athens
Santos 15'; Tavares 80'; Dantas 90+3' (pen.)	Report

Caixa Futebol Campus, Seixal
Attendance: 527
Referee: Espen Eskås (Norway)

=== Group F ===
Pos	Team	Pld	W	D	L	GF	GA	GD	Pts	Qualification	HOF	LYO	MCI	SHK
1	(Germany) TSG Hoffenheim	6	3	2	1	15	10	+5	11	Round of 16	—	3–1	5–2	1–1
2	(France) Lyon	6	3	2	1	13	8	+5	11	Play-offs	3–3	—	2–0	2–0
3	(England) Manchester City	6	2	1	3	10	14	−4	7		2–1	1–4	—	4–1
4	(Ukraine) Shakhtar Donetsk	6	0	3	3	5	11	−6	3		1–2	1–1	1–1	—

Source: UEFA
Rules for classification: Group stage tiebreakers
19 September 2018
12:00 (13:00 UTC+3)

Shakhtar Donetsk (Ukraine)	1–2	(Germany) TSG Hoffenheim
Kulakov 74'	Report	Alberico 45+1' (pen.); Tubluk 61'

FC Metalist Training Ground, Vysokyi
Attendance: 250
Referee: Irfan Peljto (Bosnia and Herzegovina)
19 September 2018
14:00 (13:00 UTC+1)

Manchester City (England)	1–4	(France) Lyon
Nmecha 57'	Report	Devarrewaere 18'; Pintor 20'; Cherki 86'; Augarreau 87'

Academy Stadium, Manchester
Attendance: 326
Referee: Petr Ardeleánu (Czech Republic)

2 October 2018
14:00

TSG Hoffenheim (Germany)	5–2	(England) Manchester City
Tubluk 4'; Otto 7'; Landwehr 73', 90+5'; Elmkies 90+2'	Report	Poveda 24'; Matondo 63'

Dietmar-Hopp-Stadion, Sinsheim
Attendance: 2,830
Referee: Juri Frischer (Estonia)
2 October 2018
15:00

Lyon (France)	2–0	(Ukraine) Shakhtar Donetsk
Soumaré 15'; Pintor 68'	Report

Groupama OL Training Center, Décines-Charpieu
Attendance: 421
Referee: Nikola Popov (Bulgaria)

23 October 2018
11:00 (12:00 UTC+3)

Shakhtar Donetsk (Ukraine)	1–1	(England) Manchester City
Kulakov 73'	Report	Harwood-Bellis 90+5'

FC Metalist Training Ground, Vysokyi
Attendance: 420
Referee: Horatiu Fesnic (Romania)
23 October 2018
15:00

TSG Hoffenheim (Germany)	3–1	(France) Lyon
Alberico 67' (pen.); Stojilković 79', 90+3'	Report	Caqueret 55'

Dietmar-Hopp-Stadion, Sinsheim
Attendance: 1,900
Referee: Alain Bieri (Switzerland)

7 November 2018
14:00

Lyon (France)	3–3	(Germany) TSG Hoffenheim
Rafia 35'; Ndicka 69'; Pintor 82' (pen.)	Report	Alberico 45' (pen.); Otto 62'; Geschwill 90'

Groupama OL Training Center, Décines-Charpieu
Attendance: 832
Referee: Milovan Milacic (Montenegro)
7 November 2018
16:00 (15:00 UTC+0)

Manchester City (England)	4–1	(Ukraine) Shakhtar Donetsk
Richards 54', 63' (pen.); Garré 66'; Gonzalez 67'	Report	Chekh 18'

Academy Stadium, Manchester
Attendance: 395
Referee: Adrien Jaccottet (Switzerland)

27 November 2018
15:00

TSG Hoffenheim (Germany)	1–1	(Ukraine) Shakhtar Donetsk
Onana 55'	Report	Bondarenko 31'

Dietmar-Hopp-Stadion, Sinsheim
Attendance: 1,120
Referee: Christophe Pires (Luxembourg)
27 November 2018
15:00

Lyon (France)	2–0	(England) Manchester City
Rafia 4'; Solet 62'	Report

Groupama OL Training Center, Décines-Charpieu
Attendance: 736
Referee: Mete Kalkavan (Turkey)

12 December 2018
11:00 (12:00 UTC+2)

Shakhtar Donetsk (Ukraine)	1–1	(France) Lyon
Kashchuk 59'	Report	Griffiths 90+4'

Bannikov Stadium, Kyiv (Note: With the ongoing Russian aggression and the recent November Kerch Strait incident, the game was moved from the Kharkiv suburbs to Kyiv as a martial law was initiated in half of the country near the border with Russia.)
Attendance: 285
Referee: Tomasz Musiał (Poland)
12 December 2018
16:00 (15:00 UTC+0)

Manchester City (England)	2–1	(Germany) TSG Hoffenheim
Garré 11'; Poveda 35'	Report	Stojilković 75'

Academy Stadium, Manchester
Attendance: 631
Referee: Tore Hansen (Norway)

=== Group G ===
Pos	Team	Pld	W	D	L	GF	GA	GD	Pts	Qualification	RMA	ROM	PLZ	CSKA
1	(Spain) Real Madrid	6	6	0	0	20	7	+13	18	Round of 16	—	3–1	3–2	2–1
2	(Italy) Roma	6	3	0	3	14	17	−3	9	Play-offs	1–6	—	3–4	3–1
3	(Czech Republic) Viktoria Plzeň	6	1	2	3	11	14	−3	5		1–2	2–4	—	1–1
4	(Russia) CSKA Moscow	6	0	2	4	6	13	−7	2		1–4	1–2	1–1	—

Source: UEFA
Rules for classification: Group stage tiebreakers
19 September 2018
13:00

Viktoria Plzeň (Czech Republic)	1–1	(Russia) CSKA Moscow
Kepl 66' (pen.)	Report	Yanov 42'

Stadion TJ Přeštice, Přeštice
Referee: Peter Kralović (Slovakia)
19 September 2018
16:00

Real Madrid (Spain)	3–1	(Italy) Roma
Pedro 14'; Rodrigo 30'; García 53'	Report	Cangiano 71'

Alfredo di Stéfano, Madrid
Attendance: 403
Referee: Fabio Verissimo (Portugal)

2 October 2018
13:00 (14:00 UTC+3)

CSKA Moscow (Russia)	1–4	(Spain) Real Madrid
Zhironkin 30'	Report	Alberto 3', 21', 45'; Rodrigo 58'

Oktyabr Stadium, Moscow
Referee: Ali Palabıyık (Turkey)
2 October 2018
14:30

Roma (Italy)	3–4	(Czech Republic) Viktoria Plzeň
Simonetti 13'; Bouah 48'; D'Orazio 50'	Report	Míka 21'; Kepl 62', 90'; Pihrt 72'

Stadio Tre Fontane, Rome
Referee: Ádám Farkas (Hungary)

23 October 2018
14:00

Roma (Italy)	3–1	(Russia) CSKA Moscow
Riccardi 13'; Bouah 24'; D'Orazio 63'	Report	Eleev 62'

Stadio Tre Fontane, Rome
Referee: Ivaylo Stoyanov (Bulgaria)
23 October 2018
16:00

Real Madrid (Spain)	3–2	(Czech Republic) Viktoria Plzeň
Baeza 5'; Olawale 57'; Rodrigo 62'	Report	Gabriel 54'; Krátký 58'

Alfredo di Stéfano, Madrid
Attendance: 550
Referee: Luis Teixeira (Portugal)

7 November 2018
12:00 (14:00 UTC+3)

CSKA Moscow (Russia)	1–2	(Italy) Roma
Eleev 47'	Report	Riccardi 17'; Bouah 45'

Oktyabr Stadium Artificial Turf, Moscow
Referee: Aleksandrs Golubevs (Latvia)
7 November 2018
13:00

Viktoria Plzeň (Czech Republic)	1–2	(Spain) Real Madrid
Arzberger 34'	Report	Baeza 69'; Rodrigo 90+5'

Stadion TJ Přeštice, Přeštice
Referee: Lawrence Visser (Belgium)

27 November 2018
12:00 (14:00 UTC+3)

CSKA Moscow (Russia)	1–1	(Czech Republic) Viktoria Plzeň
Eleev 54'	Report	Pihrt 3'

Oktyabr Stadium Artificial Turf, Moscow
Referee: Alexandr Aliyev (Kazakhstan)
27 November 2018
14:00

Roma (Italy)	1–6	(Spain) Real Madrid
Riccardi 59'	Report	Gila 5'; Rodrigo 9', 70'; Gutiérrez 24'; Pedro 90+1', 90+4'

Stadio Tre Fontane, Rome
Referee: Fedayi San (Switzerland)

12 December 2018
12:00

Viktoria Plzeň (Czech Republic)	2–4	(Italy) Roma
Krátký 34' (pen.); Míka 40'	Report	Míka 29' (o.g.); Gabriel 41' (o.g.); Riccardi 48', 90+2'

FC Viktoria Plzeň Training Centre, Plzeň
Referee: Filip Glova (Slovakia)
12 December 2018
15:00

Real Madrid (Spain)	2–1	(Russia) CSKA Moscow
Álvaro 45'; Iván 80'	Report	Popov 90+2'

Alfredo di Stéfano, Madrid
Attendance: 270
Referee: Manfredas Lukjancukas (Lithuania)

=== Group H ===
Pos	Team	Pld	W	D	L	GF	GA	GD	Pts	Qualification	MUN	JUV	YB	VAL
1	(England) Manchester United	6	5	1	0	20	7	+13	16	Round of 16	—	4–1	6–2	4–0
2	(Italy) Juventus	6	3	1	2	11	11	0	10	Play-offs	2–2	—	2–1	3–0
3	(Switzerland) Young Boys	6	2	1	3	12	15	−3	7		1–2	4–2	—	3–3
4	(Spain) Valencia	6	0	1	5	4	14	−10	1		1–2	0–1	0–1	—

Source: UEFA
Rules for classification: Group stage tiebreakers
19 September 2018
14:00

Valencia (Spain)	0–1	(Italy) Juventus
	Report	Petrelli 70'

Antonio Puchades, Paterna
Referee: Radu Petrescu (Romania)
19 September 2018
16:00

Young Boys (Switzerland)	1–2	(England) Manchester United
Kronig 15' (pen.)	Report	Greenwood 21'; Gomes 90+3' (pen.)

Sportpark Wyler, Bern
Referee: Fran Jović (Croatia)

2 October 2018
14:00

Juventus (Italy)	2–1	(Switzerland) Young Boys
Serrão 9'; Moreno 67'	Report	Anzolin 87' (o.g.)

Juventus Center, Vinovo
Attendance: 262
Referee: Karim Abed (France)
2 October 2018
16:00 (15:00 UTC+1)

Manchester United (England)	4–0	(Spain) Valencia
Bohui 30'; Greenwood 50'; Chong 61'; Baars 83'	Report

Leigh Sports Village, Leigh
Attendance: 510
Referee: Ville Nevalainen (Finland)

23 October 2018
14:00

Young Boys (Switzerland)	3–3	(Spain) Valencia
Vladi 10'; Maier 26'; Kronig 66' (pen.)	Report	Pascu 16'; Lee 59'; Contell 81'

Sportpark Wyler, Bern
Referee: Mads-Kristoffer Kristoffersen (Denmark)
23 October 2018
16:00 (15:00 UTC+1)

Manchester United (England)	4–1	(Italy) Juventus
Bohui 8'; Greenwood 33'; Garner 45'; Levitt 77'	Report	Caviglia 43'

Leigh Sports Village, Leigh
Attendance: 1,352
Referee: Christian Dingert (Germany)

7 November 2018
14:00

Valencia (Spain)	0–1	(Switzerland) Young Boys
	Report	De Donno 83'

Antonio Puchades, Paterna
Referee: Alexandre Boucaut (Belgium)
7 November 2018
16:00

Juventus (Italy)	2–2	(England) Manchester United
Petrelli 21' (pen.); Portanova 62'	Report	Serrão 60' (o.g.); Barlow 67' (pen.)

Juventus Center, Vinovo
Attendance: 500
Referee: Halil Umut Meler (Turkey)

27 November 2018
14:00 (13:00 UTC+0)

Manchester United (England)	6–2	(Switzerland) Young Boys
Greenwood 25', 30'; Barlow 79' (pen.); Chong 81' (pen.); Levitt 87'; Bughail-Mellor 90'	Report	Mambimbi 7'; Kronig 32' (pen.)

Leigh Sports Village, Leigh
Attendance: 693
Referee: Rob Harvey (Republic of Ireland)
27 November 2018
16:00

Juventus (Italy)	3–0	(Spain) Valencia
Caviglia 21', 90+3'; Portanova 41'	Report

Juventus Center, Vinovo
Attendance: 255
Referee: Tihomir Pejin (Croatia)

12 December 2018
13:00

Valencia (Spain)	1–2	(England) Manchester United
Escobar 13'	Report	Burkart 37'; Barlow 42'

Antonio Puchades, Paterna
Referee: Laurent Kopriwa (Luxembourg)
12 December 2018
14:00

Young Boys (Switzerland)	4–2	(Italy) Juventus
Tokam 11'; Ballet 15', 78'; Kronig 55'	Report	Frederiksen 9'; Boloca 90+2'

Sportpark Wyler, Bern
Referee: Admir Šehović (Bosnia and Herzegovina)
