= 2018–19 UEFA Youth League knockout phase =

European club football tournament

The 2018–19 UEFA Youth League knockout phase began on 19 February and concluded on 29 April 2019 with the final at Colovray Stadium in Nyon, Switzerland. It decided the champions of the 2018–19 UEFA Youth League. A total of 24 teams competed in the knockout phase (knockout round play-offs and round of 16 onwards).

Times are CET/CEST, (Note: CET (UTC+1) for dates up to 30 March 2019 (knockout round play-offs and round of 16), and CEST (UTC+2) for dates thereafter (quarter-finals, semi-finals and final).) as listed by UEFA (local times, if different, are in parentheses).

== Qualified teams ==
=== UEFA Champions League Path ===
Group	Winners (enter round of 16)	Runners-up (enter play-offs as away team)
A	(Spain) Atlético Madrid	(France) Monaco
B	(Spain) Barcelona	(England) Tottenham Hotspur
C	(England) Liverpool	(France) Paris Saint-Germain
D	(Portugal) Porto	(Russia) Lokomotiv Moscow
E	(Netherlands) Ajax	(Portugal) Benfica
F	(Germany) TSG Hoffenheim	(France) Lyon
G	(Spain) Real Madrid	(Italy) Roma
H	(England) Manchester United	(Italy) Juventus

=== Domestic Champions Path ===
Second round winners
(enter play-offs as home team)
(Ukraine) Dynamo Kyiv
(Denmark) Midtjylland
(France) Montpellier
(England) Chelsea
(Greece) PAOK
(Germany) Hertha BSC
(Croatia) Dinamo Zagreb
(Czech Republic) Sigma Olomouc

== Format ==
The knockout phase (knockout round play-offs and round of 16 onwards), played as a single-elimination tournament, involved 24 teams: 16 teams which qualified from the UEFA Champions League Path (eight group winners and eight group runners-up), and eight teams which qualified from the Domestic Champions Path (eight second round winners):

- The eight group winners from the UEFA Champions League Path entered the round of 16.
- The eight group runners-up from the UEFA Champions League Path and the eight second round winners from the Domestic Champions Path entered the knockout round play-offs. The eight play-off winners advanced to the round of 16.

Each tie was played over a single match. If the score was tied after full time, the match was decided by a penalty shoot-out (no extra time was played).

On 17 July 2014, the UEFA emergency panel ruled that Ukrainian and Russian clubs would not be drawn against each other "until further notice" due to the political unrest between the countries.

== Schedule ==
All draws were held at UEFA headquarters in Nyon, Switzerland.

Knockout phase schedule
Round	Draw	Match dates
Knockout round play-offs	17 December 2018	19–20 February 2019
Round of 16	22 February 2019	12–13 March 2019
Quarter-finals	22 February 2019	2–3 April 2019
Semi-finals	22 February 2019	26 April 2019 at Colovray Stadium, Nyon
Final	22 February 2019	29 April 2019 at Colovray Stadium, Nyon

== Bracket ==
The draw for the round of 16 onwards was held on 22 February 2019, 14:00 CET (UTC+1), at the UEFA headquarters in Nyon, Switzerland. The mechanism of the draws for each round was as follows:

- In the draw for the round of 16, there were no seedings, and the 16 teams (eight UEFA Champions League Path group winners and eight play-off winners) were drawn into eight ties. Teams from the same UEFA Champions League Path group could not be drawn against each other, but teams from the same association could be drawn against each other. The draw also decided the home team for each round of 16 match.
- In the draws for the quarter-finals onwards, there were no seedings, and teams from the same UEFA Champions League Path group or the same association could be drawn against each other (the identity of the quarter-final winners and onwards was not known at the time of the draws). The draws also decided the home team for each quarter-final, and which quarter-final and semi-final winners were designated as the "home" team for each semi-final and final (for administrative purposes as they were played at a neutral venue).

Knockout round play-offs
(Ukraine) Dynamo Kyiv	3
(Italy) Juventus	0
(Greece) PAOK	0
(England) Tottenham Hotspur	1
(Denmark) Midtjylland (p)	1 (4)
(Italy) Roma	1 (2)
(Germany) Hertha BSC	2
(France) Paris Saint-Germain	1
(Czech Republic) Sigma Olomouc	0
(France) Lyon	2
(England) Chelsea	3
(France) Monaco	1
(France) Montpellier	2
(Portugal) Benfica	1
(Croatia) Dinamo Zagreb (p)	1 (5)
(Russia) Lokomotiv Moscow	1 (4)

Round of 16
(Germany) TSG Hoffenheim (p)	0 (4)
(Ukraine) Dynamo Kyiv	0 (2)
(Spain) Atlético Madrid	1
(Spain) Real Madrid	2
(Portugal) Porto	2
(England) Tottenham Hotspur	0
(Denmark) Midtjylland	3
(England) Manchester United	1
(Spain) Barcelona	3
(Germany) Hertha BSC	0
(France) Lyon (p)	2 (6)
(Netherlands) Ajax	2 (5)
(England) Chelsea	2
(France) Montpellier	1
(Croatia) Dinamo Zagreb (p)	1 (4)
(England) Liverpool	1 (3)

Quarter-finals
(Germany) TSG Hoffenheim	4
(Spain) Real Madrid	2
(Portugal) Porto	3
(Denmark) Midtjylland	0
(Spain) Barcelona	3
(France) Lyon	2
(England) Chelsea (p)	2 (4)
(Croatia) Dinamo Zagreb	2 (2)

Semi-finals
26 April – Nyon
(Germany) TSG Hoffenheim	0
(Portugal) Porto	3
26 April – Nyon
(Spain) Barcelona	2 (4)
(England) Chelsea (p)	2 (5)

Final
29 April – Nyon
(Portugal) Porto	3
(England) Chelsea	1

== Knockout round play-offs ==
The draw for the knockout round play-offs was held on 17 December 2018, 14:15 CET (UTC+1), at the UEFA headquarters in Nyon, Switzerland. The eight second round winners from the Domestic Champions Path were drawn against the eight group runners-up from the UEFA Champions League Path, with the teams from the Domestic Champions Path hosting the match. Teams from the same association could not be drawn against each other.

=== Summary ===
The matches were played on 19 and 20 February 2019. The eight play-off winners advanced to the round of 16, where they were joined by the eight group winners from the UEFA Champions League Path.

Home team	Score	Away team
PAOK (Greece)	0–1	(England) Tottenham Hotspur
Dinamo Zagreb (Croatia)	1–1 (5–4 p)	(Russia) Lokomotiv Moscow
Dynamo Kyiv (Ukraine)	3–0	(Italy) Juventus
Chelsea (England)	3–1	(France) Monaco
Montpellier (France)	2–1	(Portugal) Benfica
Hertha BSC (Germany)	2–1	(France) Paris Saint-Germain
Midtjylland (Denmark)	1–1 (4–2 p)	(Italy) Roma
Sigma Olomouc (Czech Republic)	0–2	(France) Lyon

=== Matches ===
19 February 2019
18:00 (19:00 UTC+2)

PAOK (Greece)	0–1	(England) Tottenham Hotspur
	Report	Lyons-Foster 13'

Toumba Stadium, Thessaloniki
Attendance: 8,958
Referee: Jérôme Brisard (France)

19 February 2019
14:00

Dinamo Zagreb (Croatia)	1–1	(Russia) Lokomotiv Moscow
Šipoš 13'	Report	Faizullin 90+3'
Penalties
Franjić (penalty scored); Šipoš (penalty scored); Rešetar (penalty scored); Kapitanović (penalty scored); Ćuže (penalty scored)	5–4	(penalty scored) Magkeyev; (penalty scored) Chernyakov; (penalty scored) Faizullin; (penalty missed) Osnov; (penalty scored) Suleimanov

Stadion Hitrec-Kacian, Zagreb
Attendance: 758
Referee: Fabio Verissimo (Portugal)

20 February 2019
13:00 (14:00 UTC+2)

Dynamo Kyiv (Ukraine)	3–0	(Italy) Juventus
Vashchyshyn 6'; Buletsa 69'; Popov 85'	Report

Valeriy Lobanovskyi Dynamo Stadium, Kyiv
Attendance: 10,560
Referee: Jens Maae (Denmark)

19 February 2019
18:00 (17:00 UTC+0)

Chelsea (England)	3–1	(France) Monaco
Brown 41', 56'; Gallagher 77'	Report	Thuram 85'

Cobham Training Centre, Stoke d'Abernon
Attendance: 258
Referee: Vilhjalmur Thorarinsson (Iceland)

20 February 2019
16:00

Montpellier (France)	2–1	(Portugal) Benfica
Vidal 72'; Adouyev 80'	Report	Gouveia 56'

Complexe Bernard-Gasset, Montpellier
Attendance: 1,120
Referee: Alexandre Boucaut (Belgium)

19 February 2019
16:00

Hertha BSC (Germany)	2–1	(France) Paris Saint-Germain
Krebs 74'; Zografakis 85'	Report	Pembele 25'

Olympiapark-Amateurstadion, Berlin
Attendance: 1,831
Referee: Manuel Schuettengruber (Austria)

20 February 2019
14:00

Midtjylland (Denmark)	1–1	(Italy) Roma
Tengstedt 19' (pen.)	Report	Pezzella 3'
Penalties
Tue (penalty scored); Olsen (penalty scored); Madsen (penalty scored); Patrick (penalty scored)	4–2	(penalty scored) Riccardi; (penalty scored) Cargnelutti; (penalty missed) D'Orazio; (penalty missed) Chierico

MCH Arena, Herning
Attendance: 1,835
Referee: Juri Frischer (Estonia)

20 February 2019
16:00

Sigma Olomouc (Czech Republic)	0–2	(France) Lyon
	Report	Caqueret 31'; Pintor 83'

Andrův stadion, Olomouc
Attendance: 4,065
Referee: Enea Jorgji (Albania)

== Round of 16 ==
=== Summary ===
The round of 16 matches were played on 6, 12 and 13 March 2019.

Home team	Score	Away team
Chelsea (England)	2–1	(France) Montpellier
Midtjylland (Denmark)	3–1	(England) Manchester United
Dinamo Zagreb (Croatia)	1–1 (4–3 p)	(England) Liverpool
Lyon (France)	2–2 (6–5 p)	(Netherlands) Ajax
Barcelona (Spain)	3–0	(Germany) Hertha BSC
Porto (Portugal)	2–0	(England) Tottenham Hotspur
TSG Hoffenheim (Germany)	0–0 (4–2 p)	(Ukraine) Dynamo Kyiv
Atlético Madrid (Spain)	1–2	(Spain) Real Madrid

=== Matches ===
13 March 2019
18:00 (17:00 UTC+0)

Chelsea (England)	2–1	(France) Montpellier
Familio-Castillo 72'; McCormick 81'	Report	Adouyev 78'

Cobham Training Centre, Stoke d'Abernon
Attendance: 185
Referee: Kristo Tohver (Estonia)

13 March 2019
14:00

Midtjylland (Denmark)	3–1	(England) Manchester United
Isaksen 11', 72'; Olsen 87'	Report	Gomes 31' (pen.)

MCH Arena, Herning
Attendance: 6,013
Referee: José María Sánchez Martínez (Spain)

12 March 2019
15:00

Dinamo Zagreb (Croatia)	1–1	(England) Liverpool
Šipoš 68'	Report	Duncan 53'
Penalties
Franjić (penalty scored); Šipoš (penalty scored); Marin (penalty missed); Baturina (penalty scored); Ćuže (penalty scored)	4–3	(penalty scored) N. Williams; (penalty missed) Coyle; (penalty scored) Jones; (penalty scored) Glatzel; (penalty missed) Duncan

Stadion Hitrec-Kacian, Zagreb
Attendance: 2,763
Referee: Sergey Ivanov (Russia)

12 March 2019
16:00

Lyon (France)	2–2	(Netherlands) Ajax
Pintor 19'; Rafia 55'	Report	Brobbey 7', 90+1'
Penalties
Caqueret (penalty scored); Kalulu (penalty missed); Pintor (penalty missed); Da Silva (penalty scored); Thomas (penalty scored); Ndicka (penalty scored); Bard (penalty scored); Oualembo (penalty scored)	6–5	(penalty missed) Dest; (penalty scored) Taylor; (penalty scored) Brobbey; (penalty scored) Timber; (penalty missed) Nunnely; (penalty scored) Ünüvar; (penalty scored) Botman; (penalty missed) Hoogerwerf

Groupama OL Training Center, Décines-Charpieu
Attendance: 1,136
Referee: Anastasios Papapetrou (Greece)

12 March 2019
18:00

Barcelona (Spain)	3–0	(Germany) Hertha BSC
Moriba 49'; Marqués 80', 84'	Report

Mini Estadi, Barcelona
Attendance: 1,056
Referee: Paul Tierney (England)

13 March 2019
12:00 (11:00 UTC+0)

Porto (Portugal)	2–0	(England) Tottenham Hotspur
Torres 52'; Baró 57'	Report

CTFD PortoGaia, Vila Nova de Gaia
Attendance: 609
Referee: Halil Umut Meler (Turkey)

12 March 2019
16:00

TSG Hoffenheim (Germany)	0–0	(Ukraine) Dynamo Kyiv
	Report
Penalties
Otto (penalty scored); Amade (penalty scored); Wallquist (penalty scored); Elmkies (penalty scored)	4–2	(penalty scored) Tsitaishvili; (penalty missed) Zavhorodniy; (penalty scored) Supriaha; (penalty missed) Vivcharenko

Dietmar-Hopp-Stadion, Sinsheim
Attendance: 2,650
Referee: Ádám Farkas (Hungary)

6 March 2019
18:00

Atlético Madrid (Spain)	1–2	(Spain) Real Madrid
Mollejo 50'	Report	García 27'; Alberto 56' (pen.)

Cerro del Espino, Majadahonda
Attendance: 1,980
Referee: Marco Di Bello (Italy)

== Quarter-finals ==
=== Summary ===
The quarter-finals were played on 2 and 3 April 2019.

Home team	Score	Away team
Barcelona (Spain)	3–2	(France) Lyon
TSG Hoffenheim (Germany)	4–2	(Spain) Real Madrid
Porto (Portugal)	3–0	(Denmark) Midtjylland
Chelsea (England)	2–2 (4–2 p)	(Croatia) Dinamo Zagreb

=== Matches ===
2 April 2019
18:00

Barcelona (Spain)	3–2	(France) Lyon
Monchu 57'; Fati 61'; Marqués 90+7' (pen.)	Report	Ndicka 11'; Griffiths 89'

Mini Estadi, Barcelona
Attendance: 1,162
Referee: Dennis Higler (Netherlands)

3 April 2019
18:00

TSG Hoffenheim (Germany)	4–2	(Spain) Real Madrid
Geschwill 9'; Stojilković 12'; Linsbichler 74', 90+1'	Report	Alberto 18'; Pedro 85'

Dietmar-Hopp-Stadion, Sinsheim
Attendance: 6,350
Referee: Nikola Dabanović (Montenegro)

2 April 2019
16:00 (15:00 UTC+1)

Porto (Portugal)	3–0	(Denmark) Midtjylland
Ndiaye 15'; Sousa 77'; Borges 89'	Report

CTFD PortoGaia, Vila Nova de Gaia
Attendance: 806
Referee: Andrew Dallas (Scotland)

3 April 2019
16:00 (15:00 UTC+1)

Chelsea (England)	2–2	(Croatia) Dinamo Zagreb
McCormick 77', 87'	Report	Marin 41', 57'
Penalties
McCormick (penalty scored); Gallagher (penalty scored); Guehi (penalty scored); Colley (penalty scored)	4–2	(penalty missed) Franjić; (penalty scored) Pavlak; (penalty scored) Horkaš; (penalty missed) Baturina

Cobham Training Centre, Stoke d'Abernon
Attendance: 120
Referee: Radu Petrescu (Romania)

== Semi-finals ==
=== Summary ===
The semi-finals were played on 26 April 2019 at Colovray Stadium, Nyon.

Team 1	Score	Team 2
Barcelona (Spain)	2–2 (4–5 p)	(England) Chelsea
TSG Hoffenheim (Germany)	0–3	(Portugal) Porto

=== Matches ===
26 April 2019
18:00

Barcelona (Spain)	2–2	(England) Chelsea
Fati 20', 69'	Report	McCormick 66'; Brown 85'
Penalties
Orellana (penalty scored); Jaime (penalty scored); Marqués (penalty scored); González (penalty missed); Fati (penalty scored); Miranda (penalty missed)	4–5	(penalty scored) Brown; (penalty missed) Gallagher; (penalty scored) Colley; (penalty scored) Gilmour; (penalty scored) Maatsen; (penalty scored) Anjorin

Colovray Stadium, Nyon
Attendance: 4,000
Referee: Sandro Schärer (Switzerland)

26 April 2019
14:00

TSG Hoffenheim (Germany)	0–3	(Portugal) Porto
	Report	Baró 39'; Silva 78'; Matos 88'

Colovray Stadium, Nyon
Attendance: 4,000
Referee: Irfan Peljto (Bosnia and Herzegovina)

== Final ==
The final was played on 29 April 2019 at Colovray Stadium, Nyon.

29 April 2019
18:00

Porto (Portugal)	3–1	(England) Chelsea
Vieira 17'; Queirós 55'; Sousa 75'	Report	Redan 53'

Colovray Stadium, Nyon
Attendance: 4,000
Referee: François Letexier (France)
