= 2019 UEFA European Under-19 Championship squads =

Player listings in youth football competition

The 2019 UEFA European Under-19 Championship was an international football tournament held in Armenia from 14 to 27 July 2019.

Each national team submitted a squad of 20 players, two of whom had to be goalkeepers.

Players in boldface have been capped at full international level since the tournament.

Ages are as of the start of the tournament, 14 July 2019.

== Group A ==
=== Armenia ===
Head coach: Artur Voskanyan

No.	Pos.	Player	Date of birth (age)	Club
1	GK	Narek Hovhannisyan	1 March 2000 (aged 19)	(Football Federation of Armenia) Banants II
12	GK	Harutyun Melkonyan	28 June 2001 (aged 18)	(Football Federation of Armenia) Pyunik II
2	DF	Ioury Oganessian	6 August 2000 (aged 18)	(French Football Federation) Lyon-Duchère U19
3	DF	Volodya Samsonyan	1 January 2000 (aged 19)	(Football Federation of Armenia) Ararat II
4	DF	**Arman Ghazaryan**	1 January 2000 (aged 19)	(Football Federation of Armenia) Banants II
5	DF	Felix Khachatryan	1 January 2000 (aged 19)	(Football Federation of Armenia) Banants II
23	DF	**Styopa Mkrtchyan**	1 January 2000 (aged 19)	Unattached
6	MF	Rafik Misakyan	1 January 2000 (aged 19)	(Football Federation of Armenia) Shirak II
7	MF	**Sergey Mkrtchyan**	1 January 2000 (aged 19)	(Football Federation of Armenia) Banants II
8	MF	Arsen Yeghiazaryan (captain)	1 January 2000 (aged 19)	(Football Federation of Armenia) Banants II
11	MF	**Narek Grigoryan**	1 January 2000 (aged 19)	(Football Federation of Armenia) Banants II
17	MF	Aram Khamoyan	1 January 2000 (aged 19)	(Football Federation of Armenia) Lokomotiv
18	MF	Erik Azizyan	1 January 2000 (aged 19)	(Slovak Football Association) MFK Zemplín U19
20	MF	Erjanik Ghoubasaryan	1 January 2000 (aged 19)	(German Football Association) Hamburger SV U19
9	FW	Armen Hovhannisyan	1 January 2000 (aged 19)	(Slovak Football Association) MFK Zemplín
10	FW	German Kurbashyan	1 January 2000 (aged 19)	Unattached
16	FW	Gazar Dermendjan	1 January 2000 (aged 19)	(Football Association of the Czech Republic) Hradec Králové U21
19	FW	Narek Alaverdyan	1 January 2000 (aged 19)	(Football Federation of Armenia) Ararat-Armenia II
21	FW	Grenik Petrosyan	1 January 2000 (aged 19)	(Football Federation of Armenia) Pyunik II
22	FW	Aram Kolozyan	1 January 2000 (aged 19)	(Football Federation of Armenia) Ararat-Armenia II

=== Italy ===
Italy named their squad on 9 July 2019.

Head coach: Carmine Nunziata

No.	Pos.	Player	Date of birth (age)	Club
1	GK	Marco Carnesecchi (captain)	1 July 2000 (aged 19)	(Italian Football Federation) Atalanta
22	GK	Alessandro Russo	31 March 2001 (aged 18)	(Italian Football Federation) Genoa
2	DF	Gabriele Ferrarini	9 April 2000 (aged 19)	(Italian Football Federation) Fiorentina
3	DF	Niccolò Corrado	19 March 2000 (aged 19)	(Italian Football Federation) Internazionale
5	DF	Gabriele Corbo	11 January 2000 (aged 19)	(Italian Football Federation) Bologna
6	DF	Paolo Gozzi	25 April 2001 (aged 18)	(Italian Football Federation) Juventus
12	DF	Gabriele Bellodi	2 September 2000 (aged 18)	(Italian Football Federation) Milan
13	DF	Nicolò Armini	7 March 2001 (aged 18)	(Italian Football Federation) Lazio
15	DF	**Destiny Udogie**	28 November 2002 (aged 16)	(Italian Football Federation) Verona
4	MF	**Samuele Ricci**	21 August 2001 (aged 17)	(Italian Football Federation) Empoli
8	MF	Lorenzo Gavioli	7 January 2000 (aged 19)	(Italian Football Federation) Internazionale
10	MF	**Nicolò Fagioli**	12 February 2001 (aged 18)	(Italian Football Federation) Juventus
14	MF	Hans Nicolussi Caviglia	18 June 2000 (aged 19)	(Italian Football Federation) Juventus
16	MF	Jean Freddi Greco	12 February 2001 (aged 18)	(Italian Football Federation) Torino
17	MF	Manolo Portanova	2 June 2000 (aged 19)	(Italian Football Federation) Juventus
7	FW	**Giacomo Raspadori**	18 February 2000 (aged 19)	(Italian Football Federation) Sassuolo
9	FW	Elia Petrelli	15 August 2001 (aged 17)	(Italian Football Federation) Juventus
11	FW	Eddie Salcedo	1 October 2001 (aged 17)	(Italian Football Federation) Internazionale
18	FW	Davide Merola	27 February 2000 (aged 19)	(Italian Football Federation) Internazionale
19	FW	**Roberto Piccoli**	27 January 2001 (aged 18)	(Italian Football Federation) Atalanta

=== Portugal ===
Head coach: Filipe

No.	Pos.	Player	Date of birth (age)	Club
1	GK	**Celton Biai**	13 August 2000 (aged 18)	(Portuguese Football Federation) Benfica
12	GK	Francisco Meixedo	19 May 2001 (aged 18)	(Portuguese Football Federation) Porto
2	DF	Costinha	26 March 2000 (aged 19)	(Portuguese Football Federation) Rio Ave
3	DF	Gonçalo Loureiro	1 February 2000 (aged 19)	(Portuguese Football Federation) Benfica
4	DF	Gonçalo Cardoso	21 October 2000 (aged 18)	(Portuguese Football Federation) Boavista
5	DF	Tiago Lopes	27 May 2000 (aged 19)	(Portuguese Football Federation) Porto
13	DF	Levi Faustino	31 August 2001 (aged 17)	(Portuguese Football Federation) Porto
14	DF	Tomás Tavares	7 March 2001 (aged 18)	(Portuguese Football Federation) Benfica
6	MF	Diogo Capitão	6 March 2000 (aged 19)	(Portuguese Football Federation) Benfica
8	MF	**Vitinha**	13 February 2000 (aged 19)	(Portuguese Football Federation) Porto
10	MF	Fábio Vieira	30 May 2000 (aged 19)	(Portuguese Football Federation) Porto
15	MF	**Samú Costa**	27 November 2000 (aged 18)	(Portuguese Football Federation) Braga
16	MF	Dani Silva	11 April 2000 (aged 19)	(Portuguese Football Federation) Vitória de Guimarães B
17	MF	Rodrigo Fernandes	23 March 2001 (aged 18)	(Portuguese Football Federation) Sporting CP
7	FW	**João Mário**	3 January 2000 (aged 19)	(Portuguese Football Federation) Porto
9	FW	**Gonçalo Ramos**	20 June 2001 (aged 18)	(Portuguese Football Federation) Benfica
11	FW	Félix Correia	22 January 2001 (aged 18)	(Portuguese Football Federation) Sporting CP
18	FW	Tiago Gouveia	18 June 2001 (aged 18)	(Portuguese Football Federation) Benfica
19	FW	António Gomes	29 August 2000 (aged 18)	(Italian Football Federation) Atalanta
20	FW	Tiago Rodrigues	21 June 2000 (aged 19)	(Portuguese Football Federation) Sporting CP

=== Spain ===
Spain named their squad on 10 July 2019.

Head coach: Santiago Denia

No.	Pos.	Player	Date of birth (age)	Club
1	GK	Álvaro Fernández	10 April 2000 (aged 19)	(Royal Spanish Football Federation) Málaga
13	GK	Arnau Tenas	30 May 2001 (aged 18)	(Royal Spanish Football Federation) Barcelona
2	DF	Víctor Gómez	1 April 2000 (aged 19)	(Royal Spanish Football Federation) Espanyol
3	DF	**Juan Miranda**	19 January 2000 (aged 19)	(Royal Spanish Football Federation) Barcelona
4	DF	**Hugo Guillamón**	31 January 2000 (aged 19)	(Royal Spanish Football Federation) Valencia
5	DF	Víctor Chust	5 March 2000 (aged 19)	(Royal Spanish Football Federation) Real Madrid
12	DF	Ricard Sánchez	22 February 2000 (aged 19)	(Royal Spanish Football Federation) Atlético Madrid
14	DF	**Eric Garcia**	9 January 2001 (aged 18)	(The Football Association) Manchester City
20	DF	Miguel Gutiérrez	27 July 2001 (aged 17)	(Royal Spanish Football Federation) Real Madrid
6	MF	**Antonio Blanco**	23 July 2000 (aged 18)	(Royal Spanish Football Federation) Real Madrid
8	MF	Moha	6 February 2000 (aged 19)	(Royal Spanish Football Federation) Real Madrid
16	MF	Jandro Orellana	7 August 2000 (aged 18)	(Royal Spanish Football Federation) Barcelona
19	MF	Álvaro Sanz	14 February 2001 (aged 18)	(Royal Spanish Football Federation) Barcelona
21	MF	**Ander Barrenetxea**	27 December 2001 (aged 17)	(Royal Spanish Football Federation) Real Sociedad
7	FW	**Ferran Torres**	29 February 2000 (aged 19)	(Royal Spanish Football Federation) Valencia
9	FW	**Abel Ruiz**	28 January 2000 (aged 19)	(Royal Spanish Football Federation) Barcelona
10	FW	**Sergio Gómez**	4 September 2000 (aged 18)	(German Football Association) Borussia Dortmund
17	FW	**Alejandro Marqués**	4 August 2000 (aged 18)	(Royal Spanish Football Federation) Barcelona
18	FW	Víctor Mollejo	21 January 2001 (aged 18)	(Royal Spanish Football Federation) Atlético Madrid
22	FW	**Bryan Gil**	11 February 2001 (aged 18)	(Royal Spanish Football Federation) Sevilla

== Group B ==
=== Czech Republic ===
Czech Republic named their squad on 9 July 2019.

Head coach: Jan Suchopárek

No.	Pos.	Player	Date of birth (age)	Club
1	GK	Jan Vyklický	26 April 2000 (aged 19)	(Football Association of the Czech Republic) Opava
2	DF	Daniel Finěk	25 May 2000 (aged 19)	(Football Association of the Czech Republic) Hradec Králové
3	DF	Václav Míka	1 June 2000 (aged 19)	(Football Association of the Czech Republic) Viktoria Plzeň
4	DF	**David Zima**	8 November 2000 (aged 18)	(Football Association of the Czech Republic) Sigma Olomouc
5	FW	Tomáš Kepl	21 April 2000 (aged 19)	(Football Association of the Czech Republic) Viktoria Plzeň
6	DF	Michal Fukala	22 October 2000 (aged 18)	(Football Association of the Czech Republic) Slovan Liberec
7	DF	Lukáš Hušek	25 October 2000 (aged 18)	(The Football Association) Leicester City
8	MF	Patrik Slaměna	7 July 2000 (aged 19)	(Football Association of the Czech Republic) Fastav Zlín
9	FW	David Píchal	5 October 2000 (aged 18)	(Football Association of the Czech Republic) Prostějov
10	FW	Vasil Kušej	24 May 2000 (aged 19)	(German Football Association) Dynamo Dresden
11	MF	Tomáš Zlatohlávek	22 May 2000 (aged 19)	(Football Association of the Czech Republic) Sigma Olomouc
12	FW	Jakub Selnar	13 April 2000 (aged 19)	(Football Association of the Czech Republic) Viktoria Plzeň
13	MF	Michal Kohút	4 June 2000 (aged 19)	(Football Association of the Czech Republic) Slovácko
14	MF	David Macháček	14 June 2000 (aged 19)	(Football Association of the Czech Republic) Slavia Prague
15	MF	Filip Kaloč	27 February 2000 (aged 19)	(Football Association of the Czech Republic) Baník Ostrava
16	GK	**Matěj Kovář**	17 May 2000 (aged 19)	(The Football Association) Manchester United
17	MF	Michael Hönig	13 January 2000 (aged 19)	(Football Association of the Czech Republic) Slavia Prague
18	DF	David Heidenreich	24 June 2000 (aged 19)	(Italian Football Federation) Atalanta
19	MF	Zbyněk Konopásek	6 March 2000 (aged 19)	(Football Association of the Czech Republic) Sparta Prague
20	MF	Tomáš Solil	1 February 2000 (aged 19)	(Football Association of the Czech Republic) Pardubice

=== France ===
Head coach: Lionel Rouxel

No.	Pos.	Player	Date of birth (age)	Caps	Goals	Club
1	GK	Stefan Bajic	23 December 2001 (aged 17)	2	0	(French Football Federation) Saint-Étienne
2	DF	Giulian Biancone	31 March 2000 (aged 19)	3	0	(Royal Belgian Football Association) Cercle Brugge
3	DF	Melvin Bard	6 November 2000 (aged 18)	2	0	(French Football Federation) Lyon
4	DF	Oumar Solet	7 February 2000 (aged 19)	6	1	(French Football Federation) Lyon
5	DF	**Benoît Badiashile**	26 March 2000 (aged 19)	5	0	(French Football Federation) Monaco
6	MF	Claudio Gomes	23 July 2000 (aged 18)	3	0	(The Football Association) Manchester City
7	MF	**Nathan Ngoumou**	14 March 2000 (aged 19)	1	0	(French Football Federation) Toulouse
8	MF	Julien Ponceau	28 November 2000 (aged 18)	6	0	(French Football Federation) Lorient
9	FW	Alexis Flips	18 January 2000 (aged 19)	5	1	(French Football Federation) Lille
10	MF	Maxence Caqueret	15 February 2000 (aged 19)	6	1	(French Football Federation) Lyon
11	FW	Charles Abi	12 April 2000 (aged 19)	6	3	(French Football Federation) Saint-Étienne
12	DF	**Jean Marcelin**	12 February 2000 (aged 19)	2	1	(French Football Federation) Auxerre
13	DF	**Pierre Kalulu**	5 June 2000 (aged 19)	4	0	(French Football Federation) Lyon
14	DF	Théo Ndicka	20 April 2000 (aged 19)	5	0	(French Football Federation) Lyon
15	MF	Alexandre Phliponeau	20 April 2000 (aged 19)	0	0	(French Football Federation) Marseille
16	GK	Guillaume Dietsch	17 April 2001 (aged 18)	0	0	(French Football Federation) Metz
17	MF	Mathis Picouleau	8 May 2000 (aged 19)	0	0	(French Football Federation) Rennes
18	FW	**Wilson Isidor**	27 August 2000 (aged 18)	3	4	(French Football Federation) Monaco
19	FW	Bridge Ndilu	21 July 2000 (aged 18)	4	1	(French Football Federation) Nantes
20	FW	Yanis Begraoui	4 July 2001 (aged 18)	0	0	(French Football Federation) Auxerre

=== Republic of Ireland ===
Head coach: Tom Mohan

No.	Pos.	Player	Date of birth (age)	Caps	Goals	Club
1	GK	Brian Maher	1 November 2000 (aged 18)	5	0	(Football Association of Ireland) St Patrick's Athletic
2	DF	Andy Lyons	2 August 2000 (aged 18)	5	0	(Football Association of Ireland) Bohemians
3	DF	Kameron Ledwidge	7 April 2001 (aged 18)	2	0	(The Football Association) Southampton
4	DF	**Lee O'Connor**	28 July 2000 (aged 18)	3	0	(The Football Association) Manchester United
5	DF	Oisin McEntee	5 January 2001 (aged 18)	3	0	(The Football Association) Newcastle United
6	DF	**Mark McGuinness**	5 January 2001 (aged 18)	3	1	(The Football Association) Arsenal
7	FW	Ali Reghba	14 January 2000 (aged 19)	6	1	(The Football Association) Leicester City
8	FW	Niall Morahan	30 May 2000 (aged 19)	2	0	(Football Association of Ireland) Sligo Rovers
9	FW	Jonathan Afolabi	14 January 2000 (aged 19)	5	3	Unattached
10	FW	Matt Everitt	24 October 2002 (aged 16)	0	0	(The Football Association) Brighton & Hove Albion
11	FW	Tyreik Wright	22 September 2001 (aged 17)	3	1	(The Football Association) Aston Villa
12	DF	**Andrew Omobamidele**	23 June 2002 (aged 17)	0	0	(The Football Association) Norwich City
13	DF	Jack James	26 January 2000 (aged 19)	5	0	Unattached
14	MF	Barry Coffey	27 March 2001 (aged 18)	1	0	(Scottish Football Association) Celtic
15	MF	Conor Grant	23 July 2001 (aged 17)	2	0	(The Football Association) Sheffield Wednesday
16	GK	George McMahon	16 June 2000 (aged 19)	1	0	(The Football Association) Burnley
17	MF	**Festy Ebosele**	2 August 2002 (aged 16)	2	0	(The Football Association) Derby County
18	MF	**Joe Hodge**	14 September 2002 (aged 16)	0	0	(The Football Association) Manchester City
19	MF	Brandon Kavanagh	21 September 2000 (aged 18)	0	0	(Football Association of Ireland) Shamrock Rovers
20	DF	Ciaran Brennan	19 May 2001 (aged 18)	0	0	(The Football Association) Sheffield Wednesday

=== Norway ===
Head coach: Gunnar Halle

No.	Pos.	Player	Date of birth (age)	Caps	Goals	Club
1	GK	Kristoffer Klaesson	27 November 2000 (aged 18)	6	0	(Norwegian Football Federation) Vålerenga
2	FW	**Marcus Holmgren Pedersen**	16 July 2000 (aged 18)	2	0	(Norwegian Football Federation) Tromsø
3	MF	Sebastian Jarl	11 January 2000 (aged 19)	2	0	(Norwegian Football Federation) Sarpsborg 08
4	DF	Erik Tobias Sandberg	27 February 2000 (aged 19)	4	0	(Norwegian Football Federation) Lillestrøm
5	DF	Colin Rösler	22 April 2000 (aged 19)	5	0	(The Football Association) Manchester City
6	DF	Jonas Tillung Fredriksen	14 November 2000 (aged 18)	6	0	(Norwegian Football Federation) Sogndal
7	MF	**Markus Solbakken**	25 July 2000 (aged 18)	4	0	(Norwegian Football Federation) HamKam
8	MF	Mikael Ugland	24 January 2000 (aged 19)	5	1	(Norwegian Football Federation) Start
9	FW	**Erik Botheim**	10 January 2000 (aged 19)	3	2	(Norwegian Football Federation) Rosenborg
10	MF	Halldor Stenevik	2 February 2000 (aged 19)	6	0	(Norwegian Football Federation) Strømsgodset
11	FW	Noah Holm	23 May 2001 (aged 18)	0	0	(German Football Association) RB Leipzig
12	GK	Mads Hedenstad Christiansen	21 October 2000 (aged 18)	0	0	(Norwegian Football Federation) Lillestrøm
13	DF	Philip Slørdahl	14 November 2000 (aged 18)	0	0	(Norwegian Football Federation) Lillestrøm
14	MF	Elias Hagen	20 January 2000 (aged 19)	2	0	(Norwegian Football Federation) Grorud
15	MF	Johan Hove	7 September 2000 (aged 18)	5	0	(Norwegian Football Federation) Strømsgodset
16	FW	Jakob Dunsby	13 March 2000 (aged 19)	0	0	(Football Association of Finland) HIFK Fotboll
17	FW	**Jørgen Strand Larsen**	6 February 2000 (aged 19)	4	2	(Norwegian Football Federation) Sarpsborg 08
18	MF	Mikael Tørset Johnsen	4 July 2000 (aged 19)	2	0	(Norwegian Football Federation) Rosenborg
20	MF	Edvard Tagseth	23 January 2001 (aged 18)	6	1	(The Football Association) Liverpool
