= 2018–19 UEFA Youth League =

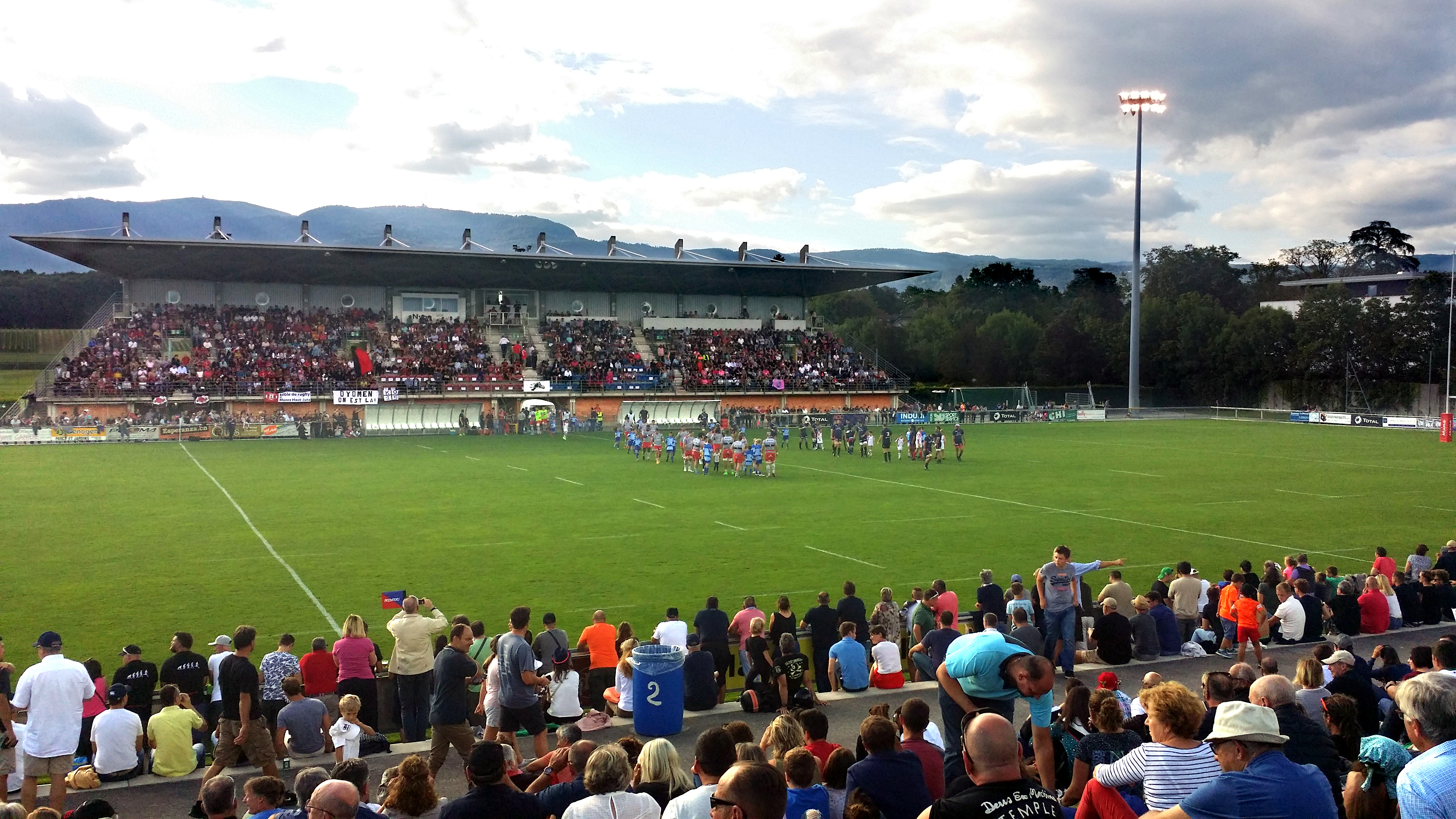
- The Colovray Stadium in Nyon hosted the semi-finals and final.

Tournament details
- Dates: 18 September 2018 – 29 April 2019
- Teams: 64 (from 37 associations)

Final positions
- Champions: (Portugal) Porto (1st title)
- Runners-up: (England) Chelsea

Tournament statistics
- Matches played: 167
- Goals scored: 569 (3.41 per match)
- Top scorer(s): (England) Charlie Brown (Chelsea); 12 goals

The 2018–19 UEFA Youth League was the sixth season of the UEFA Youth League, a European youth club football competition organised by UEFA.

The final was played on 29 April 2019 at the Colovray Stadium in Nyon, Switzerland, between English side Chelsea and Portuguese side Porto. In their first appearance in the final, Porto won 3–1 and secured their first title in the competition, the first ever for a Portuguese team. Barcelona were the defending champions, but were eliminated by Chelsea in the semi-finals, in a rematch of the previous season's final.

== Teams ==
A total of 64 teams from 37 of the 55 UEFA member associations entered the tournament. They were split into two sections, each with 32 teams:

- UEFA Champions League Path: The youth teams of the 32 clubs which qualified for the 2018–19 UEFA Champions League group stage entered the UEFA Champions League Path. Should there have been a vacancy (youth teams not entering), it was filled by a team defined by UEFA.
- Domestic Champions Path: The youth domestic champions of the top 32 associations according to their 2017 UEFA country coefficients entered the Domestic Champions Path. Should there have been a vacancy (associations with no youth domestic competition, as well as youth domestic champions already included in the UEFA Champions League path), it was first filled by the title holders should they had not yet qualified, and then by the youth domestic champions of the next association in the UEFA ranking.

For this season, 37 associations were represented.

Qualified teams for 2018–19 UEFA Youth League
Rank	Association	Teams	
Rank	Association	UEFA Champions League Path	Domestic Champions Path
1	Spain	Barcelona; Atlético Madrid (2017–18 División de Honor Juvenil U18); Real Madrid; Valencia	
2	Germany	Bayern Munich; Schalke 04; TSG Hoffenheim; Borussia Dortmund	Hertha BSC (2017–18 U19 Bundesliga)
3	England	Manchester City; Manchester United; Tottenham Hotspur; Liverpool	Chelsea (2017–18 U18 Premier League)
4	Italy	Juventus; Napoli; Roma; Inter Milan (2017–18 Campionato Primavera U19)	
5	France	Paris Saint-Germain; Monaco; Lyon	Montpellier (2017–18 Championnat National U19)
6	Russia	Lokomotiv Moscow; CSKA Moscow	Anzhi Makhachkala (2017 U17 RFS Cup)
7	Portugal	Porto; Benfica (2017–18 Campeonato Nacional Juniores S19)	
8	Ukraine	Shakhtar Donetsk	Dynamo Kyiv (2017–18 Ukrainian U19 League)
9	Belgium	Club Brugge	Anderlecht (2017–18 Belgian U17 League)
10	Turkey	Galatasaray	Altınordu (2018 U19 Süper Kupa)
11	Czech Republic	Viktoria Plzeň	Sigma Olomouc (2017–18 Czech U19 League)
12	Switzerland	Young Boys	Basel (2017–18 Swiss U18 League)
13	Netherlands	PSV Eindhoven (2017–18 U19 Eredivisie); Ajax	
14	Greece	AEK Athens	PAOK (2017–18 Superleague K20)
15	Austria		Flyeralarm Admira (2017–18 U18 Jugendliga)
16	Croatia		Dinamo Zagreb (2017–18 1. HNL Juniori U19)
17	Romania		Viitorul Constanța (2017–18 Liga Elitelor U19)
18	Denmark		Midtjylland (2017–18 U19 Ligaen)
19	Belarus		Minsk (2017–18 Belarusian U18 League)
20	Poland		Lech Poznań (2017–18 Polish U19 Central Junior League)
21	Sweden		IF Elfsborg (2017 Swedish U17 League)
22	Israel		Maccabi Tel Aviv (2017–18 Israeli U19 Premier League)
23	Scotland		Hamilton Academical (2017–18 Scottish U17 League)
24	Cyprus		AEL Limassol (2017–18 Cypriot U19 League)
25	Norway		Molde (2017 Norwegian U19 Cup)
26	Azerbaijan		Gabala (2017–18 Azerbaijani U19 League)
27	Bulgaria		Septemvri Sofia (2017–18 U18 BFU Cup)
28	Serbia	Red Star Belgrade (2017–18 Serbian U19 League)	
29	Kazakhstan		Astana (2017 Kazakhstani U17 League)
30	Slovenia		Maribor (2017–18 Slovenian U19 League)
31	Slovakia		Žilina (2017–18 Slovak U19 League)
33	Hungary		Illés Akadémia (2017–18 Hungarian U19 League)
34	Moldova		Sheriff Tiraspol (2017–18 Divizia Națională U19)
35	Iceland		KR (2017 Icelandic U19 League)
36	Finland		HJK (2017 U17 B-Junior League)
37	Albania		Vllaznia (2017–18 Albanian U19 League)
38	Republic of Ireland		Bohemians (2017 League of Ireland U19 Division)

Notes

1. ^{TH} Title holders.
2. ^{YC} Teams playing in the UEFA Champions League Path which were also youth domestic champions.
3. ^{PO} Teams playing in the UEFA Champions League Path after their senior team qualified for the Champions League group stage via play-offs.
4. ^{V-LIE} Team playing in the Domestic Champions Path through the vacancy of Liechtenstein (no youth domestic competition).
5. ^{V-YC} Teams playing in the Domestic Champions Path through the vacancies of teams which qualified for the Champions League group stage automatically.
6. ^{V-PO} Teams playing in the Domestic Champions Path through the vacancy of teams which qualified for the Champions League group stage via play-offs.

Associations without any participating teams (no teams qualify for UEFA Champions League group stage, and either with no youth domestic competition or not ranked high enough for a vacancy)

Rank	Association
32	Liechtenstein
39	Bosnia and Herzegovina
40	Georgia
41	Latvia
42	Macedonia
43	Estonia

Rank	Association
44	Montenegro
45	Armenia
46	Luxembourg
47	Northern Ireland
48	Lithuania
49	Malta

Rank	Association
50	Wales
51	Faroe Islands
52	Gibraltar
53	Andorra
54	San Marino
55	Kosovo

== Squads ==
Players had to be born on or after 1 January 2000, with a maximum of five players born between 1 January 1999 and 31 December 1999 allowed in the 40-player squad, and a maximum of three of these players allowed per each match.

Starting from this season, up to five substitutions were permitted per team in each match.

== Round and draw dates ==
The schedule of the competition was as follows (all draws were held at the UEFA headquarters in Nyon, Switzerland, unless stated otherwise).

Schedule for 2018–19 UEFA Youth League
Phase	Round	Draw date	First leg	Second leg
UEFA Champions League Path; Group stage	Matchday 1	30 August 2018 (Monaco)	18–19 September 2018	
UEFA Champions League Path; Group stage	Matchday 2	30 August 2018 (Monaco)	2–3 October 2018	
UEFA Champions League Path; Group stage	Matchday 3	30 August 2018 (Monaco)	23–24 October 2018	
UEFA Champions League Path; Group stage	Matchday 4	30 August 2018 (Monaco)	6–7 November 2018	
UEFA Champions League Path; Group stage	Matchday 5	30 August 2018 (Monaco)	27–28 November 2018	
UEFA Champions League Path; Group stage	Matchday 6	30 August 2018 (Monaco)	11–12 December 2018	
Domestic Champions Path	First round	4 September 2018	3 October 2018	24 October 2018
Domestic Champions Path	Second round	4 September 2018	7 November 2018	28 November 2018
Knockout phase	Knockout round play-offs	17 December 2018	19–20 February 2019	
Knockout phase	Round of 16	22 February 2019	12–13 March 2019	
Knockout phase	Quarter-finals	22 February 2019	2–3 April 2019	
Knockout phase	Semi-finals	22 February 2019	26 April 2019 at Colovray Stadium, Nyon	
Knockout phase	Final	22 February 2019	29 April 2019 at Colovray Stadium, Nyon	

Notes

- For the UEFA Champions League Path group stage, in principle the teams played their matches on Tuesdays and Wednesdays of the matchdays as scheduled for UEFA Champions League, and on the same day as the corresponding senior teams; however, matches could also be played on other dates, including Mondays and Thursdays.
- For the Domestic Champions Path first and second rounds, in principle matches were played on Wednesdays (first round on matchdays 2 and 3, second round on matchdays 4 and 5, as scheduled for UEFA Champions League); however, matches could also be played on other dates, including Mondays, Tuesdays and Thursdays.
- For the play-offs, round of 16 and quarter-finals, in principle matches were played on Tuesdays and Wednesdays of the matchdays as scheduled; however, matches could also be played on other dates, provided they were completed before the following dates:
  - Play-offs: 21 February 2019
  - Round of 16: 15 March 2019
  - Quarter-finals: 5 April 2019

== UEFA Champions League Path ==
For the UEFA Champions League Path, the 32 teams were drawn into eight groups of four. There was no separate draw held, with the group compositions identical to the draw for the 2018–19 UEFA Champions League group stage, which was held on 30 August 2018, 18:00 CEST, at the Grimaldi Forum in Monaco.

In each group, teams played against each other home-and-away in a round-robin format. The eight group winners advanced to the round of 16, while the eight runners-up advanced to the play-offs, where they were joined by the eight second round winners from the Domestic Champions Path.

The matchdays were 18–19 September, 2–3 October, 23–24 October, 6–7 November, 27–28 November, and 11–12 December 2018.

Tiebreakers
Teams were ranked according to points (3 points for a win, 1 point for a draw, 0 points for a loss), and if tied on points, the following tiebreaking criteria were applied, in the order given, to determine the rankings (Regulations Articles 14.03):
1. Points in head-to-head matches among tied teams;
2. Goal difference in head-to-head matches among tied teams;
3. Goals scored in head-to-head matches among tied teams;
4. Away goals scored in head-to-head matches among tied teams;
5. If more than two teams were tied, and after applying all head-to-head criteria above, a subset of teams were still tied, all head-to-head criteria above were reapplied exclusively to this subset of teams;
6. Goal difference in all group matches;
7. Goals scored in all group matches;
8. Away goals scored in all group matches;
9. Wins in all group matches;
10. Away wins in all group matches;
11. Disciplinary points (red card = 3 points, yellow card = 1 point, expulsion for two yellow cards in one match = 3 points);
12. Drawing of lots.

=== Group A ===
Pos	Team	Pld	W	D	L	GF	GA	GD	Pts	Qualification	ATM	MON	BRU	DOR
1	(Spain) Atlético Madrid	6	4	0	2	15	8	+7	12	Round of 16	—	3–0	1–2	4–0
2	(France) Monaco	6	3	1	2	9	9	0	10	Play-offs	0–2	—	3–1	1–1
3	(Belgium) Club Brugge	6	2	1	3	10	11	−1	7		3–1	2–3	—	1–1
4	(Germany) Borussia Dortmund	6	1	2	3	7	13	−6	5		3–4	0–2	2–1	—

Source: UEFA

=== Group B ===
Pos	Team	Pld	W	D	L	GF	GA	GD	Pts	Qualification	BAR	TOT	INT	PSV
1	(Spain) Barcelona	6	3	2	1	8	6	+2	11	Round of 16	—	0–2	2–1	2–1
2	(England) Tottenham Hotspur	6	2	3	1	10	8	+2	9	Play-offs	1–1	—	2–4	2–0
3	(Italy) Inter Milan	6	2	1	3	10	9	+1	7		0–2	1–1	—	3–0
4	(Netherlands) PSV Eindhoven	6	1	2	3	6	11	−5	5		1–1	2–2	2–1	—

Source: UEFA

=== Group C ===
Pos	Team	Pld	W	D	L	GF	GA	GD	Pts	Qualification	LIV	PAR	NAP	RSB
1	(England) Liverpool	6	4	1	1	17	7	+10	13	Round of 16	—	5–2	5–0	2–1
2	(France) Paris Saint-Germain	6	4	1	1	13	10	+3	13	Play-offs	3–2	—	0–0	2–1
3	(Italy) Napoli	6	1	3	2	9	15	−6	6		1–1	2–5	—	5–3
4	(Serbia) Red Star Belgrade	6	0	1	5	6	13	−7	1		0–2	0–1	1–1	—

Source: UEFA

=== Group D ===
Pos	Team	Pld	W	D	L	GF	GA	GD	Pts	Qualification	POR	LMO	GAL	SCH
1	(Portugal) Porto	6	4	1	1	13	5	+8	13	Round of 16	—	2–1	2–2	3–0
2	(Russia) Lokomotiv Moscow	6	3	1	2	8	5	+3	10	Play-offs	2–1	—	0–1	0–0
3	(Turkey) Galatasaray	6	3	1	2	8	6	+2	10		0–2	0–1	—	3–0
4	(Germany) Schalke 04	6	0	1	5	2	15	−13	1		0–3	1–4	1–2	—

Source: UEFA

=== Group E ===
Pos	Team	Pld	W	D	L	GF	GA	GD	Pts	Qualification	AJX	BEN	BAY	AEK
1	(Netherlands) Ajax	6	3	2	1	23	8	+15	11	Round of 16	—	3–0	1–2	6–0
2	(Portugal) Benfica	6	3	2	1	14	9	+5	11	Play-offs	3–3	—	3–0	3–0
3	(Germany) Bayern Munich	6	3	2	1	12	8	+4	11		2–2	2–2	—	2–0
4	(Greece) AEK Athens	6	0	0	6	2	26	−24	0		1–8	1–3	0–4	—

Source: UEFA

=== Group F ===
Pos	Team	Pld	W	D	L	GF	GA	GD	Pts	Qualification	HOF	LYO	MCI	SHK
1	(Germany) TSG Hoffenheim	6	3	2	1	15	10	+5	11	Round of 16	—	3–1	5–2	1–1
2	(France) Lyon	6	3	2	1	13	8	+5	11	Play-offs	3–3	—	2–0	2–0
3	(England) Manchester City	6	2	1	3	10	14	−4	7		2–1	1–4	—	4–1
4	(Ukraine) Shakhtar Donetsk	6	0	3	3	5	11	−6	3		1–2	1–1	1–1	—

Source: UEFA

=== Group G ===
Pos	Team	Pld	W	D	L	GF	GA	GD	Pts	Qualification	RMA	ROM	PLZ	CSKA
1	(Spain) Real Madrid	6	6	0	0	20	7	+13	18	Round of 16	—	3–1	3–2	2–1
2	(Italy) Roma	6	3	0	3	14	17	−3	9	Play-offs	1–6	—	3–4	3–1
3	(Czech Republic) Viktoria Plzeň	6	1	2	3	11	14	−3	5		1–2	2–4	—	1–1
4	(Russia) CSKA Moscow	6	0	2	4	6	13	−7	2		1–4	1–2	1–1	—

Source: UEFA

=== Group H ===
Pos	Team	Pld	W	D	L	GF	GA	GD	Pts	Qualification	MUN	JUV	YB	VAL
1	(England) Manchester United	6	5	1	0	20	7	+13	16	Round of 16	—	4–1	6–2	4–0
2	(Italy) Juventus	6	3	1	2	11	11	0	10	Play-offs	2–2	—	2–1	3–0
3	(Switzerland) Young Boys	6	2	1	3	12	15	−3	7		1–2	4–2	—	3–3
4	(Spain) Valencia	6	0	1	5	4	14	−10	1		1–2	0–1	0–1	—

Source: UEFA

== Domestic Champions Path ==
For the Domestic Champions Path, the 32 teams were drawn into two rounds of two-legged home-and-away ties. The draw for both the first round and second round was held on 4 September 2018, 14:00 CEST, at the UEFA headquarters in Nyon, Switzerland. There were no seedings, but the 32 teams were split into groups defined by sporting and geographical criteria prior to the draw. In both rounds, if the aggregate score is tied after full time of the second leg, the away goals rule is used to decide the winner. If still tied, the match is decided by a penalty shoot-out (no extra time is played). The eight second round winners advance to the play-offs, where they are joined by the eight group runners-up from the UEFA Champions League Path (group stage).

=== First round ===
The first legs were played on 2, 3 and 4 October 2018, and the second legs on 23 and 24 October 2018.

Team 1	Agg.	Team 2	1st leg	2nd leg
Altınordu (Turkey)	3–2	(Finland) HJK	1–1	2–1
Žilina (Slovakia)	1–7	(France) Montpellier	1–5	0–2
Basel (Switzerland)	4–4 (2–3 p)	(Scotland) Hamilton Academical	2–2	2–2
Dynamo Kyiv (Ukraine)	6–1	(Bulgaria) Septemvri Sofia	1–0	5–1
KR (Iceland)	1–3 (Note: Order of legs reversed after original draw.)	(Sweden) IF Elfsborg	1–2	0–1
Anderlecht (Belgium)	1–1 (a)	(Austria) Flyeralarm Admira	0–0	1–1
Midtjylland (Denmark)	4–2	(Republic of Ireland) Bohemians	2–1	2–1
Chelsea (England)	14–1	(Norway) Molde	10–1	4–0
AEL Limassol (Cyprus)	1–4	(Greece) PAOK	1–2	0–2
Sigma Olomouc (Czech Republic)	7–3	(Slovenia) Maribor	4–1	3–2
Gabala (Azerbaijan)	4–2	(Moldova) Sheriff Tiraspol	1–1	3–1
Hertha BSC (Germany)	5–2	(Poland) Lech Poznań	2–0	3–2
Astana (Kazakhstan)	7–1	(Albania) Vllaznia	3–1	4–0
Anzhi Makhachkala (Russia)	3–5	(Israel) Maccabi Tel Aviv	3–2	0–3
Viitorul Constanța (Romania)	0–3	(Croatia) Dinamo Zagreb	0–1	0–2
Minsk (Belarus)	4–3	(Hungary) Illés Akadémia	1–0	3–3

=== Second round ===
The first legs were played on 6 and 7 November 2018, and the second legs were played on 27 and 28 November 2018.

Team 1	Agg.	Team 2	1st leg	2nd leg
Anderlecht (Belgium)	2–3	(Ukraine) Dynamo Kyiv	1–1	1–2
Midtjylland (Denmark)	4–1	(Scotland) Hamilton Academical	2–0	2–1
Altınordu (Turkey)	2–5	(France) Montpellier	2–4	0–1
IF Elfsborg (Sweden)	0–9	(England) Chelsea	0–3	0–6
PAOK (Greece)	3–1	(Belarus) Minsk	2–1	1–0
Gabala (Azerbaijan)	1–4	(Germany) Hertha BSC	1–3	0–1
Astana (Kazakhstan)	2–4	(Croatia) Dinamo Zagreb	1–1	1–3
Sigma Olomouc (Czech Republic)	3–3 (a)	(Israel) Maccabi Tel Aviv	1–1	2–2

== Knockout phase ==
The draw for the round of 16 onwards was held on 22 February 2019, 14:00 CET (UTC+1), at the UEFA headquarters in Nyon, Switzerland. The mechanism of the draws for each round was as follows:

- In the draw for the round of 16, there were no seedings, and the 16 teams (eight UEFA Champions League Path group winners and eight play-off winners) were drawn into eight ties. Teams from the same UEFA Champions League Path group could not be drawn against each other, but teams from the same association could be drawn against each other. The draw also decided the home team for each round of 16 match.
- In the draws for the quarter-finals onwards, there were no seedings, and teams from the same UEFA Champions League Path group or the same association could be drawn against each other (the identity of the quarter-final winners and onwards was not known at the time of the draws). The draws also decided the home team for each quarter-final, and which quarter-final and semi-final winners were designated as the "home" team for each semi-final and final (for administrative purposes as they were played at a neutral venue).

Each tie was played over a single match. If the score was tied after full time, the match was decided by a penalty shoot-out (no extra time was played).

=== Bracket ===
Knockout round play-offs
(Ukraine) Dynamo Kyiv	3
(Italy) Juventus	0
(Greece) PAOK	0
(England) Tottenham Hotspur	1
(Denmark) Midtjylland (p)	1 (4)
(Italy) Roma	1 (2)
(Germany) Hertha BSC	2
(France) Paris Saint-Germain	1
(Czech Republic) Sigma Olomouc	0
(France) Lyon	2
(England) Chelsea	3
(France) Monaco	1
(France) Montpellier	2
(Portugal) Benfica	1
(Croatia) Dinamo Zagreb (p)	1 (5)
(Russia) Lokomotiv Moscow	1 (4)

Round of 16
(Germany) TSG Hoffenheim (p)	0 (4)
(Ukraine) Dynamo Kyiv	0 (2)
(Spain) Atlético Madrid	1
(Spain) Real Madrid	2
(Portugal) Porto	2
(England) Tottenham Hotspur	0
(Denmark) Midtjylland	3
(England) Manchester United	1
(Spain) Barcelona	3
(Germany) Hertha BSC	0
(France) Lyon (p)	2 (6)
(Netherlands) Ajax	2 (5)
(England) Chelsea	2
(France) Montpellier	1
(Croatia) Dinamo Zagreb (p)	1 (4)
(England) Liverpool	1 (3)

Quarter-finals
(Germany) TSG Hoffenheim	4
(Spain) Real Madrid	2
(Portugal) Porto	3
(Denmark) Midtjylland	0
(Spain) Barcelona	3
(France) Lyon	2
(England) Chelsea (p)	2 (4)
(Croatia) Dinamo Zagreb	2 (2)

Semi-finals
26 April – Nyon
(Germany) TSG Hoffenheim	0
(Portugal) Porto	3
26 April – Nyon
(Spain) Barcelona	2 (4)
(England) Chelsea (p)	2 (5)

Final
29 April – Nyon
(Portugal) Porto	3
(England) Chelsea	1

=== Knockout round play-offs ===
The draw for the knockout round play-offs was held on 17 December 2018, 14:15 CET (UTC+1), at the UEFA headquarters in Nyon, Switzerland. The eight second round winners from the Domestic Champions Path were drawn against the eight group runners-up from the UEFA Champions League Path, with the teams from the Domestic Champions Path hosting the match. Teams from the same association could not be drawn against each other. Each tie was played over a single match. If the score was tied after full time, the match was decided by a penalty shoot-out (no extra time was played). The matches were played on 19 and 20 February 2019. The eight play-off winners advanced to the round of 16, where they were joined by the eight group winners from the UEFA Champions League Path.

Home team	Score	Away team
PAOK (Greece)	0–1	(England) Tottenham Hotspur
Dinamo Zagreb (Croatia)	1–1 (5–4 p)	(Russia) Lokomotiv Moscow
Dynamo Kyiv (Ukraine)	3–0	(Italy) Juventus
Chelsea (England)	3–1	(France) Monaco
Montpellier (France)	2–1	(Portugal) Benfica
Hertha BSC (Germany)	2–1	(France) Paris Saint-Germain
Midtjylland (Denmark)	1–1 (4–2 p)	(Italy) Roma
Sigma Olomouc (Czech Republic)	0–2	(France) Lyon

=== Round of 16 ===
The round of 16 matches were played on 6, 12 and 13 March 2019.

Home team	Score	Away team
Chelsea (England)	2–1	(France) Montpellier
Midtjylland (Denmark)	3–1	(England) Manchester United
Dinamo Zagreb (Croatia)	1–1 (4–3 p)	(England) Liverpool
Lyon (France)	2–2 (6–5 p)	(Netherlands) Ajax
Barcelona (Spain)	3–0	(Germany) Hertha BSC
Porto (Portugal)	2–0	(England) Tottenham Hotspur
TSG Hoffenheim (Germany)	0–0 (4–2 p)	(Ukraine) Dynamo Kyiv
Atlético Madrid (Spain)	1–2	(Spain) Real Madrid

=== Quarter-finals ===
The quarter-finals were played on 2 and 3 April 2019.

Home team	Score	Away team
Barcelona (Spain)	3–2	(France) Lyon
TSG Hoffenheim (Germany)	4–2	(Spain) Real Madrid
Porto (Portugal)	3–0	(Denmark) Midtjylland
Chelsea (England)	2–2 (4–2 p)	(Croatia) Dinamo Zagreb

=== Semi-finals ===
The semi-finals were played on 26 April 2019 at Colovray Stadium, Nyon.

Team 1	Score	Team 2
Barcelona (Spain)	2–2 (4–5 p)	(England) Chelsea
TSG Hoffenheim (Germany)	0–3	(Portugal) Porto

=== Final ===
The final was played on 29 April 2019 at Colovray Stadium, Nyon.

29 April 2019
18:00 UTC+2

Porto (Portugal)	3–1	(England) Chelsea
Vieira 17'; Queirós 55'; Sousa 75'	Report	Redan 53'

Colovray Stadium, Nyon
Attendance: 4,000
Referee: François Letexier (France)

== Top scorers ==
Rank	Player	Team	Goals			
Rank	Player	Team	GS	DC	KO	Total
1	(England) Charlie Brown	(England) Chelsea	—	9	3	12
2	(Portugal) Romário Baró	(Portugal) Porto	4	—	2	6
2	(Germany) Nicolas-Gerrit Kühn	(Netherlands) Ajax	6	—	0	6
2	(Brazil) Rodrigo	(Spain) Real Madrid	6	—	0	6
2	(Denmark) Casper Tengstedt	(Denmark) Midtjylland	—	5	1	6
6	(Spain) Alberto	(Spain) Real Madrid	3	—	2	5
6	(Spain) Sergio Camello	(Spain) Atlético Madrid	5	—	0	5
6	(Argentina) Facundo Colidio	(Italy) Inter Milan	5	—	—	5
6	(Italy) Gianluca Gaetano	(Italy) Napoli	5	—	—	5
6	(England) Mason Greenwood	(England) Manchester United	5	—	0	5
6	(Panama) Eduardo Guerrero	(Israel) Maccabi Tel Aviv	—	5	—	5
6	(France) Lenny Pintor	(France) Lyon	3	—	2	5
6	(Netherlands) Daishawn Redan	(England) Chelsea	—	4	1	5
6	(Italy) Alessio Riccardi	(Italy) Roma	5	—	0	5
6	(Portugal) Fábio Silva	(Portugal) Porto	4	—	1	5
6	(Portugal) Nuno Santos	(Portugal) Benfica	5	—	0	5

Source: UEFA

Notes

- — denotes the team did not participate in this stage.
