= Antonio Marin (footballer, born 2001) =

Croatian footballer (born 2001)

Personal information
- Date of birth: 9 January 2001 (age 25)
- Place of birth: Zagreb, Croatia
- Height: 1.84 m (6 ft 0 in)
- Positions: Winger; second striker

Team information
- Current team: Olimpija Ljubljana
- Number: 99

Youth career
- 2007–2009: NK ZET
- 2009–2017: Dinamo Zagreb

Senior career*
Years	Team	Apps	(Gls)
2018–2020	Dinamo Zagreb II	9	(8)
2018–2024	Dinamo Zagreb	33	(1)
2020–2021	→ Monza (loan)	6	(0)
2021	→ Lokomotiva (loan)	15	(0)
2021–2022	→ Šibenik (loan)	35	(8)
2022–2023	→ Rijeka (loan)	18	(3)
2024–	Olimpija Ljubljana	9	(4)

International career
2015	Croatia U15	5	(1)
2016	Croatia U16	4	(0)
2016–2018	Croatia U17	27	(7)
2018–2020	Croatia U19	14	(10)
2021	Croatia U20	2	(2)
2019–2022	Croatia U21	15	(1)
- * Club domestic league appearances and goals as of 29 March 2025

Antonio Marin (Croatian pronunciation: [antǒːnio mâriːn]; born 9 January 2001) is a Croatian professional footballer who plays for Slovenian PrvaLiga club Olimpija Ljubljana. A versatile forward, Marin is capable of playing as either a winger, a second striker, or a striker.

He has represented Croatia internationally from under-15 to under-21 level.

== Club career ==
=== Dinamo Zagreb ===
Born in Zagreb, Marin started his youth career with ZET, before signing for the academy of Dinamo Zagreb in 2009. In spite of being strongly linked to AC Milan, Manchester City, Paris Saint-Germain and Juventus in September 2017, he signed a three-year long professional contract with the club on 9 October 2017. On 19 May 2018, he made his first team debut, replacing Petar Stojanović in a 3–1 victory over Inter Zaprešić.

On 12 March 2019, in a UEFA Youth League round of 16 game against Liverpool, he provided Leon Šipoš with an assist for the equalizer. The game ended as a 1–1 draw and saw Dinamo win 5–4 on penalties. On 3 April, in a quarter-final against Chelsea, he netted a brace to put Dinamo two up; however, Chelsea came from behind with Luke McCormick's brace and defeated Dinamo 4–2 on penalties. On 11 December, in another Youth League campaign, he scored the only goal in a 1–0 victory over Manchester City and secured Dinamo's spot in the play-offs.

After the departure of Dani Olmo in January 2020, Marin inherited his number 7 shirt. On 6 June 2020, he scored his first senior goal for Dinamo in a 3–1 win over Varaždin.

==== Loan to Monza ====
On 1 October 2020, Marin was sent on a one-year loan to newly promoted Serie B side Monza, with an option for purchase which becomes an obligation under certain conditions. He made his debut on 7 November, coming on as a substitute for Dany Mota in a 2–0 home victory over Frosinone. His loan ended in January 2021, as he was dissatisfied with his playtime.

==== Loan to Lokomotiva ====
On 4 February 2021, he moved on loan to Lokomotiva.

==== Loan to Šibenik ====
In June 2021, Marin joined Šibenik on a season-long loan.

==== Loan on Rijeka ====
In December 2022, Marin was loaned out to Rijeka by Dinamo Zagreb on a short-term deal.

=== Olimpija Ljubljana ===
On 17 January 2024, Marin signed for reigning Slovenian PrvaLiga champions Olimpija Ljubljana on a three-year contract following the termination of his contract with Dinamo Zagreb. In his second appearance for the club on 17 February, he scored a brace against Radomlje in a 3–1 win, but suffered a knee injury and had to undergo surgery.

== Style of play ==
Although Marin generally plays as a winger, his versatility in attack makes him adept both as a second striker and a striker. He is known for his speed, dribbling abilities and skill in set pieces.

== Career statistics ==
=== Club ===
As of match played 20 May 2022

Club	Season	League			National cup (Note: Includes Croatian Cup, Coppa Italia)		Continental		Total	
Club	Season	Division	Apps	Goals	Apps	Goals	Apps	Goals	Apps	Goals
Dinamo Zagreb II	2018–19	Druga HNL	6	5	—		—		6	5
Dinamo Zagreb II	2020–21	Druga HNL	3	3	—		—		3	3
Dinamo Zagreb II	Total		9	8	0	0	0	0	9	8
Dinamo Zagreb	2017–18	Prva HNL	1	0	0	0	—		1	0
Dinamo Zagreb	2018–19	Prva HNL	7	0	1	0	0	0	8	0
Dinamo Zagreb	2019–20	Prva HNL	13	1	1	0	0	0	14	1
Dinamo Zagreb	2020–21	Prva HNL	0	0	1	0	0	0	1	0
Dinamo Zagreb	Total		21	1	3	0	0	0	24	1
Monza (loan)	2020–21	Serie B	6	0	1	0	—		7	0
Lokomotiva (loan)	2020–21	Prva HNL	15	0	—		—		15	0
Šibenik (loan)	2021–22	Prva HNL	35	8	2	0	—		37	8
Career total			86	17	6	0	0	0	92	17

== Honours ==
Dinamo Zagreb

- Prva HNL: 2017–18, 2018–19, 2019–20
- Croatian Cup: 2017–18
- Croatian Super Cup: 2019, 2022, 2023
