= Devid Eugene Bouah =

Italian footballer (born 2001)

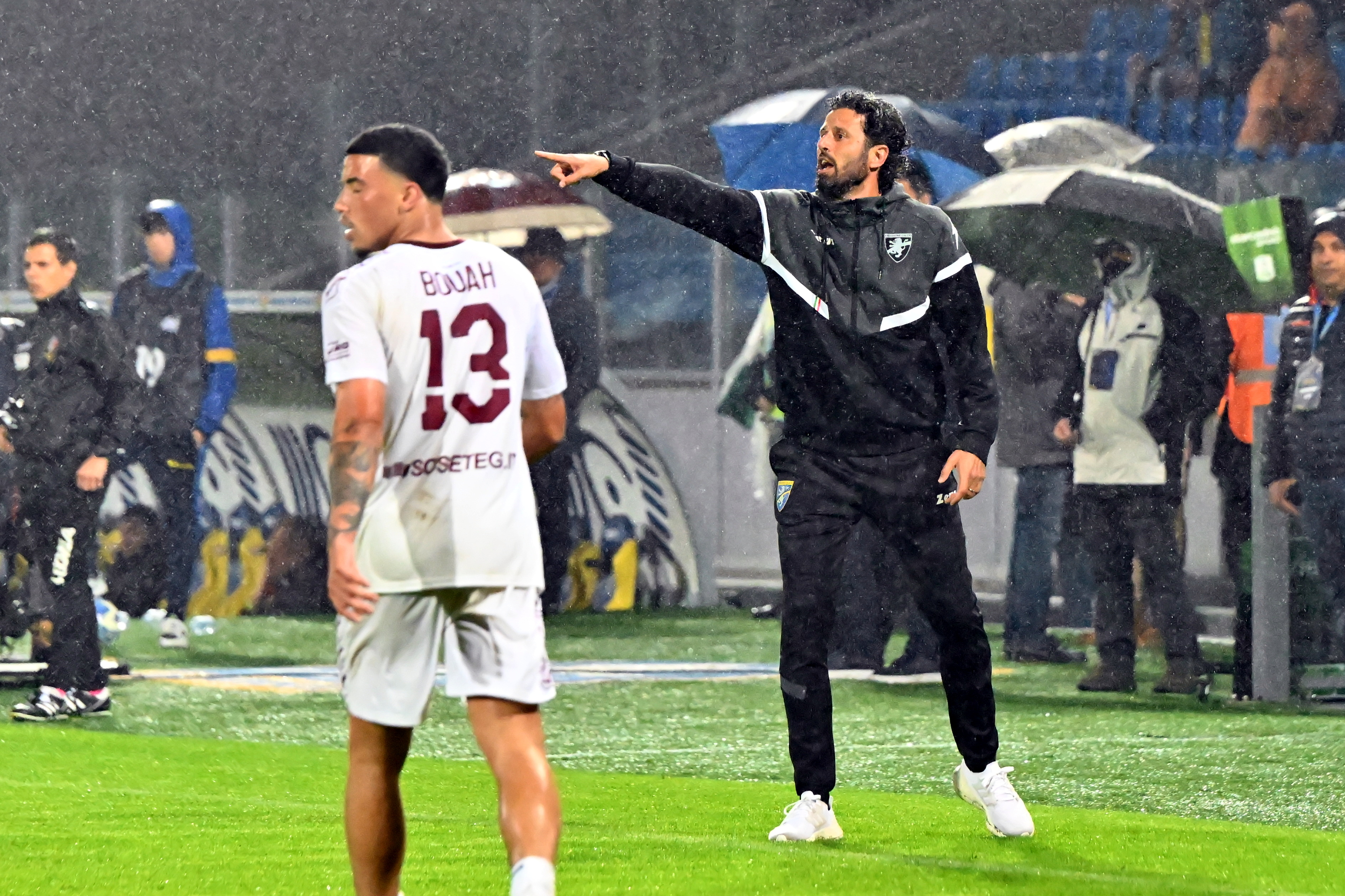
- Jackson (on the left) playing for Reggina

Personal information
- Date of birth: 13 August 2001 (age 25)
- Place of birth: Rome, Italy
- Height: 1.83 m (6 ft 0 in)
- Position: Defender

Team information
- Current team: Cambuur
- Number: 2

Youth career
- –2020: Roma

Senior career*
| Years | Team | Apps | (Gls) |
| 2018–2022 | Roma | 0 | (0) |
| 2020–2021 | → Cosenza (loan) | 11 | (0) |
| 2021–2022 | → Teramo (loan) | 19 | (0) |
| 2022–2023 | Reggina | 9 | (1) |
| 2023–2024 | Catania | 24 | (2) |
| 2024–2026 | Carrarese | 55 | (5) |
| 2026– | Cambuur | 1 | (0) |

International career^{‡}
| 2017–2018 | Italy U17 | 3 | (0) |
| 2018 | Italy U18 | 4 | (0) |
| 2018–2019 | Italy U19 | 4 | (0) |
- * Club domestic league appearances and goals as of 23 August 2026 ‡ National team caps and goals as of 9 September 2019

Devid Eugene Bouah (born 13 August 2001) is an Italian professional footballer who plays as a defender for Eredivisie club Cambuur.

== Club career ==
He was raised in the youth teams of Roma. He played for Roma in the 2017–18 and 2018–19 editions of the UEFA Youth League. He was called to Roma's senior squad in February 2018 but remained on the bench. He made his debut for Roma on 20 July 2018 in a pre-season friendly against Avellino. In November 2018, he suffered an ACL tear which forced him to miss most of the 2018–19 season. In the first game of the 2019–20 Campionato Primavera 1, he suffered an ACL tear again, making him miss the 2019–20 season.

On 2 October 2020, he joined Serie B club Cosenza on a season-long loan. He made his Serie B debut for Cosenza on 17 October 2020 in a game against Cittadella. He substituted Angelo Corsi in the 69th minute.

On 31 August 2021 he joined Teramo on loan.

On 1 September 2022, Bouah signed a multi-year contract with Reggina. After Reggina's exclusion from Serie B in August 2023, he joined Serie C club Catania on a free transfer.

On 28 August 2024, Bouah signed a two-season contract with Carrarese in Serie B.

On 17 August 2026, Bouah moved to the Netherlands and joined Cambuur on a two-season deal.

== International career ==
He was first called up to represent Italy in October 2017 for the Under-17 Euro qualifiers. He was not selected for the final tournament squad or the squad for the 2019 UEFA European Under-19 Championship due to his injuries.

== Personal life ==
Bouah was born to an Italian mother and an Ivorian father who separated a few years after his birth, leaving the mother to raise him. He has a younger brother, Ethan (born 2005), who is a footballer too.
