= Maxen Kapo =

French footballer (born 2001)

Personal information
- Full name: Maxen Amadou Kapo
- Date of birth: 19 January 2001 (age 25)
- Place of birth: Quincy-sous-Sénart, France
- Height: 1.92 m (6 ft 4 in)
- Position: Midfielder

Youth career
- 2007–2013: Malakoff
- 2013–2020: Paris Saint-Germain

Senior career*
Years	Team	Apps	(Gls)
2020–2021	Paris Saint-Germain	0	(0)
2021–2025	Lausanne-Sport	1	(0)
2022–2024	Lausanne-Sport U21	12	(0)
2022–2023	→ Étoile Carouge (loan)	24	(2)

International career
2020	France U19	1	(0)
- * Club domestic league appearances and goals as of 1 July 2025

Maxen Amadou Kapo (born 19 January 2001) is a French professional footballer who plays as a midfielder.

== Club career ==
=== Paris Saint-Germain ===
An academy graduate of Paris Saint-Germain, Kapo signed his first professional contract on 14 March 2019. However, despite four appearances on the bench during the 2020–21 season, he failed to make a breakthrough in the first team.

=== Lausanne-Sport ===
On 17 June 2021, Kapo joined Swiss Super League club Lausanne-Sport. He signed a four-year contract with the club. He made his professional debut on 7 August in a 3–1 league defeat against Grasshopper.

=== Étoile Carouge (loan) ===
In July 2022, Kapo joined Swiss Promotion League club Étoile Carouge on a season long loan deal.

== International career ==
Kapo is a France youth international. He made his debut for the France U19 team on 25 February 2020 in a 3–1 defeat against Portugal.

== Personal life ==
Born in France, Kapo is of Ivorian descent. His uncle, Olivier, is a former France international footballer, who was part of French squad that won the 2003 FIFA Confederations Cup.
