= Enes Tubluk =

German-Turkish footballer

Personal information
- Full name: Enes Olgun Tubluk
- Date of birth: 3 June 2000 (age 26)
- Place of birth: Eberbach, Germany
- Height: 1.72 m (5 ft 8 in)
- Position: Forward

Team information
- Current team: VfR Mannheim
- Number: 7

Youth career
- SC Kirchheim
- Eintracht Braunschweig
- –2016: Karlsruher SC
- 2016–2019: 1899 Hoffenheim

Senior career*
Years	Team	Apps	(Gls)
2019–2020	1899 Hoffenheim II	8	(1)
2020–2021	Viktoria Köln	6	(0)
2021–2022	Uşakspor	23	(3)
2022–2023	Şanlıurfaspor	22	(1)
2023–2025	Nöttingen	50	(16)
2025–	VfR Mannheim	16	(2)
- * Club domestic league appearances and goals as of 30 June 2026

Enes Olgun Tubluk (born 3 June 2000) is a German-Turkish footballer who plays as a forward for German club VfR Mannheim.

== Career ==
Tubluk signed for Viktoria Köln from 1899 Hoffenheim II in August 2020.
