= Domenico Alberico =

Italian footballer (born 1999)

Personal information
- Full name: Domenico Roberto Alberico
- Date of birth: 23 January 1999 (age 27)
- Place of birth: Pforzheim, Germany
- Height: 1.75 m (5 ft 9 in)
- Position: Midfielder

Team information
- Current team: Chemnitzer FC
- Number: 10

Youth career
- –2014: Karlsruhe
- 2014–2018: Hoffenheim

Senior career*
Years	Team	Apps	(Gls)
2018–2020	Hoffenheim II	45	(5)
2020–2021	Stuttgart II	29	(2)
2021–2022	Viterbese	13	(0)
2023	Würzburger Kickers	13	(1)
2023–2025	SGV Freiberg	53	(7)
2025–	Chemnitzer FC	40	(9)

International career^{‡}
2015	Germany U16	2	(0)
2019	Italy U20	10	(0)
- * Club domestic league appearances and goals as of 23 September 2026 ‡ National team caps and goals as of 18 November 2019

Domenico Roberto Alberico (born 23 January 1999) is a professional footballer who plays as a midfielder for Regionalliga Nordost club Chemnitzer FC. Born in Germany, he has most recently represented Italy at youth level.

== Club career ==
Born in Pforzheim, Alberico started his career in Karlsruhe's youth sector.

In 2014, he moved to Hoffenheim. From 2018, he played for Hoffenheim's reserve team in the Regionalliga.

He left Hoffenheim and joined VfB Stuttgart's reserve team in the 2020–21 season.

On 13 August 2021, he moved to Italian Serie C club Viterbese. On 2 August 2022, Alberico's contract with Viterbese was terminated by mutual consent.

On 17 January 2023, after a successful trial with Würzburger Kickers, Alberico officially joined the Regionalliga Bayern club on a free transfer.

On 27 August 2023, Alberico moved to SGV Freiberg.

In 18.6.2025 move to Chemnitzer FC.

== International career ==
Alberico made his Germany U-16 debut on 18 March 2015. Ironically, this match was played against his ancestral country of Italy.

He represented Italy at the 2019 FIFA U-20 World Cup.
