= Rodel Richards =

English footballer (born 2000)

Personal information
- Full name: Rodel Kurai Richards
- Date of birth: 5 September 2000 (age 26)
- Place of birth: London, England
- Height: 1.74 m (5 ft 9 in)
- Position: Forward

Youth career
- –2021: Tottenham Hotspur

Senior career*
Years	Team	Apps	(Gls)
2022	Hebar Pazardzhik	0	(0)
2022–2024	Vorskla Poltava	1	(0)
- * Club domestic league appearances and goals as of 24 May 2024

Rodel Kurai Richards (born 5 September 2000) is an English professional footballer who plays as a forward.

== Career ==
Richards started his career with Tottenham Hotspur before being released in the summer of 2021. The following year, he joined Bulgarian side Hebar but left the club without making an appearance. In October 2022, he joined Ukrainian side Vorskla Poltava on a three-year deal. On 19 October 2022, Richards made his professional debut in the Ukrainian Premier League as a late substitute in a 1–0 loss to Rukh Lviv.

== Career statistics ==
As of match played 19 October 2022

Appearances and goals by club, season and competition
Club	Season	League			National cup (Note: Includes Bulgarian Cup and Ukrainian Cup)		Other		Total	
Club	Season	Division	Apps	Goals	Apps	Goals	Apps	Goals	Apps	Goals
Tottenham Hotspur U21	2018–19	—			—		2 (Note: Appearance(s) in EFL Trophy)	0	2	0
Tottenham Hotspur U21	2019–20	—			—		3	0	3	0
Tottenham Hotspur U21	Total		—		—		5	0	5	0
Hebar Pazardzhik	2022–23	Bulgarian First League	0	0	0	0	—		0	0
Vorskla Poltava	2022–23	Ukrainian Premier League	1	0	—		0	0	1	0
Career total			1	0	0	0	5	0	6	0
