= Benjamin Wallquist =

Austrian footballer (born 2000)

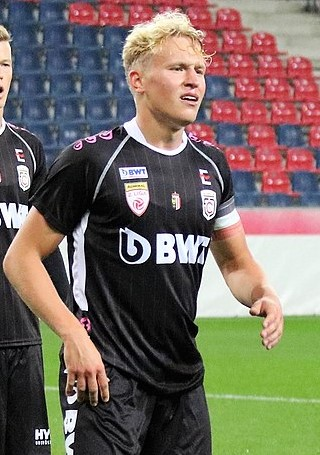

Personal information
- Date of birth: 24 January 2000 (age 26)
- Place of birth: Wien, Austria
- Height: 1.90 m (6 ft 3 in)
- Position: Centre back

Team information
- Current team: Floridsdorfer AC
- Number: 4

Youth career
- –2014: Admira Wacker
- 2014–2017: Red Bull Salzburg

Senior career*
| Years | Team | Apps | (Gls) |
| 2017 | Liefering | 2 | (0) |
| 2017–2019 | Hoffenheim II | 1 | (0) |
| 2019–2020 | Rot-Weiss Essen | 0 | (0) |
| 2020–2022 | Juniors OÖ | 62 | (3) |
| 2022– | Floridsdorfer AC | 82 | (3) |

International career
| 2014–2015 | Austria U15 | 3 | (0) |
| 2015–2016 | Austria U16 | 6 | (1) |
| 2016–2017 | Austria U17 | 8 | (0) |
| 2017 | Austria U18 | 1 | (0) |
| 2018 | Austria U19 | 5 | (0) |
- * Club domestic league appearances and goals as of 12 June 2025

Benjamin Wallquist (born 24 January 2000) is an Austrian footballer who plays as a defender for Floridsdorfer AC.

== Career ==
Wallquist joined Red Bull Salzburg from Admira Wacker in 2014. On 21 April 2017, Wallquist made his league debut for Liefering in a 3–0 loss to LASK Linz. On 2 May 2017, after two first team appearances for Liefering, Wallquist joined German side Hoffenheim. He made one appearance for the second team of Hoffenheim in the next two seasons.

On 23 July 2019, he joined German fourth-tier club Rot-Weiss Essen. After terminating his deal with Rot-Weiss in January 2020, Wallquist went on a trial at TSV Hartberg, but ended up signing with FC Juniors OÖ on 28 January 2020.
