= Jan Kronig =

Swiss football player (born 2000)

Personal information
- Date of birth: 24 June 2000 (age 26)
- Place of birth: Brig-Glis, Switzerland
- Height: 1.85 m (6 ft 1 in)
- Position: Defender

Team information
- Current team: Sion
- Number: 17

Youth career
- 2007–2011: Brig-Glis
- 2011–2019: Young Boys

Senior career*
Years	Team	Apps	(Gls)
2019–2021	Young Boys	2	(0)
2019–2020	→ Schaffhausen (loan)	30	(0)
2020–2021	→ Wil (loan)	34	(0)
2021–2024	Aarau	73	(2)
2024–	Sion	71	(2)

International career^{‡}
2015–2016	Switzerland U16	7	(0)
2016–2017	Switzerland U17	12	(0)
2017–2019	Switzerland U19	15	(0)
2018	Switzerland U18	2	(0)
2019	Switzerland U20	5	(0)
2021–2023	Switzerland U21	13	(1)
- * Club domestic league appearances and goals as of 28 September 2026 ‡ National team caps and goals as of 22 June 2023

Jan Kronig (born 24 June 2000) is a Swiss footballer who plays for Sion as a defender.

== Professional career ==
On 12 June 2018, Kronig signed his first professional contract with Young Boys. Kronig made his professional debut with Young Boys in a 6-1 Swiss Super League win over on 16 May 2019.

On 10 July 2019, Kronig was loaned out to Schaffhausen for the rest of the season.

On 21 June 2021, he signed a three-year contract with Aarau.

On 31 January 2024, Kronig moved to Sion.
