= Nathan Fuakala =

French footballer (born 2001)

Personal information
- Date of birth: 13 March 2001 (age 25)
- Place of birth: Roubaix, France
- Height: 1.84 m (6 ft 0 in)
- Position: Defender

Team information
- Current team: Rot-Weiß Erfurt
- Number: 5

Youth career
- 2006–2008: SCO Roubaix 59
- 2008–2012: ASBO Roubaix
- 2012–2014: Croix FIC
- 2014–2018: Valenciennes
- 2018–2020: Club Brugge

Senior career*
Years	Team	Apps	(Gls)
2020–2021	Club NXT	22	(0)
2021–2023	Deinze	1	(0)
2022–2023	→ Francs Borains (loan)	23	(0)
2025	Tournai	12	(0)
2025–	Rot-Weiß Erfurt	9	(0)
- * Club domestic league appearances and goals as of 22 June 2026

Nathan Fuakala (born 13 March 2001) is a French professional footballer who plays as a defender for German Regionalliga Nordost club Rot-Weiß Erfurt.

== Club career ==
Born in Roubaix, Fuakala made his debut for Club NXT, the reserve team for Club Brugge, in the Belgian First Division B on 22 August 2020 against RWDM47. He started and played the whole match as the match ended in a 0–2 defeat.

On 21 May 2021, he signed a two-year contract with Deinze, also in the Belgian second tier. On 5 September 2022, Fuakala was loaned by Francs Borains.

On 21 October 2025, Fuakala signed for German Regionalliga side Rot-Weiß Erfurt on a two-year contract.

== Personal life ==
Born in France, Fuakala is of Congolese descent.

== Career statistics ==
As of match played 16 October 2020

Appearances and goals by club, season and competition
Club	Season	League			Cup		Other		Total	
Club	Season	Division	Apps	Goals	Apps	Goals	Apps	Goals	Apps	Goals
Club NXT	2020–21	Belgian First Division B	6	0	—	—	—	—	6	0
Career total			6	0	0	0	0	0	6	0
