= Daniel Finěk =

Czech footballer (born 2000)

Personal information
- Date of birth: 25 May 2000 (age 26)
- Place of birth: Nepolisy, Czech Republic
- Height: 1.86 m (6 ft 1 in)
- Position: Right back

Team information
- Current team: Varnsdorf (on loan from Hradec Králové)
- Number: 21

Youth career
- Cidlina Nový Bydžov
- Hradec Králové

Senior career*
Years	Team	Apps	(Gls)
2018–	Hradec Králové	10	(0)
2019–	→ Varnsdorf (loan)	5	(0)

International career
2015	Czech Republic U15	2	(0)
2015	Czech Republic U16	2	(0)
2016–2017	Czech Republic U17	8	(0)
2017–2018	Czech Republic U18	14	(0)
- * Club domestic league appearances and goals as of 01:14, 13 November 2019 (UTC)

Daniel Finěk (born 25 May 2000) is a Czech professional footballer who plays as a defender for FK Varnsdorf on loan from FC Hradec Králové in the Czech National Football League.

== Club career ==
He made his league debut in Hradec's Czech National Football League 1–0 win at Táborsko on 22 July 2018.
