= Lucas de Vega =

Brazilian footballer (born 2000)

Personal information
- Full name: Lucas de Vega Lima
- Date of birth: 16 January 2000 (age 26)
- Place of birth: Fortaleza, Brazil
- Height: 1.80 m (5 ft 11 in)
- Position: Midfielder

Team information
- Current team: Botoșani
- Number: 21

Youth career
- 2009–2019: Barcelona

Senior career*
Years	Team	Apps	(Gls)
2019–2022	Barcelona B	48	(2)
2019–2020	→ Cartagena (loan)	17	(1)
2022–2023	Atlético Baleares	22	(0)
2024–2025	Panevėžys	53	(10)
2026–	Botoșani	15	(1)
- * Club domestic league appearances and goals as of 1 November 2026

Lucas de Vega Lima (born 16 January 2000) is a Brazilian professional footballer who plays as a midfielder for Liga I club Botoșani.

== Career ==
De Vega started his career at Barcelona's youth ranks.

On 17 February 2024, he moved to Lithuanian A Lyga club Panevėžys. On 10 March 2024, he made his debut in a match against Dainava. On 15 September 2024, he scored his first goal in A Lyga in a 3–2 win against FK Banga.

== Personal life ==
He moved with his parents from Brazil to Spain at the age of two. He has a sister.

== Honours ==
Panevėžys

- Lithuanian Cup: 2025
