= Denis Fayzullin =

Russian footballer

Personal information
- Full name: Denis Abudarovich Fayzullin
- Date of birth: 12 April 2001 (age 25)
- Place of birth: Ufa, Russia
- Height: 1.75 m (5 ft 9 in)
- Position: Winger

Team information
- Current team: FC Murom
- Number: 50

Youth career
- –2019: FC Spartak Moscow
- 2019: FC Lokomotiv Moscow

Senior career*
Years	Team	Apps	(Gls)
2019–2022	FC Kazanka Moscow	25	(2)
2021	→ FC Tom Tomsk (loan)	11	(0)
2021–2022	→ FC Fakel Voronezh (loan)	11	(0)
2022–2023	FC Irtysh Omsk	20	(3)
2023	FC Arsenal Tula	4	(0)
2023	FC Arsenal-2 Tula	6	(1)
2023–2025	FC Spartak Kostroma	37	(6)
2025–2026	FC Torpedo Miass	27	(5)
2026–	FC Murom	13	(0)

International career^{‡}
2018–2019	Russia U18	18	(4)
2019	Russia U19	3	(0)
- * Club domestic league appearances and goals as of 1 November 2026 ‡ National team caps and goals as of 9 September 2019

Denis Abudarovich Fayzullin (Russian: Дэнис Абударович Файзуллин; born 12 April 2001) is a Russian football player who plays for FC Murom.

== Club career ==
He made his debut in the Russian Football National League for FC Tom Tomsk on 27 February 2021 in a game against FC Alania Vladikavkaz.

On 1 June 2021, he extended his contract with FC Lokomotiv Moscow and was loaned to FC Fakel Voronezh for the 2021–22 season.
