= Marcel Zylla =

Polish footballer (born 2000)

Personal information
- Full name: Marcel Noah Zylla
- Date of birth: 14 January 2000 (age 26)
- Place of birth: Munich, Germany
- Height: 1.78 m (5 ft 10 in)
- Position: Midfielder

Team information
- Current team: Warta Poznań

Youth career
- –2010: TSV Ludwigsfeld
- 2010–2019: Bayern Munich

Senior career*
Years	Team	Apps	(Gls)
2018–2020	Bayern Munich II	14	(3)
2020–2024	Śląsk Wrocław	35	(2)
2020–2024	Śląsk Wrocław II	22	(3)
2024–2025	Wisła Puławy	18	(5)
2025	Chojniczanka Chojnice	16	(1)
2025–	Warta Poznań	25	(5)

International career
2016	Germany U17	1	(0)
2017	Poland U19	1	(0)
2018–2019	Poland U20	10	(2)
- * Club domestic league appearances and goals as of 09:21, 31 May 2026 (UTC)

Marcel Noah Zylla (born 14 January 2000) is a Polish professional footballer who plays as a midfielder for I liga club Warta Poznań.

== Career ==
Zylla made his professional debut for Bayern Munich II in the 3. Liga on 20 July 2019, starting in the away match against Würzburger Kickers. On 8 September 2020, he joined the Polish Ekstraklasa side Śląsk Wrocław, signing a four-year contract. On 2 October 2020, he made his league debut, facing Cracovia as his team won 3–1. During his stint with Śląsk, he was unable to establish himself as a first-team player, and left the club by mutual consent on 15 January 2024.

On 26 July 2024, Zylla was registered to play for II liga club Wisła Puławy. During a half-year stint, he scored five goals in 19 appearances for Wisła across all competitions.

On 10 January 2025, Zylla moved to fellow third division club Chojniczanka Chojnice on an eighteen-month contract. He was released by the club at the end of June 2025.

On 17 July 2025, Zylla joined Warta Poznań on a season-long deal with an option for another year.

== Personal life ==
Zylla was born in Munich, Bavaria to Polish emigrants in Germany.

== Career statistics ==
As of match played 17 May 2026

Appearances and goals by club, season and competition
Club	Season	League			National cup (Note: Includes Polish Cup)		Europe		Other		Total	
Club	Season	Division	Apps	Goals	Apps	Goals	Apps	Goals	Apps	Goals	Apps	Goals
Bayern Munich II	2018–19	Regionalliga Bayern	1	0	—		—		—		1	0
Bayern Munich II	2019–20	3. Liga	13	3	—		—		—		13	3
Bayern Munich II	Total		14	3	—		—		—		14	3
Śląsk Wrocław	2020–21	Ekstraklasa	20	1	0	0	—		—		20	1
Śląsk Wrocław	2021–22	Ekstraklasa	11	1	0	0	0	0	—		11	1
Śląsk Wrocław	2022–23	Ekstraklasa	2	0	0	0	—		—		2	0
Śląsk Wrocław	2023–24	Ekstraklasa	2	0	0	0	—		—		2	0
Śląsk Wrocław	Total		35	2	0	0	0	0	—		35	2
Śląsk Wrocław II	2020–21	II liga	2	0	—		—		—		2	0
Śląsk Wrocław II	2021–22	II liga	9	0	0	0	—		—		9	0
Śląsk Wrocław II	2022–23	II liga	7	0	0	0	—		—		7	0
Śląsk Wrocław II	2023–24	III liga, group III	4	3	0	0	—		—		4	3
Śląsk Wrocław II	Total		22	3	0	0	—		—		22	3
Wisła Puławy	2024–25	II liga	18	5	1	0	—		—		19	5
Chojniczanka Chojnice	2024–25	II liga	14	1	—		—		2 (Note: Appearances in II liga promotion play-offs)	0	16	1
Warta Poznań	2025–26	II liga	25	5	2	0	—		—		27	5
Career total			128	19	3	0	0	0	2	0	133	19

== Honours ==
Bayern Munich II

- Regionalliga Bayern: 2018–19
