= Romário Baró =

Footballer

Personal information
- Full name: Romário Manuel Silva Baró
- Date of birth: 25 January 2000 (age 26)
- Place of birth: Bissau, Guinea-Bissau
- Height: 1.80 m (5 ft 11 in)
- Position: Midfielder

Team information
- Current team: Radomiak Radom
- Number: 28

Youth career
- 2011–2012: Povoense
- 2012–2014: Sporting
- 2014–2019: Porto

Senior career*
Years	Team	Apps	(Gls)
2018–2021	Porto B	46	(5)
2019–2025	Porto	29	(0)
2021–2022	→ Estoril (loan)	15	(0)
2022–2023	→ Casa Pia (loan)	18	(0)
2024–2025	→ Basel (loan)	20	(1)
2025–	Radomiak Radom	25	(2)

International career
2015–2016	Portugal U16	11	(3)
2016–2017	Portugal U17	15	(0)
2018	Portugal U18	1	(0)
2018–2019	Portugal U19	10	(1)
2019–2021	Portugal U21	3	(0)
Medal record
Men's football
Representing Portugal
UEFA European U21 Championship
Runner-up	2021
- * Club domestic league appearances and goals as of 22:43, 29 May 2026 (UTC)

Romário Manuel Silva Baró (born 25 January 2000) is a professional footballer who plays as a midfielder for Ekstraklasa club Radomiak Radom. Born in Guinea-Bissau, Baró represented Portugal internationally at youth level.

== Club career ==
Born in Bissau in Guinea-Bissau, Baró played in Sporting CP's youth teams, before joining Porto in 2014. He made his professional debut for the reserves in LigaPro on 21 January 2018, playing the last three minutes of a 1–1 home draw against Arouca as a substitute for Rui Moreira. He made ten appearances over the season and scored once, to open a 3–0 win over Covilhã on 18 March, also at the Estádio Dr. Jorge Sampaio.

In the 2018–19 UEFA Youth League, Baró scored six goals in ten appearances as Porto won the title. In the final, he assisted Afonso Sousa for the last goal of a 3–1 win over Chelsea in Nyon, Switzerland. With the B-team in the second division, he scored four goals in 28 games over the season, and was sent off for dissent on 1 September 2018 in a 2–1 home win over Académico de Viseu.

Baró was given the first team's number 8 shirt ahead of the 2019–20 season, inheriting it from Yacine Brahimi. He made his debut in the UEFA Champions League third qualifying round first leg on 7 August, starting in a 1–0 win away to Krasnodar and making way for Luis Díaz on 55 minutes. Ten days later he played his first game in the Primeira Liga, again starting a 4–0 home win against Vitória.

On 1 September 2021, he joined Estoril in the Primeira Liga on loan.

== International career ==
Baró has represented Portugal at various youth levels. At the 2021 UEFA European Under-21 Championship, where Portugal finished as runners-up to Germany, he appeared in quarterfinal and semifinal games.

== Career statistics ==
As of match played 23 May 2026

Appearances and goals by club, season and competition
Club	Season	League			National cup (Note: Includes Taça de Portugal, Swiss Cup, Polish Cup)		League cup (Note: Includes Taça da Liga)		Continental		Other		Total	
Club	Season	Division	Apps	Goals	Apps	Goals	Apps	Goals	Apps	Goals	Apps	Goals	Apps	Goals
Porto B	2017–18	Liga Portugal 2	10	1	—		—		—		—		10	1
Porto B	2018–19	Liga Portugal 2	28	4	—		—		—		—		28	4
Porto B	2020–21	Liga Portugal 2	8	0	—		—		—		—		8	0
Porto B	Total		46	5	—		—		—		—		46	5
Porto	2019–20	Primeira Liga	9	0	4	0	3	0	2 (Note: One appearance in UEFA Champions League, one appearance in UEFA Europa League)	0	—		18	0
Porto	2020–21	Primeira Liga	10	0	2	0	0	0	3 (Note: Appearance(s) in UEFA Champions League)	0	1 (Note: Appearance in Supertaça Cândido de Oliveira)	0	16	0
Porto	2023–24	Primeira Liga	10	0	4	0	1	0	1	0	1	0	17	0
Porto	Total		29	0	10	0	4	0	6	0	2	0	51	0
Estoril (loan)	2021–22	Primeira Liga	15	0	2	0	0	0	—		—		17	0
Casa Pia (loan)	2022–23	Primeira Liga	18	0	3	0	3	0	—		—		24	0
Basel (loan)	2024–25	Swiss Super League	20	1	4	0	—		—		—		24	1
Radomiak Radom	2025–26	Ekstraklasa	25	2	1	0	—		—		26	2		
Career total			153	8	20	0	7	0	6	0	2	0	188	8

== Honours ==
Porto Youth

- UEFA Youth League: 2018–19

Porto

- Primeira Liga: 2019–20
- Taça de Portugal: 2019–20, 2023–24
- Supertaça Cândido de Oliveira: 2020

Basel

- Swiss Super League: 2024–25
- Swiss Cup: 2024–25
