= Levi Faustino =

Portuguese footballer

Personal information
- Full name: Levi Samuel Júlio Faustino
- Date of birth: 31 August 2001 (age 25)
- Place of birth: Aveiro, Portugal
- Height: 1.80 m (5 ft 11 in)
- Position: Defender

Team information
- Current team: Porto B
- Number: 84

Youth career
- 2009–2021: Porto
- 2016–2017: → Padroense (loan)

Senior career*
Years	Team	Apps	(Gls)
2021–	Porto B	26	(0)

International career^{‡}
2016	Portugal U15	2	(0)
2016–2017	Portugal U16	8	(1)
2017–2018	Portugal U17	12	(0)
2018–2019	Portugal U18	8	(0)
2019	Portugal U19	10	(0)
Medal record
Men's football
Representing Portugal
UEFA European U19 Championship
Runner-up	2019
- * Club domestic league appearances and goals as of 26 June 2023 ‡ National team caps and goals as of 10 August 2021

Levi Samuel Júlio Faustino (born 31 August 2001) is a Portuguese professional footballer who plays as a defender for Porto B.

== International career ==
Faustino has represented Portugal at youth international level.

== Career statistics ==
=== Club ===
As of 30 August 2021

Club	Season	League			National Cup		League Cup		Other		Total	
Club	Season	Division	Apps	Goals	Apps	Goals	Apps	Goals	Apps	Goals	Apps	Goals
Porto B	2021–22	Liga Portugal 2	1	0	–		–		0	0	1	0
Career total			1	0	0	0	0	0	0	0	1	0
