= Rodrigo Farofa =

Brazilian footballer

Personal information
- Full name: Rodrigo Antônio Rodrigues
- Date of birth: 21 April 2000 (age 26)
- Place of birth: São Carlos, Brazil
- Height: 1.74 m (5 ft 8 1/2 in)
- Position: Forward

Team information
- Current team: Cuiabá (on loan from Mirassol)
- Number: 27

Youth career
- 2013–2015: Multi Esporte
- 2015–2018: Novorizontino
- 2017: → Palmeiras (loan)
- 2018–2019: Real Madrid

Senior career*
Years	Team	Apps	(Gls)
2017–2018	Novorizontino	3	(0)
2019–2023	Real Madrid B	6	(0)
2020–2022	→ Talavera (loan)	45	(11)
2022–2023	→ Valencia B (loan)	20	(3)
2023–2024	Valencia B	21	(3)
2024–2025	Operário Ferroviário	78	(9)
2026–	Mirassol	3	(0)
2026–	→ Cuiabá (loan)	28	(0)
- * Club domestic league appearances and goals as of 18 November 2026

Rodrigo Antônio Rodrigues (born 21 April 2000), known as Rodrigo Farofa or just Rodrigo, is a Brazilian professional footballer who plays for Cuiabá, on loan from Mirassol. Mainly a forward, he can also play as an attacking midfielder.

== Club career ==
=== Novorizontino ===
Born in São Carlos, São Paulo, Rodrigo Farofa is a Grêmio Novorizontino youth graduate. He joined the club in 2015 and was promoted to the under-20 squad ahead of the 2017 season, and impressed during the year's Copa São Paulo de Futebol Júnior. On 25 January of that year, he was promoted to the main squad.

On 29 March 2017, Rodrigo Farofa made his professional debut starting and providing the assist for Henrique's goal in a 3–1 away loss against Santos.

In August 2017, Rodrigo Farofa joined Palmeiras on loan and played at the La Comunidad de Madrid under-17 tournament, scoring five goals in four matches.

=== Real Madrid ===
On 13 September 2017, Spanish newspaper Marca announced that Real Madrid had reached an agreement for Rodrigo Farofa. On 30 May 2018, he signed a six-year contract with Real Madrid and joined the U19 team.

Rodrigo Farofa made his debut for Castilla on 13 January 2019, starting in a 0–0 Segunda División B away draw against UD Las Palmas Atlético.

On 24 September 2020, Rodrigo Farofa joined Segunda División B side Talavera on a season-long loan deal.

== Career statistics ==
As of 17 December 2022

Club	Season	League			State League		National Cup		Continental		Other		Total	
Club	Season	Division	Apps	Goals	Apps	Goals	Apps	Goals	Apps	Goals	Apps	Goals	Apps	Goals
Novorizontino	2017	Paulista	—		2	0	—		—		—		2	0
Novorizontino	2018	Paulista	—		1	0	—		—		—		1	0
Novorizontino	Total		—		3	0	—		—		—		3	0
Real Madrid Castilla	2018–19	Segunda División B	2	0	—		—		—		—		2	0
Real Madrid Castilla	2019–20	Segunda División B	4	0	—		—		—		—		4	0
Real Madrid Castilla	Total		6	0	—		—		—		—		6	0
Talavera	2020–21	Segunda División B	19	3	—		0	0	—		0	0	19	3
Talavera	2021–22	Primera División RFEF	30	8	—		2	1	—		0	0	32	9
Talavera	Total		49	11	—		2	1	—		0	0	51	12
Valencia Mestalla	2022–23	Segunda División RFEF	12	3	—		—		—		0	0	12	3
Career total			67	14	3	0	2	1	0	0	0	0	72	15

== Honours ==
=== Club ===
Operário Ferroviário

- Campeonato Paranaense: 2025
