= Ludovico D'Orazio =

Italian footballer (born 2000)

Personal information
- Date of birth: 19 February 2000 (age 26)
- Place of birth: Sora, Lazio, Italy
- Height: 1.75 m (5 ft 9 in)
- Position: Forward

Team information
- Current team: Cerignola
- Number: 10

Youth career
- –2012: Frosinone
- 2012–2020: Roma

Senior career*
Years	Team	Apps	(Gls)
2018–2021	Roma	0	(0)
2020–2021	→ Feralpisalò (loan)	40	(6)
2021–2025	SPAL	49	(3)
2022–2023	→ Feralpisalò (loan)	18	(1)
2023	→ Mantova (loan)	11	(0)
2023–2024	→ Novara (loan)	18	(4)
2024	→ Latina (loan)	10	(1)
2025–	Cerignola	38	(7)

International career^{‡}
2015	Italy U15	4	(0)
2015–2016	Italy U16	4	(0)
- * Club domestic league appearances and goals as of 1 May 2026 ‡ National team caps and goals as of 21 February 2016

Ludovico D'Orazio (born 19 February 2000) is an Italian professional footballer who plays as a forward for Serie C Group C club Cerignola.

== Club career ==
D'Orazio is a product of Roma youth teams and started playing for their Under-19 squad in the 2017–18 season.

D'Orazio made his first appearance for Roma's senior squad on 6 September 2018 in a friendly against Benevento.

D'Orazio made his professional Serie C debut for Feralpisalò on 27 September 2020 in a game against Arezzo.

On 30 July 2021, D'Orazio signed a three-year contract with Serie B club SPAL. He made his Serie B debut for SPAL on 22 August 2021 against Pisa.

On 19 August 2022, D'Orazio returned to Feralpisalò on loan. On 30 January 2023, he moved on a new loan to Mantova. On 1 September 2023, D'Orazio was loaned by Novara.

== International career ==
D'Orazio was first called up to represent his country in 2015 for under-15 friendlies.
