= Pedro Ruiz (footballer, born 2000) =

Spanish footballer

Personal information
- Full name: Pedro Ruiz Delgado
- Date of birth: 30 March 2000 (age 26)
- Place of birth: Sevilla, Spain
- Height: 1.97 m (6 ft 6 in)
- Position: Forward

Team information
- Current team: Marseille II

Youth career
- 2005–2008: JD Valencina
- 2008–2015: Real Betis
- 2015–2021: Real Madrid

Senior career*
Years	Team	Apps	(Gls)
2019–2021	Real Madrid Castilla	22	(4)
2021–	Marseille II	0	(0)
2021–2022	→ NEC (loan)	3	(0)

International career
2017–2018	Spain U17	2	(0)
2018–2019	Spain U19	6	(0)
- * Club domestic league appearances and goals

Pedro Ruiz Delgado (born 30 March 2000) is a Spanish footballer who plays as a forward for French club Marseille II.

== Career ==
=== Club career ===
Ruiz began his career with the youth teams of JD Valencina, Real Betis and Real Madrid, before making his professional debut for Spanish third division side Real Madrid Castilla in 2019. In 2021, he signed for Ligue 1 side Marseille, but was sent on a two-season loan to Dutch club NEC Nijmegen. On 17 October 2021, he made his for NEC during a home 1-0 defeat to local rivals Vitesse. He missed most of the rest of the 2021–22 season with knee injury and a subsequent surgery.

=== International career ===
He represented Spain internationally at the 2017 FIFA U-17 World Cup, appearing in two matches.
