= Alessio Riccardi =

Italian footballer (born 2001)

Personal information
- Date of birth: 3 April 2001 (age 25)
- Place of birth: Rome, Italy
- Height: 1.78 m (5 ft 10 in)
- Position: Midfielder

Team information
- Current team: Latina
- Number: 10

Youth career
- 2017–2022: Roma

Senior career*
Years	Team	Apps	(Gls)
2019–2022	Roma	0	(0)
2020–2021	→ Pescara (loan)	8	(0)
2022–	Latina	138	(9)

International career^{‡}
2015-2016	Italy U15	6	(2)
2016–2017	Italy U16	11	(4)
2017–2018	Italy U17	14	(4)
2018–2020	Italy U19	21	(8)
2021	Italy U20	5	(1)
Medal record
Representing Italy
UEFA European Under-17 Championship
Runner-up	England 2018	U-17 Team
- * Club domestic league appearances and goals as of 1 May 2026 ‡ National team caps and goals as of 15 November 2021

Alessio Riccardi (born 3 April 2001) is an Italian professional footballer who plays as a midfielder for Serie C Group B club Latina.

== Club career ==
A product of Roma youth academy, since 2017 he plays for the U19 Primavera team.

He made his debut for Roma's first team on 14 January 2019, aged 17, replacing Lorenzo Pellegrini in the second half of the Coppa Italia match won 4–0 at the Stadio Olimpico against Virtus Entella.

On 8 September 2020, Riccardi joined Serie B side Pescara on loan until 30 June 2021.

On 31 August 2022, after one year as a fringe player at Roma, he has been sold to Latina.

== International career ==
With the Italy U17 he took part in the 2018 UEFA European Under-17 Championship, scoring two goals and reaching the final of the tournament.

== Honours ==
Italy U17

- UEFA European Under-17 Championship runner-up: 2018

Individual

- UEFA European Under-17 Championship Team of the Tournament: 2018
