= Alberto Fernández (footballer, born 1999) =

Spanish footballer

Personal information
- Full name: Alberto Fernández García
- Date of birth: 9 July 1999 (age 27)
- Place of birth: Moratalla, Spain
- Height: 1.66 m (5 ft 5 in)
- Position: Attacking midfielder

Team information
- Current team: Akritas Chlorakas
- Number: 14

Youth career
- 2009–2011: Caravaca
- 2011–2012: La Unión
- 2012–2013: Almería
- 2013–2018: Real Madrid

Senior career*
Years	Team	Apps	(Gls)
2018–2020	Real Madrid B	31	(3)
2019–2020	→ Fuenlabrada (loan)	6	(0)
2020–2022	UCAM Murcia	52	(6)
2022–2023	Sabadell	28	(4)
2023–2024	Rayo Majadahonda	32	(0)
2024–2025	Omonia 29M	26	(1)
2025–	Akritas Chlorakas	28	(1)

International career
2017	Spain U19	1	(0)
- * Club domestic league appearances and goals as of 14 June 2026

Alberto Fernández García (born 9 July 1999) is a Spanish professional footballer for Cypriot First Division club Akritas Chlorakas. Mainly an attacking midfielder, who can also play as a winger.

== Club career ==
Born in Moratalla, Region of Murcia, Alberto joined Real Madrid's La Fábrica in 2013, from UD Almería. Promoted to the reserves ahead of the 2018–19 season, he made his senior debut on 26 August 2018 by playing the last 21 minutes in a 2–0 Segunda División B home defeat of UD Las Palmas Atlético.

Alberto scored his first senior goals on 17 February 2019, netting a brace in a 3–2 away win against CDA Navalcarnero. He finished the season with three goals in 31 appearances, but suffered a knee injury in May, eventually missing the promotion play-offs.

On 14 August 2019, despite being injured, Alberto was loaned to Segunda División newcomers CF Fuenlabrada, for one year. He made his professional debut on 2 February of the following year, coming on as a late substitute for Caye Quintana in a 0–1 home loss against Girona FC.

On 7 September 2020, he was loaned to UCAM Murcia for the 2020–21 season.
