= 2018–19 in English football =

Football in England
- Season: 2018–19

Men's football
- Premier League: Manchester City
- Championship: Norwich City
- League One: Luton Town
- League Two: Lincoln City
- National League: Leyton Orient
- FA Cup: Manchester City
- EFL Trophy: Portsmouth
- EFL Cup: Manchester City
- Community Shield: Manchester City

Women's football
- FA Women's Super League: Arsenal
- FA Women's Championship: Manchester United
- FA Women's National League: Blackburn Rovers
- Women's FA Cup: Manchester City
- FA Women's League Cup: Manchester City

The 2018–19 season was the 139th season of competitive association football in England.

== National teams ==
=== England national football team ===
==== Kits ====
Home	Away	Home alt.

==== Results and fixtures ====
===== Friendlies =====
11 September 2018	England	1–0	Switzerland	Leicester, England
20:00 BST	Rashford 54'; Henderson (yellow card) 88'	Report	Lichtsteiner (yellow card) 27'	Stadium: King Power Stadium; Attendance: 30,256; Referee: Clément Turpin (France)

15 November 2018	England	3–0	United States	London, England
20:00 GMT	Lingard 25'; Alexander-Arnold 27'; Wilson 77'	Report		Stadium: Wembley Stadium; Attendance: 68,155; Referee: Jesús Gil Manzano (Spain)

===== 2018–19 UEFA Nations League A =====
====== Group 4 ======
Pos	Team	Pld	W	D	L	GF	GA	GD	Pts	Qualification (Note: Due to revamp of the format for the 2020–21 UEFA Nations League, no teams were eventually relegated.)	(England)	(Spain)	(Croatia)
1	England	4	2	1	1	6	5	+1	7	Qualification for Nations League Finals	—	1–2	2–1
2	Spain	4	2	0	2	12	7	+5	6		2–3	—	6–0
3	Croatia	4	1	1	2	4	10	−6	4		0–0	3–2	—

Source: UEFA
Rules for classification: Tiebreakers
Notes:

8 September 2018 2018–19 UEFA Nations League A	England	1–2	Spain	London, England
19:45 UTC+1	Rashford 11'; Henderson (yellow card) 18'; Shaw (yellow card) 41'; Stones (yellow card) 66'; Rose (yellow card) 90+4'	Report	Saúl 13'; Rodrigo 32'; Carvajal (yellow card) 83'	Stadium: Wembley Stadium; Attendance: 81,392; Referee: Danny Makkelie (Netherlands)

12 October 2018 2018–19 UEFA Nations League A	Croatia	0–0	England	Rijeka, Croatia
20:45 UTC+2	Kovačić (yellow card) 25'; Lovren (yellow card) 45'; Jedvaj (yellow card) 59'	Report	Henderson (yellow card) 6'; Stones (yellow card) 52'; Sterling (yellow card) 72'	Stadium: Stadion Rujevica; Attendance: 0 Referee: Felix Brych (Germany)

15 October 2018 2018–19 UEFA Nations League A	Spain	2–3	England	Seville, Spain
20:45 UTC+2	Alcácer 58'; Ramos (yellow card) 65' (goal) 90+8'; Castro (yellow card) 75'; Ceballos (yellow card) 87'; Morata (yellow card) 90+8'	Report	Dier (yellow card) 12'; Sterling 16', 38'; Rashford 30'; Winks (yellow card) 65'; Maguire (yellow card) 71'	Stadium: Benito Villamarín; Attendance: 50,355; Referee: Szymon Marciniak (Poland)

18 November 2018 2018–19 UEFA Nations League A	England	2–1	Croatia	London, England
14:00 UTC±0	Barkley (yellow card) 26'; Lingard 78'; Kane 85'	Report	Kramarić 57'; Brozovic (yellow card) 67'; Jedvaj (yellow card) 67'; Lovren (yellow card) 89'	Stadium: Wembley Stadium; Attendance: 78,221; Referee: Anastasios Sidiropoulos (Greece)

====== 2019 UEFA Nations League Finals ======
6 June 2019 2019 UEFA Nations League SF	Netherlands	3–1 (a.e.t.)	England	Guimarães, Portugal
19:45 (UTC+1)	De Ligt (yellow card) 30', (goal) 73'; Dumfries (yellow card) 45'; Walker 97' (o.g.); Van de Beek (yellow card) 106'; Promes 114'	Report	Rashford 32' (pen.); Kane (yellow card) 70'	Stadium: Estádio D. Afonso Henriques; Attendance: 25,711; Referee: Clément Turpin (France)

9 June 2019 2019 UEFA Nations League 3rd	Switzerland	0–0 (a.e.t.) (5–6 p)	England	Guimarães, Portugal
14:00 (UTC+1)	Xhaka (yellow card) 116'	Report	Rose (yellow card) 23'; Lingard (yellow card) 27'	Stadium: Estádio D. Afonso Henriques; Attendance: 15,742; Referee: Ovidiu Hațegan (Romania)
	Penalties
	Zuber (penalty scored); Xhaka (penalty scored); Akanji (penalty scored); Mbabu (penalty scored); Schär (penalty scored); Drmić (penalty missed)		(penalty scored) Maguire; (penalty scored) Barkley; (penalty scored) Sancho; (penalty scored) Sterling; (penalty scored) Pickford; (penalty scored) Dier

===== UEFA Euro 2020 qualifying =====
====== Group A ======
Pos	Team	Pld	W	D	L	GF	GA	GD	Pts	Qualification	(England)	(Czech Republic)	(Kosovo)	(Bulgaria)	(Montenegro)
1	England	8	7	0	1	37	6	+31	21	Qualify for final tournament	—	5–0	5–3	4–0	7–0
2	Czech Republic	8	5	0	3	13	11	+2	15	Qualify for final tournament	2–1	—	2–1	2–1	3–0
3	Kosovo	8	3	2	3	13	16	−3	11	Advance to play-offs via Nations League	0–4	2–1	—	1–1	2–0
4	Bulgaria	8	1	3	4	6	17	−11	6	Advance to play-offs via Nations League	0–6	1–0	2–3	—	1–1
5	Montenegro	8	0	3	5	3	22	−19	3		1–5	0–3	1–1	0–0	—

Source: UEFA
Rules for classification: Qualification tiebreakers

22 March 2019	England	5–0	Czech Republic	London, England
20:45 (19:45 UTC+0)	Sterling 24', 62', 68'; Kane 45+2' (pen.); Kalas 84' (o.g.)	Report	Kadeřábek (yellow card) 45+1'; Schick (yellow card) 53'	Stadium: Wembley Stadium; Attendance: 82,575; Referee: Artur Soares Dias (Portugal)

25 March 2019	Montenegro	1–5	England	Podgorica, Montenegro
20:45 (19:45 UTC+0)	Vešović 18'; Boljević (yellow card) 90+2'	Report	Keane 30'; Barkley 39', 59', (yellow card) 52'; Kane 71'; Sterling 81'; Henderson (yellow card) 90+2'; Rose (yellow card) 90+3'	Stadium: Podgorica City Stadium; Attendance: 8,329; Referee: Aleksei Kulbakov (Belarus)

=== England U-21 national football team ===
==== 2019 UEFA European Under-21 Championship qualification ====
===== Group 4 =====
Pos	Team	Pld	W	D	L	GF	GA	GD	Pts	Qualification	England	Netherlands	Ukraine	Scotland	Latvia	Andorra
1	England	10	8	2	0	23	4	+19	26	Final tournament	—	0–0	2–1	3–1	3–0	7–0
2	Netherlands	10	5	3	2	21	6	+15	18		1–1	—	3–0	1–2	3–0	8–0
3	Ukraine	10	5	2	3	18	12	+6	17		0–2	1–1	—	3–1	3–2	1–0
4	Scotland	10	4	2	4	13	13	0	14		0–2	2–0	0–2	—	1–1	3–0
5	Latvia	10	0	4	6	5	18	−13	4		1–2	0–3	1–1	0–2	—	0–0
6	Andorra	10	0	3	7	1	28	−27	3		0–1	0–1	0–6	1–1	0–0	—

Source: UEFA
Rules for classification: Qualification tiebreakers

==== 2019 UEFA European Under-21 Championship ====
The final draw was held on 23 November 2018, 18:00 CET (UTC+1), in Bologna. The 12 teams are drawn into three groups of four teams. Hosts Italy are assigned to position A1 in the draw, while the other teams are seeded according to their coefficient ranking following the end of the qualifying stage, calculated based on the following:

=== England U-19 national football team ===
==== 2018 UEFA European Under-19 Championship ====
===== Group B =====
Pos	Team	Pld	W	D	L	GF	GA	GD	Pts	Qualification
1	Ukraine	3	2	1	0	4	2	+2	7	Knockout stage and 2019 FIFA U-20 World Cup
2	France	3	2	0	1	11	2	+9	6	Knockout stage and 2019 FIFA U-20 World Cup
3	England	3	1	1	1	4	8	−4	4	FIFA U-20 World Cup play-off
4	Turkey	3	0	0	3	2	9	−7	0	

Source: UEFA
Rules for classification: Group stage tiebreakers

===== Knockout stage =====
26 July 2018	Norway	3–0	England	Seinäjoki, Finland
13:00	Botheim 75'; Markovic 86'; Hauge 89'	Report		Stadium: OmaSP Stadion; Referee: Bartosz Frankowski (Poland)

=== England U-17 national football team ===
==== 2019 UEFA European Under-17 Championship ====
===== Group B =====
Pos	Team	Pld	W	D	L	GF	GA	GD	Pts	Qualification
1	France	3	2	1	0	7	3	+4	7	Knockout stage
2	Netherlands	3	2	0	1	7	4	+3	6	Knockout stage
3	England	3	1	1	1	6	7	−1	4	
4	Sweden	3	0	0	3	3	9	−6	0	

Source: UEFA
Rules for classification: Group stage tiebreakers

3 May 2019	England	1–1	France	Longford, Ireland
19:30	Greenwood 34' (pen.)	Report	Aouchiche 79'	Stadium: City Calling Stadium; Referee: Rade Obrenović (Slovenia)

6 May 2019	Netherlands	5–2	England	Dublin, Ireland
15:00	Brobbey 10', 58' (pen.); Bannis 35'; Hansen 45+1'; Ünüvar 61'	Report	Harwood-Bellis 7'; Greenwood 34' (pen.)	Stadium: Tolka Park; Referee: Manfredas Lukjančukas (Lithuania)

9 May 2019	Sweden	1–3	England	Dublin, Ireland
16:30	Prica 28'	Report	Greenwood 15'; Jenks 76'; Gelhardt 82'	Stadium: Whitehall Stadium; Referee: Espen Eskås (Norway)

=== England women's national football team ===
==== Results and fixtures ====
===== Friendlies =====
6 October 2018	England	1–0	Brazil	Nottingham, England
12:30 BST	Kirby 2'	Report		Stadium: Meadow Lane; Attendance: 7,864; Referee: Sandra Braz Bastos (Portugal)

9 October 2018	England	1–1	Australia	London, England
19:00 BST	Kirby 21'	Report	Polkinghorne 84'	Stadium: Craven Cottage; Referee: Florence Guillemin (France)

8 November 2018	Austria	0–3	England	Maria Enzersdorf, Austria
19:00 CET		Report	Ubogagu 26'; Stanway 72'; Daly 81'	Stadium: BSFZ-Arena

11 November 2018	England	0–2	Sweden	Rotherham, England
13:30 GMT		Report	Jakobsson 20'; Anvegård 33'	Stadium: New York Stadium; Attendance: 9,561; Referee: Petra Pavlikova (Slovakia)

5 April 2019	England	0–1	Canada	Manchester, England
19:00 BST		Report	Chapman (yellow card) 34'; Sinclair 81'	Stadium: Academy Stadium; Attendance: 5,682; Referee: Ivana Martincic (Croatia)

9 April 2019	England	2–1	Spain	Swindon, England
19:00 BST	Scott (yellow card) 19'; Mead 36'; White 46'	Report	León (yellow card) 20'; Bonmatí 67'	Stadium: Energy Check County Ground; Attendance: 13,449; Referee: Stephanie Frappart (France)

25 May 2019	England	2–0	Denmark	Walsall, England
15:00 BST	Parris 45+1'; Scott 59'	Report		Stadium: Bank's Stadium; Attendance: 8,273; Referee: Desiree Grundbacher (Switzerland)

1 June 2019	England	0–1	New Zealand	Brighton and Hove, England
15:00 BST		Report	Gregorius 50'; Riley (yellow card) 56'	Stadium: Amex Stadium; Attendance: 20,076; Referee: Monika Mularczyk (Poland)

===== 2019 FIFA Women's World Cup qualification (UEFA) =====
====== UEFA Group 1 ======
Pos	Team	Pld	W	D	L	GF	GA	GD	Pts	Qualification	England	Wales	Russia	Bosnia and Herzegovina	Kazakhstan
1	England	8	7	1	0	29	1	+28	22	2019 FIFA Women's World Cup	—	0–0	6–0	4–0	5–0
2	Wales	8	5	2	1	7	3	+4	17		0–3	—	3–0	1–0	1–0
3	Russia	8	4	1	3	16	13	+3	13		1–3	0–0	—	3–0	3–0
4	Bosnia and Herzegovina	8	1	0	7	3	19	−16	3 (Note: Head-to-head results: Kazakhstan 0–2 Bosnia and Herzegovina, Bosnia and Herzegovina 0–2 Kazakhstan (tied on head-to-head results, ranked on total goal difference).)		0–2	0–1	1–6	—	0–2
5	Kazakhstan	8	1	0	7	2	21	−19	3		0–6	0–1	0–3	0–2	—

Source: UEFA
Notes:

31 August 2018 WCQ-G1	Wales	0–3	England	Newport, Wales
20:45 (19:45 BST)		Report	Duggan 57'; Scott 60'; Parris 69'	Stadium: Rodney Parade; Attendance: 5,053; Referee: Katalin Kulcsár (Hungary)

4 September 2018 WCQ-G1	Kazakhstan	0–6	England	Pavlodar, Kazakhstan
17:00 (21:00 ALMT)		Report	Mead 9' (pen.), 82'; Daly 35'; Christiansen 54'; Staniforth 66'; Bronze 87'	Stadium: Pavlodar Central Stadium; Attendance: 6,842; Referee: Hristiana Guteva (Bulgaria)

===== 2019 SheBelieves Cup =====
Pos	Team	Pld	W	D	L	GF	GA	GD	Pts
1	England (C)	3	2	1	0	7	3	+4	7
2	United States (H)	3	1	2	0	5	4	+1	5
3	Japan	3	1	1	1	5	6	−1	4
4	Brazil	3	0	0	3	2	6	−4	0

Source: USSoccer
Rules for classification: 1) points; 2) goal difference; 3) goals scored; 4) head-to-head result; 5) FIFA ranking.
(C) Champions; (H) Hosts

27 February 2019	England	2–1	Brazil	Chester, Pennsylvania
16:00 ET	White 49'; Mead 75'	Report	Andressa Alves 16' (pen.)	Stadium: Talen Energy Stadium; Attendance: 5,954; Referee: Ekaterina Koroleva (United States)

2 March 2019	United States	2–2	England	Nashville, Tennessee
16:30 ET	Rapinoe 32'; Heath 66'	Report	Houghton 35'; Parris 52'	Stadium: Nissan Stadium; Attendance: 22,125; Referee: Marianela Araya (Costa Rica)

5 March 2019	Japan	0–3	England	Tampa, Florida
17:15 ET		Report	Staniforth 12'; Carney 23'; Mead 30'	Stadium: Raymond James Stadium; Attendance: 8,580; Referee: Christina Unkel (United States)

===== 2019 FIFA Women's World Cup =====
====== Group D ======
Pos	Team	Pld	W	D	L	GF	GA	GD	Pts	Qualification
1	England	3	3	0	0	5	1	+4	9	Advance to knockout stage
2	Japan	3	1	1	1	2	3	−1	4	Advance to knockout stage
3	Argentina	3	0	2	1	3	4	−1	2	
4	Scotland	3	0	1	2	5	7	−2	1	

Source: FIFA
Rules for classification: Group stage tiebreakers

9 June 2019 Group D	England	2–1	Scotland	Nice, France
18:00	Parris 14' (pen.); White 40'	Report	Emslie 79'	Stadium: Allianz Riviera; Attendance: 13,188; Referee: Jana Adámková (Czech Republic)

14 June 2019 Group D	England	1–0	Argentina	Le Havre, France
21:00	Taylor 62'	Report		Stadium: Stade Océane; Attendance: 20,294; Referee: Qin Liang (China PR)

19 June 2019 Group D	Japan	0–2	England	Nice, France
21:00		Report	White 14', 84'	Stadium: Allianz Riviera; Attendance: 14,319; Referee: Claudia Umpiérrez (Uruguay)

====== Knockout stage ======
23 June 2019 Round of 16	England	3–0	Cameroon	Valenciennes, France
17:30	Houghton 14'; White 45+4'; Greenwood 58'	Report		Stadium: Stade du Hainaut; Attendance: 20,148; Referee: Qin Liang (China PR)

27 June 2019 Quarter-finals	Norway	0–3	England	Le Havre, France
21:00		Report	Scott 3'; White 40'; Bronze 57'	Stadium: Stade Océane; Attendance: 21,111; Referee: Lucila Venegas (Mexico)

2 July 2019 Semi-finals	England	1–2	United States	Décines-Charpieu, France
21:00	White 19'	Report	Press 10'; Morgan 31'	Stadium: Parc Olympique Lyonnais; Attendance: 53,512; Referee: Edina Alves Batista (Brazil)

6 July 2019 3rd place	England	1–2	Sweden	Nice, France
17:00	Kirby 31'	Report	Asllani 11'; Jakobsson 22'	Stadium: Allianz Riviera; Attendance: 20,316; Referee: Anastasia Pustovoitova (Russia)

=== England women's national under-20 football team ===
==== 2018 FIFA U-20 Women's World Cup ====
===== Group B =====
The official draw was held on 8 March 2018 at the Rennes Opera House in Rennes.

Pos	Team	Pld	W	D	L	GF	GA	GD	Pts	Qualification
1	England	3	2	1	0	10	3	+7	7	Knockout stage
2	North Korea	3	2	0	1	5	5	0	6	Knockout stage
3	Mexico	3	1	0	2	5	10	−5	3	
4	Brazil	3	0	1	2	4	6	−2	1	

Source: FIFA
Rules for classification: Group stage tiebreakers

5 August 2018 Group B	North Korea	1–3	England	Dinan-Léhon, France
16:30	Ja Un-Yong 71'	Report	Russo 31', 73'; Stanway 60'	Stadium: Stade du Clos Gastel; Attendance: 1,464; Referee: Stéphanie Frappart (France)

8 August 2018 Group B	Brazil	1–1	England	Dinan-Léhon, France
13:30	Ariadina 90+2'	Report	Stanway 11' (pen.)	Stadium: Stade du Clos Gastel; Attendance: 1,981; Referee: Melissa Borjas (Honduras)

12 August 2018 Group B	England	6–1	Mexico	Saint-Malo, France
13:30	Russo 49'; Kelly 53'; Hemp 62', 68', 80'; Stanway 64'	Report	Ovalle 37'	Stadium: Stade Marville; Attendance: 1,362; Referee: Kate Jacewicz (Australia)

===== Knockout stage =====
17 August 2018 QF	England	2–1	Netherlands	Vannes, France
16:00	Stanway 20', 23'	Report	Pelova 12'	Stadium: Stade de la Rabine; Attendance: 2,737; Referee: Ri Hyang-ok (North Korea)

20 August 2018 SF	England	0–2	Japan	Vannes, France
16:00		Report	Ueki 22' Endo 27'	Stadium: Stade de la Rabine; Attendance: 2,807; Referee: Claudia Umpiérrez (Uruguay)

24 August 2018 3rd	France	1–1 (2–4 p)	England	Vannes, France
16:00	Laurent 68' (pen.)	Report	Stanway 46'	Stadium: Stade de la Rabine; Attendance: 4,706; Referee: Gladys Lengwe (Zambia)
	Penalties
	Thibaud (penalty scored); Bacha (penalty missed); Laurent (penalty scored); Delabre (penalty missed)		(penalty scored) Stanway; (penalty scored) Hemp; (penalty missed) Russo; (penalty scored) Peplow; (penalty scored) Allen

=== England women's national under-17 football team ===
==== 2019 UEFA Women's Under-17 Championship qualification ====
===== Group 5 =====
Pos	Team	Pld	W	D	L	GF	GA	GD	Pts	Qualification
1	England	3	3	0	0	15	0	+15	9	Elite round
2	Iceland	3	2	0	1	7	2	+5	6	Elite round
3	Azerbaijan	3	0	1	2	1	9	−8	1	
4	Moldova (H)	3	0	1	2	1	13	−12	1	

Source: UEFA
Rules for classification: Qualification tiebreakers
(H) Hosts

19 September 2018	England	6–0	Moldova	Chișinău, Moldova
14:00 (15:00 EEST)	Filis 38' (pen.), 88', 90+5' (pen.); Stables 65'; Robinson 73'; Grant 90+1'	Report		Stadium: Zimbru Stadium; Referee: Merima Čelik (Bosnia and Herzegovina)

22 September 2018	England	7–0	Azerbaijan	Vadul lui Vodă, Moldova
14:00 (15:00 EEST)	Robinson 19', 28'; Goodwin 35', 73'; Grant 66'; Safaraliyeva 81' (o.g.); Hack 90+2'	Report		Stadium: Stadionul CPSM; Referee: Catarina Campos (Portugal)

25 September 2018	Iceland	0–2	England	Orhei, Moldova
14:00 (15:00 EEST)		Report	Filis 65'; Stables 87'	Stadium: CSR Orhei; Referee: Catarina Campos (Portugal)

== UEFA competitions ==
=== UEFA Champions League ===
==== Group stage ====
===== Group B =====
Pos	Team	Pld	W	D	L	GF	GA	GD	Pts	Qualification	BAR	TOT	INT	PSV
1	(Spain) Barcelona	6	4	2	0	14	5	+9	14	Advance to knockout phase	—	1–1	2–0	4–0
2	(England) Tottenham Hotspur	6	2	2	2	9	10	−1	8 (Note: Head-to-head away goals: Tottenham Hotspur 1, Inter Milan 0.)	Advance to knockout phase	2–4	—	1–0	2–1
3	(Italy) Inter Milan	6	2	2	2	6	7	−1	8	Transfer to Europa League	1–1	2–1	—	1–1
4	(Netherlands) PSV Eindhoven	6	0	2	4	6	13	−7	2		1–2	2–2	1–2	—

Source: UEFA

===== Group C =====
Pos	Team	Pld	W	D	L	GF	GA	GD	Pts	Qualification	PAR	LIV	NAP	RSB
1	(France) Paris Saint-Germain	6	3	2	1	17	9	+8	11	Advance to knockout phase	—	2–1	2–2	6–1
2	(England) Liverpool	6	3	0	3	9	7	+2	9 (Note: Goals in all group matches: Liverpool 9, Napoli 7.)	Advance to knockout phase	3–2	—	1–0	4–0
3	(Italy) Napoli	6	2	3	1	7	5	+2	9	Transfer to Europa League	1–1	1–0	—	3–1
4	(Serbia) Red Star Belgrade	6	1	1	4	5	17	−12	4		1–4	2–0	0–0	—

Source: UEFA

===== Group F =====
Pos	Team	Pld	W	D	L	GF	GA	GD	Pts	Qualification	MCI	LYO	SHK	HOF
1	(England) Manchester City	6	4	1	1	16	6	+10	13	Advance to knockout phase	—	1–2	6–0	2–1
2	(France) Lyon	6	1	5	0	12	11	+1	8	Advance to knockout phase	2–2	—	2–2	2–2
3	(Ukraine) Shakhtar Donetsk	6	1	3	2	8	16	−8	6	Transfer to Europa League	0–3	1–1	—	2–2
4	(Germany) TSG Hoffenheim	6	0	3	3	11	14	−3	3		1–2	3–3	2–3	—

Source: UEFA

===== Group H =====
Pos	Team	Pld	W	D	L	GF	GA	GD	Pts	Qualification	JUV	MUN	VAL	YB
1	(Italy) Juventus	6	4	0	2	9	4	+5	12	Advance to knockout phase	—	1–2	1–0	3–0
2	(England) Manchester United	6	3	1	2	7	4	+3	10	Advance to knockout phase	0–1	—	0–0	1–0
3	(Spain) Valencia	6	2	2	2	6	6	0	8	Transfer to Europa League	0–2	2–1	—	3–1
4	(Switzerland) Young Boys	6	1	1	4	4	12	−8	4		2–1	0–3	1–1	—

Source: UEFA

==== Knockout phase ====
===== Round of 16 =====
Team 1	Agg.	Team 2	1st leg	2nd leg
Schalke 04 (Germany)	2–10	(England) Manchester City	2–3	0–7
Manchester United (England)	3–3 (a)	(France) Paris Saint-Germain	0–2	3–1
Tottenham Hotspur (England)	4–0	(Germany) Borussia Dortmund	3–0	1–0
Liverpool (England)	3–1	(Germany) Bayern Munich	0–0	3–1

===== Quarter-finals =====
Team 1	Agg.	Team 2	1st leg	2nd leg
Liverpool (England)	6–1	(Portugal) Porto	2–0	4–1
Tottenham Hotspur (England)	4–4 (a)	(England) Manchester City	1–0	3–4
Manchester United (England)	0–4 (Note: Order of legs reversed after original draw, in order to avoid a scheduling conflict with the Manchester City v Tottenham Hotspur match in the same city.)	(Spain) Barcelona	0–1	0–3

===== Semi-finals =====
Team 1	Agg.	Team 2	1st leg	2nd leg
Tottenham Hotspur (England)	3–3 (a)	(Netherlands) Ajax	0–1	3–2
Barcelona (Spain)	3–4	(England) Liverpool	3–0	0–4

===== Final =====
The final was played on 1 June 2019 at the Wanda Metropolitano in Madrid. The "home" team (for administrative purposes) was determined by an additional draw held after the quarter-final and semi-final draws. It was the second all-English final in the competition's history and the first since 2008.

1 June 2019
21:00 UTC+2

Tottenham Hotspur (England)	0–2	(England) Liverpool
	Report	Salah 2' (pen.); Origi 87'

Estadio Metropolitano, Madrid
Attendance: 63,272
Referee: Damir Skomina (Slovenia)

=== UEFA Europa League ===
==== Qualifying phase and play-off round ====
===== Second qualifying round =====
Team 1	Agg.	Team 2	1st leg	2nd leg
Aberdeen (Scotland)	2–4	(England) Burnley	1–1	1–3 (a.e.t.)

===== Third qualifying round =====
Team 1	Agg.	Team 2	1st leg	2nd leg
İstanbul Başakşehir (Turkey)	0–1	(England) Burnley	0–0	0–1

===== Play-off round =====
Team 1	Agg.	Team 2	1st leg	2nd leg
Olympiacos (Greece)	4–2	(England) Burnley	3–1	1–1

==== Group stage ====
===== Group E =====
Pos	Team	Pld	W	D	L	GF	GA	GD	Pts	Qualification	ARS	SPO	VOR	QRB
1	(England) Arsenal	6	5	1	0	12	2	+10	16	Advance to knockout phase	—	0–0	4–2	1–0
2	(Portugal) Sporting CP	6	4	1	1	13	3	+10	13	Advance to knockout phase	0–1	—	3–0	2–0
3	(Ukraine) Vorskla Poltava	6	1	0	5	4	13	−9	3 (Note: Goal difference in all group matches: Vorskla Poltava –9, Qarabağ –11.)		0–3	1–2	—	0–1
4	(Azerbaijan) Qarabağ	6	1	0	5	2	13	−11	3		0–3	1–6	0–1	—

Source: UEFA
Rules for classification: Group stage tiebreakers

===== Group L =====
Pos	Team	Pld	W	D	L	GF	GA	GD	Pts	Qualification	CHL	BATE	VID	PAOK
1	(England) Chelsea	6	5	1	0	12	3	+9	16	Advance to knockout phase	—	3–1	1–0	4–0
2	(Belarus) BATE Borisov	6	3	0	3	9	9	0	9	Advance to knockout phase	0–1	—	2–0	1–4
3	(Hungary) Vidi	6	2	1	3	5	7	−2	7		2–2	0–2	—	1–0
4	(Greece) PAOK	6	1	0	5	5	12	−7	3		0–1	1–3	0–2	—

Source: UEFA
Rules for classification: Group stage tiebreakers

==== Knockout phase ====
===== Round of 32 =====
Team 1	Agg.	Team 2	1st leg	2nd leg
Malmö FF (Sweden)	1–5	(England) Chelsea	1–2	0–3
BATE Borisov (Belarus)	1–3	(England) Arsenal	1–0	0–3

===== Round of 16 =====
Team 1	Agg.	Team 2	1st leg	2nd leg
Chelsea (England)	8–0	(Ukraine) Dynamo Kyiv	3–0	5–0
Rennes (France)	3–4	(England) Arsenal	3–1	0–3

===== Quarter-finals =====
Team 1	Agg.	Team 2	1st leg	2nd leg
Arsenal (England)	3–0 (Note: Order of legs reversed after original draw, in order to avoid a scheduling conflict with the Chelsea v Slavia Prague match in the same city.)	(Italy) Napoli	2–0	1–0
Slavia Prague (Czech Republic)	3–5	(England) Chelsea	0–1	3–4

===== Semi-finals =====
Team 1	Agg.	Team 2	1st leg	2nd leg
Arsenal (England)	7–3	(Spain) Valencia	3–1	4–2
Eintracht Frankfurt (Germany)	2–2 (3–4 p)	(England) Chelsea	1–1	1–1 (a.e.t.)

===== Final =====
The final was played on 29 May 2019 at the Olympic Stadium in Baku. The "home" team (for administrative purposes) was determined by an additional draw held after the quarter-final and semi-final draws. It was the second all-English final in the competition's history and the first since 1972, when it was first known as the UEFA Cup.

29 May 2019
23:00 UTC+4

Chelsea (England)	4–1	(England) Arsenal
Giroud 49'; Pedro 60'; Hazard 65' (pen.), 72'	Report	Iwobi 69'

Olympic Stadium, Baku
Attendance: 51,370
Referee: Gianluca Rocchi (Italy)

=== UEFA Youth League ===
==== Group stage ====
===== Group B =====
Pos	Team	Pld	W	D	L	GF	GA	GD	Pts	Qualification	BAR	TOT	INT	PSV
1	(Spain) Barcelona	6	3	2	1	8	6	+2	11	Round of 16	—	0–2	2–1	2–1
2	(England) Tottenham Hotspur	6	2	3	1	10	8	+2	9	Play-offs	1–1	—	2–4	2–0
3	(Italy) Inter Milan	6	2	1	3	10	9	+1	7		0–2	1–1	—	3–0
4	(Netherlands) PSV Eindhoven	6	1	2	3	6	11	−5	5		1–1	2–2	2–1	—

Source: UEFA

===== Group C =====
Pos	Team	Pld	W	D	L	GF	GA	GD	Pts	Qualification	LIV	PAR	NAP	RSB
1	(England) Liverpool	6	4	1	1	17	7	+10	13	Round of 16	—	5–2	5–0	2–1
2	(France) Paris Saint-Germain	6	4	1	1	13	10	+3	13	Play-offs	3–2	—	0–0	2–1
3	(Italy) Napoli	6	1	3	2	9	15	−6	6		1–1	2–5	—	5–3
4	(Serbia) Red Star Belgrade	6	0	1	5	6	13	−7	1		0–2	0–1	1–1	—

Source: UEFA

===== Group F =====
Pos	Team	Pld	W	D	L	GF	GA	GD	Pts	Qualification	HOF	LYO	MCI	SHK
1	(Germany) TSG Hoffenheim	6	3	2	1	15	10	+5	11	Round of 16	—	3–1	5–2	1–1
2	(France) Lyon	6	3	2	1	13	8	+5	11	Play-offs	3–3	—	2–0	2–0
3	(England) Manchester City	6	2	1	3	10	14	−4	7		2–1	1–4	—	4–1
4	(Ukraine) Shakhtar Donetsk	6	0	3	3	5	11	−6	3		1–2	1–1	1–1	—

Source: UEFA

===== Group H =====
Pos	Team	Pld	W	D	L	GF	GA	GD	Pts	Qualification	MUN	JUV	YB	VAL
1	(England) Manchester United	6	5	1	0	20	7	+13	16	Round of 16	—	4–1	6–2	4–0
2	(Italy) Juventus	6	3	1	2	11	11	0	10	Play-offs	2–2	—	2–1	3–0
3	(Switzerland) Young Boys	6	2	1	3	12	15	−3	7		1–2	4–2	—	3–3
4	(Spain) Valencia	6	0	1	5	4	14	−10	1		1–2	0–1	0–1	—

Source: UEFA

==== Domestic Champions Path ====
===== First round =====
Team 1	Agg.	Team 2	1st leg	2nd leg
Chelsea (England)	14–1	(Norway) Molde	10–1	4–0

===== Second round =====
Team 1	Agg.	Team 2	1st leg	2nd leg
Elfsborg (Sweden)	0–9	(England) Chelsea	0–3	0–6

==== Play-offs ====
Team 1	Score	Team 2
PAOK (Greece)	0–1	(England) Tottenham Hotspur
Chelsea (England)	3–1	(France) Monaco

==== Knockout phase ====
===== Round of 16 =====
Team 1	Score	Team 2
Chelsea (England)	2–1	(France) Montpellier
Midtjylland (Denmark)	3–1	(England) Manchester United
Dinamo Zagreb (Croatia)	2–1 (4–3 p)	(England) Liverpool
Porto (Portugal)	2–0	(England) Tottenham Hotspur

===== Quarter-finals =====
Team 1	Score	Team 2
Chelsea (England)	2–2 (4–2 p)	(Croatia) Dinamo Zagreb

===== Semi-finals =====
Team 1	Score	Team 2
Barcelona (Spain)	2–2 (4–5 p)	(England) Chelsea

===== Final =====
The final was played on 29 April 2019 at Colovray Stadium, Nyon.

29 April 2019
18:00 UTC+2

Porto (Portugal)	3–1	(England) Chelsea
Vieira 17'; Queirós 55'; Sousa 75'	Report	Redan 53'

Colovray Stadium, Nyon
Referee: François Letexier (France)

=== UEFA Women's Champions League ===
==== Knockout phase ====
===== Round of 32 =====
Team 1	Agg.	Team 2	1st leg	2nd leg
SFK 2000 (Bosnia and Herzegovina)	0–11	(England) Chelsea	0–5	0–6
Atlético Madrid (Spain)	3–1	(England) Manchester City	1–1	2–0

===== Round of 16 =====
Team 1	Agg.	Team 2	1st leg	2nd leg
Chelsea (England)	7–0	(Italy) Fiorentina	1–0	6–0

===== Quarter-finals =====
Team 1	Agg.	Team 2	1st leg	2nd leg
Chelsea (England)	3–2	(France) Paris Saint-Germain	2–0	1–2

===== Semi-finals =====
Team 1	Agg.	Team 2	1st leg	2nd leg
Lyon (France)	3–2	(England) Chelsea	2–1	1–1

== Men's football ==
League Division	Promoted to league ▲	Relegated from league ▼
Premier League	Wolverhampton Wanderers ▲; Cardiff City ▲; Fulham ▲	West Bromwich Albion ▼; Stoke City ▼; Swansea City ▼
Championship	Wigan Athletic ▲; Blackburn Rovers ▲; Rotherham United ▲	Barnsley ▼; Burton Albion ▼; Sunderland ▼
League One	Accrington Stanley ▲; Luton Town ▲; Wycombe Wanderers ▲; Coventry City ▲	Bury ▼; MK Dons ▼; Northampton Town ▼; Oldham Athletic ▼
League Two	Macclesfield Town ▲; Tranmere Rovers ▲	Barnet ▼; Chesterfield ▼
National League	Havant & Waterlooville ▲; Salford City ▲; Harrogate Town ▲; Braintree Town ▲	Chester ▼; Guiseley ▼; Torquay United ▼; Woking ▼

=== Premier League ===
In one of the closest title races since the formation of the Premier League, with a new points total set for finishing second, Manchester City became the first top-flight team in a decade to retain their title in part thanks to a late run that saw them win their last 14 games – despite falling short in the Champions League, the Sky Blues became the first team in English football to complete a domestic treble, by once again retaining the League Cup and securing their first FA Cup since 2011. Liverpool finished second, missing out on ending their wait for a league title once again, despite pushing City all the way to the final day and once again finishing their league campaign unbeaten at Anfield as well as having been top at Christmas; however, it was in Europe that the Reds enjoyed more success as they made it to a second successive Champions League final against the odds, including a stunning 4–0 victory at home to Barcelona - and ultimately made amends for the previous season's loss, winning their sixth European title and their first under manager Jurgen Klopp.

The battle for the top four also proved to be a close-run battle, with each of Tottenham Hotspur, Arsenal, Chelsea and Manchester United fighting for the last two Champions League spots – in the end, securing the spots for Europe's elite competition were Chelsea, who also reached the final of the League Cup and won the Europa League to at least ensure a trophy but endured another disappointing league campaign that saw talk of a potential third title in five seasons rapidly fade away in the New Year, and Tottenham Hotspur, who also saw talk of a potential title win diminish owing in part to a poor run of league form from March onwards; however, the North London side more than made up for this by also reaching their first ever Champions League final in a European run that saw them narrowly edge past both Manchester City and Dutch front-runners Ajax, ultimately falling to fellow English side Liverpool in a tight final. Arsenal and Manchester United were forced to settle for fifth and sixth respectively, the Gunners missing out on Champions League qualification once again on two different fronts, falling to Chelsea in the Europa League final to mark a disappointing end to Unai Emery's first season in charge, whilst the Red Devils endured a problematic season across all tournaments with even the sacking of manager José Mourinho and then the temporary appointment of United legend Ole Gunnar Solskjær (an act later made permanent) failing to provide much spark to the Manchester side.

Wolverhampton Wanderers enjoyed the best top-flight season for a newly promoted side since Ipswich Town in 2001, finishing 7th; this represented their best finish in the English pyramid since finishing 6th in 1980. 7th was also enough for the Europa League qualifying rounds, and this, added to a run to the semi-finals of the FA Cup - their longest such run in 21 years - earned Portuguese manager Nuno Espírito Santo and his team plenty of praise. Leicester City endured a troubling season both on and off the pitch, first suffering tragedy with the death of club owner Vichai Srivaddhanaprabha in a helicopter crash shortly after a 1–1 home draw with West Ham United – with the Foxes then enduring a run of poor results against lesser sides in 2019, including a third-round FA Cup exit at the hands of League Two side Newport County, resulting in the dismissal of manager Claude Puel; however, the appointment of former Liverpool manager Brendan Rodgers helped push the club back up the table and to a top-ten finish.

Watford finished not far behind the Foxes, also enjoying their greatest top-flight season since finishing 2nd in 1984, the Hornets breaking the 50 point barrier and narrowly missing out on the top ten on top of reaching the final of the FA Cup for the first time in over 30 years, ultimately failing at the hands of Manchester City. Having successfully qualified for the qualifying rounds of the Europa League the previous season, Burnley endured a troublesome first half of the campaign that saw them first narrowly miss out on a Europa League group stage spot and then find themselves firmly in the relegation zone at Christmas; however, the return of influential goalkeeper Tom Heaton after Boxing Day saw the Clarets fight their way out of the bottom three with games to spare. A very poor start to the season saw Southampton stuck in a relegation battle for the second season running, resulting in the dismissal of Mark Hughes in early December – despite the threat of the drop hanging over them until the closing months, a resurgence under former RB Leipzig manager and Austrian Ralph Hasenhüttl saw the Saints climb away from the bottom three and towards safety with games to spare.

At the bottom of the table, both Huddersfield Town and Fulham endured early relegations – the two clubs never really looking like escaping the drop; whilst the Terriers (who arguably found themselves suffering from second season syndrome) saved some face by narrowly avoiding breaking the records for the most defeats and most goals conceded in a 38-game season, the London side fell back into the Championship at the first time of asking in almost similar fashion to their previous top-flight season by having three different managers throughout the campaign and conceding more goals than anyone else. The fight to avoid the final spot proved to be much closer, with Cardiff City once again falling back into the second tier after just one season – a consequence of a poor start to the season and several defeats from winnable games, though the Bluebirds at least went down fighting in a season also marked with off-field tragedy, with the death of club record signing Emiliano Sala on his way to joining the team for the first time; in addition, as a result of Cardiff's relegation and Swansea's failure to mount a real promotion charge, it meant that the Premier League would not have a Welsh presence for the first time in nine seasons.

Pos	Team	Pld	W	D	L	GF	GA	GD	Pts	Qualification or relegation
1	Manchester City (C)	38	32	2	4	95	23	+72	98	Qualification to Champions League group stage
2	Liverpool	38	30	7	1	89	22	+67	97	Qualification to Champions League group stage
3	Chelsea	38	21	9	8	63	39	+24	72	Qualification to Champions League group stage
4	Tottenham Hotspur	38	23	2	13	67	39	+28	71	Qualification to Champions League group stage
5	Arsenal	38	21	7	10	73	51	+22	70	Qualification to Europa League group stage (Note: Since the winners of the EFL Cup and the FA Cup, Manchester City, qualified for the Champions League, the spot given to the FA Cup winners (Europa League group stage) was passed to the sixth-placed team and the spot given to the League Cup winners (Europa League second qualifying round) was passed to the seventh-placed team.)
6	Manchester United	38	19	9	10	65	54	+11	66	Qualification to Europa League group stage
7	Wolverhampton Wanderers	38	16	9	13	47	46	+1	57	Qualification to Europa League second qualifying round
8	Everton	38	15	9	14	54	46	+8	54	
9	Leicester City	38	15	7	16	51	48	+3	52	
10	West Ham United	38	15	7	16	52	55	−3	52	
11	Watford	38	14	8	16	52	59	−7	50	
12	Crystal Palace	38	14	7	17	51	53	−2	49	
13	Newcastle United	38	12	9	17	42	48	−6	45	
14	Bournemouth	38	13	6	19	56	70	−14	45	
15	Burnley	38	11	7	20	45	68	−23	40	
16	Southampton	38	9	12	17	45	65	−20	39	
17	Brighton & Hove Albion	38	9	9	20	35	60	−25	36	
18	Cardiff City (R)	38	10	4	24	34	69	−35	34	Relegation to EFL Championship
19	Fulham (R)	38	7	5	26	34	81	−47	26	Relegation to EFL Championship
20	Huddersfield Town (R)	38	3	7	28	22	76	−54	16	Relegation to EFL Championship

Source: Premier League
Rules for classification: 1) Points; 2) Goal difference; 3) Goals scored; 4) Play-offs (only if needed to decide champion, teams for relegation or teams for UEFA competitions).
(C) Champions; (R) Relegated

=== Championship ===
Despite making a slow start to the season on top of losing star player James Maddison to Leicester City in the summer, Norwich City secured their third promotion to the Premier League in eight seasons – whilst a late run of draws in April threatened to derail the Canaries' hopes, the Norfolk side never looked like falling out of the top two and secured promotion in German head coach Daniel Farke's second season in charge. The battle for second place went down to the wire between Yorkshire sides Leeds United and Sheffield United – but it was ultimately the Blades who won the fight, securing their second promotion in three seasons and returning to the top-flight for the first time since 2007, earning manager Chris Wilder his first taste of the top-flight; as with the previous few seasons, a horrendous late-season run ultimately proved costly to Leeds, to the point where they only even managed to finish as high as third due to West Bromwich Albion failing to win their own final game of the season; both teams were subsequently knocked out in the play-off semi-finals. Instead taking the final promotion spot were Aston Villa in what proved to be a roller coaster campaign, the Villans making amends for their play-off final loss the previous season and ending a three-year absence from the top-flight in Dean Smith's first season as manager - at the expense of Derby County, who none-the-less enjoyed a fantastic season under new manager Frank Lampard.

Swansea City's first season in the Championship since 2011 saw them stuck mostly in mid-table – with growing fan protests off-field towards the running of the club that had seen them relegated resulting in the resignation of the Swans' long-time chairman Huw Jenkins in early 2019. Likewise, having been widely tipped to win promotion back to the top-flight at the first attempt, Stoke City endured a largely mediocre league season that saw them fight more to avoid relegation rather than win promotion, draw a staggering 22 times and change managers twice. Having made a strong start to their league season, a collapse in form nearly saw Wigan Athletic relegated from the second tier for the third time in five seasons; however, the Manchester-based club recovered enough in the second half of the season to escape the drop and ensure a second successive season on the second level of league football.

After 17 consecutive seasons in the second tier and a succession of mid-table finishes, Ipswich Town's luck finally gave out and they endured relegation to the third tier for the first time in 62 years, the Tractor Boys never really looking like escaping the drop after falling to the foot of the table in early October and with only five wins all season. Bolton Wanderers finished just above them, falling back into League One on Good Friday after two seasons and in a campaign full of struggle both on and off the pitch, amid severe financial problems on top of nearly having their last run of home games cancelled altogether (and then actually having their last home game against Brentford cancelled); to make matters worse, the Trotters were then forced into administration after the season ended, becoming the first club to have the increased 12-point deduction imposed on them for the following season. Taking the final spot were Rotherham United, who gave themselves a decent chance of escaping the drop, but eventually fell back into the third tier for the second time in three seasons, the Yorkshire club ultimately being let down once again by their atrocious away record - just one win on the road, and one win in their last 48 second tier away games - and a failure to turn any one of their 16 draws into wins or take advantage of their relegation rivals slipping up.

Pos	Team	Pld	W	D	L	GF	GA	GD	Pts	Promotion, qualification or relegation
1	Norwich City (C, P)	46	27	13	6	93	57	+36	94	Promotion to the Premier League
2	Sheffield United (P)	46	26	11	9	78	41	+37	89	Promotion to the Premier League
3	Leeds United	46	25	8	13	73	50	+23	83	Qualification for Championship play-offs (Note: Four teams play for one spot and promotion to the Premier League.)
4	West Bromwich Albion	46	23	11	12	87	62	+25	80	Qualification for Championship play-offs
5	Aston Villa (O, P)	46	20	16	10	82	61	+21	76	Qualification for Championship play-offs
6	Derby County	46	20	14	12	69	54	+15	74	Qualification for Championship play-offs
7	Middlesbrough	46	20	13	13	49	41	+8	73	
8	Bristol City	46	19	13	14	59	53	+6	70	
9	Nottingham Forest	46	17	15	14	61	54	+7	66	
10	Swansea City	46	18	11	17	65	62	+3	65	
11	Brentford	46	17	13	16	73	59	+14	64 (Note: Brentford were awarded a 1–0 win over Bolton due to Bolton's inability to hold the fixture.)	
12	Sheffield Wednesday	46	16	16	14	60	62	−2	64	
13	Hull City	46	17	11	18	66	68	−2	62	
14	Preston North End	46	16	13	17	67	67	0	61	
15	Blackburn Rovers	46	16	12	18	64	69	−5	60	
16	Stoke City	46	11	22	13	45	52	−7	55	
17	Birmingham City	46	14	19	13	64	58	+6	52 (Note: Birmingham City were deducted 9 points for failure to comply with the EFL profitability and sustainability rules.)	
18	Wigan Athletic	46	13	13	20	51	64	−13	52	
19	Queens Park Rangers	46	14	9	23	53	71	−18	51	
20	Reading	46	10	17	19	49	66	−17	47	
21	Millwall	46	10	14	22	48	64	−16	44	
22	Rotherham United (R)	46	8	16	22	52	83	−31	40	Relegation to EFL League One
23	Bolton Wanderers (R)	46	8	8	30	29	78	−49	32	Relegation to EFL League One
24	Ipswich Town (R)	46	5	16	25	36	77	−41	31	Relegation to EFL League One

Source: Sky Sports Archived 25 September 2019 at the Wayback Machine
Rules for classification: 1) Points; 2) Goal difference; 3) Number of goals scored; 4) Head-to-head results
(C) Champions; (O) Play-off winners; (P) Promoted; (R) Relegated

=== League One ===
In one of the most remarkable campaigns of the season and in spite of losing influential manager Nathan Jones to Stoke City in January, Luton Town defied their critics and stormed their way to promotion for the second season running, returning to the Championship for the first time since 2007 and going up as champions – whilst remaining unbeaten at their home ground in the league for the entire season. The fight for the second spot went all the way to the penultimate game with Barnsley, Football League Trophy winners Portsmouth and Sunderland fighting it out; the spot ultimately went to Barnsley, who secured an immediate return to the second-tier in German head coach Daniel Stendel's first season in charge, also impressing with an unbeaten league home record as well. Taking the final promotion place were Charlton Athletic, who dramatically scored in the last minute of normal time against Sunderland in the playoff final to end a 3-year exile from the Championship and consign the Black Cats to another season in League One.

Burton Albion's season saw them in the bottom half of the table more often than the top, and did not win an immediate return to the second tier. Blackpool's league season proved to be mediocre, with the Lancashire club also finishing mid-table. Off the pitch, the Seasiders saw the removal of Owen Oyston after over 30 years as owner and after years of fan protests and legal battles with former chairman Valērijs Belokoņs. In their first season in the third tier, Accrington Stanley finished mid-table – a commendable effort for the Lancashire side.

The second half of the season saw one of the tightest relegation battles in the history of the third tier, with 12 teams remaining in the mix from January onwards – but ultimately, it was Bradford City, Scunthorpe United, Walsall and Plymouth Argyle who fell into League Two; whilst Bradford's relegation came just two years after narrowly missing out on promotion to the Championship and in a season where they had three different managers and Scunthorpe United fell back into the fourth tier after five years in League One, Walsall had actually spent the first couple of weeks challenging for promotion before results rapidly declined and Plymouth Argyle again looked like masterminding an unlikely escape from the drop like they had done the previous campaign, only for results to go against them in the final games of the season. Having been in bottom position for nearly the entire season and 10 points from avoiding relegation after 31 games, a late run of 7 wins and 27 points in their last 15 games ensured that AFC Wimbledon would remain in League One for a fourth consecutive campaign, narrowly surviving on goal difference.

Pos	Team	Pld	W	D	L	GF	GA	GD	Pts	Promotion, qualification or relegation
1	Luton Town (C, P)	46	27	13	6	90	42	+48	94	Promotion to the EFL Championship
2	Barnsley (P)	46	26	13	7	80	39	+41	91	Promotion to the EFL Championship
3	Charlton Athletic (O, P)	46	26	10	10	73	40	+33	88	Qualification for League One play-offs (Note: Four teams play for one spot and promotion to the EFL Championship.)
4	Portsmouth	46	25	13	8	83	51	+32	88	Qualification for League One play-offs
5	Sunderland	46	22	19	5	80	47	+33	85	Qualification for League One play-offs
6	Doncaster Rovers	46	20	13	13	76	58	+18	73	Qualification for League One play-offs
7	Peterborough United	46	20	12	14	71	62	+9	72	
8	Coventry City	46	18	11	17	54	54	0	65	
9	Burton Albion	46	17	12	17	66	57	+9	63	
10	Blackpool	46	15	17	14	50	52	−2	62	
11	Fleetwood Town	46	16	13	17	58	52	+6	61	
12	Oxford United	46	15	15	16	58	64	−6	60	
13	Gillingham	46	15	10	21	61	72	−11	55	
14	Accrington Stanley	46	14	13	19	51	67	−16	55	
15	Bristol Rovers	46	13	15	18	47	50	−3	54	
16	Rochdale	46	15	9	22	54	87	−33	54	
17	Wycombe Wanderers	46	14	11	21	55	67	−12	53	
18	Shrewsbury Town	46	12	16	18	51	59	−8	52	
19	Southend United	46	14	8	24	55	68	−13	50	
20	AFC Wimbledon	46	13	11	22	42	63	−21	50	
21	Plymouth Argyle (R)	46	13	11	22	56	80	−24	50	Relegation to EFL League Two
22	Walsall (R)	46	12	11	23	49	71	−22	47	Relegation to EFL League Two
23	Scunthorpe United (R)	46	12	10	24	53	83	−30	46	Relegation to EFL League Two
24	Bradford City (R)	46	11	8	27	49	77	−28	41	Relegation to EFL League Two

Source: EFL Official Website
Rules for classification: 1) Points; 2) Goal difference; 3) Number of goals scored; 4) Head-to-head results
(C) Champions; (O) Play-off winners; (P) Promoted; (R) Relegated

=== League Two ===
Just two seasons after returning to the Football League as fifth tier champions and only one year after victory in the Football League Trophy, Lincoln City ended their season with another success to their name with promotion to League One and earning their first promotion to the third tier in over 20 years – despite the closeness of the promotion race, the Lincolnshire side remained in the top two for practically the entire season and mathematically secured first place on Easter Monday. The race for the remaining automatic promotions was a close-ran battle between Mansfield Town, Bury and Milton Keynes Dons; Bury were the second team to ensure promotion, returning to League One at the first attempt, whilst Milton Keynes Dons took the final spot in the last game of the campaign in a winner-takes-all match against Mansfield Town, also securing an immediate return to the third tier and finally giving new manager Paul Tisdale promotion after two unsuccessful play-off final attempts with Exeter City. Taking the final spot through the play-offs were Tranmere Rovers, whose return to the Football League saw the North West club successfully challenge for a second consecutive promotion, winning out against Newport County in the final at Wembley in the dying seconds of extra-time.

Despite narrowly missing out on ending a 32-year exile from the third tier, Newport County enjoyed what proved to be a great season; having looking like missing out on the play-offs altogether, the Welsh side made a late rally and edged their way into the top seven in their final game, a big achievement in a season where they also enjoyed an impressive FA Cup run that saw them make it to the fifth round – beating top-flight Leicester City and second-tier promotion-chasers Middlesbrough – before ultimately falling to Manchester City at Rodney Parade. Oldham Athletic made a strong start to their season before results rapidly fell aware and they fell into mid-table, with not even the appointment of former player Paul Scholes as manager (who then promptly resigned after 7 games) having much impact on the Latics.

In spite of having made a very poor start on their return to the Football League and then only narrowly avoiding breaking the record for the longest winless run, Macclesfield Town defied their critics and scraped their way to safety, in parts thanks to the surprise appointment of former England defender Sol Campbell as manager. Suffering relegation instead were Yeovil Town and Notts County – the Glovers falling out of the Football League just six years after winning promotion to the Championship and sixteen years after entering the fourth tier for the first time, a strong start to the season rapidly falling away in stunning fashion and the Magpies becoming the oldest club in English football to fall into non-league football, having been a member of the Football League since its inception 131 years previously and having never fallen out of the fourth tier before. This also made them the first of the Football League's founder members to suffer automatic relegation from the league, albeit with several of the others having lost (and later regained) their places under the previous election system.

Pos	Team	Pld	W	D	L	GF	GA	GD	Pts	Promotion, qualification or relegation
1	Lincoln City (C, P)	46	23	16	7	73	43	+30	85	Promotion to EFL League One
2	Bury (P)	46	22	13	11	82	56	+26	79	Promotion to EFL League One
3	Milton Keynes Dons (P)	46	23	10	13	71	49	+22	79	Promotion to EFL League One
4	Mansfield Town	46	20	16	10	69	41	+28	76	Qualification for League Two play-offs (Note: Four teams play for one spot and promotion to EFL League One.)
5	Forest Green Rovers	46	20	14	12	68	47	+21	74	Qualification for League Two play-offs
6	Tranmere Rovers (O, P)	46	20	13	13	63	50	+13	73	Qualification for League Two play-offs
7	Newport County	46	20	11	15	59	59	0	71	Qualification for League Two play-offs
8	Colchester United	46	20	10	16	65	53	+12	70	
9	Exeter City	46	19	13	14	60	49	+11	70	
10	Stevenage	46	20	10	16	59	55	+4	70	
11	Carlisle United	46	20	8	18	67	62	+5	68	
12	Crewe Alexandra	46	19	8	19	60	59	+1	65	
13	Swindon Town	46	16	16	14	59	56	+3	64	
14	Oldham Athletic	46	16	14	16	67	60	+7	62	
15	Northampton Town	46	14	19	13	64	63	+1	61	
16	Cheltenham Town	46	15	12	19	57	68	−11	57	
17	Grimsby Town	46	16	8	22	45	56	−11	56	
18	Morecambe	46	14	12	20	54	70	−16	54	
19	Crawley Town	46	15	8	23	51	68	−17	53	
20	Port Vale	46	12	13	21	39	55	−16	49	
21	Cambridge United	46	12	11	23	40	66	−26	47	
22	Macclesfield Town	46	10	14	22	48	74	−26	44	
23	Notts County (R)	46	9	14	23	48	84	−36	41	Relegation to the National League
24	Yeovil Town (R)	46	9	13	24	41	66	−25	40	Relegation to the National League

Source: EFL Official Website
Rules for classification: 1) Points; 2) Goal difference; 3) Number of goals scored; 4) Head-to-head results
(C) Champions; (O) Play-off winners; (P) Promoted; (R) Relegated

=== National League Top Division ===
In one of the tightest promotion races in the history of the fifth tier and just two seasons after their spectacular fall into non-league football, Leyton Orient finally returned to the Football League, never looking like falling out of the promotion race and narrowly edging the automatic promotion spot in manager Justin Edinburgh's first full season as manager; the season ended in tragedy, however, following Edinburgh's death from cardiac arrest the following month. In their first season in the fifth tier, Salford City narrowly missed out on automatic promotion - but made up for it by winning the play-offs, earning promotion to League Two and the Football League for the first time in their 79-year history.

Despite languishing near the bottom of the table for most of the season, a late surge in results saved Dover Athletic, while Chesterfield almost suffered a third consecutive relegation after a long winless run in the league stretching from August to December, before the appointment of veteran manager John Sheridan in the new year helped the club find form and move away from the bottom.

At the bottom of the table, all four relegated teams were confirmed with at least three games to go – Aldershot Town, Braintree Town, Havant and Waterlooville and Maidstone United. While both Braintree and Havant suffered immediate relegation back to the National League South, the second time in three seasons for the former, Aldershot Town's relegation came only six seasons after they had dropped out of League Two. Maidstone United had played at the highest level of the National League for three years. However, Aldershot were granted a reprieve from relegation when Gateshead were demoted two divisions (later reduced to one on appeal) for breaching the league's financial regulations.

Pos	Team	Pld	W	D	L	GF	GA	GD	Pts	Promotion, qualification or relegation
1	Leyton Orient (C, P)	46	25	14	7	73	35	+38	89	Promotion to EFL League Two
2	Solihull Moors	46	25	11	10	73	43	+30	86	Qualification for the National League play-off semi-finals
3	Salford City (O, P)	46	25	10	11	77	45	+32	85	Qualification for the National League play-off semi-finals
4	Wrexham	46	25	9	12	58	39	+19	84	Qualification for the National League play-off quarter-finals
5	AFC Fylde	46	22	15	9	72	41	+31	81	Qualification for the National League play-off quarter-finals
6	Harrogate Town	46	21	11	14	78	57	+21	74	Qualification for the National League play-off quarter-finals
7	Eastleigh	46	22	8	16	62	63	−1	74	Qualification for the National League play-off quarter-finals
8	Ebbsfleet United	46	18	13	15	64	50	+14	67	
9	Sutton United	46	17	14	15	55	60	−5	65	
10	Barrow	46	17	13	16	52	51	+1	64	
11	Bromley	46	16	12	18	68	69	−1	60	
12	Barnet	46	16	12	18	45	50	−5	60	
13	Dover Athletic	46	16	12	18	58	64	−6	60	
14	Chesterfield	46	14	17	15	55	53	+2	59	
15	FC Halifax Town	46	13	20	13	44	43	+1	59	
16	Hartlepool United	46	15	14	17	56	62	−6	59	
17	Gateshead (R)	46	19	9	18	52	48	+4	57 (Note: Gateshead were deducted 9 points for breach of financial regulations.)	Relegation to National League North
18	Dagenham & Redbridge	46	15	11	20	50	56	−6	56	
19	Maidenhead United	46	16	6	24	45	70	−25	54	
20	Boreham Wood	46	12	16	18	53	65	−12	52	
21	Aldershot Town	46	11	11	24	38	67	−29	44 (Note: Gateshead were demoted to the National League North on 8 June 2019 because of financial irregularities. As a result, Aldershot Town were given a reprieve from relegation.)	
22	Havant & Waterlooville (R)	46	9	13	24	62	84	−22	40	Relegation to National League South
23	Braintree Town (R)	46	11	8	27	48	78	−30	38 (Note: Braintree Town were deducted 3 points for fielding an ineligible player in a game against AFC Fylde.)	Relegation to National League South
24	Maidstone United (R)	46	9	7	30	37	82	−45	34	Relegation to National League South

Source: National League official site
Rules for classification: 1) Points; 2) Goal difference; 3) Number of goals scored; 4) Number of matches won; 5) Head-to-head results
(C) Champions; (O) Play-off winners; (P) Promoted; (R) Relegated

=== League play-offs ===
==== Football League play-offs ====
===== EFL Championship =====
====== Final ======
27 May 2019
15:00 BST

Aston Villa	2–1	Derby County
El Ghazi 44'; McGinn 59'	Report	Marriott 81'

Wembley Stadium, London
Attendance: 85,826
Referee: Paul Tierney

===== EFL League One =====
====== Final ======
26 May 2019
15:00 BST

Charlton Athletic	2–1	Sunderland
Purrington 35'; Bauer 90+4'	Report	Sarr 5' (o.g.)

Wembley Stadium, London
Attendance: 76,155
Referee: Andrew Madley

===== EFL League Two =====
====== Final ======
25 May 2019
15:00 BST (UTC+1)

Newport County	0–1 (a.e.t.)	Tranmere Rovers
		Jennings 119'

Wembley Stadium, London
Attendance: 25,217
Referee: Ross Joyce

==== National League play-offs ====
===== National League =====
====== Final ======
11 May 2019
15:00

AFC Fylde	0–3	Salford City
	Report	Dieseruvwe 15'; Piergianni 53'; Touray 61'

Wembley Stadium, London
Attendance: 8,049
Referee: James Oldham

===== National League North =====
====== Final ======
12 June 2019

Chorley	1–1	Spennymoor Town
Penalties
	4–3

Victory Park, Chorley

===== National League South =====
====== Final ======
12 May 2019

Woking	1–0	Welling United

Kingfield Stadium, Woking

=== Cup competitions ===
==== FA Cup ====
===== Final =====
18 May 2019
17:00 BST

Manchester City	6–0	Watford
D. Silva 26'; Gabriel Jesus 38', 68'; De Bruyne 61'; Sterling 81', 87'

Wembley Stadium, London
Attendance: 85,854
Referee: Kevin Friend (Leicestershire)

==== EFL Cup ====
===== Final =====
24 February 2019
16:30 GMT

Chelsea	0–0 (a.e.t.)	Manchester City
	Report
Penalties
Jorginho (penalty missed); Azpilicueta (penalty scored); Emerson (penalty scored); David Luiz (penalty missed); Hazard (penalty scored)	3–4	(penalty scored) Gündoğan; (penalty scored) Agüero; (penalty missed) Sané; (penalty scored) B. Silva; (penalty scored) Sterling

Wembley Stadium, London
Attendance: 81,775
Referee: Jon Moss (West Yorkshire)

==== Community Shield ====
5 August 2018
15:00 BST

Chelsea	0–2	Manchester City
	Report	Agüero 13', 58'

Wembley Stadium, London
Attendance: 72,724
Referee: Jon Moss (West Yorkshire)

==== EFL Trophy ====
===== Final =====
31 March 2019
14:30 BST

Portsmouth	2–2 (a.e.t.)	Sunderland
Thompson 82'; Lowe 114'	Report	McGeady 38', 119'
Penalties
Evans (penalty scored); Pitman (penalty scored); Brown (penalty scored); Lowe (penalty scored); Hawkins (penalty scored)	5–4	(penalty scored) McGeady; (penalty missed) Cattermole; (penalty scored) Gooch; (penalty scored) Power; (penalty scored) O'Nien

Wembley Stadium, London
Attendance: 85,021
Referee: Dean Whitestone

==== FA Trophy ====
===== Final =====
19 May 2019
16:15

AFC Fylde	1–0	Leyton Orient
Rowe 60'	Report

Wembley Stadium, London
Attendance: 42,962
Referee: Andrew Madley

== Women's football ==
=== Women's Super League ===
Pos	Team	Pld	W	D	L	GF	GA	GD	Pts	Qualification
1	Arsenal (C)	20	18	0	2	70	13	+57	54	Qualification for the Champions League knockout phase
2	Manchester City	20	14	5	1	53	17	+36	47	Qualification for the Champions League knockout phase
3	Chelsea	20	12	6	2	46	14	+32	42	
4	Birmingham City	20	13	1	6	29	17	+12	40	
5	Reading	20	8	3	9	33	30	+3	27	
6	Bristol City	20	7	4	9	17	34	−17	25	
7	West Ham United	20	7	2	11	25	37	−12	23	
8	Liverpool	20	7	1	12	21	38	−17	22	
9	Brighton & Hove Albion	20	4	4	12	16	38	−22	16	
10	Everton	20	3	3	14	15	38	−23	12	
11	Yeovil Town (R)	20	2	1	17	11	60	−49	−3 (Note: Yeovil Town deducted 10 points for entering administration.)	Relegation to the Championship

Source: FA WSL
Rules for classification: 1) Points; 2) Goal difference; 3) Number of goals scored
(C) Champions; (R) Relegated

=== Women's Championship ===
Pos	Team	Pld	W	D	L	GF	GA	GD	Pts	Qualification
1	Manchester United (C, P)	20	18	1	1	98	7	+91	55	Promotion to the WSL (Note: Dependent on obtaining a licence.)
2	Tottenham Hotspur (P)	20	15	1	4	44	27	+17	46	Promotion to the WSL
3	Charlton Athletic	20	13	2	5	49	21	+28	41	
4	Durham	20	11	6	3	37	16	+21	39	
5	Sheffield United	20	11	1	8	35	31	+4	34	
6	Aston Villa	20	6	8	6	30	39	−9	26	
7	Leicester City	20	6	3	11	27	44	−17	21	
8	London Bees	20	7	0	13	23	48	−25	21	
9	Lewes	20	5	2	13	23	47	−24	17	
10	Crystal Palace	20	3	2	15	14	44	−30	11	
11	Millwall Lionesses	20	1	2	17	14	70	−56	5	

Source: FA WSL
Rules for classification: 1) Points; 2) Goal difference; 3) Number of goals scored
(C) Champions; (P) Promoted

=== Women's National League ===
==== Northern Premier Division ====
Pos	Team	Pld	W	D	L	GF	GA	GD	Pts	Promotion or relegation
1	Blackburn Rovers (C, O, P)	24	23	0	1	115	18	+97	69	Promotion to the Championship, qualification for the Championship play-off
2	Sunderland	24	15	3	6	83	36	+47	48	
3	Derby County	24	15	3	6	54	35	+19	48	
4	Huddersfield Town	24	15	2	7	79	40	+39	47	
5	Middlesbrough	24	13	4	7	60	41	+19	43	
6	Fylde	24	13	3	8	48	33	+15	42	
7	Stoke City	24	9	6	9	59	51	+8	33	
8	Guiseley Vixens	24	9	4	11	45	48	−3	31	
9	Nottingham Forest	24	7	4	13	29	57	−28	25	
10	Hull City	24	7	2	15	41	65	−24	23	
11	Sheffield	24	6	3	15	37	55	−18	21	
12	Doncaster Rovers Belles (R)	24	4	6	14	32	75	−43	18	Relegation to the Division One Midlands
13	Bradford City (R)	24	0	0	24	12	140	−128	0	Relegation to the Division One North

Source: FA Full-Time
Rules for classification: 1) Points; 2) Goal difference; 3) Number of goals scored
(C) Champions; (O) Play-off winners; (P) Promoted; (R) Relegated

==== Southern Premier Division ====
Pos	Team	Pld	W	D	L	GF	GA	GD	Pts	Promotion or relegation
1	Coventry United (C, P)	22	18	3	1	80	14	+66	57	Promotion to the Championship, qualification for the Championship play-off
2	Cardiff City	22	16	2	4	58	26	+32	50	
3	Chichester City	22	15	1	6	48	27	+21	46	
4	Oxford United	22	13	2	7	56	24	+32	41	
5	Watford	22	13	1	8	43	40	+3	40	
6	Plymouth Argyle	22	11	2	9	50	54	−4	35	
7	Loughborough Foxes	22	10	4	8	48	32	+16	34	
8	Portsmouth	22	9	1	12	41	38	+3	28	
9	Milton Keynes Dons	22	6	1	15	28	52	−24	19	
10	Gillingham	22	5	4	13	24	54	−30	19	
11	Queens Park Rangers	22	2	5	15	28	69	−41	11	
12	C & K Basildon (R)	22	0	2	20	17	91	−74	2	Relegation to the Division One South East

Source: FA Full-Time
Rules for classification: 1) Points; 2) Goal difference; 3) Number of goals scored
(C) Champions; (P) Promoted; (R) Relegated

==== Division One North ====
Pos	Team	Pld	W	D	L	GF	GA	GD	Pts	Promotion or relegation
1	Burnley (C, P)	22	18	2	2	39	14	+25	56	Promotion to the Northern Premier Division
2	Brighouse Town	22	12	7	3	44	20	+24	43	
3	Chester-le-Street	22	13	3	6	40	27	+13	42	
4	Barnsley	22	12	5	5	52	34	+18	41	
5	Liverpool Feds	22	10	5	7	57	39	+18	35	
6	Leeds United	22	10	4	8	34	28	+6	34	
7	Chorley	22	8	4	10	33	35	−2	28	
8	Bolton Wanderers	22	7	5	10	24	27	−3	26	
9	Newcastle United	22	7	4	11	28	31	−3	25	
10	Norton & Stockton Ancients	22	7	2	13	51	57	−6	23	
11	Morecambe (R)	22	3	5	14	35	69	−34	14	Relegation from the National League
12	Crewe Alexandra (R)	22	1	2	19	15	71	−56	5	Relegation from the National League

Source: FA Full-Time
Rules for classification: 1) Points; 2) Goal difference; 3) Number of goals scored
(C) Champions; (P) Promoted; (R) Relegated

==== Division One Midlands ====
Pos	Team	Pld	W	D	L	GF	GA	GD	Pts	Promotion or relegation
1	West Bromwich Albion (C, P)	20	19	0	1	97	15	+82	57	Northern Premier Division
2	Wolverhampton Wanderers	20	17	0	3	98	14	+84	51	
3	Birmingham & West Midlands	20	13	2	5	68	26	+42	41	
4	Sporting Khalsa	20	11	3	6	49	40	+9	36	
5	Bedworth United	20	11	1	8	46	46	0	34	
6	Long Eaton United	20	9	2	9	48	41	+7	29	
7	Nettleham	20	9	1	10	38	43	−5	28	
8	The New Saints	20	8	1	11	57	49	+8	25	
9	Burton Albion	20	4	3	13	30	71	−41	15	
10	Solihull	20	2	0	18	18	88	−70	6	
11	Steel City Wanderers (R)	20	0	1	19	11	127	−116	1	Relegation from FA Women's National League.

Source: FA Full-Time
Rules for classification: 1) Points; 2) Goal difference; 3) Number of goals scored
(C) Champions; (P) Promoted; (R) Relegated

==== Division One South East ====
Pos	Team	Pld	W	D	L	GF	GA	GD	Pts	Promotion or relegation
1	Crawley Wasps (C, P)	22	19	2	1	88	11	+77	59	Promotion to the Southern Premier Division
2	Billericay Town	22	15	3	4	54	29	+25	48	
3	Enfield Town	22	10	5	7	41	29	+12	35	
4	Actonians	22	10	3	9	58	53	+5	33	
5	Leyton Orient	22	9	5	8	39	37	+2	32	
6	AFC Wimbledon	22	9	5	8	36	39	−3	32	
7	Ipswich Town	22	7	7	8	39	42	−3	28	
8	Cambridge United	22	7	6	9	32	35	−3	27	
9	Stevenage	22	8	3	11	29	50	−21	27	
10	Norwich City	22	6	3	13	34	54	−20	21	
11	Denham United (R)	22	3	7	12	15	53	−38	16	Relegation from the National League.
12	Luton Town (R)	22	3	3	16	19	52	−33	12	Relegation from the National League.

Source: FA Full-Time
Rules for classification: 1) Points; 2) Goal difference; 3) Number of goals scored
(C) Champions; (P) Promoted; (R) Relegated

==== Division One South West ====
Pos	Team	Pld	W	D	L	GF	GA	GD	Pts	Promotion or relegation
1	Keynsham Town (C, P)	20	17	2	1	115	15	+100	53	Promotion to the Southern Premier Division
2	Southampton Women's	20	15	1	4	68	16	+52	46	
3	Cheltenham Town	20	12	5	3	54	26	+28	41	
4	Buckland Athletic	19	12	3	4	62	36	+26	39	
5	Chesham United	20	11	2	7	57	38	+19	35	
6	Larkhall Athletic	20	7	6	7	38	43	−5	27	
7	Brislington	20	6	4	10	39	62	−23	22	
8	Southampton Saints	19	6	0	13	23	53	−30	18	Club disbanded at the end of the season
9	Swindon Town	20	4	3	13	18	52	−34	15	
10	Maidenhead United	20	2	2	16	14	71	−57	8	
11	Poole Town	20	2	2	16	21	97	−76	8	
12	St Nicholas (X)	0	0	0	0	0	0	0	0	Club withdrew from the league

Source: FA Full-Time
Rules for classification: 1) Points; 2) Goal difference; 3) Number of goals scored
(C) Champions; (P) Promoted; (X) ?

=== FA Women's Cup ===
==== Final ====
4 May 2019
17:30 BST

Manchester City	3–0	West Ham United
Walsh 52'; Stanway 81'; Hemp 88'	Report

Wembley Stadium, London
Attendance: 43,264
Referee: Abigail Byrne (Suffolk)

=== FA Women's League Cup ===
==== Final ====
23 February 2019
12:15 GMT (UTC+00:00)

Arsenal	0–0 (a.e.t.)	Manchester City
	Report
Penalties
Little (penalty scored); Williamson (penalty missed); Van de Donk (penalty missed); Bloodworth (penalty scored)	2–4	(penalty scored) Stanway; (penalty missed) Hemp; (penalty scored) Emslie; (penalty scored) Houghton; (penalty scored) Beckie

Bramall Lane, Sheffield
Attendance: 2,424
Referee: Lucy Oliver

== Managerial changes ==
This is a list of changes of managers within English league football:

Team	Outgoing manager	Manner of departure	Date of departure	Position in table	Incoming manager	Date of appointment
Ipswich Town	Bryan Klug	End of caretaker spell	30 May 2018	Pre-season	Paul Hurst	30 May 2018
Shrewsbury Town	Paul Hurst	Signed by Ipswich Town	30 May 2018	Pre-season	John Askey	1 June 2018
Macclesfield Town	John Askey	Signed by Shrewsbury Town	1 June 2018	Pre-season	Mark Yates	19 June 2018
Exeter City	Paul Tisdale	End of contract	1 June 2018	Pre-season	Matt Taylor	1 June 2018
Leeds United	Paul Heckingbottom	Sacked	1 June 2018	Pre-season	Marcelo Bielsa	15 June 2018
Doncaster Rovers	Darren Ferguson	Resigned	4 June 2018	Pre-season	Grant McCann	27 June 2018
Oldham Athletic	Richie Wellens	Sacked	8 June 2018	Pre-season	Frankie Bunn	13 June 2018
Chelsea	Antonio Conte	Sacked	13 July 2018	Pre-season	Maurizio Sarri	14 July 2018
Blackpool	Gary Bowyer	Resigned	6 August 2018	12th	Terry McPhillips	10 September 2018
Cheltenham Town	Gary Johnson	Sacked	21 August 2018		Michael Duff	10 September 2018
Scunthorpe United	Nick Daws	Sacked	22 August 2018	18th	Stuart McCall	27 September 2018
Notts County	Kevin Nolan	Sacked	26 August 2018	12th	Harry Kewell	31 August 2018
Crawley Town	Harry Kewell	Signed by Notts County	31 August 2018	14th	Gabriele Cioffi	7 September 2018
Bradford City	Michael Collins	Sacked	3 September 2018	17th	David Hopkin	4 September 2018
Northampton Town	Dean Austin	Sacked	30 September 2018	20th	Keith Curle	1 October 2018
Aston Villa	Steve Bruce	Sacked	3 October 2018	12th	Dean Smith	10 October 2018
Macclesfield Town	Mark Yates	Sacked	8 October 2018	24th	Sol Campbell	27 November 2018
Brentford	Dean Smith	Signed by Aston Villa	10 October 2018	24th	Thomas Frank	16 October 2018
Ipswich Town	Paul Hurst	Sacked	25 October 2018	24th	Paul Lambert	27 October 2018
Fulham	Slaviša Jokanović	Sacked	14 November 2018	20th	Claudio Ranieri	14 November 2018
Southampton	Mark Hughes	Sacked	3 December 2018	18th	Ralph Hasenhüttl	5 December 2018
Manchester United	José Mourinho	Sacked	18 December 2018	6th	Ole Gunnar Solskjær (caretaker)	19 December 2018
Birmingham City W.F.C.	Marc Skinner	Signed by Orlando Pride	14 January 2019	4th	Marta Tejedor	21 January 2019
Huddersfield Town	David Wagner	Mutual consent	14 January 2019	20th	Mark Hudson (caretaker)	14 January 2019
Leicester City	Claude Puel	Sacked	24 January 2019	12th	Brendan Rodgers	26 February 2019
Fulham	Claudio Ranieri	Sacked	28 January 2019	19th	Scott Parker (caretaker)	28 February 2019

== New clubs ==
- Ossett United F.C. join the 2018–19 Northern Premier League Division One East.

== Clubs removed ==
- Jarrow Roofing Boldon Community Association F.C. were closed down after relegation from the 2017–18 Northern Football League First Division (level 9).
- North Ferriby United A.F.C. wound up in March due to outstanding debts whilst playing in the Northern Premier League (level 7).
- Ossett Albion A.F.C. merged with Ossett Town to become Ossett United after competing in the 2017–18 Northern Premier League First Division North (level 8).
- Shaw Lane A.F.C. folded after finishing sixth in the Northern Premier League (level 7).
- Team Northumbria F.C. resigned after completing the 2017–18 Northern Football League First Division (level 9).
- Thurrock F.C. dissolved after competing in the 2017–18 Isthmian League Premier Division (level 7).

== Deaths ==
- 1 June 2018: Ryan Evans, 18, Mansfield Town forward.
- 2 June 2018: John Ritchie, 70, Bradford City goalkeeper.
- 4 June 2018: Gareth Williams, 76, Cardiff City, Bolton Wanderers and Bury midfielder.
- 4 June 2018: Chris Weller, 78, Bournemouth and Bristol Rovers inside forward.
- 10 June 2018: Stan Anderson, 85, England, Newcastle United, Sunderland and Middlesbrough midfielder, who also managed Middlesbrough, Queens Park Rangers, Doncaster Rovers and Bolton Wanderers.
- 11 June 2018: John Shepherd, 86, Millwall, Brighton & Hove Albion and Gillingham centre forward.
- 18 June 2018: Ron Healey, 65, Republic of Ireland, Manchester City and Cardiff City goalkeeper.
- 20 June 2018: Ernie Hunt, 75, Swindon Town, Wolverhampton Wanderers, Everton, Coventry City, Doncaster Rovers and Bristol City forward.
- 21 June 2018: Johnny Hubbard, MBE, 87, South Africa and Bury midfielder.
- 28 June 2018: Goran Bunjevčević, 45, FR Yugoslavia and Tottenham Hotspur defender
- 8 July 2018: Alan Gilzean, 79, Tottenham Hotspur forward.
- 23 July 2018: Paul Madeley, 73, England and Leeds United defender.
- 24 July 2018: Reginald Pickup, 88, Stoke City inside left.
- 24 July 2018: Fred Donaldson, 81, Port Vale, Exeter City and Chester right-back.
- 25 July 2018: Jimmy Collins, 80, Tottenham Hotspur and Brighton & Hove Albion inside forward.
- 3 August 2018: Terry Bush, 75, Bristol City forward.
- 3 August 2018: Cliff Huxford, 81, Chelsea, Southampton and Exeter City wing half.
- 6 August 2018: Dennis Thrower, 80, Ipswich Town wing half.
- 8 August 2018: Dave Hargreaves, 63, Blackburn Rovers striker, who also holds the overall goalscoring record for Accrington Stanley.
- 20 August 2018: Jimmy McIlroy MBE, 86, Northern Ireland, Burnley, Stoke City and Oldham Athletic forward, who also managed Oldham and Bolton Wanderers.
- 23 August 2018: Ron Hunt, 72, Queens Park Rangers defender.
- 23 August 2018: Ted Bennett, 93, Great Britain, Queens Park Rangers and Watford goalkeeper.
- 24 August 2018: Gordon Riddick, 74, Luton Town, Gillingham and Brentford midfielder.
- 27 August 2018: Ron Newman, 82, Portsmouth, Leyton Orient, Crystal Palace and Gillingham outside forward.
- 11 September 2018: Edwin Davies, 72, Bolton Wanderers former owner and honorary president.
- 12 September 2018: Ralph Prouton, 92, Swindon Town left half.
- 16 September 2018: Kevin Beattie, 64, England, Ipswich Town, Colchester United and Middlesbrough defender.
- 16 September 2018: Tommy Best, 97, Chester, Cardiff City and Queens Park Rangers forward.
- 18 September 2018: Ernie Bateman, 89, Watford centre half.
- 23 September 2018: Harry Walden, 77, Luton Town and Northampton Town midfielder.
- 24 September 2018: Jim Brogan, 74, Scotland and Coventry City left back.
- 26 September 2018: Joe Carolan, 81, Republic of Ireland, Manchester United and Brighton & Hove Albion left back.
- 9 October 2018: Tony Hopper, 42, Carlisle United midfielder.
- 11 October 2018: Sir Doug Ellis, OBE, 94, Aston Villa chairman for 24 years and life president of the club.
- 15 October 2018: Charlie Crickmore, 76, Hull City, Bournemouth, Gillingham, Rotherham United, Norwich City and Notts County winger.
- 17 October 2018: Geoff Scott, 61, Stoke City, Leicester City, Birmingham City, Charlton Athletic, Middlesbrough, Northampton Town and Cambridge United defender.
- 27 October 2018: Vichai Srivaddhanaprabha, 60, Leicester City owner and chairman.
- 31 October 2018: Ken Shellito, 78, England and Chelsea full back, who also managed Chelsea and Cambridge United.
- 9 November 2018: Roger Hoy, 71, Tottenham Hotspur, Crystal Palace, Luton Town and Cardiff City defender.
- 13 November 2018: David Stewart, 71, Scotland, Leeds United and Swansea City goalkeeper.
- 17 November 2018: Barrie Betts, 86, Barnsley, Stockport County, Manchester City and Scunthorpe United defender.
- 17 November 2018: Jim Iley, 82, Sheffield United, Tottenham Hotspur, Nottingham Forest, Newcastle United and Peterborough United left half, who also managed Peterborough, Barnsley, Blackburn Rovers, Bury and Exeter City.
- 19 November 2018: George Yardley, 76, Luton Town and Tranmere Rovers goalkeeper/forward.
- 20 November 2018: Gordon Morritt, 76, Rotherham United, Doncaster Rovers, Northampton Town, York City, Rochdale and Darlington goalkeeper.
- 23 November 2018: Kevin Austin, 45, Trinidad & Tobago, Leyton Orient, Lincoln City, Barnsley, Cambridge United, Bristol Rovers, Swansea City and Chesterfield defender.
- 25 November 2018: Graham Williams, 81, Wales, Bradford City, Everton, Swansea City, Wrexham, Tranmere Rovers and Port Vale winger.
- 26 November 2018: Johnny Hart, 90, Manchester City inside forward, who also managed the club.
- 26 November 2018: Darren Pitcher, 49, Charlton Athletic and Crystal Palace midfielder.
- 15 December 2018: Dušan Nikolić, 65, Yugoslavia and Bolton Wanderers midfielder.
- 18 December 2018: Bill Slater CBE , 91, England, Great Britain, Blackpool, Brentford and Wolverhampton Wanderers inside forward.
- 20 December 2018: Colin Barlow, 83, Manchester City, Oldham Athletic and Doncaster Rovers winger.
- 26 December 2018: Mike Metcalf, 79, Wrexham and Chester striker.
- 27 December 2018: Brian Jordan, 86, Rotherham United, Middlesbrough and York City half back.
- 28 December 2018: Peter Hill-Wood, 82, Arsenal chairman for over thirty years between 1982 and 2013.
- 31 December 2018: Peter Thompson, 76, England, Preston North End, Liverpool and Bolton Wanderers winger.
- 3 January 2019: Reg Holland, 78, Wrexham and Chester full back.
- 13 January 2019: Phil Masinga, 49, South Africa and Leeds United striker.
- 14 January 2019: Duncan Welbourne, 78, Grimsby Town, Watford and Southport full back.
- 21 January 2019: Emiliano Sala, 28, Cardiff City striker.
- 24 January 2019: Nigel Saddington, 53, Doncaster Rovers, Sunderland and Carlisle United defender.
- 24 January 2019: Johnny Walker, 90, Wolverhampton Wanderers, Southampton and Reading inside forward.
- 27 January 2019: Mike Harrison, 78, Chelsea, Blackburn Rovers, Plymouth Argyle and Luton Town winger.
- 28 January 2019: Arthur Turner, 98, Charlton Athletic and Colchester United forward.
- 31 January 2019: Dennis Hunt, 81, Gillingham and Brentford left back.
- 3 February 2019: Danny Williams, 94, Rotherham United inside forward, who also managed Rotherham, Swindon Town, Sheffield Wednesday and Mansfield Town.
- 4 February 2019: Matt Brazier, 42, Queens Park Rangers, Fulham, Cardiff City and Leyton Orient midfielder.
- 5 February 2019: Joe Fascione, 74, Chelsea winger.
- 8 February 2019: Cliff Myers, 72, Charlton Athletic, Brentford and Torquay United utility player.
- 9 February 2019: Mick Kennedy, 57, Republic of Ireland, Halifax Town, Huddersfield Town, Middlesbrough, Portsmouth, Bradford City, Leicester City, Luton Town, Stoke City, Chesterfield and Wigan Athletic midfielder.
- 9 February 2019: Fred Pickering, 78, England, Blackburn Rovers, Everton, Birmingham City and Blackpool forward.
- 9 February 2019: Ian Ross, 72, Liverpool, Aston Villa, Peterborough United and Hereford United defender, who also managed Huddersfield Town.
- 12 February 2019: Gordon Banks, OBE, 81, England, Chesterfield, Leicester City and Stoke City goalkeeper, part of England's World Cup winning team of 1966.
- 13 February 2019: Eric Harrison, MBE, 81, Halifax Town, Hartlepools United, Barrow and Southport wing half, who later became a prominent youth coach at Manchester United.
- 26 February 2019: Bobby Doyle, 65, Barnsley, Peterborough United, Blackpool, Portsmouth and Hull City midfielder.
- 28 February 2019: Peter Dolby, 78, Shrewsbury Town centre half.
- 15 March 2019: Derek Lewin, 88, Great Britain Olympian who played for Oldham Athletic in the Football League.
- 15 March 2019: Ron Peplow, 83, Brentford wing half.
- 15 March 2019: Michael Thalassitis, 26, Stevenage striker.
- c.21 March 2019: John Steeples, 59, Grimsby Town forward.
- 25 March 2019: Barrie Hole, 76, Wales, Cardiff City, Blackburn Rovers, Aston Villa and Swansea City midfielder.
- 26 March 2019: Ted Burgin, 91, Sheffield United, Doncaster Rovers, Leeds United and Rochdale goalkeeper.
- 28 March 2019: Kevin Randall, 73, Bury, Chesterfield, Notts County, Mansfield Town and York City striker, who also managed York City and Chesterfield and coached at a number of clubs.
- April 2019: Kit Napier, 75, Blackpool, Preston North End, Workington, Newcastle United, Brighton & Hove Albion and Blackburn Rovers forward.
- 12 April 2019: Ivor Broadis, 96, England, Carlisle United, Sunderland, Manchester City and Newcastle United inside forward, who also managed Carlisle United.
- 12 April 2019: Tommy Smith, MBE, 74, England, Liverpool and Swansea City defender.
- 14 April 2019: Colin Collindridge, 98, Sheffield United, Nottingham Forest and Coventry City forward.
- 22 April 2019: Billy McNeill, MBE, 79, first British captain to lift the European Cup in 1967, he later managed Manchester City and Aston Villa.
- 23 April 2019: George Haigh, 103, Stockport County defender.
- 23 April 2019: Peter Skipper, 61, Hull City, Darlington, Oldham Athletic, Walsall, Wrexham and Wigan Athletic defender.
- 10 May 2019: Gordon Neate, 78, Reading full back, who later served the club as groundsman.
- 11 May 2019: Jon Gittens, 55, Southampton, Swindon Town, Middlesbrough, Portsmouth, Torquay United and Exeter City defender.
- 11 May 2019: Alan Skirton, 80, Arsenal, Blackpool, Bristol City and Torquay United winger.
- 16 May 2019: Geoff Toseland, 87, Sunderland winger.
- 26 May 2019: Harry Hood, 74, Sunderland forward.
- 27 May 2019: Alan Smith, 97, Arsenal, Brentford and Leyton Orient outside left.
- 1 June 2019: José Antonio Reyes, 35, Arsenal winger.

== Retirements ==
- 27 July 2018: Carl Ikeme, 32, former Nigeria and Wolverhampton Wanderers goalkeeper.
- 30 July 2018: Liam Rosenior, 34, former Bristol City, Fulham, Reading, Hull City and Brighton & Hove Albion full back.
- 31 July 2018: Jon Meades, 26, former Cardiff City, Bournemouth, Oxford United and A.F.C. Wimbledon defender.
- 16 August 2018: Henri Camara, 41, former Senegal, Wolverhampton Wanderers, Southampton, Wigan Athletic, West Ham United, Stoke City and Sheffield United striker.
- 22 August 2018: Steve Sidwell, 35, former Brentford, Reading, Chelsea, Aston Villa, Fulham, Stoke City and Brighton & Hove Albion midfielder.
- 24 August 2018: Grant Holt, 37, former Halifax Town, Sheffield Wednesday, Rochdale, Nottingham Forest, Blackpool, Shrewsbury Town, Norwich City, Wigan Athletic, Aston Villa, Huddersfield Town, Wolverhampton Wanderers, King's Lynn Town and Barrow striker.
- 28 August 2018: Luke Wilkshire, 36, former Australia, Middlesbrough and Bristol City defender.
- 29 August 2018: Clint Dempsey, 35, former United States, Fulham and Tottenham Hotspur forward.
- 6 September 2018: Abdoul Camara, 28, former Guinea and Derby County winger.
- 12 September 2018: Lenny Pidgeley, 34, former Chelsea, Millwall, Carlisle United, Bradford City, Exeter City and Newport County goalkeeper.
- 18 September 2018: Stephen Darby, 29, former Liverpool, Bradford City and Bolton Wanderers defender.
- 20 September 2018: Graham Stack, 36, former Arsenal, Reading, Plymouth Argyle, Barnet and Eastleigh goalkeeper.
- 7 October 2018: John Terry, 37, former England, Chelsea and Aston Villa defender.
- 16 October 2018: Zander Diamond, 33, former Oldham Athletic, Burton Albion, Northampton Town and Mansfield Town defender.
- 17 October 2018: David Cotterill, 30, former Wales, Bristol City, Wigan Athletic, Sheffield United, Swansea City, Barnsley, Doncaster Rovers and Birmingham City winger.
- 25 October 2018: Robin van Persie, 36, former Netherlands, Arsenal and Manchester United striker.
- 13 November 2018: Joe Cole, 37, former England, West Ham United, Chelsea, Liverpool, Aston Villa and Coventry City midfielder.
- 21 November 2018: Didier Drogba, 40, former Ivory Coast and Chelsea striker.
- 26 November 2018: Leon Barnett, 32, former Luton Town, West Bromwich Albion, Norwich City, Wigan Athletic, Bury and Northampton Town defender.
- 3 December 2018: Andrey Arshavin, 37, former Russia and Arsenal midfielder.
- 5 January 2019: Brian Stock, 37, former Wales, AFC Bournemouth, Preston North End, Doncaster Rovers, Burnley and Havant & Waterlooville midfielder.
- 7 January 2019: Adrian Leijer, 32, former Australia and Norwich City defender.
- 11 January 2019: Robert Huth, 34, former Germany, Chelsea, Middlesbrough, Stoke City and Leicester City defender.
- 21 January 2019: Glen Johnson, 34, former England, West Ham United, Chelsea, Portsmouth, Liverpool and Stoke City right back.
- 30 January 2019: Kalifa Cissé, 35, former Mali, Reading, Bristol City and Derby County defender.
- 4 February 2019: Zavon Hines, 30, former West Ham United, Burnley, Bradford City, Dagenham & Redbridge, Southend United and Chesterfield winger.
- 5 February 2019: Joe Thompson, 29, former Rochdale, Tranmere Rovers, Bury and Carlisle United midfielder.
- 7 February 2019: Chris Baird, 36, former Northern Ireland, Southampton, Fulham, Reading, Burnley, West Bromwich Albion and Derby County defender/midfielder.
- 25 February 2019: Abou Diaby, 32, former France and Arsenal midfielder.
- 25 February 2019: Andrea Orlandi, 34, former Swansea City, Brighton & Hove Albion and Blackpool midfielder.
- 8 March 2019: Emmanuel Frimpong, 27, former Ghana, Arsenal and Barnsley midfielder.
- 22 March 2019: Jonathan Walters, 35, former Republic of Ireland, Bolton Wanderers, Hull City, Wrexham, Chester City, Ipswich Town, Stoke City and Burnley forward.
- 22 March 2019: Fraser Franks, 28, former AFC Wimbledon, Welling United, Luton Town, Stevenage and Newport County defender.
- 27 March 2019: Gabriel Agbonlahor, 32, former England and Aston Villa striker.
- 28 March 2019: Tim Cahill, 39, former Australia, Millwall and Everton forward/midfielder.
- 11 April 2019: Yossi Benayoun, 38, former Israel, West Ham United, Liverpool, Chelsea, Arsenal and Queens Park Rangers midfielder.
- 4 May 2019: Danny Grainger, 32, former Carlisle United left back.
- 4 May 2019: Matthew Taylor, 37, former Luton Town, Portsmouth, Bolton Wanderers, West Ham United, Burnley, Northampton Town and Swindon Town midfielder.
- 5 May 2019: John O'Shea, 38, former Republic of Ireland, Manchester United, Sunderland and Reading defender.
- 7 May 2019: Darren O'Dea, 32, former Republic of Ireland and Blackpool defender.
- 10 May 2019: Yaya Toure, 35, former Ivory Coast and Manchester City midfielder.
- 12 May 2019: Bruno, 38, former Brighton & Hove Albion right back.
- 16 May 2019: David Mirfin, 34, former Huddersfield Town, Scunthorpe United, Watford and Mansfield Town centre half.
- 25 May 2019: David Pipe, 35, former Wales, Coventry City, Notts County and Newport County midfielder.
- 27 May 2019: Ashley Cole, 38, former England, Arsenal, Chelsea and Derby County left back.
- 29 May 2019: Petr Čech, 36, former Czech Republic, Chelsea and Arsenal goalkeeper.
- 31 May 2019: Robert Green, 39, former England, Norwich City, West Ham United, Queens Park Rangers and Leeds United goalkeeper.
