= 2018–19 in Croatian football =

Football in Croatia
- Season: 2018–19

Men's football
- Prva HNL: Dinamo Zagreb
- Druga HNL: Varaždin
- Treća HNL: Cibalia (North); Vinogradar (West); Junak (South)
- Croatian Cup: Rijeka

The following article presents a summary of the 2018–19 football season in Croatia, which will be the 28th season of competitive football in the country.

== National teams ==
=== Croatia ===
Date	Venue	Opponents	Score	Croatia scorer(s)	Report
2018 FIFA World Cup - Group stage
16 June 2018	Kaliningrad Stadium, Kaliningrad	Nigeria	2–0	Etebo (o.g.), Modrić	FIFA.com
21 June 2018	Nizhny Novgorod Stadium, Nizhny Novgorod	Argentina	3–0	Rebić, Modrić, Rakitić	FIFA.com
26 June 2018	Rostov Arena, Rostov-on-Don	Iceland	2–1	Badelj, Perišić	FIFA.com
2018 FIFA World Cup - Knockout stage
1 July 2018	Nizhny Novgorod Stadium, Nizhny Novgorod	Denmark	1–1 (3–2 p)	Mandžukić	FIFA.com
7 July 2018	Fisht Olympic Stadium, Sochi	Russia	2–2 (4–3 p)	Kramarić, Vida	FIFA.com
11 July 2018	Luzhniki Stadium, Moscow	England	2–1 (a.e.t.)	Perišić, Mandžukić	FIFA.com
15 July 2018	Luzhniki Stadium, Moscow	France	2–4	Perišić, Mandžukić	FIFA.com
2018–19 UEFA Nations League A - Group stage
11 September 2018	Estadio Manuel Martínez Valero, Elche	Spain	0–6		UEFA.com
12 October 2018	Stadion Rujevica, Rijeka	England	0–0		UEFA.com
15 November 2018	Stadion Maksimir, Zagreb	Spain	3–2	Kramarić, Jedvaj (2)	UEFA.com
18 November 2018	Wembley Stadium, London	England	1–2	Kramarić	UEFA.com
UEFA Euro 2020 qualifying - Group stage
21 March 2019	Stadion Maksimir, Zagreb	Azerbaijan	2–1	Barišić, Kramarić	UEFA.com
24 March 2019	Groupama Arena, Budapest	Hungary	1–2	Rebić	UEFA.com
8 June 2019	Stadion Gradski vrt, Osijek	Wales	2–1	Lawrence (o.g.), Perišić	UEFA.com
Friendly fixtures
6 September 2018	Estádio do Algarve, Loulé	Portugal	1–1	Perišić	
15 October 2018	Stadion Rujevica, Rijeka	Jordan	2–1	Vida, Mitrović	
11 June 2019	Stadion Varteks, Varaždin	Tunisia	1–2	Petković	

=== Croatia U21 ===
Date	Venue	Opponents	Score	Croatia scorer(s)	Report
2019 UEFA European Under-21 Championship qualification - Group stage
10 September 2018	Neman Stadium, Grodno	Belarus	4–0	Jakoliš, Šunjić, Halilović, Brekalo	UEFA.com
12 October 2018	Stadion Aldo Drosina, Pula	Greece	2–0	Pasalidis (o.g.), Brekalo	UEFA.com
15 October 2018	San Marino Stadium, Serravalle	San Marino	4–0	Halilović, Vlašić, Uremović, Bosančić	UEFA.com
Friendly fixtures
15 November 2018	Stade Pierre Brisson, Beauvais	France	2–2	Halilović, Uremović	
25 March 2019	Stadio Benito Stirpe, Frosinone	Italy	2–2	Halilović, Kalaica	
12 June 2019	Stadion Aldo Drosina, Pula	Denmark	1–0	Bašić	

=== Croatia U19 ===
Date	Venue	Opponents	Score	Croatia scorer(s)	Report
2019 UEFA European Under-19 Championship qualification - Qualifying round
14 November 2018	SK Hanácká Slavia Kroměříž, Kroměříž	North Macedonia	1–1	Šutalo	UEFA.com
17 November 2018	Letná Stadion, Zlín	Luxembourg	2–1	Marin, Palaversa	UEFA.com
20 November 2018	Letná Stadion, Zlín	Czech Republic	2–2	Šego, Palaversa	UEFA.com
2019 UEFA European Under-19 Championship qualification - Elite round
20 March 2019	Gradski stadion, Sinj	Germany	1–2	Blagaić	UEFA.com
23 March 2019	Stadion Hrvatski vitezovi, Dugopolje	Hungary	2–0	Šutalo, Marin	UEFA.com
26 March 2019	Gradski stadion, Sinj	Norway	2–3	Šutalo, Palaversa	UEFA.com

=== Croatia U17 ===
Date	Venue	Opponents	Score	Croatia scorer(s)	Report
2019 UEFA European Under-17 Championship qualification - Qualifying round
27 October 2018	Gradski stadion, Sinj	Armenia	3–0	Vasilj, Biuk, Groznica	UEFA.com
30 October 2018	Stadion Hrvatski vitezovi, Dugopolje	Andorra	3–0	Vasilj (2), Sučić	UEFA.com
2 November 2018	Gradski stadion, Sinj	Italy	0–3		UEFA.com
2019 UEFA European Under-17 Championship qualification - Elite round
21 March 2019	Silkeborg Stadium, Silkeborg	Denmark	3–2	Jurčec, Groznica, Gvardiol	UEFA.com
24 March 2019	Silkeborg Stadium, Silkeborg	England	0–0		UEFA.com
27 March 2019	Vorup Stadion, Randers	Switzerland	1–1	Branšteter	UEFA.com

=== Croatia Women's ===
Date	Venue	Opponents	Score	Croatia scorer(s)	Report
2019 FIFA Women's World Cup qualification - Group stage
30 August 2018	Viborg Stadium, Viborg	Denmark	1–1	Lojna	UEFA.com

=== Croatia Women's U19 ===
Date	Venue	Opponents	Score	Croatia scorer(s)	Report
2019 UEFA Women's Under-19 Championship qualification - Qualifying round
1 October 2018	Stadion NK Podravina, Ludbreg	Slovakia	0–6		UEFA.com
4 October 2018	SRC Trate, Nedelišće	England	0–8		UEFA.com
7 October 2018	Stadion NK Podravina, Ludbreg	Malta	0–0		UEFA.com

=== Croatia Women's U17 ===
Date	Venue	Opponents	Score	Croatia scorer(s)	Report
2019 UEFA Women's Under-17 Championship qualification - Qualifying round
19 October 2018	Stadion Veli Jože, Poreč	Russia	0–1		UEFA.com
22 October 2018	Stadion Valbruna, Rovinj	Norway	0–4		UEFA.com
25 October 2018	Stadion Veli Jože, Poreč	Israel	1–0	Petarić	UEFA.com

== League tables ==
=== Croatian First Football League ===
Pos	Team	Pld	W	D	L	GF	GA	GD	Pts	Qualification or relegation
1	Dinamo Zagreb (C)	36	29	5	2	74	20	+54	92	Qualification for the Champions League second qualifying round
2	Rijeka	36	19	10	7	70	36	+34	67	Qualification for the Europa League third qualifying round (Note: Rijeka qualified for the Europa League third qualifying round by winning the 2018–19 Croatian Football Cup. As a result, the spot awarded to the runners-up (Europa League second qualifying round) was passed to the third-placed team, and the spot awarded to the third-placed team (Europa League first qualifying round) was passed to the fourth-placed team.)
3	Osijek	36	18	8	10	61	36	+25	62 (Note: Head-to-head points: Osijek 7 pts, Hajduk Split 4 pts.)	Qualification for the Europa League second qualifying round
4	Hajduk Split	36	17	11	8	59	39	+20	62	Qualification for the Europa League first qualifying round
5	Gorica	36	17	8	11	57	46	+11	59	
6	Lokomotiva	36	13	10	13	51	43	+8	49	
7	Slaven Belupo	36	7	16	13	41	53	−12	37	
8	Inter Zaprešić	36	9	4	23	40	84	−44	31	
9	Istra 1961 (O)	36	6	7	23	31	73	−42	25	Qualification for the Relegation play-offs
10	Rudeš (R)	36	3	5	28	26	80	−54	14	Relegation to Croatian Second Football League

Source: PrvaHNL.hr
Rules for classification: 1) Points; 2) Head-to-head points; 3) Head-to-head goal difference; 4) Head-to-head goals scored (at home if two teams tied); 5) Goal difference; 6) Goals scored; 7) Play-off
(Note: Criteria 2-4 and 7 is only used if deciding champion, teams to international competition or teams for relegation and in that case criteria 6 will not be used).
(C) Champions; (O) Play-off winners; (R) Relegated

=== Croatian Second Football League ===
Pos	Team	Pld	W	D	L	GF	GA	GD	Pts	Qualification or relegation (Note: Dinamo Zagreb II, Hajduk Split II and Osijek II are ineligible for promotion)
1	Varaždin (C, P)	26	16	3	7	40	30	+10	51	Promotion to the Croatian First Football League
2	Šibenik	26	13	7	6	38	25	+13	46	Qualification to the promotion play-off
3	Osijek II	26	13	5	8	37	26	+11	44	Reserve teams are ineligible for promotion to the Croatian First Football League
4	Hajduk Split II	26	12	7	7	36	29	+7	43	Reserve teams are ineligible for promotion to the Croatian First Football League
5	Dugopolje	26	13	4	9	29	26	+3	43	
6	Sesvete	26	11	7	8	38	26	+12	40	
7	Dinamo Zagreb II	26	10	7	9	31	26	+5	37	Reserve teams are ineligible for promotion to the Croatian First Football League
8	Zadar (R)	26	9	7	10	36	40	−4	34	Relegation to the Croatian Third Football League
9	BSK Bijelo Brdo	26	6	10	10	31	37	−6	28	
10	Solin	26	5	13	8	24	31	−7	28	
11	Kustošija	26	7	7	12	20	28	−8	28	
12	Hrvatski Dragovoljac	26	7	6	13	23	29	−6	27	
13	Međimurje	26	6	7	13	26	42	−16	25	
14	Lučko (R)	26	6	6	14	16	31	−15	24	Relegation to the Croatian Third Football League

Source: Druga-HNL.com
Rules for classification: 1) Points; 2) Head-to-head points; 3) Head-to-head goal difference; 4) Head-to-head goals scored (at home if two teams tied); 5) Goal difference; 6) Goals scored; 7) Play-off
(Note: Criteria 2-4 and 7 is only used if deciding champion, teams for promotion or relegation and in that case criteria 6 will not be used).
(C) Champions; (P) Promoted; (R) Relegated

== Croatian clubs in Europe ==
=== Summary ===
Club	Competition	Starting round	Final round	Matches played
Dinamo Zagreb	Champions League	2nd qualifying round	Play-off round	6
Dinamo Zagreb	Europa League	Group stage	Round of 16	10
Rijeka	Europa League	3rd qualifying round		2
Hajduk Split	Europa League	2nd qualifying round	3rd qualifying round	4
Osijek	Europa League	1st qualifying round	2nd qualifying round	4
Osijek	Women's Champions League	Qualifying round		3
Dinamo Zagreb U19	UEFA Youth League	First round	Quarter-finals	7

=== Dinamo Zagreb ===
Date	Venue	Opponents	Score	Dinamo Zagreb scorer(s)	Report
2018–19 Champions League - Second qualifying round
24 July 2018	Stadion Maksimir, Zagreb	(Israel) Hapoel Be'er Sheva	5–0	Hajrović, Oršić, Ademi (2), Hodžić	UEFA.com
31 July 2018	Turner Stadium, Be'er Sheva	(Israel) Hapoel Be'er Sheva	2–2	Budimir, Hajrović	UEFA.com
2018–19 Champions League - Third qualifying round
7 August 2018	Astana Arena, Astana	(Kazakhstan) Astana	2–0	Budimir, Olmo	UEFA.com
14 August 2018	Stadion Maksimir, Zagreb	(Kazakhstan) Astana	1–0	Gavranović	UEFA.com
2018–19 Champions League - Play-off round
22 August 2018	Stade de Suisse, Bern	(Switzerland) Young Boys	1–1	Oršić	UEFA.com
28 August 2018	Stadion Maksimir, Zagreb	(Switzerland) Young Boys	1–2	Hajrović	UEFA.com
2018–19 UEFA Europa League - Group stage
20 September 2018	Stadion Maksimir, Zagreb	(Turkey) Fenerbahçe	4–1	Šunjić, Hajrović (2), Olmo	UEFA.com
4 October 2018	Constant Vanden Stock Stadium, Anderlecht	(Belgium) Anderlecht	2–0	Hajrović, Gojak	UEFA.com
25 October 2018	Štadión Antona Malatinského, Trnava	(Slovakia) Spartak Trnava	2–1	Gavranović, Oršić	UEFA.com
8 November 2018	Stadion Maksimir, Zagreb	(Slovakia) Spartak Trnava	3–1	Gojak, Kadlec (o.g.), Oršić	UEFA.com
29 November 2018	Şükrü Saracoğlu Stadium, Istanbul	(Turkey) Fenerbahçe	0–0		UEFA.com
13 December 2018	Stadion Maksimir, Zagreb	(Belgium) Anderlecht	0–0		UEFA.com
2018–19 UEFA Europa League - Round of 32
14 February 2019	Doosan Arena, Plzeň	(Czech Republic) Viktoria Plzeň	1–2	Olmo	UEFA.com
21 February 2019	Stadion Maksimir, Zagreb	(Czech Republic) Viktoria Plzeň	3–0	Oršić, Dilaver, Petković	UEFA.com
2018–19 UEFA Europa League - Round of 16
7 March 2019	Stadion Maksimir, Zagreb	(Portugal) Benfica	1–0	Petković	UEFA.com
14 March 2019	Estádio da Luz, Lisbon	(Portugal) Benfica	0–3 (a.e.t.)		UEFA.com

=== Rijeka ===
Date	Venue	Opponents	Score	Rijeka scorer(s)	Report
2018–19 Europa League - Third qualifying round
9 August 2018	Sarpsborg Stadion, Sarpsborg	(Norway) Sarpsborg 08	1–1	Gorgon	UEFA.com
16 August 2018	Stadion Rujevica, Rijeka	(Norway) Sarpsborg 08	0–1		UEFA.com

=== Hajduk Split ===
Date	Venue	Opponents	Score	Hajduk Split scorer(s)	Report
2018–19 Europa League - Second qualifying round
26 July 2018	Stadion Poljud, Split	(Bulgaria) Slavia Sofia	1–0	Said	UEFA.com
2 August 2018	Vasil Levski National Stadium, Sofia	(Bulgaria) Slavia Sofia	3–2	Jurić, Caktaš (2)	UEFA.com
2018–19 Europa League - Third qualifying round
9 August 2018	Stadion Poljud, Split	(Romania) Steaua București	0–0		UEFA.com
16 August 2018	Arena Națională, Bucharest	(Romania) Steaua București	1–2	Said	UEFA.com

=== Osijek ===
Date	Venue	Opponents	Score	Osijek scorer(s)	Report
2018–19 Europa League - First qualifying round
12 July 2017	Zimbru Stadium, Chișinău	(Moldova) Petrocub Hîncești	1–1	Marić	UEFA.com
19 July 2017	Stadion Gradski vrt, Osijek	(Moldova) Petrocub Hîncești	2–1	Mudražija, Barišić	UEFA.com
2018–19 Europa League - Second qualifying round
26 July 2018	Stadion Gradski vrt, Osijek	(Scotland) Rangers	0–1		UEFA.com
2 August 2018	Ibrox Stadium, Glasgow	(Scotland) Rangers	1–1	Goldson (o.g.)	UEFA.com

=== ŽNK Osijek ===
Date	Venue	Opponents	Score	ŽNK Osijek scorer(s)	Report
2018–19 UEFA Women's Champions League - Qualifying round
7 August 2018	Stadion Gradski vrt, Osijek	(North Macedonia) Dragon 2014	13–0	Andrlić (3), Joščak (2), Bulut, Balić (3), Lojna, Balog (2), Maltašić	UEFA.com
10 August 2018	Stadion Gradski vrt, Osijek	(Portugal) Sporting CP	0–3		UEFA.com
13 August 2018	Stadion Gradski vrt, Osijek	(Norway) Avaldsnes	2–2	Joščak, Šalek	UEFA.com

=== Dinamo Zagreb U19 ===
Date	Venue	Opponents	Score	Dinamo Zagreb U19 scorer(s)	Report
2018–19 UEFA Youth League Domestic Champions Path - First round
2 October 2018	Stadionul Viitorul, Ovidiu	(Romania) Viitorul Constanța	1–0	Ćuže	UEFA.com
23 October 2018	Stadion Hitrec-Kacian, Zagreb	(Romania) Viitorul Constanța	2–0	Leca (o.g.), Ćuže	UEFA.com
2018–19 UEFA Youth League Domestic Champions Path - Second round
7 November 2018	Astana Arena, Astana	(Kazakhstan) Astana	1–1	Šipoš	UEFA.com
27 November 2018	Stadion Hitrec-Kacian, Zagreb	(Kazakhstan) Astana	3–1	Šipoš, Franjić, Kapitanović	UEFA.com
2018–19 UEFA Youth League - Play-offs
19 February 2019	Stadion Hitrec-Kacian, Zagreb	(Russia) Lokomotiv Moscow	1–1 (5–4 p)	Šipoš	UEFA.com
2018–19 UEFA Youth League - Round of 16
12 March 2019	Stadion Hitrec-Kacian, Zagreb	(England) Liverpool	1–1 (4–3 p)	Šipoš	UEFA.com
2018–19 UEFA Youth League - Quarter-finals
3 April 2019	Cobham Training Centre, Cobham	(England) Chelsea	1–1 (2–4 p)	Marin	UEFA.com
