= 2018–19 UEFA Youth League Domestic Champions Path =

Youth football competition

The 2018–19 UEFA Youth League Domestic Champions Path began on 2 October and ended on 28 November 2018. A total of 32 teams competed in the Domestic Champions Path to decide 8 of the 24 places in the knockout phase (play-offs and the round of 16 onwards) of the 2018–19 UEFA Youth League.

Times are CET/CEST, (Note: CEST (UTC+2) for dates up to 27 October 2018 (first round), and CET (UTC+1) for dates thereafter (second round).) as listed by UEFA (local times, if different, are in parentheses).

== Draw ==
The youth domestic champions of the top 32 associations according to their 2017 UEFA country coefficients entered the Domestic Champions Path. If there was a vacancy (associations with no youth domestic competition, as well as youth domestic champions already included in the UEFA Champions League path), it was first filled by the title holders should they had not yet qualified, and then by the youth domestic champions of the next association in the UEFA ranking. For the Domestic Champions Path, the 32 teams were drawn into two rounds of two-legged home-and-away ties. The draw for both the first round and second round was held on 4 September 2018, 14:00 CEST, at the UEFA headquarters in Nyon, Switzerland. There were no seedings, but the 32 teams were split into groups defined by sporting and geographical criteria prior to the draw.

- In the first round, the 32 teams were split into four groups. Teams in the same group were drawn against each other, with the order of legs decided by draw.
- In the second round, the 16 winners of the first round, whose identity was not known at the time of the draw, were split into two groups: Group A contained the winners from Groups 1 and 2, while Group B contained the winners from Groups 3 and 4. Teams in the same group were drawn against each other, with the order of legs decided by draw.

Key to colours
Second round winners advanced to the play-offs

Group 1 Team (France) Montpellier (Ukraine) Dynamo Kyiv (Turkey) Altınordu (Switzerland) Basel (Scotland) Hamilton Academical (Bulgaria) Septemvri Sofia (Slovakia) Žilina (Finland) HJK	Group 2 Team (England) Chelsea (Belgium) Anderlecht (Austria) Flyeralarm Admira (Denmark) Midtjylland (Sweden) IF Elfsborg (Norway) Molde (Iceland) KR (Republic of Ireland) Bohemians	Group 3 Team (Germany) Hertha BSC (Czech Republic) Sigma Olomouc (Greece) PAOK (Poland) Lech Poznań (Cyprus) AEL Limassol (Azerbaijan) Gabala (Slovenia) Maribor (Moldova) Sheriff Tiraspol	Group 4 Team (Russia) Anzhi Makhachkala (Croatia) Dinamo Zagreb (Romania) Viitorul Constanța (Belarus) Minsk (Israel) Maccabi Tel Aviv (Kazakhstan) Astana (Hungary) Illés Akadémia (Albania) Vllaznia

== Format ==
In both rounds, if the aggregate score was tied after full time of the second leg, the away goals rule was used to decide the winner. If still tied, the match was decided by a penalty shoot-out (no extra time was played). The eight second round winners advanced to the play-offs, where they were joined by the eight group runners-up from the UEFA Champions League Path (group stage).

== First round ==
=== Summary ===
The first legs were played on 2, 3 and 4 October 2018, and the second legs on 23 and 24 October 2018.

Team 1	Agg.	Team 2	1st leg	2nd leg
Altınordu (Turkey)	3–2	(Finland) HJK	1–1	2–1
Žilina (Slovakia)	1–7	(France) Montpellier	1–5	0–2
Basel (Switzerland)	4–4 (2–3 p)	(Scotland) Hamilton Academical	2–2	2–2
Dynamo Kyiv (Ukraine)	6–1	(Bulgaria) Septemvri Sofia	1–0	5–1
KR (Iceland)	1–3 (Note: Order of legs reversed after original draw.)	(Sweden) IF Elfsborg	1–2	0–1
Anderlecht (Belgium)	1–1 (a)	(Austria) Flyeralarm Admira	0–0	1–1
Midtjylland (Denmark)	4–2	(Republic of Ireland) Bohemians	2–1	2–1
Chelsea (England)	14–1	(Norway) Molde	10–1	4–0
AEL Limassol (Cyprus)	1–4	(Greece) PAOK	1–2	0–2
Sigma Olomouc (Czech Republic)	7–3	(Slovenia) Maribor	4–1	3–2
Gabala (Azerbaijan)	4–2	(Moldova) Sheriff Tiraspol	1–1	3–1
Hertha BSC (Germany)	5–2	(Poland) Lech Poznań	2–0	3–2
Astana (Kazakhstan)	7–1	(Albania) Vllaznia	3–1	4–0
Anzhi Makhachkala (Russia)	3–5	(Israel) Maccabi Tel Aviv	3–2	0–3
Viitorul Constanța (Romania)	0–3	(Croatia) Dinamo Zagreb	0–1	0–2
Minsk (Belarus)	4–3	(Hungary) Illés Akadémia	1–0	3–3

=== Matches ===
3 October 2018
18:00 (19:00 UTC+3)

Altınordu (Turkey)	1–1	(Finland) HJK
Görmez 56' (pen.)	Report	Jäntti 86'

Doğanlar Stadium, İzmir
Attendance: 0
Referee: Furkat Atazhanov (Kazakhstan)
24 October 2018
18:00 (19:00 UTC+3)

HJK (Finland)	1–2	(Turkey) Altınordu
Banza 81'	Report	Yurttadur 67', 88'

Telia 5G -areena, Helsinki
Attendance: 450
Referee: Roomer Tarajev (Estonia)

Altınordu won 3–2 on aggregate.

3 October 2018
19:00

Žilina (Slovakia)	1–5	(France) Montpellier
Bernát 63'	Report	Ammour 14', 53'; Vercruysse 42'; Adouyev 44'; Vargas 81'

Štadión pod Dubňom, Žilina
Attendance: 1,609
Referee: Admir Šehović (Bosnia and Herzegovina)
24 October 2018
15:00

Montpellier (France)	2–0	(Slovakia) Žilina
Ammour 55'; Scordato 90+4'	Report

Complexe Bernard-Gasset, Montpellier
Attendance: 553
Referee: Christophe Pires (Luxembourg)

Montpellier won 7–1 on aggregate.

3 October 2018
16:00

Basel (Switzerland)	2–2	(Scotland) Hamilton Academical
Vonmoos 13'; Marchand 50'	Report	Douglas 7', 76'

Leichtathletik Stadion St. Jakob, Basel
Attendance: 332
Referee: Laurent Kopriwa (Luxembourg)
24 October 2018
20:00 (19:00 UTC+1)

Hamilton Academical (Scotland)	2–2	(Switzerland) Basel
Winter 19'; Slaven 90+5'	Report	Tushi 35'; Gaudiano 85'
Penalties
Slaven (penalty scored); Smith (penalty scored); McCann (penalty missed); Joseph (penalty missed); Mimnaugh (penalty scored)	3–2	(penalty missed) Lokaj; (penalty missed) Tushi; (penalty scored) Isufi; (penalty scored) Bislimi; (penalty missed) Kaufmann

New Douglas Park, Hamilton
Attendance: 2,460
Referee: Rohit Saggi (Norway)

4–4 on aggregate; Hamilton Academical won 3–2 on penalties.

3 October 2018
16:00 (17:00 UTC+3)

Dynamo Kyiv (Ukraine)	1–0	(Bulgaria) Septemvri Sofia
Voloshyn 40'	Report

Valeriy Lobanovskyi Dynamo Stadium, Kyiv
Attendance: 724
Referee: Alexandru Tean (Moldova)
24 October 2018
16:00 (17:00 UTC+3)

Septemvri Sofia (Bulgaria)	1–5	(Ukraine) Dynamo Kyiv
Kostadinov 6'	Report	Buletsa 26'; Voloshyn 38', 51'; Tsitaishvili 49' (pen.); Popov 88'

Vivacom Arena - Georgi Asparuhov Stadium, Sofia
Attendance: 500
Referee: Michal Ocenáš (Slovakia)

Dynamo Kyiv won 6–1 on aggregate.

3 October 2018
17:00 (15:00 UTC+0)

KR (Iceland)	1–2	(Sweden) IF Elfsborg
Kristinsson 44'	Report	Stålheden 39'; Sigurðsson 70' (o.g.)

KR-völlur, Reykjavík
Attendance: 280
Referee: Kári Jóannesarson Á Høvdanum (Faroe Islands)
24 October 2018
18:00

IF Elfsborg (Sweden)	1–0	(Iceland) KR
Hesselgren 63'	Report

Borås Arena, Borås
Attendance: 442
Referee: Nicholas Walsh (Scotland)

IF Elfsborg won 3–1 on aggregate.

3 October 2018
18:00

Anderlecht (Belgium)	0–0	(Austria) Flyeralarm Admira
	Report

Van Roystadion, Denderleeuw
Attendance: 364
Referee: Kai Erik Steen (Norway)
23 October 2018
18:00

Flyeralarm Admira (Austria)	1–1	(Belgium) Anderlecht
Weber 30'	Report	Dewaele 89'

Bundesstadion Südstadt, Maria Enzersdorf
Attendance: 1,400
Referee: Zbynek Proske (Czech Republic)

1–1 on aggregate; Anderlecht won on away goals.

3 October 2018
18:30

Midtjylland (Denmark)	2–1	(Republic of Ireland) Bohemians
Sørensen 27'; Tengstedt 75'	Report	Nolan 77'

MCH Arena, Herning
Attendance: 779
Referee: Ivar Orri Kristjansson (Iceland)
24 October 2018
20:00 (19:00 UTC+1)

Bohemians (Republic of Ireland)	1–2	(Denmark) Midtjylland
Reghba 43' (pen.)	Report	Tengstedt 55' (pen.); Byrne 77' (o.g.)

Dalymount Park, Dublin
Attendance: 1,563
Referee: Lionel Tschudi (Switzerland)

Midtjylland won 4–2 on aggregate.

3 October 2018
14:00 (13:00 UTC+1)

Chelsea (England)	10–1	(Norway) Molde
Brown 14', 43'; Moe 23' (o.g.); Gilmour 25', 37', 57'; Redan 26', 39', 50'; McEachran 65'	Report	Iversen 72'

Cobham Training Centre, Stoke d'Abernon
Attendance: 82
Referee: Jørgen Burchardt (Denmark)
24 October 2018
18:00

Molde (Norway)	0–4	(England) Chelsea
	Report	Anjorin 32'; Brown 81', 83', 90+2'

Aker Stadion, Molde
Attendance: 241
Referee: Erik Lambrechts (Belgium)

Chelsea won 14–1 on aggregate.

3 October 2018
18:00 (19:00 UTC+3)

AEL Limassol (Cyprus)	1–2	(Greece) PAOK
Gerolemou 29'	Report	Andreou 31' (o.g.); Pournaras 51'

Tsirio Stadium, Limassol
Attendance: 2,260
Referee: Dumitri Muntean (Moldova)
24 October 2018
18:00 (19:00 UTC+3)

PAOK (Greece)	2–0	(Cyprus) AEL Limassol
Gaitanidis 45+1', 50'	Report

Kaftanzoglio Stadium, Thessaloniki
Attendance: 600
Referee: Sandor Szabo (Hungary)

PAOK won 4–1 on aggregate.

3 October 2018
17:00

Sigma Olomouc (Czech Republic)	4–1	(Slovenia) Maribor
Galus 37'; Zmrzlý 55'; Matoušek 61'; Zlatohlávek 62'	Report	Žugelj 42'

Andrův stadion, Olomouc
Attendance: 1,950
Referee: Manfredas Lukjancukas (Lithuania)
24 October 2018
18:00

Maribor (Slovenia)	2–3	(Czech Republic) Sigma Olomouc
Matko 36', 48'	Report	Zlatohlávek 1', 54'; Zima 59'

Ljudski vrt, Maribor
Attendance: 520
Referee: Yigal Frid (Israel)

Sigma Olomouc won 7–3 on aggregate.

3 October 2018
16:00 (18:00 UTC+4)

Gabala (Azerbaijan)	1–1	(Moldova) Sheriff Tiraspol
Sadikhov 57' (pen.)	Report	Ignatov 31'

Gabala City Stadium, Qabala
Attendance: 350
Referee: Giorgi Kruashvili (Georgia)
24 October 2018
14:00 (15:00 UTC+3)

Sheriff Tiraspol (Moldova)	1–3	(Azerbaijan) Gabala
Nihaev 53' (pen.)	Report	Gurbanov 43', 62'; Dijinari 63' (o.g.)

Malaya Sportivnaya Arena, Tiraspol
Attendance: 726
Referee: Timotheos Christofi (Cyprus)

Gabala won 4–2 on aggregate.

3 October 2018
19:00

Hertha BSC (Germany)	2–0	(Poland) Lech Poznań
Werthmüller 31'; Ngankam 89' (pen.)	Report

Olympiapark-Amateurstadion, Berlin
Attendance: 798
Referee: Bojan Nikolić (Serbia)
24 October 2018
16:00

Lech Poznań (Poland)	2–3	(Germany) Hertha BSC
Sobol 57'; Skrzypczak 76'	Report	Ngankam 16', 38'; Albrecht 58'

Stadion Miejski, Poznań
Attendance: 1,200
Referee: Cătălin Gaman (Romania)

Hertha BSC won 5–2 on aggregate.

4 October 2018
09:00 (13:00 UTC+6)

Astana (Kazakhstan)	3–1	(Albania) Vllaznia
Prokopenko 2' (pen.), 10'; Zhakypbayev 53'	Report	Qardaku 90'

Astana Arena, Astana
Attendance: 0
Referee: Aleksei Matyunin (Russia)
24 October 2018
17:00

Vllaznia (Albania)	0–4	(Kazakhstan) Astana
	Report	Zhumadilov 37'; Sagnayev 61', 78', 89' (pen.)

Loro Boriçi Stadium, Shkodër
Attendance: 2,000
Referee: Farrugia Cann Trustin (Malta)

Astana won 7–1 on aggregate.

3 October 2018
16:30 (18:30 UTC+4)

Anzhi Makhachkala (Russia)	3–2	(Israel) Maccabi Tel Aviv
Chilaka 49' (o.g.); Saidov 70'; Agalarov 83'	Report	Guerrero 36'; Shalata 52'

Central Stadium, Astrakhan
Attendance: 550
Referee: Aleksandrs Anufrijevs (Latvia)
24 October 2018
16:00 (17:00 UTC+3)

Maccabi Tel Aviv (Israel)	3–0	(Russia) Anzhi Makhachkala
Guerrero 7' (pen.), 90+2', 90+4'	Report

Ramla Municipal Stadium, Ramla
Attendance: 1,040
Referee: Krzysztof Jakubik (Poland)

Maccabi Tel Aviv won 5–3 on aggregate.

2 October 2018
17:00 (18:00 UTC+3)

Viitorul Constanța (Romania)	0–1	(Croatia) Dinamo Zagreb
	Report	Ćuže 37'

Stadionul Viitorul, Ovidiu
Attendance: 837
Referee: Juxhin Xhaja (Albania)
23 October 2018
15:00

Dinamo Zagreb (Croatia)	2–0	(Romania) Viitorul Constanța
Leca 28' (o.g.); Ćuže 82'	Report

Stadion Hitrec-Kacian, Zagreb
Attendance: 536
Referee: Vitaliy Romanov (Ukraine)

Dinamo Zagreb won 3–0 on aggregate.

3 October 2018
15:00 (16:00 UTC+3)

Minsk (Belarus)	1–0	(Hungary) Illés Akadémia
Zherdev 44'	Report

Traktor Stadium, Minsk
Attendance: 500
Referee: Rahim Hasanov (Azerbaijan)
24 October 2018
16:30

Illés Akadémia (Hungary)	3–3	(Belarus) Minsk
Kovalovszki 14'; Horváth 16'; Tóth-Gábor 32'	Report	Zherdev 22'; Prischepa 70'; Krapivnitski 90+2'

Rohonci út, Szombathely
Attendance: 1,300
Referee: Suren Baliyan (Armenia)

Minsk won 4–3 on aggregate.

== Second round ==
=== Summary ===
The first legs were played on 6 and 7 November 2018, and the second legs were played on 27 and 28 November 2018.

Team 1	Agg.	Team 2	1st leg	2nd leg
Anderlecht (Belgium)	2–3	(Ukraine) Dynamo Kyiv	1–1	1–2
Midtjylland (Denmark)	4–1	(Scotland) Hamilton Academical	2–0	2–1
Altınordu (Turkey)	2–5	(France) Montpellier	2–4	0–1
IF Elfsborg (Sweden)	0–9	(England) Chelsea	0–3	0–6
PAOK (Greece)	3–1	(Belarus) Minsk	2–1	1–0
Gabala (Azerbaijan)	1–4	(Germany) Hertha BSC	1–3	0–1
Astana (Kazakhstan)	2–4	(Croatia) Dinamo Zagreb	1–1	1–3
Sigma Olomouc (Czech Republic)	3–3 (a)	(Israel) Maccabi Tel Aviv	1–1	2–2

=== Matches ===
6 November 2018
19:30

Anderlecht (Belgium)	1–1	(Ukraine) Dynamo Kyiv
Dewaele 27' (pen.)	Report	Mashchenko 70'

Constant Vanden Stock Stadium, Brussels
Attendance: 421
Referee: Igor Pajac (Croatia)
27 November 2018
16:00 (17:00 UTC+2)

Dynamo Kyiv (Ukraine)	2–1	(Belgium) Anderlecht
Tsitaishvili 65'; Buletsa 83' (pen.)	Report	Colassin 51'

Valeriy Lobanovskyi Dynamo Stadium, Kyiv
Attendance: 335
Referee: Denis Scherbakov (Belarus)

Dynamo Kyiv won 3–2 on aggregate.

7 November 2018
18:30

Midtjylland (Denmark)	2–0	(Scotland) Hamilton Academical
Tengstedt 14', 28'	Report

MCH Arena, Herning
Attendance: 712
Referee: Paul Mclaughlin (Republic of Ireland)
28 November 2018
20:00 (19:00 UTC+0)

Hamilton Academical (Scotland)	1–2	(Denmark) Midtjylland
Winter 10'	Report	Tengstedt 66' (pen.); Hansen 90'

New Douglas Park, Hamilton
Attendance: 2,498
Referee: Bryn Markham-Jones (Wales)

Midtjylland won 4–1 on aggregate.

7 November 2018
16:00 (18:00 UTC+3)

Altınordu (Turkey)	2–4	(France) Montpellier
Görmez 38'; Yurrdatur 57'	Report	Biçer 11' (o.g.); Badu 42', 86'; Benchama 88'

Doğanlar Stadium, İzmir
Attendance: 1,186
Referee: Denys Shurman (Ukraine)
28 November 2018
15:00

Montpellier (France)	1–0	(Turkey) Altınordu
Biçer 74' (o.g.)	Report

Complexe Bernard-Gasset, Montpellier
Attendance: 518
Referee: Urs Schnyder (Switzerland)

Montpellier won 5–2 on aggregate.

7 November 2018
18:00

IF Elfsborg (Sweden)	0–3	(England) Chelsea
	Report	Brown 13', 90+3'; Gilmour 86' (pen.)

Borås Arena, Borås
Attendance: 3,612
Referee: Jari Järvinen (Finland)
28 November 2018
14:00 (13:00 UTC+0)

Chelsea (England)	6–0	(Sweden) IF Elfsborg
Brown 15', 41'; Redan 21'; Familio-Castillo 45'; McEachran 48'; Uwakwe 57'	Report

Cobham Training Centre, Stoke d'Abernon
Attendance: 122
Referee: Kristoffer Hagenes (Norway)

Chelsea won 9–0 on aggregate.

7 November 2018
16:00 (17:00 UTC+2)

PAOK (Greece)	2–1	(Belarus) Minsk
Doumtsis 44'; Chatzistravos 46'	Report	Gorbach 11'

Toumba Stadium, Thessaloniki
Attendance: 450
Referee: Alain Durieux (Luxembourg)
28 November 2018
12:00 (14:00 UTC+3)

Minsk (Belarus)	0–1	(Greece) PAOK
	Report	Gaitanidis 61'

FC Minsk Stadium, Minsk
Attendance: 300
Referee: Dejan Jakimovski (Macedonia)

PAOK won 3–1 on aggregate.

7 November 2018
14:00 (17:00 UTC+4)

Gabala (Azerbaijan)	1–3	(Germany) Hertha BSC
Sadikhov 88'	Report	Kiprit 65'; Ngankam 71'; Werthmüller 85'

Gabala City Stadium, Qabala
Attendance: 450
Referee: Daniyar Sakhi (Kazakhstan)
28 November 2018
13:00

Hertha BSC (Germany)	1–0	(Azerbaijan) Gabala
Kiprit 24' (pen.)	Report

Olympiapark-Amateurstadion, Berlin
Attendance: 360
Referee: Ferenc Karakó (Hungary)

Hertha BSC won 4–1 on aggregate.

7 November 2018
06:00 (11:00 UTC+6)

Astana (Kazakhstan)	1–1	(Croatia) Dinamo Zagreb
Prokopenko 45'	Report	Šipoš 87'

Astana Arena, Astana
Attendance: 116
Referee: Aleksandrs Anufrijevs (Latvia)
27 November 2018
13:30

Dinamo Zagreb (Croatia)	3–1	(Kazakhstan) Astana
Šipoš 1'; Franjić 42' (pen.); Kapitanović 77'	Report	Mazhit 49'

Stadion Hitrec-Kacian, Zagreb
Attendance: 563
Referee: Pavel Orel (Czech Republic)

Dinamo Zagreb won 4–2 on aggregate.

7 November 2018
16:00

Sigma Olomouc (Czech Republic)	1–1	(Israel) Maccabi Tel Aviv
Zima 68'	Report	Shalata 87'

Andrův stadion, Olomouc
Attendance: 2,800
Referee: Peter Kjaesgaard (Denmark)
28 November 2018
16:00 (17:00 UTC+2)

Maccabi Tel Aviv (Israel)	2–2	(Czech Republic) Sigma Olomouc
Strosberg 58'; Guerrero 72'	Report	Zifčák 50'; Zmrzlý 78'

Ramla Municipal Stadium, Ramla
Attendance: 1,154
Referee: Alper Ulusoy (Turkey)

3–3 on aggregate; Sigma Olomouc won on away goals.
