= Gleb Zherdev =

Belarusian footballer

Gleb Zherdev Глеб Жэрдзеў
Personal information
- Date of birth: 18 May 2000 (age 26)
- Place of birth: Minsk, Belarus
- Height: 1.80 m (5 ft 11 in)
- Position: Midfielder

Team information
- Current team: Minsk
- Number: 10

Youth career
- 2015–2019: Minsk

Senior career*
| Years | Team | Apps | (Gls) |
| 2018–2021 | Minsk | 11 | (1) |
| 2020 | → Naftan Novopolotsk (loan) | 10 | (3) |
| 2021 | → Slavia Mozyr (loan) | 23 | (4) |
| 2022 | Slavia Mozyr | 29 | (10) |
| 2023 | Bnei Yehuda | 13 | (2) |
| 2023–2024 | Dinamo Minsk | 36 | (3) |
| 2025–2026 | Maxline Vitebsk | 8 | (2) |
| 2026 | Slavia Mozyr | 6 | (0) |
| 2026– | Minsk | 4 | (0) |

International career^{‡}
| 2017 | Belarus U17 | | |
| 2021–2022 | Belarus U21 | 5 | (0) |
- * Club domestic league appearances and goals as of 6 September 2026 ‡ National team caps and goals as of 8 June 2022

Gleb Zherdev (Belarusian: Глеб Жэрдзеў; Russian: Глеб Жердев; born 18 May 2000) is a Belarusian professional footballer who plays for Belarusian Premier League club Minsk.
