= Gordon Neate =

English footballer (1941–2019)

Personal information
- Full name: Gordon Neate
- Date of birth: 14 March 1941
- Place of birth: Reading, England
- Date of death: May 2019 (aged 78)
- Position: Full back

Youth career
- 1956–1959: Reading

Senior career*
Years	Team	Apps	(Gls)
1959–1966	Reading	99	(2)
Total		99	(2)
- * Club domestic league appearances and goals

Gordon Neate (14 March 1941 – May 2019) was an English professional footballer who played as a full back.

== Career ==
Born in Reading, Neate joined hometown club Reading in 1956 at the age of 15, turned professional in March 1958, and made his senior debut in April 1959. Whilst at Reading he was nicknamed "Fred" by teammate Maurice Evans. After making 99 league appearances for the club, he retired due to injury in 1966, aged 25. He then worked for the club as groundsman until he retired in 2009, aged 68, after 53 years with the club as both player and staff.
