= Dave Hargreaves =

English footballer (1954–2018)

Personal information
- Full name: David Hargreaves
- Date of birth: 27 August 1954
- Place of birth: Accrington, England
- Date of death: 6 August 2018 (aged 63)
- Position: Striker

Senior career*
Years	Team	Apps	(Gls)
1974–1977	Accrington Stanley		
1977–1979	Blackburn Rovers	2	(0)
1979–1985	Accrington Stanley		
- * Club domestic league appearances and goals

David Hargreaves (27 August 1954 – 6 August 2018) was an English professional footballer who played for Accrington Stanley and Blackburn Rovers, as a striker.

== Early and personal life ==
Hargreaves was born in Accrington. He was nicknamed "Haggis".

== Career ==
Hargreaves began his career with Accrington Stanley in 1974, and scored 56 goals in 44 appearances in the 1975–76 season. He signed for Blackburn Rovers in December 1977, spending two "injury-blighted" seasons, and only making two League appearances for the club. He returned to Accrington Stanley, staying there until 1985. He scored a total of 309 goals in 322 games for them, a club record.

== Later life and death ==
Hargreaves died on 6 August 2018, at the age of 63.
