= Geoff Toseland =

English footballer (1931–2019)

Personal information
- Full name: Geoffrey Toseland
- Date of birth: 31 January 1931
- Place of birth: Kettering, England
- Date of death: 16 May 2019 (aged 88)
- Position: Winger

Senior career*
Years	Team	Apps	(Gls)
1948	Kettering Town		
1948–1955	Sunderland	6	(1)
1955–195?	Kettering Town		
- * Club domestic league appearances and goals

Geoffrey Toseland (31 January 1931 – 16 May 2019) was an English professional footballer who played as a winger for Sunderland.

Toseland died on 16 May 2019, aged 88.
