= Peter Dolby =

English footballer (1940–2019)

Personal information
- Full name: Peter Dolby
- Date of birth: 18 May 1940
- Place of birth: Derby, England
- Date of death: 28 February 2019 (aged 78)
- Place of death: Shrewsbury, England
- Height: 6 ft 1 in (1.85 m)
- Position: Centre half

Senior career*
Years	Team	Apps	(Gls)
–1960	Heanor Town		
1960–1976	Shrewsbury Town	324	(21)
- * Club domestic league appearances and goals

Peter Dolby (18 May 1940 – 28 February 2019) was an English professional football centre half who made over 320 appearances in the Football League for Shrewsbury Town.

== Playing career ==
Dolby played for Shrewsbury Town between 1960 and 1976. He was the fifth club legend to be inducted into the club's Hall of Fame in 2011.

== Personal life ==
After retiring from football, Dolby ran a newsagent's and worked as a teacher.

Dolby, who latterly lived in a residential home in Shrewsbury, died in his sleep in the early hours of 28 February 2019.
