= Chris Weller (footballer) =

English footballer and manager (1939–2018)

Personal information
- Full name: Christopher William Weller
- Date of birth: 25 December 1939
- Place of birth: Reading, England
- Date of death: 4 June 2018 (aged 78)
- Place of death: Wimborne Minster, England
- Position: Forward

Senior career*
Years	Team	Apps	(Gls)
1958–1959	Reading		
1959–1965	Bournemouth & Boscombe Athletic		
1965–1966	Bristol Rovers	3	(0)
1966–1967	Bournemouth & Boscombe Athletic		
1967–1973	Yeovil Town	218	(102)
1973–1975	Salisbury City		
1975–1977	Poole Town		
1977–1978	Ringwood Town		
1978–????	Holt United		

Managerial career
- 1978–1983: Holt United (player-manager)
- 1983–1985: Shaftesbury
- 1985–1987: Holt United
- 1987–1989: Wimborne Town
- 1989–1992: Brockenhurst
- 1992–1993: Wimborne Town
- 1993–????: Bournemouth F.C. (coach)
- * Club domestic league appearances and goals

Christopher William Weller (25 December 1939 – 4 June 2018) was a professional footballer who played as a forward for eight different clubs over a 20-year career.

He began his career with his home town club, Reading, for whom he played as an amateur, before moving on to Bournemouth & Boscombe Athletic (now known as A.F.C. Bournemouth) in 1959. He made 111 appearances, scoring 26 goals, in two spells with The Cherries which was interspersed with a brief stint at Bristol Rovers, where he played three games. After departing Bournemouth in 1967 he spent the remainder of his career playing and managing in non-League football around the south of England.

Chris Weller died on 4 June 2018 following a battle against dementia.
