= Leon Šipoš =

Croatian footballer

Personal information
- Date of birth: 28 February 2000 (age 26)
- Place of birth: Varaždin, Croatia
- Height: 1.93 m (6 ft 4 in)
- Position: Forward

Team information
- Current team: Reggiana
- Number: 25

Youth career
- Varaždin
- –2013: Dinamo Zagreb

Senior career*
Years	Team	Apps	(Gls)
2013–2018	Gorica	21	(3)
2018–2020	Dinamo Zagreb	1	(0)
2018–2020	→ Dinamo Zagreb II (loan)	31	(7)
2020–2023	Spartaks Jūrmala	11	(2)
2021	→ Istra 1961 (loan)	8	(0)
2021–2022	→ Catania (loan)	26	(7)
2022–2023	→ Fidelis Andria (loan)	17	(0)
2023–2024	Trento	22	(1)
2024–2026	Lecco	68	(23)
2026–	Reggiana	10	(8)

International career^{‡}
2019	Croatia U19	3	(0)
- * Club domestic league appearances and goals as of 24 August 2026 ‡ National team caps and goals as of 26 March 2019

Leon Šipoš (born 28 February 2000) is a Croatian footballer who plays as a forward for Serie C Group B club Reggiana.

== Career ==
As a youth player, Šipoš joined the youth academy of Dinamo (Zagreb), Croatia's most successful club.

In 2017, he was sent on loan to Gorica (Croatia) in the Croatian second division.

In 2020, he signed for Latvian side Spartaks after receiving interest from England and Russia.

Before the second half of 2020–21 season, Šipoš signed for Istra in the Croatian top flight on loan.

On 20 August 2021, he joined Serie C club Catania on loan with an option to buy. On 9 April 2022, his loan to Catania was cut short following the club's exclusion from Italian football due to its inability to overcome a number of financial issues.

On 5 August 2022, Šipoš moved on a new loan to Fidelis Andria in Serie C, with an option to buy.

On 7 January 2023, Šipoš signed a 2.5-year contract with Serie C club Trento.

On 30 August 2024, Šipoš moved to Lecco on a two-year deal.
