= 2017 UEFA European Under-17 Championship squads =

Football tournament squads

The following is a list of squads for each national team that competed at the 2017 UEFA European Under-17 Championship in Croatia. Each national team had to submit a squad of 18 players born on or after 1 January 2000.

Players in boldface have been capped at full international level at some point in their career.

== Group A ==
=== Croatia ===
Head coach: (Croatia) Dario Bašić

No.	Pos.	Player	Date of birth (age)	Club
1	GK	**Dominik Kotarski**	10 February 2000 (aged 17)	(Croatian Football Federation) Dinamo Zagreb
2	DF	Filip Hlevnjak	5 August 2000 (aged 16)	(Croatian Football Federation) Slaven Belupo
3	DF	David Čolina	19 July 2000 (aged 16)	(Croatian Football Federation) Dinamo Zagreb
4	DF	Ivan Nekić	24 December 2000 (aged 16)	(Croatian Football Federation) Rijeka
5	DF	Stipe Radić	10 June 2000 (aged 16)	(Croatian Football Federation) Hajduk Split
6	MF	Bartol Franjić	14 January 2000 (aged 17)	(Croatian Football Federation) Dinamo Zagreb
7	FW	Leon Kreković	7 May 2000 (aged 16)	(Croatian Football Federation) Hajduk Split
8	MF	Marko Hanuljak	31 January 2000 (aged 17)	(Croatian Football Federation) Hypo Limač Osijek
9	FW	Antonio Marin	9 January 2001 (aged 16)	(Croatian Football Federation) Dinamo Zagreb
10	MF	Jurica Pršir	29 May 2000 (aged 16)	(Croatian Football Federation) Dinamo Zagreb
11	FW	Michele Šego	5 August 2000 (aged 16)	(Croatian Football Federation) Hajduk Split
12	GK	Vice Baždarić	14 February 2000 (aged 17)	(Croatian Football Federation) Hajduk Split
13	DF	Mario Vušković	16 November 2001 (aged 15)	(Croatian Football Federation) Hajduk Split
14	DF	Tin Hrvoj	6 June 2001 (aged 15)	(Croatian Football Federation) Dinamo Zagreb
15	MF	Juraj Ljubić	26 May 2000 (aged 16)	(Croatian Football Federation) Dinamo Zagreb
16	FW	Josip Mitrović	11 June 2000 (aged 16)	(Croatian Football Federation) Rijeka
17	FW	Roko Baturina	20 June 2000 (aged 16)	(Croatian Football Federation) RNK Split
18	MF	Tomislav Krizmanić	21 April 2001 (aged 16)	(Croatian Football Federation) Dinamo Zagreb

=== Spain ===
Head coach: (Spain) Santiago Denia

No.	Pos.	Player	Date of birth (age)	Club
1	GK	Álvaro Fernández Calvo	10 April 2000 (aged 17)	(Royal Spanish Football Federation) CD San Félix
2	DF	Mateu Morey	2 March 2000 (aged 17)	(Royal Spanish Football Federation) Barcelona
3	DF	**Juan Miranda**	19 January 2000 (aged 17)	(Royal Spanish Football Federation) Barcelona
4	DF	**Hugo Guillamón**	31 January 2000 (aged 17)	(Royal Spanish Football Federation) Valencia
5	DF	Víctor Chust	5 March 2000 (aged 17)	(Royal Spanish Football Federation) Real Madrid
6	FW	Antonio Blanco	23 July 2000 (aged 16)	(Royal Spanish Football Federation) Real Madrid
7	FW	**Ferran Torres**	29 February 2000 (aged 17)	(Royal Spanish Football Federation) Valencia
8	MF	Moha Moukhliss	6 February 2000 (aged 17)	(Royal Spanish Football Federation) Real Madrid
9	FW	**Abel Ruiz**	28 January 2000 (aged 17)	(Royal Spanish Football Federation) Barcelona
10	MF	**Sergio Gómez**	4 September 2000 (aged 16)	(Royal Spanish Football Federation) Barcelona
11	FW	Ignacio Díaz Barragán	27 June 2000 (aged 16)	(Royal Spanish Football Federation) Roda
12	DF	Víctor Gomez	1 April 2000 (aged 17)	(Royal Spanish Football Federation) Espanyol
13	GK	Mohamed Airam Ramos Wade	13 April 2000 (aged 17)	(Royal Spanish Football Federation) Real Madrid
14	MF	Alvaro García	1 June 2000 (aged 16)	(Royal Spanish Football Federation) Albacete
15	DF	**Eric García**	9 January 2001 (aged 16)	(Royal Spanish Football Federation) Barcelona
16	MF	Jandro Arellana	7 August 2000 (aged 16)	(Royal Spanish Football Federation) Barcelona
17	MF	José Lara	7 March 2000 (aged 17)	(Royal Spanish Football Federation) Sevilla
18	MF	César Gelabert	31 October 2000 (aged 16)	(Royal Spanish Football Federation) Real Madrid
19	MF	Carlos Beitia Cardos	15 February 2000 (aged 17)	(Royal Spanish Football Federation) Roda

1. Carlos Beitia was called up during the tournament due to an injury to Álvaro García Segovia.

=== Turkey ===
Head coach: (Turkey) Mehmet Hacıoğlu

No.	Pos.	Player	Date of birth (age)	Club
1	GK	Berke Özer	25 May 2000 (aged 16)	(Turkish Football Federation) Altınordu
2	DF	Emirhan Civelek	5 January 2000 (aged 17)	(Turkish Football Federation) Galatasaray
3	DF	Bekir Melih Gökçimen	24 April 2000 (aged 17)	(Turkish Football Federation) Galatasaray
4	DF	Abdussamed Karnuçu	4 February 2000 (aged 17)	(Turkish Football Federation) Galatasaray
5	DF	**Ozan Kabak**	25 March 2000 (aged 17)	(Turkish Football Federation) Galatasaray
6	MF	Sefa Akgün	30 June 2000 (aged 16)	(Turkish Football Federation) Trabzonspor
7	MF	Recep Gül	5 November 2000 (aged 16)	(Turkish Football Federation) Galatasaray
8	MF	Kerem Kesgin	5 November 2000 (aged 16)	(Turkish Football Federation) Bucaspor
9	FW	Malik Karaahmet	18 January 2000 (aged 17)	(German Football Association) Eintracht Frankfurt
10	FW	Atalay Babacan	11 June 2000 (aged 16)	(Turkish Football Federation) Galatasaray
11	FW	**Yunus Akgün**	7 July 2000 (aged 16)	(Turkish Football Federation) Galatasaray
12	GK	Ozan Can Oruç	26 May 2000 (aged 16)	(Turkish Football Federation) Altınordu
13	DF	Berk Çetin	2 February 2000 (aged 17)	(German Football Association) Borussia Mönchengladbach
14	MF	Umut Güneş	16 March 2000 (aged 17)	(German Football Association) VfB Stuttgart
15	DF	Berkehan Biçer	1 January 2000 (aged 17)	(Turkish Football Federation) Altınordu
16	MF	Egehan Gök	27 February 2000 (aged 17)	(Turkish Football Federation) Altınordu
17	MF	Enes İslam İlkin	11 January 2000 (aged 17)	(Turkish Football Federation) Samsunspor
18	MF	Hasan Adigüzel	3 April 2000 (aged 17)	(Turkish Football Federation) Akhisar Belediyespor

=== Italy ===
Head coach: (Italy) Emiliano Bigica

No.	Pos.	Player	Date of birth (age)	Club
1	GK	Simone Ghidotti	19 March 2000 (aged 17)	(Italian Football Federation) Fiorentina
2	DF	**Raoul Bellanova**	17 May 2000 (aged 16)	(Italian Football Federation) Milan
3	DF	Axel Campeol	5 March 2000 (aged 17)	(Italian Football Federation) Milan
4	MF	Andrea Rizzo Pinna	13 January 2000 (aged 17)	(Italian Football Federation) Atalanta
5	DF	Matteo Anzolin	11 November 2000 (aged 16)	(Italian Football Federation) Vicenza
6	DF	Davide Bettella	7 April 2000 (aged 17)	(Italian Football Federation) Inter Milan
7	MF	Elia Visconti	30 June 2000 (aged 16)	(Italian Football Federation) Inter Milan
8	MF	Fabrizio Caligara	12 April 2000 (aged 17)	(Italian Football Federation) Juventus
9	FW	**Moise Kean**	28 February 2000 (aged 17)	(Italian Football Federation) Juventus
10	MF	Roberto Biancu	19 January 2000 (aged 17)	(Italian Football Federation) Cagliari
11	FW	Davide Merola	27 March 2000 (aged 17)	(Italian Football Federation) Inter Milan
12	GK	Marco Carnesecchi	1 July 2000 (aged 16)	(Italian Football Federation) Cesena
13	DF	Gabriele Bellodi	2 September 2000 (aged 16)	(Italian Football Federation) Milan
14	MF	Hans Nicolussi	18 June 2000 (aged 16)	(Italian Football Federation) Juventus
15	DF	Antonio Candela	27 April 2000 (aged 17)	(Italian Football Federation) Spezia
16	MF	Emanuel Vignato	24 August 2000 (aged 16)	(Italian Football Federation) Chievo
17	MF	Manolo Portanova	2 June 2000 (aged 16)	(Italian Football Federation) Lazio
18	FW	**Pietro Pellegri**	17 March 2001 (aged 16)	(Italian Football Federation) Genoa
19	GK	Luca Gemello	3 July 2000 (aged 16)	(Italian Football Federation) Torino
20	FW	Flavio Bianchi	24 January 2000 (aged 17)	(Italian Football Federation) Genoa

1. Luca Gemello was called up during the tournament due to an injury to Marco Carnesecchi. Flavio Bianchi was called up due to an injury to Fabrizio Caligara.

== Group B ==
=== Scotland ===
Head coach: (Scotland) Scot Gemmill

No.	Pos.	Player	Date of birth (age)	Club
1	GK	Jon McCracken	24 May 2000 (aged 16)	(The Football Association) Norwich City
2	DF	Lewis Mayo	19 March 2000 (aged 17)	(Scottish Football Association) Rangers
3	DF	Daniel Church	21 July 2000 (aged 16)	(Scottish Football Association) Celtic
4	DF	Stephen Welsh	19 January 2000 (aged 17)	(Scottish Football Association) Celtic
5	DF	Robbie Deas	27 February 2000 (aged 17)	(Scottish Football Association) Celtic
6	DF	Jonny Mitchell	1 January 2000 (aged 17)	(Scottish Football Association) Falkirk
7	FW	Jack Aitchison	5 March 2000 (aged 17)	(Scottish Football Association) Celtic
8	MF	Elliot Watt	11 March 2000 (aged 17)	(The Football Association) Wolverhampton Wanderers
9	FW	Zak Rudden	6 February 2000 (aged 17)	(Scottish Football Association) Rangers
10	FW	Lewis Hutchison	19 February 2000 (aged 17)	(Scottish Football Association) Aberdeen
11	FW	Glenn Middleton	1 January 2000 (aged 17)	(The Football Association) Norwich City
12	GK	Ryan Mullen	18 May 2001 (aged 15)	(Scottish Football Association) Celtic
13	MF	Seb Ross	20 January 2000 (aged 17)	(Scottish Football Association) Aberdeen
14	FW	Innes Cameron	22 August 2000 (aged 16)	(Scottish Football Association) Kilmarnock
15	MF	Lewis Smith	16 March 2000 (aged 17)	(Scottish Football Association) Hamilton Academical
16	DF	Kerr McInroy	21 August 2000 (aged 16)	(Scottish Football Association) Celtic
17	DF	Jordan Houston	20 January 2000 (aged 17)	(Scottish Football Association) Rangers
18	DF	Aaron Reid	11 May 2000 (aged 16)	(Scottish Football Association) Heart of Midlothian

=== France ===
Head coach: (France) Lionel Rouxel

No.	Pos.	Player	Date of birth (age)	Club
1	GK	Nathan Cremillieux	9 January 2000 (aged 17)	(French Football Federation) Saint-Étienne
2	DF	Vincent Collet	23 March 2000 (aged 17)	(French Football Federation) Metz
3	DF	Hakim Guenouche	30 May 2000 (aged 16)	(French Football Federation) Nancy
4	DF	William Bianda	30 April 2000 (aged 17)	(French Football Federation) Lens
5	DF	**Andy Pelmard**	12 March 2000 (aged 17)	(French Football Federation) Nice
6	MF	Claudio Gomes	23 July 2000 (aged 16)	(French Football Federation) Paris Saint-Germain
7	FW	Yacine Adli	29 July 2000 (aged 16)	(French Football Federation) Paris Saint-Germain
8	MF	**Aurélien Tchouameni**	27 January 2000 (aged 17)	(French Football Federation) Bordeaux
9	FW	**Amine Gouiri**	16 February 2000 (aged 17)	(French Football Federation) Lyon
10	MF	Maxence Caqueret	15 February 2000 (aged 17)	(French Football Federation) Lyon
11	FW	Willem Geubbels	16 August 2001 (aged 15)	(French Football Federation) Lyon
12	FW	Alan Kerouedan	12 January 2000 (aged 17)	(French Football Federation) Rennes
13	FW	Alexis Flips	18 January 2000 (aged 17)	(French Football Federation) Lille
14	MF	Mathis Picouleau	8 May 2000 (aged 16)	(French Football Federation) Rennes
15	DF	John Da	3 March 2000 (aged 17)	(French Football Federation) Nancy
16	GK	**Yahia Fofana**	21 August 2000 (aged 16)	(French Football Federation) Le Havre
17	DF	**Maxence Lacroix**	6 April 2000 (aged 17)	(French Football Federation) Sochaux
18	FW	**Wilson Isidor**	27 August 2000 (aged 16)	(French Football Federation) Rennes

=== Hungary ===
Head coach: (Hungary) Zoltán Szélesi

No.	Pos.	Player	Date of birth (age)	Club
1	GK	Balázs Ásványi	13 May 2001 (aged 15)	(Hungarian Football Federation) Puskás Akadémia
2	DF	Krisztián Kovács	29 May 2000 (aged 16)	(Hungarian Football Federation) Győri ETO
3	DF	Martin Majnovics	26 October 2000 (aged 16)	(Austrian Football Association) Mattersburg
4	DF	Balázs Opavszky	18 February 2000 (aged 17)	(Hungarian Football Federation) Vasas
6	MF	**Dominik Szoboszlai**	25 October 2000 (aged 16)	(Austrian Football Association) Red Bull Salzburg
7	FW	Krisztofer Szerető	10 January 2000 (aged 17)	(The Football Association) Stoke City
8	MF	András Csonka	1 May 2000 (aged 17)	(Hungarian Football Federation) Ferencváros
9	FW	Norbert Szendrei	27 March 2000 (aged 17)	(Hungarian Football Federation) Budapest Honvéd
10	MF	**Szabolcs Schön**	27 September 2000 (aged 16)	(Royal Dutch Football Association) Ajax
11	FW	Márk Bencze	30 January 2000 (aged 17)	(Royal Dutch Football Association) Vitesse
14	DF	**Attila Mocsi**	29 May 2000 (aged 16)	(Hungarian Football Federation) Győri ETO
15	DF	Gergő Bolla	22 February 2000 (aged 17)	(Hungarian Football Federation) Haladás
17	FW	**Kevin Csoboth**	20 June 2000 (aged 16)	(Portuguese Football Federation) Benfica
19	FW	Alexander Torvund	1 August 2000 (aged 16)	(Hungarian Football Federation) Vasas
20	MF	**Tamás Kiss**	24 November 2000 (aged 16)	(Hungarian Football Federation) Haladás
21	FW	Norman Timári	18 February 2000 (aged 17)	(Hungarian Football Federation) Puskás Akadémia
22	GK	István Oroszi	14 September 2000 (aged 16)	(Hungarian Football Federation) Ferencváros
23	DF	Dominik Arday	8 December 2000 (aged 16)	(Hungarian Football Federation) Vasas

=== Faroe Islands ===
Head coach: (Faroe Islands) Áki Johansen

No.	Pos.	Player	Date of birth (age)	Club
1	GK	**Bárður á Reynatrøð**	8 January 2000 (aged 17)	(Faroe Islands Football Association) Víkingur Gøta
2	DF	Sjúrður Pauli Chin Nielsen	18 April 2000 (aged 17)	(Faroe Islands Football Association) NSÍ Runavík
3	DF	**Andrias Edmundsson**	18 December 2000 (aged 16)	(Faroe Islands Football Association) B68 Toftir
4	DF	Dann Fróðason	27 April 2000 (aged 17)	(Faroe Islands Football Association) 07 Vestur
6	MF	**Magnus Holm Jacobsen**	23 May 2000 (aged 16)	(Faroe Islands Football Association) B36 Tórshavn
7	MF	Hanus Sørensen	19 February 2001 (aged 16)	(Danish Football Association) FC Midtjylland
8	MF	Asbjørn Heðinsson	19 December 2000 (aged 16)	(Faroe Islands Football Association) 07 Vestur
9	MF	**Stefan Radosavljevic**	8 September 2000 (aged 16)	(Faroe Islands Football Association) TB Tvøroyri
11	FW	Elias El Moustage	30 May 2001 (aged 15)	(Danish Football Association) AaB
12	GK	Bjarti Vitalis Mørk	7 June 2001 (aged 15)	(Faroe Islands Football Association) HB Tórshavn
13	FW	Steffan Løkin	13 November 2000 (aged 16)	(Faroe Islands Football Association) NSÍ Runavík
14	DF	Bjarni Brimnes	21 May 2000 (aged 16)	(Faroe Islands Football Association) HB Tórshavn
15	FW	Tórur Jacobsen	24 April 2000 (aged 17)	(Faroe Islands Football Association) KÍ Klaksvík
16	MF	Símun Sólheim	25 February 2001 (aged 16)	(Faroe Islands Football Association) HB Tórshavn
17	DF	Sveinur Lava Olsen	14 January 2001 (aged 16)	(Faroe Islands Football Association) HB Tórshavn
18	MF	Sølvi Sigvardsen	18 October 2000 (aged 16)	(Faroe Islands Football Association) NSÍ Runavík
19	MF	Filip í Liða	6 November 2000 (aged 16)	(Faroe Islands Football Association) AB Argir
20	MF	Jákup Joensen	27 February 2000 (aged 17)	(Faroe Islands Football Association) Skála ÍF

== Group C ==
=== Germany ===
Head coach: (Germany) Christian Wück

No.	Pos.	Player	Date of birth (age)	Club
1	GK	Luca Plogmann	10 March 2000 (aged 17)	(German Football Association) Werder Bremen
2	DF	Alexander Nitzl	11 July 2000 (aged 16)	(German Football Association) Bayern Munich
3	DF	Pascal Hackethal	27 January 2000 (aged 17)	(German Football Association) Werder Bremen
4	DF	Dominik Becker	9 January 2000 (aged 17)	(German Football Association) 1. FC Köln
5	DF	Jan Boller	14 March 2000 (aged 17)	(German Football Association) Bayer Leverkusen
6	MF	Noah Awuku	9 January 2000 (aged 17)	(German Football Association) Holstein Kiel
7	MF	Şahverdi Çetin	28 September 2000 (aged 16)	(German Football Association) Eintracht Frankfurt
8	MF	Erik Majetschak	1 March 2000 (aged 17)	(German Football Association) RB Leipzig
9	FW	Jann-Fiete Arp	6 January 2000 (aged 17)	(German Football Association) Hamburger SV
10	MF	Elias Abouchabaka	31 March 2000 (aged 17)	(German Football Association) RB Leipzig
11	FW	Eric Hottmann	8 February 2000 (aged 17)	(German Football Association) VfB Stuttgart
12	GK	Luis Klatte	1 March 2000 (aged 17)	(German Football Association) Hertha BSC
13	FW	Dennis Jastrzembski	20 February 2000 (aged 17)	(German Football Association) Hertha BSC
14	MF	Yannik Keitel	15 February 2000 (aged 17)	(German Football Association) SC Freiburg
15	MF	Kilian Ludewig	5 March 2000 (aged 17)	(German Football Association) RB Leipzig
16	DF	Lukas Mai	31 March 2000 (aged 17)	(German Football Association) Bayern Munich
17	FW	Maurice Malone	17 August 2000 (aged 16)	(German Football Association) FC Augsburg
18	MF	**John Yeboah**	23 June 2000 (aged 16)	(German Football Association) VfL Wolfsburg

=== Republic of Ireland ===
Head coach: (Republic of Ireland) Colin O'Brien

No.	Pos.	Player	Date of birth (age)	Club
1	GK	Brian Maher	1 November 2000 (aged 16)	(Football Association of Ireland) St Patrick's Athletic
2	DF	**Lee O'Connor**	28 July 2000 (aged 16)	(The Football Association) Manchester United
3	DF	Kameron Ledwidge	7 April 2001 (aged 16)	(Football Association of Ireland) St Kevin's Boys
4	DF	Jordan Doherty	29 August 2000 (aged 16)	(The Football Association) Sheffield United
5	DF	**Nathan Collins**	30 April 2001 (aged 16)	(The Football Association) Stoke City
6	MF	Aaron Bolger	2 February 2000 (aged 17)	(Football Association of Ireland) Shamrock Rovers
7	MF	Luke Nolan	21 August 2000 (aged 16)	(Football Association of Ireland) St Patrick's Athletic
8	FW	Callum Thompson	20 April 2001 (aged 16)	(The Football Association) Wolverhampton Wanderers
9	FW	Rowan Roache	9 February 2000 (aged 17)	(The Football Association) Blackpool
10	FW	**Adam Idah**	11 February 2001 (aged 16)	(Football Association of Ireland) College Corinthians
11	FW	**Aaron Connolly**	28 January 2000 (aged 17)	(The Football Association) Brighton & Hove Albion
12	MF	Brandon Kavanagh	21 September 2000 (aged 16)	(Football Association of Ireland) Bohemians
13	DF	Daryl Walsh	14 June 2000 (aged 16)	(Football Association of Ireland) Waterford
14	MF	Richard O'Farrell	18 September 2000 (aged 16)	(Football Association of Ireland) St Patrick's Athletic
15	DF	Joe Redmond	23 January 2000 (aged 17)	(The Football Association) Birmingham City
16	GK	Kian Clarke	9 May 2001 (aged 15)	(Football Association of Ireland) Bohemians
17	MF	Gavin Kilkenny	1 February 2000 (aged 17)	(The Football Association) Bournemouth
18	MF	Tyreik Wright	22 September 2001 (aged 15)	(Football Association of Ireland) Lakewood

=== Serbia ===
Head coach: (Serbia) Perica Ognjenović

No.	Pos.	Player	Date of birth (age)	Club
1	GK	Miloš Gordić	5 March 2000 (aged 17)	(Football Association of Serbia) Red Star Belgrade
2	DF	Aleksandar Kostić	24 January 2000 (aged 17)	(Football Association of Serbia) Red Star Belgrade
3	DF	Zlatan Šehović	8 August 2000 (aged 16)	(Football Association of Serbia) Partizan
4	MF	**Ivan Ilić**	17 March 2001 (aged 16)	(Football Association of Serbia) Red Star Belgrade
5	DF	Svetozar Marković	23 March 2000 (aged 17)	(Football Association of Serbia) Partizan
6	DF	Jovan Vladimir Pavlović	11 February 2000 (aged 17)	(Football Association of Bosnia and Herzegovina) Sport Team Banja Luka
7	MF	Marko Janković	29 August 2000 (aged 16)	(Football Association of Serbia) Red Star Belgrade
8	MF	Željko Gavrić	5 December 2000 (aged 16)	(Football Association of Serbia) Red Star Belgrade
9	FW	Filip Stuparević	30 August 2000 (aged 16)	(Football Association of Serbia) Voždovac
10	MF	Armin Đerlek	15 July 2000 (aged 16)	(Football Association of Serbia) Partizan
11	MF	Mihajlo Nešković	9 February 2000 (aged 17)	(Football Association of Serbia) Vojvodina
12	GK	Aleksa Milojević	8 January 2000 (aged 17)	(Football Association of Serbia) Jagodina
14	MF	Vanja Zvekanov	25 May 2000 (aged 16)	(Football Association of Serbia) Spartak Subotica
15	FW	Jovan Kokir	25 April 2000 (aged 17)	(Football Association of Serbia) Partizan
16	DF	Dimitrije Kamenović	16 July 2000 (aged 16)	(Football Association of Serbia) Čukarički
17	MF	Milutin Vidosavljević	21 February 2001 (aged 16)	(Football Association of Serbia) Čukarički
18	FW	Slobodan Tedić	13 April 2000 (aged 17)	(Football Association of Serbia) Vojvodina
20	MF	Mateja Zuvić	13 February 2000 (aged 17)	(Football Association of Serbia) Partizan

=== Bosnia and Herzegovina ===
Head coach: (Bosnia and Herzegovina) Sakib Malkočević

No.	Pos.	Player	Date of birth (age)	Club
1	GK	Jasmin Krsic	2 March 2000 (aged 17)	(Football Association of Bosnia and Herzegovina) Željezničar
3	DF	Dobrica Tegeltija	6 October 2000 (aged 16)	(Football Association of Serbia) Vojvodina
2	DF	Enio Zilić	12 July 2000 (aged 16)	(Football Association of Bosnia and Herzegovina) Željezničar
4	DF	Dino-Samuel Kurbegović	21 December 2000 (aged 16)	(German Football Association) Mainz 05
5	DF	Rijad Sadiku	18 January 2000 (aged 17)	(Football Association of Bosnia and Herzegovina) Sarajevo
6	DF	**Jusuf Gazibegović**	11 March 2000 (aged 17)	(Austrian Football Association) Red Bull Salzburg
7	MF	Marko Brkić	11 April 2000 (aged 17)	(Football Association of Serbia) Red Star Belgrade
8	MF	Stefan Santrač	24 January 2000 (aged 17)	(Football Association of Serbia) Red Star Belgrade
9	MF	Džani Salčin	19 March 2000 (aged 17)	(Football Association of Bosnia and Herzegovina) Sarajevo
10	FW	Milan Šikanjić	3 January 2000 (aged 17)	(Football Association of Serbia) Red Star Belgrade
11	MF	Eldin Omerović	26 May 2000 (aged 16)	(Football Association of Bosnia and Herzegovina) Sloboda Tuzla
12	GK	Matej Perković	6 May 2000 (aged 16)	(Football Association of Bosnia and Herzegovina) Široki Brijeg
13	DF	Emir Sejdović	25 April 2000 (aged 17)	(German Football Association) FSV Frankfurt
14	MF	Armin Imamović	17 February 2000 (aged 17)	(Football Association of Bosnia and Herzegovina) Sarajevo
15	DF	Nemanja Vještica	1 February 2000 (aged 17)	(Football Association of Serbia) Partizan
16	MF	Domagoj Marušić	19 March 2000 (aged 17)	(Football Association of Bosnia and Herzegovina) Široki Brijeg
17	FW	Elvis Mehanović	10 April 2000 (aged 17)	(Royal Belgian Football Association) Genk
18	FW	Milan Savić	19 May 2000 (aged 16)	(Football Association of Serbia) Red Star Belgrade

== Group D ==
=== Netherlands ===
Head coach: (Netherlands) Kees Van Wonderen

No.	Pos.	Player	Date of birth (age)	Club
1	GK	Jasper Schendelaar	2 September 2000 (aged 16)	(Royal Dutch Football Association) AZ
2	DF	**Lutsharel Geertruida**	18 July 2000 (aged 16)	(Royal Dutch Football Association) Feyenoord
3	DF	Tijn Daverveld	29 April 2000 (aged 17)	(Royal Dutch Football Association) PSV Eindhoven
4	DF	Mitchel Bakker	20 June 2000 (aged 16)	(Royal Dutch Football Association) Ajax
5	DF	Kik Pierie	20 July 2000 (aged 16)	(Royal Dutch Football Association) Heerenveen
6	MF	Achraf El Bouchataoui	12 January 2000 (aged 17)	(Royal Dutch Football Association) Feyenoord
7	FW	Mohamed Mallahi	13 February 2000 (aged 17)	(Royal Dutch Football Association) Utrecht
8	MF	Dogucan Haspolat	11 February 2000 (aged 17)	(Royal Dutch Football Association) Excelsior
9	FW	Thomas Buitink	14 June 2000 (aged 16)	(Royal Dutch Football Association) Vitesse
10	MF	**Juan Familia Castillo**	13 January 2000 (aged 17)	(The Football Association) Chelsea
11	FW	**Zakaria Aboukhlal**	18 February 2000 (aged 17)	(Royal Dutch Football Association) Willem II
12	DF	Tommy St. Jago	3 January 2000 (aged 17)	(Royal Dutch Football Association) Utrecht
13	DF	Justin de Haas	1 February 2000 (aged 17)	(Royal Dutch Football Association) AZ
14	MF	Thijs Oosting	2 May 2000 (aged 17)	(Royal Dutch Football Association) AZ
15	MF	Andrew Mendonça	9 July 2000 (aged 16)	(Royal Dutch Football Association) PSV Eindhoven
16	GK	Fabian de Keijzer	10 May 2000 (aged 16)	(Royal Dutch Football Association) Utrecht
17	FW	**Myron Boadu**	14 January 2001 (aged 16)	(Royal Dutch Football Association) AZ
18	FW	Delano Ladan	9 February 2000 (aged 17)	(Royal Dutch Football Association) ADO Den Haag

=== Norway ===
Head coach: (Norway) Erland Johnsen

No.	Pos.	Player	Date of birth (age)	Club
1	GK	Mads Christiansen	21 October 2000 (aged 16)	(Norwegian Football Federation) Lillestrøm
2	DF	Fabian Rimestad	13 January 2000 (aged 17)	(Norwegian Football Federation) Fana
3	MF	Emil Kalsaas	7 July 2000 (aged 16)	(Norwegian Football Federation) Fyllingsdalen
4	MF	Colin Rösler	22 April 2000 (aged 17)	(The Football Association) Manchester City
5	DF	Erik Tobias Sandberg	27 February 2000 (aged 17)	(Norwegian Football Federation) Lillestrøm
6	MF	Johan Hove	7 September 2000 (aged 16)	(Norwegian Football Federation) Sogndal
7	MF	Mikael Ugland	24 January 2000 (aged 17)	(Norwegian Football Federation) Start
8	DF	Anders Waagan	18 February 2000 (aged 17)	(Norwegian Football Federation) Aalesunds
9	FW	Erik Botheim	10 January 2000 (aged 17)	(Norwegian Football Federation) Rosenborg
10	MF	**Jørgen Strand Larsen**	6 February 2000 (aged 17)	(Norwegian Football Federation) Sarpsborg 08
11	MF	**Håkon Evjen**	14 February 2000 (aged 17)	(Norwegian Football Federation) Bodø/Glimt
12	GK	Lars Kvarekvål	5 February 2000 (aged 17)	(Norwegian Football Federation) Stabæk
13	MF	Edvard Sandvik Tagseth	23 January 2001 (aged 16)	(The Football Association) Liverpool
14	FW	**Erling Haaland**	21 July 2000 (aged 16)	(Norwegian Football Federation) Molde
15	DF	Jesper Daland	6 January 2000 (aged 17)	(Norwegian Football Federation) Stabæk
16	MF	Halldor Stenevik	2 February 2000 (aged 17)	(Norwegian Football Federation) Brann
17	DF	Andreas Uran	1 February 2000 (aged 17)	(Norwegian Football Federation) Molde
18	MF	Elias Flø	16 January 2000 (aged 17)	(Norwegian Football Federation) Hødd

=== Ukraine ===
Head coach: (Ukraine) Serhiy Popov

No.	Pos.	Player	Date of birth (age)	Club
1	GK	Viktor Babichyn	22 August 2000 (aged 16)	(Ukrainian Association of Football) Dnipro
3	DF	Roman Slyva	23 September 2000 (aged 16)	(Ukrainian Association of Football) Dynamo Kyiv
4	DF	Ihor Snurnitsyn	7 March 2000 (aged 17)	(Ukrainian Association of Football) Olimpik Donetsk
5	DF	**Oleksandr Syrota**	11 June 2000 (aged 16)	(Ukrainian Association of Football) Dynamo Kyiv
7	FW	Vladyslav Supriaha	15 February 2000 (aged 17)	(Ukrainian Association of Football) Dnipro
8	MF	Oleksiy Kashchuk	29 June 2000 (aged 16)	(Ukrainian Association of Football) Shakhtar Donetsk
9	MF	Artur Vashchyshyn	11 June 2000 (aged 16)	(Ukrainian Association of Football) Dynamo Kyiv
10	MF	**Heorhiy Tsitaishvili**	18 November 2000 (aged 16)	(Ukrainian Association of Football) Dynamo Kyiv
11	FW	Yevhen Isayenko	7 August 2000 (aged 16)	(Ukrainian Association of Football) Dynamo Kyiv
12	GK	Junior Ltaif Dani	1 May 2000 (aged 17)	(Ukrainian Association of Football) Olimpik Donetsk
13	DF	Illya Malyshkin	10 March 2000 (aged 17)	(Ukrainian Association of Football) Dynamo Kyiv
14	MF	Mykyta Tytaievskyi	13 January 2000 (aged 17)	(Ukrainian Association of Football) Chornomorets Odesa
15	MF	Petro Kharzhevskyi	3 January 2000 (aged 17)	(Ukrainian Association of Football) Metalist Kharkiv
16	MF	Vikentiy Voloshyn	17 April 2001 (aged 16)	(Ukrainian Association of Football) Dynamo Kyiv
17	FW	Artem Kholod	22 January 2000 (aged 17)	(Ukrainian Association of Football) Shakhtar Donetsk
18	MF	Bohdan Biloshevskyi	12 January 2000 (aged 17)	(Ukrainian Association of Football) Dynamo Kyiv
19	DF	Bohdan Kurtyak	11 March 2000 (aged 17)	(Ukrainian Association of Football) Karpaty Lviv
22	MF	Vadym Mashchenko	26 July 2000 (aged 16)	(Ukrainian Association of Football) Dynamo Kyiv

=== England ===
Head coach: (Wales) Steve Cooper

No.	Pos.	Player	Date of birth (age)	Club
1	GK	Josef Bursik	12 July 2000 (aged 16)	(The Football Association) AFC Wimbledon
2	DF	TJ Eyoma	29 January 2000 (aged 17)	(The Football Association) Tottenham Hotspur
3	DF	Lewis Gibson	19 July 2000 (aged 16)	(The Football Association) Newcastle United
4	MF	George McEachran	30 August 2000 (aged 16)	(The Football Association) Chelsea
5	DF	**Marc Guehi**	13 July 2000 (aged 16)	(The Football Association) Chelsea
6	DF	Jonathan Panzo	25 October 2000 (aged 16)	(The Football Association) Chelsea
7	FW	**Phil Foden**	28 May 2000 (aged 16)	(The Football Association) Manchester City
8	MF	Tashan Oakley-Boothe	14 February 2000 (aged 17)	(The Football Association) Tottenham Hotspur
9	FW	Rhian Brewster	1 April 2000 (aged 17)	(The Football Association) Liverpool
10	FW	**Callum Hudson-Odoi**	7 November 2000 (aged 16)	(The Football Association) Chelsea
11	FW	**Jadon Sancho**	25 March 2000 (aged 17)	(The Football Association) Manchester City
12	MF	Reo Griffiths	27 June 2000 (aged 16)	(The Football Association) Tottenham Hotspur
13	GK	Curtis Anderson	27 September 2000 (aged 16)	(The Football Association) Manchester City
14	DF	Jake Vokins	17 March 2000 (aged 17)	(The Football Association) Southampton
15	MF	Alexander Denny	12 April 2000 (aged 17)	(The Football Association) Everton
16	FW	**Danny Loader**	28 August 2000 (aged 16)	(The Football Association) Reading
17	MF	Aidan Barlow	10 January 2000 (aged 17)	(The Football Association) Manchester United
18	FW	**Emile Smith Rowe**	28 July 2000 (aged 16)	(The Football Association) Arsenal
19	DF	**Joel Latibeaudiere**	6 January 2000 (aged 17)	(The Football Association) Manchester City

1. Joel Latibeaudiere was called up during the tournament due to an injury to Tashan Oakley-Boothe.
