= 2017 UEFA European Under-17 Championship =

UEFA U-17 Europsko prvenstvo 2017.

Tournament details
- Host country: Croatia
- Dates: 3–19 May
- Teams: 16 (from 1 confederation)
- Venue: 7 (in 6 host cities)

Final positions
- Champions: Spain (9th title)
- Runners-up: England

Tournament statistics
- Matches played: 32
- Goals scored: 99 (3.09 per match)
- Attendance: 43,063 (1,346 per match)
- Top scorer: (France) Amine Gouiri (8 goals)
- Best player: (England) Jadon Sancho

The 2017 UEFA European Under-17 Championship (also known as UEFA Under-17 Euro 2017) was the 16th edition of the UEFA European Under-17 Championship (35th edition if the Under-16 era is also included), the annual international youth football championship organised by UEFA for the men's under-17 national teams of Europe. Croatia, which were selected by UEFA on 26 January 2015, hosted the tournament.

A total of 16 teams played in the tournament, with players born on or after 1 January 2000 eligible to participate. Each match had a duration of 80 minutes, consisting of two halves of 40 minutes with a 15-minute half-time.

Same as previous editions held in odd-numbered years, the tournament acted as the UEFA qualifiers for the FIFA U-17 World Cup. The top five teams of the tournament qualified for the 2017 FIFA U-17 World Cup in India as the UEFA representatives. This was decreased from the previous six teams, as FIFA decided to give one of the slots originally reserved for UEFA to the Oceania Football Confederation starting from 2017.

Spain won their record-extending ninth title by beating England 4–1 on penalties in the final after a 2–2 draw, and both teams were joined by Germany, Turkey, France as UEFA qualifiers for the 2017 FIFA U-17 World Cup. Portugal were the defending champions, but failed to qualify.

== Qualification ==
All 54 UEFA nations entered the competition, and with the hosts Croatia qualifying automatically, the other 53 teams competed in the qualifying competition to determine the remaining 15 spots in the final tournament. The qualifying competition consisted of two rounds: Qualifying round, which took place in autumn 2016, and Elite round, which took place in spring 2017.

=== Qualified teams ===
The following 16 teams qualified for the final tournament.

Note: All appearance statistics include only U-17 era (since 2002).

Team	Method of qualification	Finals appearance	Last appearance	Previous best performance
Croatia	Hosts	4th	2015	Fourth place (2005)
Germany	Elite round Group 1 winners	10th	2016	Champions (2009)
Turkey	Elite round Group 1 runners-up	7th	2014	Champions (2005)
Hungary	Elite round Group 2 winners	4th	2006	Group stage (2002, 2003, 2006)
Norway	Elite round Group 2 runners-up	1st	—	Debut
Spain	Elite round Group 3 winners	11th	2016	Champions (2007, 2008)
Scotland	Elite round Group 4 winners	5th	2016	Semi-finals (2014)
Serbia	Elite round Group 4 runners-up	6th	2016	Quarter-finals (2002)
Netherlands	Elite round Group 5 winners	11th	2016	Champions (2011, 2012)
Italy	Elite round Group 5 runners-up	7th	2016	Runners-up (2013)
France	Elite round Group 6 winners	11th	2016	Champions (2004, 2015)
Ukraine	Elite round Group 6 runners-up	6th	2016	Group stage (2002, 2004, 2007, 2013, 2016)
England	Elite round Group 7 winners	12th	2016	Champions (2010, 2014)
Bosnia and Herzegovina	Elite round Group 7 runners-up	2nd	2016	Group stage (2016)
Republic of Ireland	Elite round Group 8 winners	3rd	2015	Group stage (2008, 2015)
Faroe Islands	Elite round Group 8 runners-up	1st	—	Debut

Notes

1. The best seven runners-up among all eight elite round groups qualified for the final tournament.

=== Final draw ===
The final draw was held on 3 April 2017, 18:00 CEST (UTC+2), at the Panorama Zagreb Hotel in Zagreb, Croatia. The 16 teams were drawn into four groups of four teams. Hosts Croatia were assigned to position A1 in the draw, while the other teams were seeded according to their results in the qualification elite round, with the seven best elite round group winners (counting all elite round results) placed in Pot 1 and drawn to positions 1 and 2 in the groups, and the remaining eight teams (the eighth-best elite round group winner and the seven elite round group runners-up) placed in Pot 2 and drawn to positions 3 and 4 in the groups.

Pos	Grp	Team	Pld	W	D	L	GF	GA	GD	Pts	Seeding
1	—	Croatia (H)	0	0	0	0	0	0	0	0	Host (A1)
2	1	Germany	3	3	0	0	19	4	+15	9	Pot 1
3	7	England	3	3	0	0	10	3	+7	9	Pot 1
4	4	Scotland	3	3	0	0	8	1	+7	9	Pot 1
5	8	Republic of Ireland	3	3	0	0	7	0	+7	9	Pot 1
6	5	Netherlands	3	3	0	0	7	3	+4	9	Pot 1
7	6	France	3	2	1	0	6	2	+4	7	Pot 1
8	3	Spain	3	2	0	1	5	2	+3	6	Pot 1
9	2	Hungary	3	2	0	1	3	2	+1	6	Pot 2
10	1	Turkey	3	2	0	1	11	4	+7	6	Pot 2
11	5	Italy	3	2	0	1	5	2	+3	6	Pot 2
12	4	Serbia	3	2	0	1	3	2	+1	6	Pot 2
13	6	Ukraine	3	2	0	1	5	5	0	6	Pot 2
14	2	Norway	3	1	1	1	5	3	+2	4	Pot 2
15	7	Bosnia and Herzegovina	3	1	1	1	2	2	0	4	Pot 2
16	8	Faroe Islands	3	1	1	1	2	5	−3	4	Pot 2

Source: UEFA
Rules for classification: 1) points; 2) goal difference; 3) goals scored; 4) disciplinary points; 5) coefficient; 6) drawing of lots.
(H) Hosts

== Venues ==
At first, it was announced that eight stadiums would host the competition, each of those being in Istria and Primorje. Later, that was changed.

Rijeka and Kostrena were the only hosts that were planned at first with new hosts being Varaždin, Zaprešić, Velika Gorica and two in Croatian capital Zagreb – in boroughs Sesvete and Lučko. The final would be played in Varaždin.

2017 UEFA European Under-17 Championship is located in Croatia	Varaždin	Velika Gorica	Rijeka
2017 UEFA European Under-17 Championship is located in Croatia	Stadion Varteks	Stadion Radnik	Stadion Rujevica
2017 UEFA European Under-17 Championship is located in Croatia	Capacity: 8,918	Capacity: 3,328	Capacity: 5,642
Zaprešić	Kostrena	Zagreb	
Stadion ŠRC Zaprešić	Stadion Žuknica	Stadion Lučko (Lučko)	Stadion sv. Josipa Radnika (Sesvete)
Capacity: 3,519	Capacity: 2,416	Capacity: 1,290	Capacity: 927

== Match officials ==
A total of 9 referees, 12 assistant referees and 3 fourth officials were appointed for the final tournament.

Referees

- (Austria) Dominik Ouschan
- (Belgium) Nicolas Laforge
- (Croatia) Fran Jović
- (Cyprus) Dimitrios Massias
- (Denmark) Jens Maae
- (Greece) Anastasios Papapetrou
- (Lithuania) Donatas Rumšas
- (Portugal) Fábio Veríssimo
- (Sweden) Mohammed Al-Hakim

Assistant referees

- (Armenia) Atom Sevgulyan
- (Czech Republic) Radek Kotik
- (Finland) Mika Lamppu
- (Israel) Idan Yarkoni
- (Kazakhstan) Samat Tergeussizov
- (Latvia) Jevgeņijs Morozovs
- (North Macedonia) Goce Petreski
- (Northern Ireland) Paul Robinson
- (Andorra) Manuel Fernandes
- (Romania) Mircea Grigoriu
- (Russia) Aleksei Vorontsov
- (Wales) Ian Bird

Fourth officials

- (Croatia) Tihomir Pejin
- (Croatia) Duje Strukan
- (Croatia) Mario Zebec

== Squads ==
Each national team submitted a squad of 18 players.

== Group stage ==
The final tournament schedule was confirmed on 7 April 2017.

The group winners and runners-up advance to the quarter-finals.

Tiebreakers

The teams are ranked according to points (3 points for a win, 1 point for a draw, 0 points for a loss). If two or more teams are equal on points on completion of the group matches, the following tie-breaking criteria are applied, in the order given, to determine the rankings (Regulations Articles 17.01 and 17.02):

1. Higher number of points obtained in the group matches played among the teams in question;
2. Superior goal difference resulting from the group matches played among the teams in question;
3. Higher number of goals scored in the group matches played among the teams in question;
4. If, after having applied criteria 1 to 3, teams still have an equal ranking, criteria 1 to 3 are reapplied exclusively to the group matches between the teams in question to determine their final rankings. If this procedure does not lead to a decision, criteria 5 to 9 apply;
5. Superior goal difference in all group matches;
6. Higher number of goals scored in all group matches;
7. If only two teams have the same number of points, and they are tied according to criteria 1 to 6 after having met in the last round of the group stage, their rankings are determined by a penalty shoot-out (not used if more than two teams have the same number of points, or if their rankings are not relevant for qualification for the next stage).
8. Lower disciplinary points total based only on yellow and red cards received in the group matches (red card = 3 points, yellow card = 1 point, expulsion for two yellow cards in one match = 3 points);
9. Higher position in the coefficient ranking list used for the qualifying round draw;
10. Drawing of lots.

All times are local, CEST (UTC+2).

=== Group A ===
Pos	Team	Pld	W	D	L	GF	GA	GD	Pts	Qualification
1	Spain	3	2	1	0	7	4	+3	7	Knockout stage
2	Turkey	3	2	0	1	8	5	+3	6	Knockout stage
3	Italy	3	1	0	2	3	5	−2	3	
4	Croatia (H)	3	0	1	2	2	6	−4	1	

Source: UEFA
Rules for classification: Group stage tiebreakers
(H) Hosts
3 May 2017
13:15

Turkey	2–3	Spain
Güneş 5'; Karaahmet 11'	Report	S. Gómez 24'; Ruiz 33' (pen.); Morey 72'

Stadion Rujevica, Rijeka
Attendance: 300
Referee: Dominik Ouschan (Austria)
3 May 2017
17:45

Croatia	0–1	Italy
	Report	Kean 78'

Stadion Rujevica, Rijeka
Attendance: 4,092
Referee: Fábio Veríssimo (Portugal)

6 May 2017
13:15

Croatia	1–4	Turkey
Marin 67'	Report	Karaahmet 18'; Gül 49'; Kabak 69'; Akgün 80'

Stadion Rujevica, Rijeka
Attendance: 1,004
Referee: Nicolas Laforge (Belgium)
6 May 2017
17:45

Spain	3–1	Italy
S. Gómez 36'; Ruiz 68' (pen.), 80'	Report	Caviglia 80+2'

Stadion Rujevica, Rijeka
Attendance: 744
Referee: Anastasios Papapetrou (Greece)

9 May 2017
12:00

Spain	1–1	Croatia
Blanco 80+1'	Report	Čolina 56'

Stadion Žuknica, Kostrena
Attendance: 1,121
Referee: Mohammed Al-Hakim (Sweden)
9 May 2017
12:00

Italy	1–2	Turkey
Pellegri 15'	Report	Karaahmet 5'; Babacan 74'

Stadion Rujevica, Rijeka
Attendance: 700
Referee: Jens Maae (Denmark)

=== Group B ===
Pos	Team	Pld	W	D	L	GF	GA	GD	Pts	Qualification
1	Hungary	3	2	1	0	8	3	+5	7	Knockout stage
2	France	3	2	0	1	11	4	+7	6	Knockout stage
3	Scotland	3	1	1	1	4	3	+1	4	
4	Faroe Islands	3	0	0	3	0	13	−13	0	

Source: UEFA
Rules for classification: Group stage tiebreakers
3 May 2017
12:00

Scotland	2–0	Faroe Islands
Cameron 59'; Aitchison 68'	Report

Stadion Lučko, Zagreb
Attendance: 511
Referee: Donatas Rumšas (Lithuania)
3 May 2017
14:00

Hungary	3–2	France
Csoboth 38', 41'; Bencze 52'	Report	Gouiri 36', 80+4' (pen.)

Stadion Radnik, Velika Gorica
Attendance: 892
Referee: Dimitrios Massias (Cyprus)

6 May 2017
12:00

France	7–0	Faroe Islands
Gouiri 1', 10', 33'; Caqueret 4', 46'; Picouleau 15'; Adli 54'	Report

Stadion ŠRC Zaprešić, Zaprešić
Attendance: 712
Referee: Jens Maae (Denmark)
6 May 2017
16:00

Scotland	1–1	Hungary
Rudden 30'	Report	Szerető 52'

Stadion Lučko, Zagreb
Attendance: 677
Referee: Mohammed Al-Hakim (Sweden)

9 May 2017
16:00

France	2–1	Scotland
Gouiri 35', 80'	Report	Rudden 42'

Stadion Radnik, Velika Gorica
Attendance: 511
Referee: Nicolas Laforge (Belgium)
9 May 2017
16:00

Faroe Islands	0–4	Hungary
	Report	Torvund 24'; Szoboszlai 26', 48'; Edmundsson 29' (o.g.)

Stadion Lučko, Zagreb
Attendance: 409
Referee: Fran Jović (Croatia)

=== Group C ===
Pos	Team	Pld	W	D	L	GF	GA	GD	Pts	Qualification
1	Germany	3	3	0	0	15	1	+14	9	Knockout stage
2	Republic of Ireland	3	1	0	2	2	9	−7	3 (Note: Head-to-head points: Ireland 3, Bosnia and Herzegovina 3, Serbia 3. Head-to-head goal scored: Ireland 2, Bosnia and Herzegovina 2, Serbia 1. Head-to-head record between Ireland and Bosnia and Herzegovina: Ireland 3, Bosnia and Herzegovina 0)	Knockout stage
3	Bosnia and Herzegovina	3	1	0	2	2	7	−5	3	
4	Serbia	3	1	0	2	2	4	−2	3	

Source: UEFA
Rules for classification: Group stage tiebreakers
Notes:
4 May 2017
12:00

Germany	5–0	Bosnia and Herzegovina
Mai 2'; Keitel 16'; Arp 50', 51', 62'	Report

Stadion Žuknica, Kostrena
Attendance: 1,192
Referee: Nicolas Laforge (Belgium)
4 May 2017
16:30

Serbia	1–0	Republic of Ireland
Gavrić 72'	Report

Stadion Žuknica, Kostrena
Attendance: 482
Referee: Anastasios Papapetrou (Greece)

7 May 2017
12:00

Germany	3–1	Serbia
Abouchabaka 7' (pen.); Yeboah 39'; Majetschak 61'	Report	Stuparević 75' (pen.)

Stadion Žuknica, Kostrena
Attendance: 587
Referee: Dominik Ouschan (Austria)
7 May 2017
16:30

Republic of Ireland	2–1	Bosnia and Herzegovina
Roache 7'; Idah 29' (pen.)	Report	Vještica 13'

Stadion Žuknica, Kostrena
Attendance: 500
Referee: Fábio Veríssimo (Portugal)

10 May 2017
12:00

Republic of Ireland	0–7	Germany
	Report	Abouchabaka 8'; Arp 15', 45', 49'; O'Connor 21' (o.g.); Awuku 73'; Hottmann 76'

Stadion Rujevica, Rijeka
Attendance: 434
Referee: Fábio Veríssimo (Portugal)
10 May 2017
12:00

Bosnia and Herzegovina	1–0	Serbia
Imamović 80'	Report

Stadion Žuknica, Kostrena
Attendance: 504
Referee: Donatas Rumšas (Lithuania)

=== Group D ===
Pos	Team	Pld	W	D	L	GF	GA	GD	Pts	Qualification
1	England	3	3	0	0	10	1	+9	9	Knockout stage
2	Netherlands	3	1	1	1	3	5	−2	4	Knockout stage
3	Ukraine	3	1	0	2	2	5	−3	3	
4	Norway	3	0	1	2	3	7	−4	1	

Source: UEFA
Rules for classification: Group stage tiebreakers
4 May 2017
12:00

Netherlands	1–0	Ukraine
El Bouchataoui 61'	Report

Stadion sv. Josipa Radnika, Zagreb
Attendance: 881
Referee: Jens Maae (Denmark)
4 May 2017
14:00

Norway	1–3	England
Guehi 8' (o.g.)	Report	Brewster 10', 35'; Foden 78'

Stadion Radnik, Velika Gorica
Attendance: 713
Referee: Mohammed Al-Hakim (Sweden)

7 May 2017
14:00

England	4–0	Ukraine
McEachran 20'; Brewster 32'; Sancho 36'; Barlow 69'	Report

Stadion sv. Josipa Radnika, Zagreb
Attendance: 663
Referee: Donatas Rumšas (Lithuania)
7 May 2017
17:45

Netherlands	2–2	Norway
Aboukhlal 11'; El Bouchataoui 80+2' (pen.)	Report	Larsen 50'; Stenevik 55'

Stadion Radnik, Velika Gorica
Attendance: 699
Referee: Dimitrios Massias (Cyprus)

10 May 2017
16:00

England	3–0	Netherlands
Sancho 23', 48' (pen.); Hudson-Odoi 80'	Report

Stadion ŠRC Zaprešić, Zaprešić
Attendance: 1,054
Referee: Anastasios Papapetrou (Greece)
10 May 2017
16:00

Ukraine	2–0	Norway
Kashchuk 78'; Kholod 80+1'	Report

Stadion sv. Josipa Radnika, Zagreb
Attendance: 719
Referee: Dominik Ouschan (Austria)

== Knockout stage ==
In the knockout stage, penalty shoot-out is used to decide the winner if necessary (no extra time is played).

As part of a trial sanctioned by the IFAB to reduce the advantage of the team shooting first in a penalty shoot-out, a different sequence of taking penalties, known as "ABBA", that mirrors the serving sequence in a tennis tiebreak would be used if a penalty shoot-out was needed (team A kicks first, team B kicks second):

Original sequence
AB AB AB AB AB (sudden death starts) AB AB etc.
Trial sequence
AB BA AB BA AB (sudden death starts) BA AB etc.

=== Bracket ===
Quarter-finals
12 May – Varaždin
Spain	3
France	1
13 May – Zaprešić
Germany	2
Netherlands	1
12 May – Velika Gorica
Hungary	0
Turkey	1
13 May – Velika Gorica
England	1
Republic of Ireland	0

Semi-finals
16 May – Varaždin
Spain (p)	0 (4)
Germany	0 (2)
16 May – Zaprešić
Turkey	1
England	2

Final
19 May – Varaždin
Spain (p)	2 (4)
England	2 (1)
World Cup play-off
16 May – Zagreb
Hungary	0
France	1

=== Quarter-finals ===
Winners qualified for 2017 FIFA U-17 World Cup. The two best losing quarter-finalists entered the FIFA U-17 World Cup play-off.

12 May 2017
12:00

Hungary	0–1	Turkey
	Report	Csonka 20' (o.g.)

Stadion Radnik, Velika Gorica
Attendance: 897
Referee: Donatas Rumšas (Lithuania)

12 May 2017
17:45

Spain	3–1	France
Morey 17'; Ruiz 35' (pen.); S. Gómez 56'	Report	Gouiri 9'

Stadion Varteks, Varaždin
Attendance: 5,163
Referee: Fran Jović (Croatia)

13 May 2017
12:00

England	1–0	Republic of Ireland
Sancho 13'	Report

Stadion Radnik, Velika Gorica
Attendance: 879
Referee: Nicolas Laforge (Belgium)

13 May 2017
17:45

Germany	2–1	Netherlands
Abouchabaka 66'; Arp 79'	Report	Aboukhlal 40+1'

Stadion ŠRC Zaprešić, Zaprešić
Attendance: 1,013
Referee: Mohammed Al-Hakim (Sweden)

==== Ranking of losing quarter-finalists ====
To determine the two best losing quarter-finalists which enter the FIFA U-17 World Cup play-off, the losing quarter-finalists are ranked by the following criteria (Regulations Article 16.06):

1. Higher position in the group stage (i.e., group winners ahead of group runners-up);
2. Better results in the group stage (i.e., points, goal difference, goals scored);
3. Better results in the quarter-finals (i.e., points, goal difference, goals scored);
4. Lower disciplinary points in the group stage and quarter-finals combined;
5. Higher position in the coefficient ranking list used for the qualifying round draw;
6. Drawing of lots.

Pos	Grp	Team	Pld	W	D	L	GF	GA	GD	Pts	Qualification
1	B1	Hungary	3	2	1	0	8	3	+5	7	FIFA U-17 World Cup play-off
2	B2	France	3	2	0	1	11	4	+7	6	FIFA U-17 World Cup play-off
3	D2	Netherlands	3	1	1	1	3	5	−2	4	
4	C2	Republic of Ireland	3	1	0	2	2	9	−7	3	

Source: UEFA

=== FIFA U-17 World Cup play-off ===
Winner qualified for 2017 FIFA U-17 World Cup.

16 May 2017
12:00

Hungary	0–1	France
	Report	Gouiri 26'

Stadion sv. Josipa Radnika, Zagreb
Attendance: 950
Referee: Anastasios Papapetrou (Greece)

=== Semi-finals ===
16 May 2017
17:45

Turkey	1–2	England
Kesgin 40+13'	Report	Hudson-Odoi 11'; Sancho 37'

Stadion ŠRC Zaprešić, Zaprešić
Attendance: 1,292
Referee: Fábio Veríssimo (Portugal)

16 May 2017
20:30

Spain	0–0	Germany
	Report
Penalties
Ruiz (penalty scored); Morey (penalty scored); Segovia (penalty missed); Chust (penalty scored); Guillamón (penalty scored)	4–2	(penalty missed) Majetschak; (penalty scored) Arp; (penalty missed) Mai; (penalty scored) Keitel

Stadion Varteks, Varaždin
Attendance: 4,581
Referee: Dominik Ouschan (Austria)

=== Final ===
19 May 2017
20:00

Spain	2–2	England
Morey 38'; Díaz 80+6'	Report	Hudson-Odoi 18'; Foden 58'
Penalties
Ruiz (penalty scored); Morey (penalty scored); S. Gómez (penalty scored); Chust (penalty scored)	4–1	(penalty scored) Barlow; (penalty missed) Brewster; (penalty missed) Latibeaudiere

Stadion Varteks, Varaždin
Attendance: 8,187
Referee: Jens Maae (Denmark)

== Goalscorers ==
There were 99 goals scored in 32 matches, for an average of 3.09 goals per match.

9 goals

- (France) Amine Gouiri (Note: UEFA considers Amine Gouiri to have scored eight goals in the final tournament, as his goal in the FIFA U-17 World Cup play-off is not considered part of the final tournament tally.)

7 goals

- (Germany) Jann-Fiete Arp

5 goals

- (England) Jadon Sancho

4 goals

- (Spain) Abel Ruiz

3 goals

- (England) Rhian Brewster
- (England) Callum Hudson-Odoi
- (Germany) Elias Abouchabaka
- (Spain) Sergio Gómez
- (Spain) Mateu Morey
- (Turkey) Malik Karaahmet

2 goals

- (England) Phil Foden
- (France) Maxence Caqueret
- (Hungary) Kevin Csoboth
- (Hungary) Dominik Szoboszlai
- (Netherlands) Zakaria Aboukhlal
- (Netherlands) Achraf El Bouchataoui
- (Scotland) Zak Rudden

1 goal

- (Bosnia and Herzegovina) Armin Imamović
- (Bosnia and Herzegovina) Nemanja Vještica
- (Croatia) David Čolina
- (Croatia) Antonio Marin
- (England) Aidan Barlow
- (England) George McEachran
- (France) Yacine Adli
- (France) Mathis Picouleau
- (Germany) Noah Awuku
- (Germany) Eric Hottmann
- (Germany) Yannik Keitel
- (Germany) Lars Lukas Mai
- (Germany) Erik Majetschak
- (Germany) John Yeboah
- (Hungary) Márk Bencze
- (Hungary) Krisztofer Szerető
- (Hungary) Alexander Torvund
- (Italy) Hans Nicolussi Caviglia
- (Italy) Moise Kean
- (Italy) Pietro Pellegri
- (Norway) Jørgen Strand Larsen
- (Norway) Halldor Stenevik
- (Republic of Ireland) Adam Idah
- (Republic of Ireland) Rowan Roache
- (Scotland) Jack Aitchison
- (Scotland) Innes Cameron
- (Serbia) Željko Gavrić
- (Serbia) Filip Stuparević
- (Spain) Antonio Blanco
- (Spain) Nacho Díaz
- (Turkey) Yunus Akgün
- (Turkey) Atalay Babacan
- (Turkey) Recep Gül
- (Turkey) Umut Güneş
- (Turkey) Ozan Kabak
- (Turkey) Kerem Kesgin
- (Ukraine) Oleksiy Kashchuk
- (Ukraine) Artem Kholod

1 own goal

- (England) Marc Guehi (against Norway)
- (Faroe Islands) Andrias Edmundsson (against Hungary)
- (Hungary) András Csonka (against Turkey)
- (Republic of Ireland) Lee O'Connor (against Germany)

Source: UEFA.com

== Team of the Tournament ==
Goalkeepers

- (Croatia) Dominik Kotarski
- (Spain) Álvaro Fernández

Defenders

- (England) Marc Guehi
- (England) Jonathan Panzo
- (France) Hakim Guenouche
- (Germany) Jan Boller
- (Spain) Víctor Chust
- (Spain) Mateu Morey

Midfielders

- (England) Callum Hudson-Odoi
- (England) George McEachran
- (France) Claudio Gomes
- (Germany) Elias Abouchabaka
- (Spain) Moha
- (Turkey) Atalay Babacan

Forwards

- (England) Phil Foden
- (England) Jadon Sancho
- (France) Amine Gouiri
- (Spain) Abel Ruiz

Source: UEFA Technical Report

== Qualified teams for FIFA U-17 World Cup ==
The following five teams from UEFA qualified for the 2017 FIFA U-17 World Cup.

Team	Qualified on	Previous appearances in tournament^{1}
Spain	12 May 2017	8 (1991, 1995, 1997, 1999, 2001, 2003, 2007, 2009)
England	13 May 2017	3 (2007, 2011, 2015)
Turkey	12 May 2017	2 (2005, 2009)
Germany	13 May 2017	9 (1985, 1991, 1995, 1997, 1999, 2007, 2009, 2011, 2015)
France	16 May 2017	5 (1987, **2001**, 2007, 2011, 2015)

^{1} Bold indicates champion for that year. Italic indicates host for that year.
