= Bellodi =

Bellodi is an Italian surname. Notable people with the surname include:

- Gabriele Bellodi (born 2000), Italian footballer
- Mirko Bellodi (born 1973), Italian footballer
