= Luca Mondini =

Italian footballer

Personal information
- Date of birth: 25 February 1970 (age 56)
- Place of birth: Parma, Italy
- Height: 1.82 m (5 ft 11 1/2 in)
- Position: Goalkeeper

Youth career
- 1989–1990: Internazionale

Senior career*
Years	Team	Apps	(Gls)
1990–1995	Internazionale	0	(0)
1990–1992	→ Spezia (loan)	67	(0)
1992–1993	→ Como (loan)	32	(0)
1993–1994	→ Andria (loan)	38	(0)
1995–1997	Vicenza	64	(0)
1997–1998	Treviso	27	(0)
1998–2001	Napoli	24	(0)
1999–2000	→ Lazio (loan)	0	(0)
2001–2002	Sampdoria	33	(0)
2002–2004	Reggiana	45	(0)
2004–2006	Cremonese	44	(0)
2007	Spezia	2	(0)
2007–2008	Padova	3	(0)
2008–2009	Benevento	12	(0)
2009–2010	Crociati Noceto	23	(0)
Total		414	(0)
- * Club domestic league appearances and goals

Luca Mondini (born 25 February 1970) is a former Italian footballer who played as a goalkeeper.

== Career ==
Mondini started his professional career at Internazionale. After he was loaned to Serie C1 clubs, he joined Vicenza which newly promoted to Serie A in mid-1995, replacing Giorgio Sterchele who left for A.S. Roma. He was the first choice ahead Pierluigi Brivio until the start of the 1997–98 season, but Brivio was preferred in goal when Vicenza won the 1996–97 Coppa Italia. In November 1997, he joined Treviso of Serie B. In mid-1998 he joined Napoli, ahead Giuseppe Taglialatela and Ferdinando Coppola as first choice. In September 1999, he was loaned to Lazio as Napoli signed Alessio Bandieri. At Lazio, he was the 3rd goalkeeper behind Luca Marchegiani and Marco Ballotta. Returned to Napoli, now newly promoted to Serie A, he worked as backup of Francesco Mancini and Alberto Fontana. In mid-2001, he joined Sampdoria of Serie B, as a replacement for Matteo Sereni following his departure from the club. In 2002, he left for Reggiana in Serie C1.

He then played for Cremonese since 2004, with which he won the Serie C1 championship. But in next season, now at Serie B, he shared the first choice role with Giorgio Bianchi. After the relegation of Cremonese, he did not play for the club and in January 2007 he joined Spezia as Nicola Santoni's backup, replacing Ivano Rotoli who left for Monza. In mid-2007, he joined Padova at Serie C1, behind Andrea Cano as backup. In mid-2008, he joined Benevento, a club which were newly promoted to Prima Divisione, sharing the first choice role with Pier Graziano Gori. In mid-2009, he joined Crociati Noceto which were newly promoted to Seconda Divisione, located in Noceto, Province of Parma.

== Honours ==
Vicenza

- Coppa Italia: 1996–97

Cremonese

- Serie C1: 2004–05
