= Andrea Ivan =

Italian footballer (born 1973)

Personal information
- Date of birth: 9 January 1973 (age 53)
- Place of birth: Florence, Italy
- Height: 1.82 m (6 ft 0 in)
- Position: Goalkeeper

Senior career*
| Years | Team | Apps | (Gls) |
| 1992–1994 | Poggibonsi | 36 | (0) |
| 1994–1995 | Ascoli | 3 | (0) |
| 1995–1997 | Siena | 59 | (0) |
| 1997 | Foggia | 0 | (0) |
| 1997–2000 | Salernitana | 15 | (0) |
| 2000–2002 | Livorno | 78 | (0) |
| 2002–2004 | Fiorentina | 34 | (0) |
| 2004–2005 | Pescara | 25 | (0) |
| 2005–2008 | Atalanta | 4 | (0) |
| 2009 | Mapello | | |
| 2009–2010 | Ibiza-Eivissa | 6 | (0) |
| 2010–2011 | Castelfranco S.R. | 4 | (0) |
| 2012 | FiesoleCaldine | | |
| 2012 | Scandicci | 8 | |
| 2012–2014 | FiesoleCaldine | 44 | |
| 2014–2015 | Audax Rufina | | |

Managerial career
- 2014–: Sporting Arno
- * Club domestic league appearances and goals

Andrea Ivan (born 9 January 1973) is an Italian association football coach and former player who used to play as goalkeeper. He works as a goalkeeping coach for Sporting Arno, an amateur football club of Florence.

== Career ==
=== Early career ===
Born in Florence, Ivan started his professional career at home region Tuscany, for Poggibonsi at Serie C2. He became the regular starter in the 2nd season, played all 34 matches. In mid-1994, he was signed by Ascoli of Serie B, where he worked as Marco Bizzarri's backup. He then back to Tuscany for A.C. Siena, by-then at Serie C1, played 59 matches in 2 seasons.

=== Salernitana ===
At the start of 1997–98 season, he joined Foggia, but in November to Salernitana, as Daniele Balli's backup. In 1999–2000 season, Salernitana signed Fabrizio Lorieri and Lorenzo Squizzi to replace the left for Balli, made him became 1 of the 5 goalkeepers, along with youth products Rosario Niosi and Crescenzo De Vito.

=== Livorno & Fiorentina ===
In January 2000, he left for Livorno, by-then at Serie C1. At Livorno, he quickly became first choice, ahead of Silvio Lafuenti. In mid-2002, he left for hometown club, newly found Serie C2 team Florentia Viola, which AC Fiorentina went bankrupt (And Livorno and Fiorentina became regional rival in Serie A due to both team from Tuscany). He played all 34 league matches and La viola was the fewest goals concerned team. After Fiorentina was invited to play Serie B in 2003–04 season, Ivan became backup again, behind Sebastián Cejas.

=== Pescara & Atalanta ===
The team promoted beck to Serie A at the end of season, and Ivan left for Pescara of Serie B, where he played 25 league matches and his backup Pierluigi Brivio played 15 matches.

In mid-2005, he worked for Atalanta, as Alex Calderoni and Ferdinando Coppola's backup.

=== Amateur Football ===
In January 2009, he left for Mapello of Eccellenza Lombardy (Italian 6th level).

In July 2009, he left for UD Ibiza-Eivissa at Regional de Ibiza y Formentera (Spanish fifth level, regional league). After the cancellation of the club, he returned in Italy to play with Prima Categoria amateurs Castelfranco Stella Rossa.

== Honours ==
Salernitana

- Serie B: 1998–99

Livorno

- Serie C1: 2001–02

Fiorentina

- Serie C1: 2002–03

Atalanta

- Serie B: 2005–06
