= Pierluigi Brivio =

Italian former professional footballer

Personal information
- Date of birth: 21 May 1969 (age 57)
- Place of birth: Milan, Italy
- Height: 1.85 m (6 ft 1 in)
- Position: Goalkeeper

Team information
- Current team: Red Star Belgrade (GK coach)

Youth career
- 1987–1989: Atalanta

Senior career*
| Years | Team | Apps | (Gls) |
| 1989–1994 | Palazzolo | 131 | (0) |
| 1994–2000 | Vicenza | 105 | (0) |
| 2000–2002 | Venezia | 23 | (0) |
| 2002–2003 | Genoa | 35 | (0) |
| 2003–2004 | Napoli | 5 | (0) |
| 2004–2005 | Pescara | 17 | (0) |
| 2005–2007 | Mantova | 45 | (0) |
| 2007–2008 | Monza | 32 | (0) |
| 2008–2011 | Pergocrema | 14 | (0) |
| Total | | 407 | (0) |

Managerial career
- 2010: Portosummaga (GK coach)
- 2011–2014: Monza (GK coach)
- 2014–2015: AlbinoLeffe (GK coach)
- 2015–2019: Inter Milan U19 (GK coach)
- 2019–2020: Südtirol (GK coach)
- 2020–2022: Red Star Belgrade (GK coach)
- 2022–2023: Sampdoria (GK coach)
- 2023–2024: Ferencváros (GK coach)
- 2024–2025: Spartak Moscow (GK coach)
- 2025–: Red Star Belgrade (GK coach)
- * Club domestic league appearances and goals

Pierluigi Brivio (born 21 May 1969) is an Italian professional football coach and a former goalkeeper. He is a goalkeeping coach with Serbia club Red Star Belgrade.

== Playing career ==
Brivio started his career at Atalanta youth team. He then played for Palazzolo of Serie C2, and won promotion to Serie C1 in summer 1991.

He transferred to Vicenza of Serie B in summer 1994. He played first 3 seasons as second choice behind Giorgio Sterchele and then Luca Mondini. He took the regular place from Mondini in mid-1997 and played in the final when they won the 1996–97 Coppa Italia. He played 70 Serie A games for Vicenza from 1995 until 1999.

He transferred to Venezia of Serie B in summer 2000. He lost his first team place after Venezia promoted to Serie A in summer 2001.

In summer 2002, he transferred to Genoa of Serie B, as first choice.

In summer 2003, he transferred to Napoli to replace the left of Francesco Mancini, as Emanuele Manitta's backup.

Due to Napoli's bankruptcy in summer 2004, Brivio signed for Pescara of Serie B, where he competed with Andrea Ivan.

In summer 2005, he left for newly promoted Serie B team Mantova, in the first season he was the backup of Mirko Bellodi.

In the second season, he became the regular with Mirko Bellodi as backup.

In summer 2007, he left for Monza of Serie C1, following the signing of Slovenian international Jasmin Handanovič.

In summer 2008, he was signed by Unione Sportiva Pergocrema 1932 in the Italian Serie C1 championship.

== Coaching career ==
Since 2020, he works as a goalkeeping coach with Dejan Stanković, moving to Stanković's club appointments.

== Honours ==
Vicenza

- Coppa Italia: 1996–97
