= Elias Abouchabaka =

German footballer

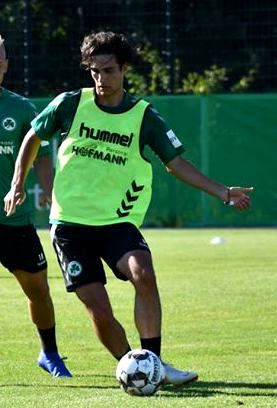
- Abouchabaka in 2018

Personal information
- Full name: Elias Abouchabaka
- Date of birth: 31 March 2000 (age 26)
- Place of birth: Berlin, Germany
- Height: 1.84 m (6 ft 0 in)
- Position: Midfielder

Youth career
- –2010: Berolina Mitte
- 2010–2015: Hertha BSC
- 2015–2018: RB Leipzig

Senior career*
Years	Team	Apps	(Gls)
2018–2020	RB Leipzig	0	(0)
2018–2020	→ Greuther Fürth (loan)	2	(0)
2018–2020	→ Greuther Fürth II (loan)	32	(6)
2020–2022	Vitória Guimarães B	8	(0)
2020–2022	Vitória Guimarães	1	(0)

International career
2015–2016	Germany U16	10	(4)
2017	Germany U17	16	(8)
2018	Germany U18	4	(0)
2018	Germany U19	2	(0)
- * Club domestic league appearances and goals as of 10 April 2021

Elias Abouchabaka (born 31 March 2000) is a retired German professional footballer who played as a midfielder.

== Club career ==
Abouchabaka made his professional debut for Greuther Fürth on 20 August 2018, appearing in the first round of the 2018–19 DFB-Pokal against Bundesliga side Borussia Dortmund. He was substituted on in the 97th minute for Julian Green, with the match finishing as a 1–2 loss after extra time.

On 31 January 2020, Abouchabaka moved to Portuguese Primeira Liga club Vitória Guimarães on a deal until June 2024. He got his official debut on 11 June 2020 against Belenenses SAD.

== International career ==
In 2017, Abouchabaka was included in Germany's squad for the 2017 UEFA European Under-17 Championship in Croatia. He scored three goals in the tournament in which Germany managed to reach the semi-finals, before losing on penalties to Spain. Later that year, he was included in Germany's squad for the 2017 FIFA U-17 World Cup in India, where Germany were eliminated in the quarter-finals.

== Personal life ==
Abouchabaka was born in Berlin, Germany and is of Moroccan descent.

== Honours ==
Germany

- UEFA European Under-17 Championship Team of the Tournament: 2017
