= Moha Ramos =

Spanish footballer (born 2000)

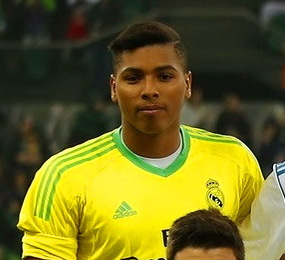
- Ramos with Real Madrid B in 2018

Personal information
- Full name: Mohamed Airam Ramos Wade
- Date of birth: 13 April 2000 (age 26)
- Place of birth: Santa Cruz de Tenerife, Spain
- Height: 1.89 m (6 ft 2 in)
- Position: Goalkeeper

Team information
- Current team: Dunkerque
- Number: 73

Youth career
- Longuera
- 2012–2014: Tenerife
- 2014–2018: Real Madrid

Senior career*
Years	Team	Apps	(Gls)
2018–2019	Real Madrid B	1	(0)
2019–2021	Real Madrid	0	(0)
2019–2020	→ Birmingham City (loan)	0	(0)
2020–2021	→ Real Unión (loan)	1	(0)
2021–2022	Racing B	7	(0)
2022	Avilés	3	(0)
2022–2023	Las Palmas B	15	(0)
2023–2025	Tenerife B	12	(0)
2023–2025	Tenerife	0	(0)
2025–2026	Marino	4	(0)
2026–	Dunkerque	0	(0)

International career^{‡}
- Spain U17
- * Club domestic league appearances and goals as of 7 December 2025 ‡ National team caps and goals as of 19 May 2017

Mohamed Airam Ramos Wade (born 13 April 2000) is a Spanish professional footballer who plays as a goalkeeper for French Ligue 2 club Dunkerque.

== Early and personal life ==
Ramos was born in Santa Cruz de Tenerife. He is of Senegalese origin.

== Club career ==
Ramos spent his early career with Longuera and Tenerife before joining Real Madrid in 2014. In July 2019 he signed on loan for English club Birmingham City. He left Birmingham City at the end of the 2019–20 season, after the expiry of his loan.

In September 2020 he moved on loan to Real Unión.

In July 2021 he left Real Madrid. In August 2021 he signed for Racing de Santander, playing for their reserve team Rayo Cantabria. He moved to Real Avilés in January 2022. On 16 July he moved to Las Palmas B.

In July 2023, Ramos returned to the club he played for as a junior, Tenerife, where he became a part of the club's B team.

On 26 June 2026, Ramos signed a three-year contract with Dunkerque in French Ligue 2.

== International career ==
Ramos represented Spain at the 2017 UEFA European Under-17 Championship, which Spain won, making one appearance in a group stage game against Croatia.

Ramos was in the preliminary Spain squad for the 2017 FIFA U-17 World Cup but was dropped due to disciplinary reasons.
