= Moha Moukhliss =

Spanish footballer

Personal information
- Full name: Mohamed Aiman Moukhliss Agmir
- Date of birth: 6 February 2000 (age 26)
- Place of birth: Madrid, Spain
- Height: 1.69 m (5 ft 7 in)
- Position: Midfielder

Team information
- Current team: Karpaty Lviv
- Number: 10

Youth career
- 2006–2010: San Blas
- 2010–2019: Real Madrid

Senior career*
Years	Team	Apps	(Gls)
2019–2020	Real Madrid B	0	(0)
2019–2020	→ Celta B (loan)	23	(1)
2020–2022	Valladolid B	58	(1)
2022–2024	Andorra	9	(0)
2023–2024	→ Barcelona B (loan)	53	(3)
2024–2025	Murcia	24	(0)
2025–2026	Vizela	31	(2)
2026–	Karpaty Lviv	6	(0)

International career
2016–2017	Spain U17	20	(2)
2018–2019	Spain U19	14	(1)
Medal record
Men's football
Representing Spain
FIFA U-17 World Cup
Runner-up	2017 India
UEFA European Under-19 Championship
Winner	2019 Armenia
UEFA European Under-17 Championship
Winner	2017 Croatia
- * Club domestic league appearances and goals as of 11 September 2026

Mohamed Aiman Moukhliss Agmir (Arabic: محمد أيمن مخلص; born 6 February 2000), known as Moha Moukhliss or just Moha, is a Spanish professional footballer who plays as a midfielder for Ukrainian Premier League club Karpaty Lviv.

== Club career ==
Born in Madrid to Moroccan parents, Moha joined Real Madrid's La Fábrica in 2010, aged ten, from EDM San Blas. On 2 September 2019, after finishing his formation, he was loaned to RC Celta de Vigo's reserves in Segunda División B, for one year.

Moha made his senior debut on 18 September 2019, starting in a 4–2 home win over UD Melilla, and scored his first senior goal the following 2 February by netting the equalizer in a 1–1 away draw against Marino de Luanco. He returned to Castilla on 4 August 2020, after Celta did not exercise his buyout clause, but moved to another reserve team, Real Valladolid Promesas on a four-year contract sixteen days later.

On 5 April 2021, Moha was included in the Real Valladolid squad against FC Barcelona, wearing the number 35 jersey. He remained an unused substitute in the 1–0 loss at the Camp Nou.

On 24 August 2022, Moha left Valladolid, and moved to Segunda División newcomers FC Andorra two days later, on a three-year deal. He made his professional debut on 9 October, coming on as a second-half substitute for Rubén Bover in a 0–0 away draw against Málaga CF.

On 31 January 2023, Moha was loaned to FC Barcelona Atlètic for the remainder of the 2022–23 Primera Federación. On 21 July, his loan was extended for a further year.

On 30 August 2024, Moha signed with Murcia in Primera Federación.

On 3 July 2025, Moha moved to Vizela in Liga Portugal 2 on a one-season deal.

On 3 July 2026, Moha joined Karpaty Lviv in Ukraine, signing a contract for three seasons with an optional fourth.

== Career statistics ==
=== Club ===
As of match played 23 June 2024

Appearances and goals by club, season and competition
Club	Season	League			Cup		Other		Total	
Club	Season	Division	Apps	Goals	Apps	Goals	Apps	Goals	Apps	Goals
Celta Vigo B (loan)	2019–20	Segunda División B	23	1	—		—		23	1
Valladolid B	2020–21	Segunda División B	22	0	—		—		22	0
Valladolid B	2021–22	Primera División RFEF	36	1	—		—		36	1
Valladolid B	Total		58	1	0	0	0	0	58	1
Andorra	2022–23	Segunda División	9	0	2	0	—		11	0
Barcelona B (loan)	2022–23	Primera Federación	17	1	—		2 (Note: Appearance in 2023 Primera Federación play-offs)	0	19	1
Barcelona B (loan)	2023–24	Primera Federación	36	2	—		4 (Note: Appearances in 2024 Primera Federación play-offs)	0	40	2
Barcelona B (loan)	Total		53	3	0	0	6	0	59	3
Career total			143	5	2	0	6	0	151	5

== Honours ==
Spain U17

- UEFA European Under-17 Championship: 2017

Spain U19

- UEFA European Under-19 Championship: 2019
