= Nacho Díaz =

Spanish association football player

Personal information
- Full name: Ignacio Díaz Barragán
- Date of birth: 27 June 2000 (age 26)
- Place of birth: Jaén, Spain
- Height: 1.73 m (5 ft 8 in)
- Position: Striker

Team information
- Current team: Unión Adarve

Youth career
- Jaén
- Villarreal
- 2016–2017: Roda
- 2017–2018: Villarreal

College career
Years	Team	Apps	(Gls)
2022–2024	Evansville Purple Aces	35	(14)
2025	George Mason Patriots	14	(2)

Senior career*
Years	Team	Apps	(Gls)
2018–2020	Villarreal C	39	(5)
2019–2020	→ Calahorra (loan)	5	(2)
2020–2021	Almería B	9	(2)
2021	Cádiz B	2	(0)
2021–2022	Ursaria	2	(0)
2024	Little Rock Rangers	11	(4)
2026–	Unión Adarve	4	(0)

International career
2016–2017	Spain U17	12	(3)
2018	Spain U18	3	(1)
2018–2019	Spain U19	4	(0)
- * Club domestic league appearances and goals as of 28 March 2026

Ignacio "Nacho" Díaz Barragán (born 27 June 2000) is a Spanish footballer who plays as a striker for AD Unión Adarve.

== Club career ==
As a youth player, Díaz joined the youth academy of Spanish La Liga side Villarreal, where he was considered a prospect.

On 22 January 2024, it was announced that Díaz would be joining the Little Rock Rangers for the 2024 USL League Two season.

== International career ==
Díaz represented Spain internationally at youth level, helping them win the 2017 UEFA European Under-17 Championship.

== College career ==
In 2022, Díaz joined the Evansville Purple Aces in the United States, where he was regarded as one of the team's most important players.

== Personal life ==
Diaz is the son of a Spanish football manager and the grandson of a Spanish footballer (Ignacio Díaz Olivares).
