= Andrew Mendonça =

Footballer (born 2000)

Personal information
- Full name: Andrew Antonio Mendonça
- Date of birth: 9 July 2000 (age 26)
- Place of birth: Quibala, Angola
- Height: 1.77 m (5 ft 10 in)
- Position: Midfielder

Team information
- Current team: Jong PSV
- Number: 14

Youth career
- SP Lochem
- –2016: FC Twente
- 2016–2021: PSV Eindhoven

Senior career*
Years	Team	Apps	(Gls)
2019–2021	Jong PSV	17	(0)

International career^{‡}
2014–2015	Netherlands U15	8	(1)
2015–2016	Netherlands U16	12	(0)
2016–2017	Netherlands U17	6	(0)
2017	Netherlands U18	2	(0)
- * Club domestic league appearances and goals as of 23 October 2020 ‡ National team caps and goals as of 4 September 2017

Andrew Antonio Mendonça (born 9 July 2000) is a footballer who plays as a midfielder. Born in Angola, represented the Netherlands at several youth levels.

== Club career ==
Born in Angola, Mendonça moved with his family to Lochem. He made his Eerste Divisie debut for Jong PSV on 13 January 2019 in a game against Jong Ajax, as a 59th-minute substitute for Justin Lonwijk.
