= Tijn Daverveld =

Dutch footballer (born 2000)

Personal information
- Date of birth: 29 April 2000 (age 26)
- Place of birth: Boxmeer, Netherlands
- Height: 1.78 m (5 ft 10 in)
- Positions: Central midfielder; right back

Team information
- Current team: UNA
- Number: 8

Youth career
- De Willy's
- –2008: UDI '19
- 2008–2019: PSV

Senior career*
Years	Team	Apps	(Gls)
2019–2021	Jong PSV	68	(2)
2021–2022	AEL Limassol	7	(0)
2022–2025	Wezel Sport	78	(7)
2025–	UNA	0	(0)

International career
2015	Netherlands U15	1	(0)
2015	Netherlands U16	1	(0)
2016–2017	Netherlands U17	12	(0)
2017–2018	Netherlands U18	3	(0)
2018	Netherlands U19	2	(0)
- * Club domestic league appearances and goals as of 09:05, 20 July 2025 (UTC)

Tijn Daverveld (born 29 April 2000) is a Dutch professional footballer who plays as a midfielder for Derde Divisie club UNA.

== Club career ==
He made his Eerste Divisie debut for Jong PSV on 13 January 2019 in a game against Jong Ajax, as a starter. After a spell in Cyprus, Daverveld from the small village Wilbertoord, moved to Belgium to play for fifth-tier Wezel Sport.

He joined UNA in summer 2025.

== International career ==
Daverveld played 12 games for the Netherlands national under-17 football team and also some for the U18 and U19s.
