= Magnus Jacobsen =

Faroese footballer (born 2000)

Personal information
- Full name: Magnus Holm Jacobsen
- Date of birth: 23 May 2000 (age 26)
- Place of birth: Hoyvík, Faroe Islands
- Height: 1.80 m (5 ft 11 in)
- Position: Midfielder

Team information
- Current team: 07 Vestur
- Number: 52

Youth career
- –2018: B36 Tórshavn
- 2018–2019: Paços de Ferreira

Senior career*
Years	Team	Apps	(Gls)
2016–2018	B36 Tórshavn II	8	(6)
2017–2018	B36 Tórshavn	26	(0)
2018–2019	Paços de Ferreira	0	(0)
2019–2019	B36 Tórshavn II	7	(1)
2019–2023	B36 Tórshavn	78	(9)
2023	07 Vestur	18	(4)
2024	HB Tórshavn	4	(0)
2025–	B68 Toftir	14	(1)
2025–	07 Vestur	26	(0)

International career^{‡}
2015–2017	Faroe Islands U17	19	(0)
2017–2018	Faroe Islands U19	10	(0)
2019–2023	Faroe Islands U21	11	(0)
2020–	Faroe Islands	1	(0)
- * Club domestic league appearances and goals as of 1 November 2026 ‡ National team caps and goals as of 08:38, 21 July 2023 (UTC)

Magnus Holm Jacobsen (born 23 May 2000) is a Faroese professional footballer who plays as a midfielder for 07 Vestur and the Faroe Islands national team.

== Career ==
Jacobsen made his international debut for the Faroe Islands on 11 November 2020 in a friendly match against Lithuania.

On 21 July 2023, Jacobsen was announced to have joined Polish I liga side Chrobry Głogów on a two-year contract, with an option to extend it for another year. However, he could not be registered to play due to his previous club 07 Vestur claiming they still had a valid contract with Jacobsen, despite Chrobry stating they had certification of his free agency. In mid-July 2023, since Jacobsen's contract would not be in effect until he was registered, Chrobry cancelled their agreement with the player.

== Career statistics ==
=== International ===
As of 11 November 2020

Faroe Islands
Year	Apps	Goals
2020	1	0
Total	1	0

== Honours ==
B36 Tórshavn

- Faroe Islands Cup: 2018, 2021
