= Alessio Bandieri =

Italian footballer (born 1974)

Personal information
- Date of birth: 3 April 1974 (age 52)
- Place of birth: Pavullo nel Frignano, Italy
- Height: 1.81 m (5 ft 11 in)
- Position: Goalkeeper

Youth career
- Modena

Senior career*
Years	Team	Apps	(Gls)
1991–1993	Modena	2	(0)
1993–1994	Crevalcore	34	(0)
1994–1997	Modena	101	(0)
1997–1999	Venezia	6	(0)
1999–2000	Napoli	22	(0)
2000–2001	Savoia	14	(0)
2001	Venezia	0	(0)
2001–2003	Padova	35	(0)
2004	Maranello	7	(0)
2004–2006	Virtus Pavullese	65	(0)
2006–2008	Fiorano	56	(0)
2008–2011	Polinago	83	(0)
2011–2015	Lama 80		
Total		425	(0)
- * Club domestic league appearances and goals as of 8 November 2024

Alessio Bandieri (born 3 April 1974), is an Italian former professional footballer who played as a goalkeeper.

== Career ==
Revealed by the Modena youth sectors, Bandieri played most of his career at the club, but also stood out as Serie C2 champion with Crevalcore, and playing in Serie A for Venezia and Napoli. He also played for Eccellenza and Promozione teams such as Maranello and Polinago, and ended his career in 2015, at the age of 41, playing for Lama 80.

== Honours ==
Crevalcore

- Serie C2: 1993–94 (group A)
