= Mateu Morey =

Spanish footballer (born 2000)

Personal information
- Full name: Mateu Jaume Morey Bauzà
- Date of birth: 2 March 2000 (age 26)
- Place of birth: Petra, Spain
- Height: 1.73 m (5 ft 8 in)
- Position: Right-back

Team information
- Current team: Girona

Youth career
- Petra
- Manacor
- 2014–2015: Mallorca
- 2015–2019: Barcelona

Senior career*
Years	Team	Apps	(Gls)
2019–2024	Borussia Dortmund II	18	(0)
2019–2024	Borussia Dortmund	21	(0)
2024–2026	Mallorca	35	(1)
2026–	Girona	3	(0)

International career
2016	Spain U16	3	(0)
2016–2017	Spain U17	21	(3)
2018	Spain U18	3	(0)
Medal record
Men's football
Representing Spain
FIFA U-17 World Cup
Runner-up	2017 India
UEFA European Under-17 Championship
Winner	2017 Croatia
- * Club domestic league appearances and goals as of 24 October 2026

Mateu Jaume Morey Bauzà (Balearic Catalan: [məˈtew moˈɾəj]; born 2 March 2000) is a Spanish professional footballer who plays as a right-back for Segunda División club Girona.

== Club career ==
=== Early career ===
Born in Petra, Majorca, Balearic Islands, Morey joined FC Barcelona's La Masia in June 2015, after representing RCD Mallorca, CE Manacor and hometown side UE Petra. He helped Barça win the 2017–18 UEFA Youth League, featuring in five matches during the competition.

Morey was promoted to the B-team for the 2018–19 campaign, but suffered a serious knee injury in August 2018 which kept him sidelined until the following March. After rejecting a contract renewal from the Catalans, he was separated from the squad, and subsequently also suffered another knee injury which kept him out for nearly two months.

=== Borussia Dortmund ===
On 1 July 2019, free agent Morey agreed to a five-year contract with Bundesliga side Borussia Dortmund. After initially playing for the reserves in the Regionalliga West, he made his professional debut on 31 May 2020, coming on as a late substitute for Achraf Hakimi in a 6–1 away routing of SC Paderborn 07.

Morey made his UEFA Champions League debut on 4 November 2020, replacing Thomas Meunier in a 3–0 away success over Club Brugge KV.

On 1 May 2021, Morey suffered a serious injury to his knee after landing awkwardly following a tackle in a DFB Pokal match against Holstein Kiel. He missed the remainder of the 2020–21 season as well as the 2021–22 season.

On 9 February 2024, Morey came on as a substitute in the 88th minute in a 3–0 win over SC Freiburg, marking his first appearance in 1,015 days for the club. Later that year, on 4 May, he made his first Bundesliga start following his long-term injury in a 5–1 victory over FC Augsburg. On 18 May, Borussia Dortmund announced that Morey would leave the club upon the conclusion of the 2023–24 season.

=== Mallorca ===
On 5 July 2024, Morey signed with Mallorca for one season, with two more optional seasons. He scored his first professional goal on 23 August 2025, netting the equalizer in a 1–1 home draw against Celta Vigo, but was mainly a backup to Pablo Maffeo as the club suffered relegation in 2026.

=== Girona ===
On 31 August 2026, Morey signed a two-year deal with Girona, also relegated to Segunda División.

== International career ==
Morey represented Spain at under-17 level in the 2017 UEFA European Under-17 Championship and the 2017 FIFA U-17 World Cup, being a regular starter in both tournaments as his side won the former and finished second in the latter. He also played for the nation's under-16 and under-18 sides in 2016 and 2018, respectively.

== Career statistics ==
As of match played 24 October 2026

Appearances and goals by club, season and competition
Club	Season	League			DFB-Pokal		Europe		Other		Total	
Club	Season	Division	Apps	Goals	Apps	Goals	Apps	Goals	Apps	Goals	Apps	Goals
Borussia Dortmund II	2019–20	Regionalliga West	11	0	—		—		—		11	0
Borussia Dortmund II	2022–23	3. Liga	1	0	—		—		—		1	0
Borussia Dortmund II	2023–24	3. Liga	6	0	—		—		—		6	0
Borussia Dortmund II	Total		18	0	—		—		—		18	0
Borussia Dortmund	2019–20	Bundesliga	5	0	0	0	0	0	0	0	5	0
Borussia Dortmund	2020–21	Bundesliga	13	0	4	0	7 (Note: Appearances in UEFA Champions League)	0	0	0	24	0
Borussia Dortmund	2021–22	Bundesliga	0	0	0	0	0	0	0	0	0	0
Borussia Dortmund	2022–23	Bundesliga	0	0	0	0	0	0	—		0	0
Borussia Dortmund	2023–24	Bundesliga	3	0	0	0	0	0	—		3	0
Borussia Dortmund	Total		21	0	4	0	7	0	0	0	32	0
Mallorca	2024–25	La Liga	16	0	1	0	—		0	0	17	0
Mallorca	2025–26	La Liga	18	1	2	0	—		—		20	1
Mallorca	2026–27	Segunda División	1	0	0	0	—		—		1	0
Mallorca	Total		35	1	3	0	—		—		38	1
Girona	2026–27	Segunda División	3	0	0	0	—		—		3	0
Career total			77	1	7	0	7	0	0	0	91	1

== Honours ==
Barcelona

- UEFA Youth League: 2017–18

Borussia Dortmund

- DFB-Pokal: 2020–21

Spain U17

- UEFA European Under-17 Championship: 2017
