= Mirko Bellodi =

Italian footballer

Personal information
- Date of birth: 20 October 1973 (age 53)
- Place of birth: Suzzara, Italy
- Height: 1.84 m (6 ft 0 in)
- Position: Goalkeeper

Youth career
- Parma

Senior career*
Years	Team	Apps	(Gls)
1992–1993	Fano	4	(0)
1993–1994	Trento	20	(0)
1994–1995	Formia	34	(0)
1995–1996	Collecchio	32	(0)
1996–1998	Mantova	65	(0)
1998–2000	Pistoiese	50	(0)
2000	Reggiana	12	(0)
2000–2012	Mantova	268	(1)
Total		485	(0)
- * Club domestic league appearances and goals

Mirko Bellodi (born 20 October 1973) is an Italian former professional footballer who played as a goalkeeper.

== Career ==
Born in Suzzara, the province of province of Mantua (Italian: Mantova), Lombardy, Bellodi started his career at Parma. From 1992 to 1995 Bellodi had played for 3 different Serie C2 clubs (Italian fourth division). Bellodi moved down one level in 1995–96 Serie D, for Collecchio. The club was located in the province of Parma. In 1996, he returned to the hometown club Mantova. He won the group D of 1996–97 Serie D and promoted back to professional league. Bellodi only missed 1 game in 1997–98 Serie C2. In 1998 Bellodi was signed by Pistoiese. He won the promotion playoffs of 1998–99 Serie C1. In 1999–2000 Serie B Bellodi played the first 16 rounds but in January 2000 returned to Serie C1 for Reggiana. He took the starting place from Beniamino Abate.

=== Return to Mantova ===
==== 2000–06 ====
Bellodi returned to Mantua again in 2000. The club won group A of 2003–04 Serie C2 and the promotion playoffs of 2004–05 Serie C1, thus returned to the second division since relegated in 1973. Bellodi was the first choice of 2005–06 Serie B.

==== 2006–09 ====
In the next season Bellodi swapped the role with Pierluigi Brivio, which Brivio now on the field and Bellodi on the bench. Brivio left the club in 2007 but the first choice role was shared by Jasmin Handanović and Gianluca Pegolo. J.Handanović became the absolute starter in 2008–09 Serie B, with only 2 games played by Bellodi.

==== 2009–10 ====
In 2009–10 Serie B, Bellodi competed with J.Handanović again for the starting role. That season Mantova relegated directly with Bellodi conceded lesser goals per game. Before last round of 2009–10 season, Mantova still one point behind Calcio Padova of 19th place, thus certainly entered relegation "play-out" or direction relegation. Eventually the away match was 2–2 draw with Ancona, with Bellodi conceded a goal on 8th minute and conceded an equalizer goal from Mastronunzio again. Ancona collected enough point to survive in Serie B but later expelled due to financial difficulties and Mantova relegated directly with 3 points gap with Triestina and Padova, as Padova had an early lead in half time, so Mantova still had 1 point short if Mantova won.

==== 2010–12 ====
Mantova also bankrupted in summer 2010 and a new entity was admitted to 2010–11 Serie D. Bellodi also joined the new club and played 18 times. He shared the starting role with Stefano Portesi. The club won the group B of the amateur league and promoted again. Bellodi played the first 18 rounds in 2011–12 Lega Pro Seconda Divisione, with Marco Festa (14 starts) and Portesi (6 starts) played the rest. Bellodi retired in January 2012. He became the goalkeeping coach.

=== Italian football scandal ===
FIGC suspected that the last round of 2009–10 season was fixed. His team-mate Carlo Gervasoni, Tomas Locatelli and Maurizio Nassi also investigated by FIGC as well as the court of Cremona. Moreover, Alessandro Pellicori was arrested.

On 1 June 2012, the procurator requested to ban Bellodi for three years due to involvement in 2011–12 Italian football scandal. Bellodi admitted the charge in exchange for the ban reduced to two years.

== Personal life ==
His son Gabriele Bellodi is a defender, a product of Milan school, he represented Italy internationally on junior levels.

== Honours ==
Mantova

- Serie C2: 2004
- Serie D: 1997, 2011
