= Gabriele Bellodi =

Italian football player

Personal information
- Date of birth: 2 September 2000 (age 26)
- Place of birth: Mantua, Italy
- Height: 1.87 m (6 ft 2 in)
- Position: Defender

Team information
- Current team: Picerno
- Number: 4

Youth career
- –2018: AC Milan

Senior career*
Years	Team	Apps	(Gls)
2018–2023	AC Milan	0	(0)
2018–2019	→ Olbia (loan)	30	(0)
2019–2020	→ Crotone (loan)	2	(0)
2020–2022	→ Alessandria (loan)	14	(0)
2022–2023	→ Olbia (loan)	33	(2)
2023–2024	Olbia	36	(1)
2024–2025	Rimini	42	(1)
2025–	Picerno	21	(1)

International career^{‡}
2016	Italy U16	5	(0)
2016–2017	Italy U17	3	(0)
2017–2018	Italy U18	11	(0)
2018–2019	Italy U19	6	(0)
2019	Italy U20	3	(0)
- * Club domestic league appearances and goals as of 1 May 2026 ‡ National team caps and goals as of 4 September 2020

Gabriele Bellodi (born 2 September 2000) is an Italian professional footballer who plays as a defender for Serie C Group C club Picerno.

== Club career ==
Bellodi is a product of AC Milan youth academy, after graduating he was sent on loan and made his Serie C debut for Olbia on 30 September 2018 in a game against Pro Piacenza. On 10 July 2019, he joined Serie B club Crotone on loan until 30 June 2020. On 3 October 2020, Bellodi joined Serie C club Alessandria on a two-year loan.

On 16 July 2022, Bellodi returned to Serie C club Olbia, on a loan until 30 June 2023.

On 14 July 2023, he returned to Olbia on permanent basis.

On 3 July 2024, Bellodi signed a two-year contract with Rimini.

== International career ==
Bellodi made one substitute appearance for Italy national under-17 football team at the 2017 UEFA European Under-17 Championship.

== Personal life ==
His father Mirko Bellodi played as a goalkeeper, most notably for Mantova.

== Career statistics ==
As of match played 19 March 2023

Appearances and goals by club, season and competition
Club	Season	League			National Cup		Continental		Total	
Club	Season	Division	Apps	Goals	Apps	Goals	Apps	Goals	Apps	Goals
Olbia (loan)	2018–19	Serie C	30	0	0	0	–		30	0
Crotone (loan)	2019–20	Serie B	2	0	1	0	–		3	0
Alessandria (loan)	2020–21	Serie C	14	0	0	0	–		14	0
Olbia (loan)	2022–23	Serie C	28	2	2	0	–		30	2
Career total			74	2	3	0	0	0	77	2
