= Ferdinando Coppola =

Italian footballer (born 1978)

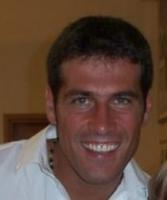
- Coppola in 2009

Personal information
- Full name: Ferdinando Coppola
- Date of birth: 10 June 1978 (age 48)
- Place of birth: Naples, Italy
- Height: 1.88 m (6 ft 2 in)
- Position: Goalkeeper

Youth career
- 1990–1996: Napoli

Senior career*
Years	Team	Apps	(Gls)
1996–2001	Napoli	22	(0)
2000–2003	Roma	0	(0)
2003–2006	Ascoli	69	(0)
2004–2005	→ Reggina (loan)	2	(0)
2006–2008	Milan	0	(0)
2006–2007	→ Piacenza (loan)	42	(0)
2007–2008	→ Atalanta (loan)	38	(0)
2008–2010	Atalanta	30	(0)
2010–2013	Milan	0	(0)
2010–2011	→ Siena (loan)	40	(0)
2011–2012	→ Torino (loan)	22	(0)
2013	Torino	1	(0)
2013–2014	Milan	0	(0)
2014–2015	Bologna	30	(0)
2015–2018	Hellas Verona	1	(0)
Total		297	(0)
- * Club domestic league appearances and goals as of 24 January 2016

Ferdinando Coppola (born 10 June 1978) is a former Italian professional footballer who played as a goalkeeper.

== Career ==
=== Early career ===
Coppola's career began at native club Napoli, he was used as a backup goalkeeper for Giuseppe Taglialatela, Luca Mondini and Alessio Bandieri. In June 2000, he joined Roma as backup to Francesco Antonioli.

=== Ascoli ===
He transferred to Serie B team Ascoli in the summer of 2003, making one appearance before being sent to Serie A team Reggina on loan, playing further two games.

He returned to Ascoli in 2004, and made 28 appearances, plus two more in play-offs, helping Ascoli achieve promotion back to Serie A. During the 2005–06 season, Coppola played all of the 38 Serie A fixtures, and saw Ascoli finish twelfth place in the table.

=== Milan and Piacenza ===
Coppola was signed by A.C. Milan in June 2006, for €200,000, as a replacement for their third choice goalkeeper Valerio Fiori, who was set to retire from professional football. Coppola was to compete with Željko Kalac for this position.

He played a few friendly matches with A.C. Milan, but was sent back to Serie B, to play for Piacenza, because Fiori delayed his retirement.

=== Atalanta ===
In the summer of 2007, he was loaned to Atalanta in Serie A.

In June 2008, Atalanta bought half of the rights from Milan for €750,000.

=== Siena ===
After Atalanta were relegated, Milan bought him back for €200,000 and loaned him to Siena. Two days later Siena sold Gianluca Curci to Sampdoria.

=== Torino ===
On 30 June 2011, Torino announced the signing of Coppola on a temporary basis from Milan. Before the start of the 2012–13, Coppola was sentenced to a six-month ban, later reduced to four months on appeal, for his involvement in the 2011–12 Italian football scandal. After serving the ban, during the January transfer window he re-joined Torino, this time on a permanent deal.

=== Back in Milan ===
On 19 August 2013, he was re-signed by Milan.

=== Bologna ===
On 8 July 2014, Coppola moved to Bologna.

== Career statistics ==
As of match played 1 December 2016

Appearances and goals by club, season and competition
Club	Season	League			Cup		Europe		Other		Total	
Club	Season	Division	Apps	Goals	Apps	Goals	Apps	Goals	Apps	Goals	Apps	Goals
Napoli	1996–97	Serie A	0	0	0	0	—		—		0	0
Napoli	1997–98	Serie A	1	0	0	0	—		—		1	0
Napoli	1998–99	Serie B	2	0	0	0	—		—		2	0
Napoli	1999–00	Serie B	16	0	1	0	—		—		17	0
Napoli	2000–01	Serie A	3	0	2	0	—		—		5	0
Napoli	Total		22	0	3	0	—		—		25	0
Bologna (loan)	2000–01	Serie A	0	0	0	0	—		—		0	0
Bologna (loan)	2001–02	Serie A	0	0	4	0	—		—		4	0
Bologna (loan)	2002–03	Serie A	0	0	2	0	0	0	—		2	0
Bologna (loan)	Total		0	0	6	0	0	0	0	0	6	0
Ascoli	2003–04	Serie B	1	0	1	0	—		—		2	0
Ascoli	2004–05	Serie B	30	0	0	0	—		—		30	0
Ascoli	2005–06	Serie A	38	0	2	0	—		—		40	0
Ascoli	Total		69	0	3	0	—		—		72	0
Reggina (loan)	2003–04	Serie A	2	0	0	0	—		—		2	0
Piacenza (loan)	2006–07	Serie B	42	0	1	0	—		—		43	0
Atalanta	2007–08	Serie A	38	0	0	0	—		—		38	0
Atalanta	2008–09	Serie A	22	0	1	0	—		—		23	0
Atalanta	2009–10	Serie A	8	0	1	0	—		—		9	0
Atalanta	Total		68	0	2	0	—		—		70	0
Milan	2012–13	Serie A	—		0	0	—		—		0	0
Siena (loan)	2010–11	Serie B	40	0	2	0	—		—		42	0
Torino (loan)	2011–12	Serie B	22	0	2	0	—		—		24	0
Torino	2012–13	Serie A	1	0	0	0	—		—		1	0
Milan	2013–14	Serie A	0	0	0	0	0	0	—		0	0
Bologna	2014–15	Serie B	30	0	1	0	—		0	0	31	0
Hellas Verona	2015–16	Serie A	1	0	1	0	—		—		2	0
Hellas Verona	2016–17	Serie B	0	0	1	0	—		—		1	0
Hellas Verona	2017–18	Serie A	0	0	0	0	—		—		9	0
Hellas Verona	Total		1	0	2	0	—		—		3	0
Career total			297	0	22	0	0	0	0	0	319	0
