= Petro Kharzhevskyi =

Ukrainian footballer

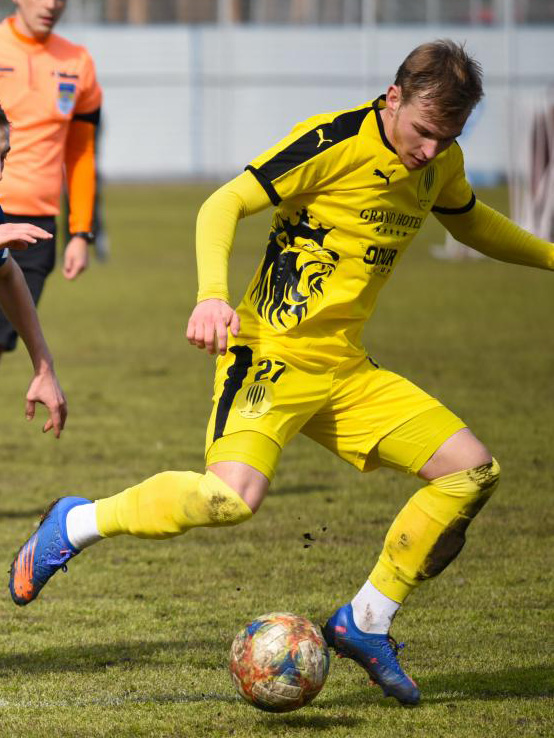
- Petro Kharzhevskyi playing for Rukh Lviv U-21 in 2021

Personal information
- Full name: Petro Petrovych Kharzhevskyi
- Date of birth: 3 January 2000 (age 26)
- Place of birth: Ladyzhyn, Ukraine
- Height: 1.80 m (5 ft 11 in)
- Position: Right-back

Team information
- Current team: Kolos Kovalivka II
- Number: 20

Youth career
- 2011: DYuSSh-2 Ladyzhyn
- 2013–2017: Karpaty Lviv

Senior career*
| Years | Team | Apps | (Gls) |
| 2017–2020 | Karpaty Lviv | 1 | (0) |
| 2020–2021 | Rukh Lviv | 0 | (0) |
| 2022–2024 | Mariupol | 59 | (1) |
| 2025– | Kolos Kovalivka II | 5 | (0) |

International career^{‡}
| 2017 | Ukraine U17 | 2 | (0) |
| 2017 | Ukraine U18 | 3 | (1) |
| 2018 | Ukraine U19 | 4 | (0) |
- * Club domestic league appearances and goals as of 10 June 2025 ‡ National team caps and goals as of 30 August 2021

Petro Petrovych Kharzhevskyi (Ukrainian: Петро Петрович Харжевський; born 3 January 2000) is a Ukrainian professional footballer who plays as a right-back for Kolos Kovalivka II.

== Career ==
Kharzhevskyi is a product of the FC Karpaty Lviv School Sportive System.

He made his debut for FC Karpaty as the substituted player in the winning host match against FC Vorskla Poltava on 4 April 2019 in the Ukrainian Premier League.
