= Alexander Torvund =

Footballer (born 2000)

Personal information
- Date of birth: 1 August 2000 (age 26)
- Place of birth: Bærum, Norway
- Height: 1.77 m (5 ft 10 in)
- Position: Winger

Team information
- Current team: Budafok
- Number: 22

Youth career
- 2009–2011: Baráti Bőrlabda
- 2011–2012: Rákospalotai
- 2012–2016: MTK Budapest
- 2016–2017: Vasas
- 2017–2018: Videoton
- 2019–2020: Stabæk

Senior career*
Years	Team	Apps	(Gls)
2018	Videoton	1	(0)
2018–2019	Ullern	6	(1)
2019–2020	Stabæk	0	(0)
2020–2023	Mezőkövesd	0	(0)
2020–2021	→ Szentlőrinc (loan)	23	(3)
2021–2023	→ Csákvár (loan)	69	(7)
2023–2024	Tiszakécske	30	(5)
2024–2025	FK Csíkszereda	25	(2)
2025–2026	CSM Olimpia Satu Mare	11	(0)
2026–	Budafok	2	(0)

International career
2017	Hungary U17	6	(1)
2018–2019	Hungary U18	5	(1)
2017–2019	Hungary U19	17	(3)
- * Club domestic league appearances and goals as of 31 May 2026

Alexander Torvund (born 1 August 2000) is a professional footballer who plays as a winger for Budafok. Born in Norway, he has represented Hungary internationally at youth levels.

== Honours ==
Videoton

- Nemzeti Bajnokság I: 2017–18
