= Márk Bencze =

Hungarian footballer

Personal information
- Date of birth: 30 January 2000 (age 26)
- Place of birth: Budapest, Hungary
- Height: 1.88 m (6 ft 2 in)
- Position: Left winger

Team information
- Current team: Soroksár
- Number: 24

Youth career
- 2009-2016: Vasas
- 2016-2019: Vitesse

Senior career*
Years	Team	Apps	(Gls)
2019-2020	Siófok	22	(3)
2020-2021	Mezőkövesd	1	(0)
2021-2022	Csákvár	11	(0)
2022	Szeged-Csanád	10	(1)
2022-2023	Győr	9	(0)
2023-2024	Tiszakécske	18	(2)
2024-2025	III. Kerület	21	(17)
2026-	Soroksár	8	(1)

International career
2015-2016	Hungary U-16	8	(2)
2015-2017	Hungary U-17	18	(3)
2018	Hungary U-18	1	(0)
2017-2019	Hungary U-19	13	(0)
- * Club domestic league appearances and goals as of 31 May 2026

Márk Bencze (born 30 January 2000) is a Hungarian professional footballer who plays for Soroksár.

== Club career ==
On 10 February 2022, Bencze signed with Szeged-Csanád.

On 22 June 2022, he moved to Győr on a two-year deal.

== Career statistics ==
As of 10 May 2021.

Appearances and goals by club, season and competition
Club	Season	League			Cup		Continental		Other		Total	
Club	Season	Division	Apps	Goals	Apps	Goals	Apps	Goals	Apps	Goals	Apps	Goals
Siófok	2019–20	Nemzeti Bajnokság II	22	3	2	0	—		0	0	24	3
Siófok	Total		22	3	2	0	0	0	0	0	24	3
Mezőkövesd	2020–21	Nemzeti Bajnokság I	1	0	1	0	—		0	0	2	0
Mezőkövesd	Total		1	0	1	0	0	0	0	0	2	0
Career total			23	3	3	0	0	0	0	0	26	3
