= Noah Awuku =

German footballer (born 2000)

Personal information
- Full name: Noah Awuku
- Date of birth: 9 January 2000 (age 26)
- Place of birth: Kiel, Germany
- Height: 1.82 m (6 ft 0 in)
- Position: Forward

Team information
- Current team: Eintracht Norderstedt
- Number: 28

Youth career
- –2013: Kilia Kiel
- 2013–2018: Holstein Kiel

Senior career*
Years	Team	Apps	(Gls)
2017–2023	Holstein Kiel	3	(0)
2018–2023	Holstein Kiel II	67	(14)
2019–2020	→ Chemnitzer FC (loan)	7	(1)
2023–	Eintracht Norderstedt	16	(3)

International career
2015	Germany U15	2	(0)
2015–2016	Germany U16	6	(2)
2016–2017	Germany U17	8	(2)
2018	Germany U18	1	(0)
- * Club domestic league appearances and goals as of 20 February 2024

Noah Awuku (born 9 January 2000) is a German professional footballer who plays as a forward for Eintracht Norderstedt.

== Club career ==
Awuku made his professional debut for Holstein Kiel in the 2. Bundesliga on 20 October 2018, coming on as a substitute in the 89th minute for Masaya Okugawa in the 1–1 home draw against 1. FC Köln.

On 2 September 2019, Chemnitzer FC announced the signing of Awuku on a season-long deal.

On 25 June 2023, Awuku moved to Eintracht Norderstedt in Regionalliga Nord.
