= Recep Gül =

Turkish footballer

Personal information
- Date of birth: 5 November 2000 (age 26)
- Place of birth: Istanbul, Turkey
- Height: 1.67 m (5 ft 6 in)
- Position: Forward

Team information
- Current team: Orduspor 1967
- Number: 11

Youth career
- 2011–2019: Galatasaray

Senior career*
Years	Team	Apps	(Gls)
2017–2020	Galatasaray	0	(0)
2019–2020	→ Westerlo (loan)	1	(0)
2020–2021	Şanlıurfaspor	7	(0)
2021–2023	1928 Bucaspor	46	(6)
2023–	Orduspor 1967	4	(0)

International career
2015	Turkey U15	7	(3)
2015–2016	Turkey U16	13	(3)
2016–2017	Turkey U17	15	(3)
2017–2018	Turkey U18	13	(2)
2018–2019	Turkey U19	10	(2)
- * Club domestic league appearances and goals as of 1 October 2023

Recep Gül (born 5 November 2000) is a Turkish footballer who plays as a forward for Orduspor 1967 in the TFF Third League.

== Career statistics ==
=== Club ===
As of 13 October 2019.

Club	Season	League			Cup		Continental		Other		Total	
Club	Season	Division	Apps	Goals	Apps	Goals	Apps	Goals	Apps	Goals	Apps	Goals
Galatasaray	2017–18	Süper Lig	0	0	3 (Note: Appearances in the Turkish Cup)	0	0	0	0	0	3	0
Galatasaray	2018–19	Süper Lig	0	0	1	0	0	0	0	0	1	0
Galatasaray	2019–20	Süper Lig	0	0	0	0	0	0	0	0	0	0
Galatasaray	Total		0	0	4	0	0	0	0	0	4	0
Westerlo (loan)	2019–20	Proximus League	1	0	0	0	–		0	0	1	0
Career total			1	0	4	0	0	0	0	0	5	0
