= Jan Boller =

German footballer (born 2000)

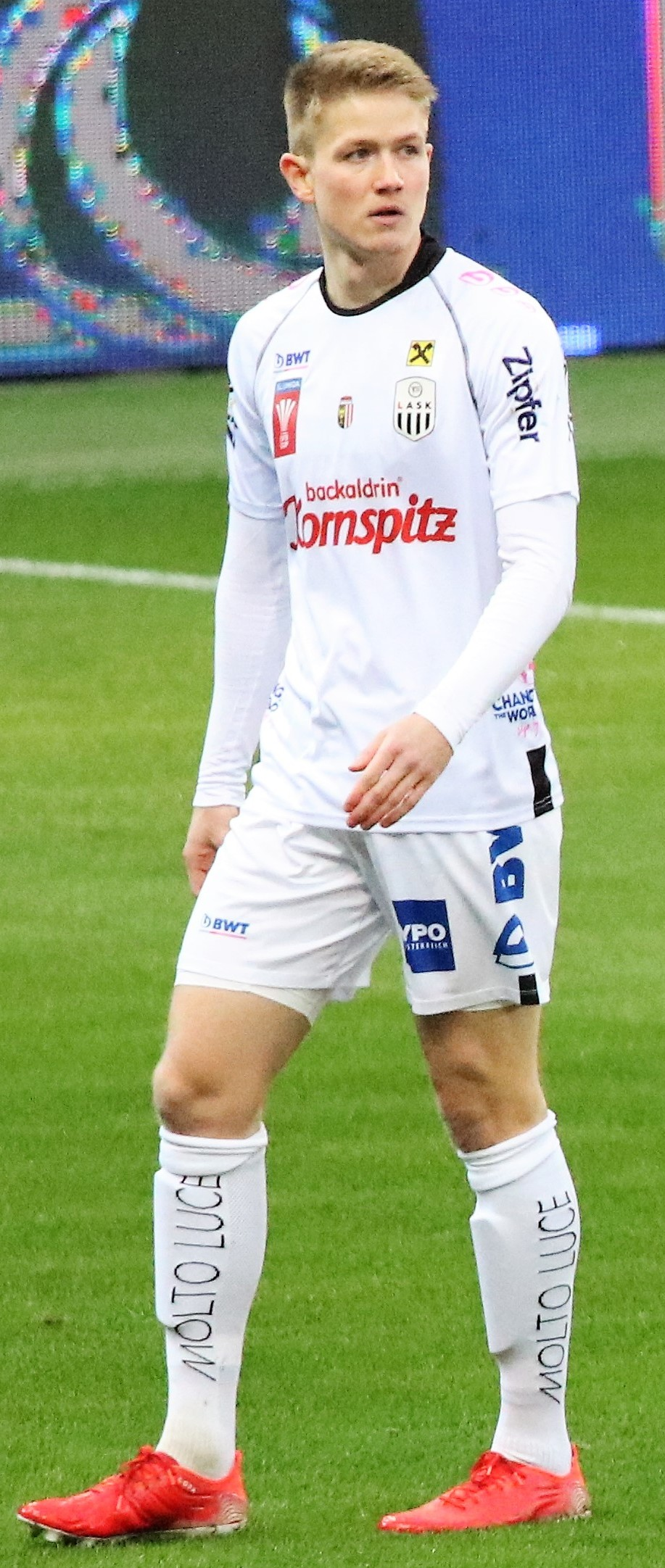
- Boller with LASK in 2022

Personal information
- Full name: Jan Boller
- Date of birth: 14 March 2000 (age 26)
- Place of birth: Siegen, Germany
- Height: 1.85 m (6 ft 1 in)
- Position: Centre-back

Team information
- Current team: SSV Ulm
- Number: 34

Youth career
- –2011: TuS Wilnsdorf/Wilgersdorf
- 2011–2013: TSV Weißtal
- 2013–2019: Bayer Leverkusen

Senior career*
Years	Team	Apps	(Gls)
2019	Bayer Leverkusen	0	(0)
2019–2023	LASK	25	(0)
2019–2023	FC Juniors OÖ	50	(6)
2024–2025	Fortuna Düsseldorf II	39	(1)
2025	Fortuna Düsseldorf	2	(0)
2025–	SSV Ulm	18	(0)

International career^{‡}
2015–2016	Germany U16	8	(0)
2016–2017	Germany U17	16	(0)
2019	Germany U19	1	(0)
- * Club domestic league appearances and goals as of 30 May 2026 ‡ National team caps and goals as of 00:02, 18 September 2020 (UTC)

Jan Boller (born 14 March 2000) is a German professional footballer who plays as a centre-back for club SSV Ulm.

== Career ==
Boller made his professional debut for FC Juniors OÖ in the Austrian Football Second League on 9 August 2019, starting in the home match against Kapfenberger SV, which finished as a 1–0 win.

On 26 May 2025, Boler signed a two-year contract with SSV Ulm.
