= Álvaro García (footballer, born 2000) =

Spanish footballer

Personal information
- Full name: Álvaro García Segovia
- Date of birth: 1 June 2000 (age 26)
- Place of birth: Albacete, Spain
- Height: 1.84 m (6 ft 0 in)
- Position: Centre back

Youth career
- 2011–2018: Albacete

Senior career*
Years	Team	Apps	(Gls)
2018–2019	Albacete B	30	(1)
2019–2021	Atlético Madrid B	42	(3)
2021–2022	Espanyol B	25	(1)
2021–2023	Espanyol	0	(0)
2022–2023	→ Ibiza (loan)	6	(0)
2023	→ Fuenlabrada (loan)	14	(1)
2024–2025	Fuenlabrada	35	(1)
2025–2026	Gimnàstic	12	(0)

International career
2017–2018	Spain U17	13	(0)
2018	Spain U18	4	(0)
2018–2019	Spain U19	10	(0)
- * Club domestic league appearances and goals as of 10 June 2026

Álvaro García Segovia (born 1 June 2000) is a Spanish footballer who plays as a central defender.

== Club career ==
García was born in Albacete, Castilla-La Mancha, and joined Albacete Balompié's youth setup at the age of 11. He made his senior debut with the reserves on 26 August 2018 by starting in a 1–0 Tercera División home win over Mora CF, and scored his first goal on 23 September in a 4–2 home success over CD Marchamalo.

On 2 September 2019, García was transferred to Atlético Madrid and was initially assigned to the B-team in Segunda División B. On 28 August 2021, after the B's relegation, he moved to another reserve team, RCD Espanyol B in Segunda División RFEF.

García made his first team debut with the Pericos on 1 December 2021, coming on as a half-time substitute for Sergi Gómez in a 3–2 away win over SD Solares-Medio Cudeyo, for the season's Copa del Rey. The following 23 June, he agreed to a one-year loan deal with Segunda División side UD Ibiza.

García made his professional debut on 28 August 2022, replacing Kévin Appin in a 1–1 home draw against Deportivo Alavés. The following 31 January, his loan was cut short, and he moved to Primera Federación side CF Fuenlabrada also in a temporary deal.

On 20 July 2023, García terminated his contract with Espanyol, and returned to Fuenla on a permanent deal six days later. Despite missing out most of the season due to a knee injury, he agreed to a three-year extension on 5 August 2024.

García left Fuenlabrada in July 2025, after their relegation, and moved to fellow third division side Gimnàstic de Tarragona on 15 September, on a one-year contract.
