= Artem Kholod =

Ukrainian footballer (born 2000)

Personal information
- Full name: Artem Olehovych Kholod
- Date of birth: 22 January 2000 (age 26)
- Place of birth: Kharkiv, Ukraine
- Height: 1.82 m (6 ft 0 in)
- Position: Midfielder

Team information
- Current team: Grobiņa
- Number: 9

Youth career
- 2009–2016: Metalist Kharkiv
- 2016–2019: Shakhtar Donetsk

Senior career*
Years	Team	Apps	(Gls)
2019–2022	Shakhtar Donetsk	0	(0)
2020–2021	→ Metalist 1925 Kharkiv (loan)	18	(1)
2021–2022	→ Mariupol (loan)	4	(0)
2022–2023	El Paso Locomotive	3	(0)
2023–2024	Chernomorets Burgas	10	(3)
2024	Jelgava	5	(0)
2025–2026	Tukums 2000	44	(2)
2026–	Grobiņa	16	(2)

International career^{‡}
2016–2017	Ukraine U17	21	(7)
2018–2019	Ukraine U19	5	(2)
- * Club domestic league appearances and goals as of 12 November 2026 ‡ National team caps and goals as of 19 May 2021

Artem Olehovych Kholod (Ukrainian: Артем Олегович Холод; born 22 January 2000) is a Ukrainian professional footballer who plays as a midfielder for Latvian Higher League side Grobiņa.

== Career ==
Born in Kharkiv, Kholod began his career in the local FC Metalist youth sportive schools, with his first trainer Yevhen Nazarov, until his transfer to the FC Shakhtar youth sportive system in 2016.

He played in the Ukrainian Premier League Reserves and never made his debut for the senior Shakhtar Donetsk's squad. In August 2020 Kholod signed one-year loan contract with the Ukrainian First League FC Metalist 1925 Kharkiv and made the debut for this team as a start squad player in a drawing home match against FC Nyva Vinnytsia on 5 September 2020.

On 8 August 2022, El Paso Locomotive announced the signing of Kholod from Shakhtar Donetsk for the 2022 USL Championship season.
