= Achraf El Bouchataoui =

Dutch footballer (born 2000)

Personal information
- Date of birth: 12 January 2000 (age 26)
- Place of birth: Rotterdam, Netherlands
- Height: 1.79 m (5 ft 10 in)
- Position: Defensive midfielder

Team information
- Current team: Omonia Aradippou
- Number: 8

Youth career
- 2005–2006: HOV/DJSCR
- 2006–2019: Feyenoord

Senior career*
Years	Team	Apps	(Gls)
2019–2022	Feyenoord	5	(0)
2020	→ Dordrecht (loan)	8	(0)
2021–2022	→ RKC Waalwijk (loan)	13	(0)
2022–2023	KMSK Deinze	11	(0)
2024–2025	Eindhoven	47	(4)
2025–2026	Pro Vercelli	25	(1)
2026–	Omonia Aradippou	9	(1)

International career^{‡}
2015	Netherlands U15	3	(0)
2015–2016	Netherlands U16	11	(1)
2016–2017	Netherlands U17	14	(3)
2017–2018	Netherlands U18	7	(1)
- * Club domestic league appearances and goals as of 7 November 2026 ‡ National team caps and goals as of 10 December 2020

Achraf El Bouchataoui (born 12 January 2000) is a Dutch professional footballer who plays as a defensive midfielder for Cypriot First Division club Omonia Aradippou.

== Club career ==
On 2 May 2019, El Bouchataoui signed his first professional contract with Feyenoord. On 15 January 2020, he joined Dordrecht on loan for the remainder of the 2019–20 season, and made his professional debut five days later in a 2–0 Eerste Divisie defeat away to Jong Ajax.

On 28 June 2022, he signed a two-year deal with Deinze in Belgium.

On 11 January 2024, El Bouchataoui joined Eindhoven on an 18-month contract.

On 8 October 2025, after several months as a free agent, he signed for Serie C club Pro Vercelli. He debuted five days later, coming on in the 58th minute for compatriot Dean Huiberts in a 1–0 defeat away to Trento. The following week he made his first start in a goalless home draw against Giana Erminio at Stadio Silvio Piola.

== International career ==
Born in the Netherlands, El Bouchataoui is of Moroccan descent. He was a youth international for the Netherlands.

== Career statistics ==
As of match played 19 October 2025

Appearances and goals by club, season and competition
Club	Season	League			National cup (Note: Includes KNVB Cup, Belgian Cup)		Continental		Other		Total	
Club	Season	Division	Apps	Goals	Apps	Goals	Apps	Goals	Apps	Goals	Apps	Goals
Feyenoord	2019–20	Eredivisie	0	0	0	0	0	0	—		0	0
Feyenoord	2020–21	Eredivisie	5	0	0	0	0	0	0	0	5	0
Feyenoord	2021–22	Eredivisie	0	0	0	0	0	0	—		0	0
Feyenoord	Total		5	0	0	0	0	0	0	0	5	0
Dordrecht (loan)	2019–20	Eerste Divisie	8	0	0	0	—		—		8	0
RKC Waalwijk (loan)	2021–22	Eredivisie	13	0	0	0	—		—		13	0
Deinze	2022–23	Challenger Pro League	11	0	2	0	—		—		13	0
Eindhoven	2023–24	Eerste Divisie	18	0	0	0	—		—		18	0
Eindhoven	2024–25	Eerste Divisie	29	4	2	0	—		—		31	4
Eindhoven	Total		47	4	2	0	—		—		49	4
Pro Vercelli	2025–26	Serie C	2	0	0	0	—		—		2	0
Career total			86	4	4	0	0	0	0	0	90	4
