= 2019 UEFA European Under-19 Championship qualification =

Tournament details
- Dates: Qualifying round: 10 October – 20 November 2018; Elite round: 20–26 March 2019
- Teams: 54 (from 1 confederation)

Tournament statistics
- Matches played: 120
- Goals scored: 370 (3.08 per match)
- Top scorer(s): (Belgium) Loïs Openda (Romania) Valentin Mihăilă (Slovenia) Aljoša Matko (6 goals each)

The 2019 UEFA European Under-19 Championship qualifying competition was a men's under-19 football competition that determined the seven teams joining the automatically qualified hosts Armenia in the 2019 UEFA European Under-19 Championship final tournament.

Apart from Armenia, all remaining 54 UEFA member national teams entered the qualifying competition. Players born on or after 1 January 2000 were eligible to participate. Starting from this season, up to five substitutions were permitted per team in each match.

== Format ==
The qualifying competition consisted of two rounds:

- Qualifying round: Apart from Portugal and Germany, which received byes to the elite round as the teams with the highest seeding coefficient, the remaining 52 teams were drawn into 13 groups of four teams. Each group was played in single round-robin format at one of the teams selected as hosts after the draw. The thirteen group winners and the thirteen runners-up advanced to the elite round.
- Elite round: The 28 teams were drawn into seven groups of four teams. Each group was played in single round-robin format at one of the teams selected as hosts after the draw. The seven group winners qualified for the final tournament.

The schedule of each group was as follows, with two rest days between each matchday (Regulations Article 19.04):

Group schedule
Matchday	Matches
Matchday 1	1 v 4, 3 v 2
Matchday 2	1 v 3, 2 v 4
Matchday 3	2 v 1, 4 v 3

=== Tiebreakers ===
In the qualifying round and elite round, teams were ranked according to points (3 points for a win, 1 point for a draw, 0 points for a loss), and if tied on points, the following tiebreaking criteria were applied, in the order given, to determine the rankings (Regulations Articles 14.01 and 14.02):

1. Points in head-to-head matches among tied teams;
2. Goal difference in head-to-head matches among tied teams;
3. Goals scored in head-to-head matches among tied teams;
4. If more than two teams were tied, and after applying all head-to-head criteria above, a subset of teams were still tied, all head-to-head criteria above were reapplied exclusively to this subset of teams;
5. Goal difference in all group matches;
6. Goals scored in all group matches;
7. Penalty shoot-out if only two teams had the same number of points, and they met in the last round of the group and were tied after applying all criteria above (not used if more than two teams had the same number of points, or if their rankings were not relevant for qualification for the next stage);
8. Disciplinary points (red card = 3 points, yellow card = 1 point, expulsion for two yellow cards in one match = 3 points);
9. UEFA coefficient for the qualifying round draw;
10. Drawing of lots.

== Qualifying round ==
=== Draw ===
The draw for the qualifying round was held on 6 December 2017, 10:00 CET (UTC+1), at the UEFA headquarters in Nyon, Switzerland.

The teams were seeded according to their coefficient ranking, calculated based on the following (a four-year window was used instead of the previous three-year window):

- 2014 UEFA European Under-19 Championship final tournament and qualifying competition (qualifying round and elite round)
- 2015 UEFA European Under-19 Championship final tournament and qualifying competition (qualifying round and elite round)
- 2016 UEFA European Under-19 Championship final tournament and qualifying competition (qualifying round and elite round)
- 2017 UEFA European Under-19 Championship final tournament and qualifying competition (qualifying round and elite round)

Each group contained one team from Pot A, one team from Pot B, one team from Pot C, and one team from Pot D. For political reasons, Spain and Gibraltar, Serbia and Kosovo, and Bosnia and Herzegovina and Kosovo would not be drawn in the same group.

Final tournament hosts
Team	Coeff	Rank
**Armenia**	2.333	—

Bye to elite round
Team	Coeff	Rank
**Portugal**	24.722	1
Germany	22.778	2

Teams entering qualifying round

Pot A
Team	Coeff	Rank
**England**	21.889	3
Austria	19.000	4
**France**	18.556	5
**Netherlands**	17.667	6
**Spain**	16.500	7
**Ukraine**	14.833	8
**Czech Republic**	14.833	9
**Serbia**	14.667	10
**Russia**	14.611	11
**Italy**	14.222	12
**Greece**	12.500	13
Sweden	12.111	14
Georgia	11.833	15

Pot B
Team	Coeff	Rank
**Croatia**	11.778	16
**Israel**	11.333	17
**Belgium**	11.167	18
**Turkey**	11.000	19
Bulgaria	10.556	20
Slovakia	9.833	21
**Republic of Ireland**	9.000	22
**Hungary**	9.000	23
**Scotland**	8.833	24
**Switzerland**	8.500	25
**Denmark**	8.500	26
**Poland**	8.167	27
Montenegro	8.000	28

Pot C
Team	Coeff	Rank
**Norway**	7.667	29
Bosnia and Herzegovina	6.833	30
**Wales**	6.333	31
**Slovenia**	6.167	32
**Romania**	5.333	33
**Cyprus**	5.167	34
Lithuania	4.667	35
Finland	4.667	36
Northern Ireland	4.000	37
Iceland	4.000	38
**Azerbaijan**	4.000	39
Belarus	3.333	40
Macedonia	3.333	41

Pot D
Team	Coeff	Rank
Latvia	3.000	42
Albania	2.667	43
Luxembourg	2.667	44
Estonia	2.667	45
Malta	2.333	46
Andorra	1.333	47
Faroe Islands	1.333	48
Moldova	1.000	49
Liechtenstein	0.333	50
Gibraltar	0.333	51
Kazakhstan	0.333	52
San Marino	0.000	53
Kosovo	—	54

Notes

- Teams marked in **bold** qualified for the final tournament.

=== Groups ===
The qualifying round was required to be completed by 20 November 2018.

Times up to 27 October 2018 are CEST (UTC+2), thereafter times are CET (UTC+1), as listed by UEFA (local times, if different, are in parentheses).

==== Group 1 ====
Pos	Team	Pld	W	D	L	GF	GA	GD	Pts	Qualification
1	Israel	3	2	1	0	7	3	+4	**7**	Elite round
2	Azerbaijan	3	2	0	1	6	5	+1	**6**	Elite round
3	Georgia (H)	3	1	1	1	9	3	+6	**4**	
4	Liechtenstein	3	0	0	3	1	12	−11	**0**	

Source: UEFA
Rules for classification: Qualification tiebreakers
(H) Hosts
14 November 2018
11:00 (14:00 GET)

Azerbaijan	1–4	Israel
Gasimov 82'	Report	Kanaan 9'; Masarwa 28'; Arad 56', 64'

Mikheil Meskhi Stadium-2, Tbilisi
Referee: Erik Lambrechts (Belgium)
14 November 2018
14:00 (17:00 GET)

Georgia	7–0	Liechtenstein
Davitashvili 18'; Guliashvili 23', 49', 51'; Kvaratskhelia 52'; Babunadze 63'; Ivaniadze 80'	Report

Mikheil Meskhi Stadium, Tbilisi
Referee: Lionel Tschudi (Switzerland)

17 November 2018
11:00 (14:00 GET)

Israel	2–1	Liechtenstein
Abada 10'; Karzev 83'	Report	Unterrainer 55'

Mikheil Meskhi Stadium-2, Tbilisi
Referee: Lionel Tschudi (Switzerland)
17 November 2018
14:00 (17:00 GET)

Georgia	1–2	Azerbaijan
Kharabadze 45+1'	Report	Bayramov 66'; Mardanov 70'

Mikheil Meskhi Stadium, Tbilisi
Referee: Donatas Rumšas (Lithuania)

20 November 2018
14:00 (17:00 GET)

Israel	1–1	Georgia
Karzev 42' (pen.)	Report	Davitashvili 17'

Mikheil Meskhi Stadium, Tbilisi
Referee: Donatas Rumšas (Lithuania)
20 November 2018
14:00 (17:00 GET)

Liechtenstein	0–3	Azerbaijan
	Report	Mahmudov 14'; Guliyev 64', 69'

Mikheil Meskhi Stadium-2, Tbilisi
Referee: Erik Lambrechts (Belgium)

==== Group 2 ====
Pos	Team	Pld	W	D	L	GF	GA	GD	Pts	Qualification
1	Italy	3	3	0	0	7	0	+7	**9**	Elite round
2	Denmark	3	1	1	1	3	1	+2	**4**	Elite round
3	Finland	3	0	2	1	0	3	−3	**2**	
4	Estonia (H)	3	0	1	2	0	6	−6	**1**	

Source: UEFA
Rules for classification: Qualification tiebreakers
(H) Hosts
10 October 2018
14:00 (15:00 EEST)

Italy	3–0	Estonia
Raspadori 11', 87'; Portanova 25'	Report

Rakvere Linnastaadion, Rakvere
Referee: Pavel Orel (Czech Republic)
10 October 2018
14:00 (15:00 EEST)

Finland	0–0	Denmark
	Report

Kadriorg Stadium, Tallinn
Referee: Nikola Popov (Bulgaria)

13 October 2018
14:00 (15:00 EEST)

Italy	3–0	Finland
Kytilä 4' (o.g.); Riccardi 24'; Bettella 80' (pen.)	Report

Kadriorg Stadium, Tallinn
Referee: Alain Durieux (Luxembourg)
13 October 2018
14:00 (15:00 EEST)

Denmark	3–0	Estonia
Madsen 48' (pen.); Jensen 78'; Kaastrup 87'	Report

Rakvere Linnastaadion, Rakvere
Referee: Pavel Orel (Czech Republic)

16 October 2018
14:00 (15:00 EEST)

Denmark	0–1	Italy
	Report	Corbo 9'

Kadriorg Stadium, Tallinn
Referee: Nikola Popov (Bulgaria)
16 October 2018
14:00 (15:00 EEST)

Estonia	0–0	Finland
	Report

Rakvere Linnastaadion, Rakvere
Referee: Alain Durieux (Luxembourg)

==== Group 3 ====
Pos	Team	Pld	W	D	L	GF	GA	GD	Pts	Qualification
1	Czech Republic (H)	3	2	1	0	6	4	+2	**7**	Elite round
2	Croatia	3	1	2	0	5	4	+1	**5**	Elite round
3	Macedonia	3	1	1	1	4	3	+1	**4**	
4	Luxembourg	3	0	0	3	2	6	−4	**0**	

Source: UEFA
Rules for classification: Qualification tiebreakers
(H) Hosts
14 November 2018
14:00

Macedonia	1–1	Croatia
Churlinov 11'	Report	Šutalo 55'

Stadion SK Hanácká Slavia Kroměříž, Kroměříž
Referee: Kirill Levnikov (Russia)
14 November 2018
17:00

Czech Republic	2–1	Luxembourg
Pachlopník 4'; Heidenreich 56'	Report	Schaus 16'

Letná Stadion, Zlín
Referee: Timotheos Christofi (Cyprus)

17 November 2018
14:00

Croatia	2–1	Luxembourg
Marin 42'; Palaversa 80' (pen.)	Report	Olesen 72'

Letná Stadion, Zlín
Referee: Timotheos Christofi (Cyprus)
17 November 2018
17:00

Czech Republic	2–1	Macedonia
Zlatohlávek 24'; Kušej 54'	Report	Gjorgjievski 67'

Stadion SK Hanácká Slavia Kroměříž, Kroměříž
Referee: Nicolas Laforge (Belgium)

20 November 2018
17:00

Croatia	2–2	Czech Republic
Šego 34'; Palaversa 89'	Report	Slaměna 42'; Fukala 53'

Letná Stadion, Zlín
Referee: Kirill Levnikov (Russia)
20 November 2018
17:00

Luxembourg	0–2	Macedonia
	Report	Taleski 19'; Fazlagikj 72'

Stadion SK Hanácká Slavia Kroměříž, Kroměříž
Referee: Nicolas Laforge (Belgium)

==== Group 4 ====
Pos	Team	Pld	W	D	L	GF	GA	GD	Pts	Qualification
1	Scotland	3	2	1	0	9	3	+6	**7**	Elite round
2	Wales (H)	3	2	0	1	5	3	+2	**6**	Elite round
3	Sweden	3	1	1	1	5	5	0	**4**	
4	San Marino	3	0	0	3	1	9	−8	**0**	

Source: UEFA
Rules for classification: Qualification tiebreakers
(H) Hosts
14 November 2018
17:00 (16:00 GMT)

Sweden	2–1	San Marino
Mbunga-Kimpioka 54'; Moretti 60' (o.g.)	Report	Moretti 67'

Nantporth, Bangor
Referee: Alexandr Aliyev (Kazakhstan)
14 November 2018
18:00 (17:00 GMT)

Wales	1–2	Scotland
Williams 68'	Report	Cooper 60' (o.g.); Gilmour 85' (pen.)

Belle Vue, Rhyl
Referee: Juri Frischer (Estonia)

17 November 2018
15:00 (14:00 GMT)

Scotland	5–0	San Marino
Awokoya-Mebude 21'; Aitchison 23', 40'; Gilmour 35'; Ross 90+2'	Report

Belle Vue, Rhyl
Referee: Alexandr Aliyev (Kazakhstan)
17 November 2018
16:00 (15:00 GMT)

Sweden	1–2	Wales
Mbunga-Kimpioka 31'	Report	Adams 13'; Norton 63'

Nantporth, Bangor
Referee: Dumitri Muntean (Moldova)

20 November 2018
16:00 (15:00 GMT)

Scotland	2–2	Sweden
Gilmour 20' (pen.); Watt 83'	Report	Ousou 71'; Vagic 73'

Belle Vue, Rhyl
Referee: Juri Frischer (Estonia)
20 November 2018
16:00 (15:00 GMT)

San Marino	0–2	Wales
	Report	Collins 52'; Bowen 83'

Nantporth, Bangor
Referee: Dumitri Muntean (Moldova)

==== Group 5 ====
Pos	Team	Pld	W	D	L	GF	GA	GD	Pts	Qualification
1	Turkey (H)	3	2	0	1	5	2	+3	**6 (Note: Head-to-head result: Turkey 1–0 England.)**	Elite round
2	England	3	2	0	1	7	2	+5	**6**	Elite round
3	Iceland	3	1	1	1	4	5	−1	**4**	
4	Moldova	3	0	1	2	1	8	−7	**1**	

Source: UEFA
Rules for classification: Qualification tiebreakers
(H) Hosts
Notes:
14 November 2018
10:00 (12:00 TRT)

England	4–0	Moldova
Gallagher 24'; Loader 65'; Saka 85'; Sessegnon 90+7'	Report

Arslan Zeki Demirci Sports Complex 2, Manavgat
Referee: Glenn Nyberg (Sweden)
14 November 2018
15:00 (17:00 TRT)

Iceland	2–1	Turkey
Willumsson 39'; Guðjohnsen 84'	Report	Akgün 90+3'

Arslan Zeki Demirci Sports Complex 1, Manavgat
Referee: Mario Zebec (Croatia)

17 November 2018
10:00 (12:00 TRT)

England	3–1	Iceland
Sessegnon 13'; Walker 55', 77'	Report	Ólafsson 34'

Arslan Zeki Demirci Sports Complex 2, Manavgat
Referee: Fabio Verissimo (Portugal)
17 November 2018
15:00 (17:00 TRT)

Turkey	3–0	Moldova
Uzun 6'; Taşkın 49'; Akyuz 74'	Report

Arslan Zeki Demirci Sports Complex 1, Manavgat
Referee: Glenn Nyberg (Sweden)

20 November 2018
13:00 (15:00 TRT)

Turkey	1–0	England
Takır 72'	Report

Arslan Zeki Demirci Sports Complex 1, Manavgat
Referee: Fabio Verissimo (Portugal)
20 November 2018
13:00 (15:00 TRT)

Moldova	1–1	Iceland
Conohov 85'	Report	Guðjohnsen 13'

Arslan Zeki Demirci Sports Complex 2, Manavgat
Referee: Mario Zebec (Croatia)

==== Group 6 ====
Pos	Team	Pld	W	D	L	GF	GA	GD	Pts	Qualification
1	France	3	2	1	0	10	2	+8	**7**	Elite round
2	Belgium	3	1	2	0	8	3	+5	**5**	Elite round
3	Malta (H)	3	1	1	1	3	3	0	**4**	
4	Lithuania	3	0	0	3	1	14	−13	**0**	

Source: UEFA
Rules for classification: Qualification tiebreakers
(H) Hosts
14 November 2018
11:00

France	1–0	Malta
Abi 35'	Report

Centenary Stadium, Ta' Qali
Referee: Duje Strukan (Croatia)
14 November 2018
14:15

Lithuania	0–5	Belgium
	Report	Openda 29' (pen.); Mockus 38' (o.g.); Lutonda 58'; Reyners 72', 80'

Centenary Stadium, Ta' Qali
Referee: Zaven Hovhannisyan (Armenia)

17 November 2018
11:00

France	7–0	Lithuania
Solet 3'; Isidor 6', 23' (pen.), 89' (pen.); Koyalipou 20'; Caqueret 44'; Diop 87'	Report

Centenary Stadium, Ta' Qali
Referee: Ali Palabıyık (Turkey)
17 November 2018
14:15

Belgium	1–1	Malta
Schoonbaert 45+1'	Report	Schoonbaert 11' (o.g.)

Centenary Stadium, Ta' Qali
Referee: Duje Strukan (Croatia)

20 November 2018
11:00

Belgium	2–2	France
Lloci 10'; Openda 40' (pen.)	Report	Koyalipou 8'; Isidor 76'

Centenary Stadium, Ta' Qali
Referee: Ali Palabıyık (Turkey)
20 November 2018
14:15

Malta	2–1	Lithuania
Satariano 52'; Grima 65'	Report	Anisas 12'

Centenary Stadium, Ta' Qali
Referee: Zaven Hovhannisyan (Armenia)

==== Group 7 ====
Pos	Team	Pld	W	D	L	GF	GA	GD	Pts	Qualification
1	Hungary (H)	3	2	1	0	4	2	+2	**7**	Elite round
2	Slovenia	3	1	1	1	7	5	+2	**4**	Elite round
3	Austria	3	0	2	1	3	4	−1	**2**	
4	Kosovo	3	0	2	1	1	4	−3	**2**	

Source: UEFA
Rules for classification: Qualification tiebreakers
(H) Hosts
10 October 2018
15:30

Austria	0–0	Kosovo
	Report

Hévízi úti Stadion, Budapest
Referee: Peter Kjaesgaard (Denmark)
10 October 2018
20:15

Slovenia	1–2	Hungary
Matko 14'	Report	Szoboszlai 60'; Schön 66'

Hidegkuti Nándor Stadion, Budapest
Referee: Tomasz Musiał (Poland)

13 October 2018
15:30

Austria	2–2	Slovenia
Schmid 48'; Aganovic 90+1'	Report	Svetlin 15'; Štravs 34'

Városi Stadion, Csákvár
Referee: Jérôme Brisard (France)
13 October 2018
19:30

Hungary	0–0	Kosovo
	Report

Globall Football Park, Telki
Referee: Peter Kjaesgaard (Denmark)

16 October 2018
15:30

Hungary	2–1	Austria
Torvund 21'; Timári 90+4'	Report	Anselm 13'

Globall Football Park, Telki
Referee: Jérôme Brisard (France)
16 October 2018
15:30

Kosovo	1–4	Slovenia
Limani 54'	Report	Matko 40' (pen.), 57', 88'; Prelec 42'

Városi Stadion, Csákvár
Referee: Tomasz Musiał (Poland)

==== Group 8 ====
Pos	Team	Pld	W	D	L	GF	GA	GD	Pts	Qualification
1	Ukraine	3	2	0	1	6	3	+3	**6 (Note: Head-to-head results: Norway 1–2 Slovakia, Ukraine 1–2 Norway, Slovakia 1–4 Ukraine. Head-to-head standings: Ukraine: 3 pts, +2 GD (5 GF, 3 GA); Norway: 3 pts, 0 GD (3 GF, 3 GA); Slovakia: 3 pts, −2 GD (3 GF, 5 GA))**	Elite round
2	Norway	3	2	0	1	4	3	+1	**6**	Elite round
3	Slovakia	3	2	0	1	6	5	+1	**6**	
4	Albania (H)	3	0	0	3	0	5	−5	**0**	

Source: UEFA
Rules for classification: Qualification tiebreakers
(H) Hosts
Notes:
10 October 2018
12:00

Norway	1–2	Slovakia
Ugland 80'	Report	Strelec 53', 70'

Abdurrahman Roza Haxhiu Stadium, Lushnjë
Attendance: 70
Referee: Paul Mclaughlin (Ireland)
10 October 2018
14:00

Ukraine	1–0	Albania
Mudryk 85'	Report

Niko Dovana Stadium, Durrës
Attendance: 322
Referee: Mohammed Al-Hakim (Sweden)

13 October 2018
12:00

Slovakia	3–0	Albania
Kmeť 7', 30'; Kadák 32'	Report

Niko Dovana Stadium, Durrës
Attendance: 205
Referee: Mohammed Al-Hakim (Sweden)
13 October 2018
14:00

Ukraine	1–2	Norway
Lyakh 82'	Report	Botheim 23'; Tagseth 30'

Abdurrahman Roza Haxhiu Stadium, Lushnjë
Attendance: 400
Referee: Horatiu Fesnic (Romania)

16 October 2018
14:00

Slovakia	1–4	Ukraine
Gono 1'	Report	Isaenko 11'; Sikan 35'; Mudryk 45+2' (pen.); Tsitaishvili 70'

Abdurrahman Roza Haxhiu Stadium, Lushnjë
Attendance: 200
Referee: Paul Mclaughlin (Ireland)
16 October 2018
14:00

Albania	0–1	Norway
	Report	Botheim 31'

Niko Dovana Stadium, Durrës
Attendance: 250
Referee: Horatiu Fesnic (Romania)

==== Group 9 ====
Pos	Team	Pld	W	D	L	GF	GA	GD	Pts	Qualification
1	Serbia	3	2	1	0	9	4	+5	**7**	Elite round
2	Poland	3	1	1	1	5	4	+1	**4**	Elite round
3	Northern Ireland (H)	3	1	1	1	4	5	−1	**4**	
4	Kazakhstan	3	0	1	2	4	9	−5	**1**	

Source: UEFA
Rules for classification: Qualification tiebreakers
(H) Hosts
14 November 2018
15:00 (14:00 GMT)

Serbia	2–2	Kazakhstan
Vlahović 54'; Vidosavljević 78'	Report	Skvortsov 26'; Zhakypbayev 33'

Stangmore Park, Dungannon
Referee: Michal Ocenáš (Slovakia)
14 November 2018
20:00 (19:00 GMT)

Northern Ireland	0–0	Poland
	Report

Shamrock Park, Portadown
Referee: Irfan Peljto (Bosnia and Herzegovina)

17 November 2018
15:00 (14:00 GMT)

Poland	4–0	Kazakhstan
Nawrocki 15'; Żurawski 45'; Bogusz 71'; Kiwior 90+1' (pen.)	Report

Stangmore Park, Dungannon
Referee: Michal Ocenáš (Slovakia)
17 November 2018
20:00 (19:00 GMT)

Serbia	3–1	Northern Ireland
Vidosavljević 52' (pen.); Kamenović 64'; Terzić 69'	Report	Palmer 10'

The Oval, Belfast
Referee: Farrugia Cann Trustin (Malta)

20 November 2018
14:00 (13:00 GMT)

Poland	1–4	Serbia
Zvekanov 25' (o.g.)	Report	Grabowski 9' (o.g.); Vlahović 36', 52'; Terzić 49'

The Showgrounds, Coleraine
Referee: Irfan Peljto (Bosnia and Herzegovina)
20 November 2018
14:00 (13:00 GMT)

Kazakhstan	2–3	Northern Ireland
Skvortsov 3'; Kenesov 59'	Report	Robinson 46'; McConnell 78'; McCalmont 87'

Shamrock Park, Portadown
Referee: Farrugia Cann Trustin (Malta)

==== Group 10 ====
Pos	Team	Pld	W	D	L	GF	GA	GD	Pts	Qualification
1	Republic of Ireland (H)	3	3	0	0	8	2	+6	**9**	Elite round
2	Netherlands	3	2	0	1	12	2	+10	**6**	Elite round
3	Bosnia and Herzegovina	3	1	0	2	3	10	−7	**3**	
4	Faroe Islands	3	0	0	3	1	10	−9	**0**	

Source: UEFA
Rules for classification: Qualification tiebreakers
(H) Hosts
10 October 2018
16:00 (15:00 IST)

Bosnia and Herzegovina	1–3	Republic of Ireland
Božić 78'	Report	Ferry 56'; Parrott 66' (pen.); Idah 74'

Strokestown Road, Longford
Referee: Filip Glova (Slovakia)
10 October 2018
20:00 (19:00 IST)

Netherlands	5–0	Faroe Islands
Kökçü 43'; Burger 45'; Mallahi 53', 62'; Redan 90+4'	Report

Eamonn Deacy Park, Galway
Referee: Giorgi Kruashvili (Georgia)

13 October 2018
16:00 (15:00 IST)

Republic of Ireland	3–0	Faroe Islands
Parrott 67' (pen.), 77', 90+4' (pen.)	Report

Strokestown Road, Longford
Referee: Giorgi Kruashvili (Georgia)
13 October 2018
20:00 (19:00 IST)

Netherlands	6–0	Bosnia and Herzegovina
Redan 5', 9' (pen.), 38', 76' (pen.); Ihattaren 30'; Timber 60'	Report

Eamonn Deacy Park, Galway
Referee: Julian Weinberger (Austria)

16 October 2018
14:00 (13:00 IST)

Republic of Ireland	2–1	Netherlands
Idah 29'; Ferry 70'	Report	Romenij 15'

Strokestown Road, Longford
Referee: Filip Glova (Slovakia)
16 October 2018
14:00 (13:00 IST)

Faroe Islands	1–2	Bosnia and Herzegovina
Sørensen 27'	Report	Hasić 37', 43' (pen.)

Eamonn Deacy Park, Galway
Referee: Julian Weinberger (Austria)

==== Group 11 ====
Pos	Team	Pld	W	D	L	GF	GA	GD	Pts	Qualification
1	Russia	3	2	1	0	5	1	+4	**7**	Elite round
2	Cyprus (H)	3	1	1	1	1	2	−1	**4 (Note: Head-to-head result: Latvia 0–1 Cyprus.)**	Elite round
3	Latvia	3	1	1	1	3	3	0	**4**	
4	Montenegro	3	0	1	2	1	4	−3	**1**	

Source: UEFA
Rules for classification: Qualification tiebreakers
(H) Hosts
Notes:
13 November 2018
10:00 (11:00 EET)

Cyprus	0–0	Montenegro
	Report

Peyia Municipal Stadium, Pegeia
Attendance: 221
Referee: Cătălin Gaman (Romania)
13 November 2018
13:30 (14:30 EET)

Russia	1–1	Latvia
Agalarov 31'	Report	Ķiršs 90+2'

Stelios Kyriakides Stadium, Paphos
Attendance: 30
Referee: Ola Hobber Nilsen (Norway)

16 November 2018
10:00 (11:00 EET)

Russia	2–0	Cyprus
Moskvichyov 45'; Maslov 57'	Report

Peyia Municipal Stadium, Pegeia
Attendance: 180
Referee: Petri Viljanen (Finland)
16 November 2018
10:00 (11:00 EET)

Montenegro	1–2	Latvia
Grubac 57' (pen.)	Report	Lūsiņš 10'; Zelenkovs 81'

Stelios Kyriakides Stadium, Paphos
Attendance: 30
Referee: Cătălin Gaman (Romania)

19 November 2018
10:00 (11:00 EET)

Montenegro	0–2	Russia
	Report	Umyarov 13'; Zhironkin 75'

Stelios Kyriakides Stadium, Paphos
Attendance: 20
Referee: Ola Hobber Nilsen (Norway)
19 November 2018
10:00 (11:00 EET)

Latvia	0–1	Cyprus
	Report	Korotkovs 28' (o.g.)

Peyia Municipal Stadium, Pegeia
Attendance: 150
Referee: Petri Viljanen (Finland)

==== Group 12 ====
Pos	Team	Pld	W	D	L	GF	GA	GD	Pts	Qualification
1	Spain	3	3	0	0	10	1	+9	**9**	Elite round
2	Switzerland (H)	3	2	0	1	4	2	+2	**6**	Elite round
3	Belarus	3	1	0	2	2	4	−2	**3**	
4	Andorra	3	0	0	3	0	9	−9	**0**	

Source: UEFA
Rules for classification: Qualification tiebreakers
(H) Hosts
10 October 2018
13:00

Spain	5–0	Andorra
López 13'; Ruiz 21' (pen.); Torres 32'; Jaime 50'; Morilla 63'	Report

Leichtathletik Stadion St. Jakob, Basel
Referee: Nenad Djokić (Serbia)
10 October 2018
18:00

Belarus	0–1	Switzerland
	Report	Imeri 68' (pen.)

Leichtathletik Stadion St. Jakob, Basel
Referee: Anastasios Papapetrou (Greece)

13 October 2018
11:00

Spain	3–0	Belarus
Ruiz 4'; Blanco 28'; Gómez 60'	Report

Leichtathletik Stadion St. Jakob, Basel
Referee: Alper Ulusoy (Turkey)
13 October 2018
16:00

Switzerland	2–0	Andorra
Okafor 27' (pen.); Isufi 53'	Report

Leichtathletik Stadion St. Jakob, Basel
Referee: Nenad Djokić (Serbia)

16 October 2018
18:00

Switzerland	1–2	Spain
Marchand 62'	Report	Torres 57', 80'

Leichtathletik Stadion St. Jakob, Basel
Referee: Anastasios Papapetrou (Greece)
16 October 2018
18:00

Andorra	0–2	Belarus
	Report	Gorbach 7'; Vegerya 62'

Stadion Rankhof, Basel
Referee: Alper Ulusoy (Turkey)

==== Group 13 ====
Pos	Team	Pld	W	D	L	GF	GA	GD	Pts	Qualification
1	Greece	3	3	0	0	12	3	+9	**9**	Elite round
2	Romania	3	1	1	1	12	6	+6	**4**	Elite round
3	Bulgaria (H)	3	1	1	1	7	4	+3	**4**	
4	Gibraltar	3	0	0	3	0	18	−18	**0**	

Source: UEFA
Rules for classification: Qualification tiebreakers
(H) Hosts
14 November 2018
13:30 (14:30 EET)

Greece	4–0	Gibraltar
Tzimas 3'; Voilis 14'; Emmanouilidis 45', 86'	Report

Trace Arena, Stara Zagora
Referee: Keith Kennedy (Northern Ireland)
14 November 2018
13:30 (14:30 EET)

Romania	1–1	Bulgaria
Mihăilă 16' (pen.)	Report	Mitkov 90+8'

Hadzhi Dimitar Stadium, Sliven
Referee: Fedayi San (Switzerland)

17 November 2018
13:30 (14:30 EET)

Greece	5–3	Romania
Ioannidis 20', 46'; Tsaousis 34' (pen.); Mpotos 74'; Emmanouilidis 84'	Report	Sefer 21', 90+9'; Petrila 78'

Trace Arena, Stara Zagora
Referee: Dennis Higler (Netherlands)
17 November 2018
13:30 (14:30 EET)

Bulgaria	6–0	Gibraltar
Mitkov 8', 26'; Borukov 12', 20', 22'; Lichev 52'	Report

Hadzhi Dimitar Stadium, Sliven
Referee: Keith Kennedy (Northern Ireland)

20 November 2018
13:30 (14:30 EET)

Bulgaria	0–3	Greece
	Report	Gaitanidis 65', 69', 83' (pen.)

Hadzhi Dimitar Stadium, Sliven
Referee: Dennis Higler (Netherlands)
20 November 2018
13:30 (14:30 EET)

Gibraltar	0–8	Romania
	Report	Sefer 4', 22'; Petrila 18'; Manolache 38'; Mihăilă 45+1' (pen.), 49' (pen.), 56'; Stoica 76'

Trace Arena, Stara Zagora
Referee: Fedayi San (Switzerland)

== Elite round ==
=== Draw ===
The draw for the elite round was held on 6 December 2018, 11:00 CET (UTC+1), at the UEFA headquarters in Nyon, Switzerland.

The teams were seeded according to their results in the qualifying round. Portugal and Germany, which received byes to the elite round, were automatically seeded into Pot A. Each group contained one team from Pot A, one team from Pot B, one team from Pot C, and one team from Pot D. Teams from the same qualifying round group could not be drawn in the same group. For political reasons, Russia and Ukraine would not be drawn in the same group.

Pos	Grp	Team	Pld	W	D	L	GF	GA	GD	Pts	Seeding
1	—	Portugal	0	0	0	0	0	0	0	0	Pot A
2	—	Germany	0	0	0	0	0	0	0	0	Pot A
3	13	Greece	3	3	0	0	12	3	+9	9	Pot A
4	12	Spain	3	3	0	0	10	1	+9	9	Pot A
5	2	Italy	3	3	0	0	7	0	+7	9	Pot A
6	10	Republic of Ireland	3	3	0	0	8	2	+6	9	Pot A
7	6	France	3	2	1	0	10	2	+8	7	Pot A
8	4	Scotland	3	2	1	0	9	3	+6	7	Pot B
9	9	Serbia	3	2	1	0	9	4	+5	7	Pot B
10	1	Israel	3	2	1	0	7	3	+4	7	Pot B
11	11	Russia	3	2	1	0	5	1	+4	7	Pot B
12	3	Czech Republic	3	2	1	0	6	4	+2	7	Pot B
13	7	Hungary	3	2	1	0	4	2	+2	7	Pot B
14	10	Netherlands	3	2	0	1	12	2	+10	6	Pot B
15	5	England	3	2	0	1	7	2	+5	6	Pot C
16	8	Ukraine	3	2	0	1	6	3	+3	6	Pot C
17	5	Turkey	3	2	0	1	5	2	+3	6	Pot C
18	4	Wales	3	2	0	1	5	3	+2	6	Pot C
19	12	Switzerland	3	2	0	1	4	2	+2	6	Pot C
20	1	Azerbaijan	3	2	0	1	6	5	+1	6	Pot C
21	8	Norway	3	2	0	1	4	3	+1	6	Pot C
22	6	Belgium	3	1	2	0	8	3	+5	5	Pot D
23	3	Croatia	3	1	2	0	5	4	+1	5	Pot D
24	13	Romania	3	1	1	1	12	6	+6	4	Pot D
25	7	Slovenia	3	1	1	1	7	5	+2	4	Pot D
26	2	Denmark	3	1	1	1	3	1	+2	4	Pot D
27	9	Poland	3	1	1	1	5	4	+1	4	Pot D
28	11	Cyprus	3	1	1	1	1	2	−1	4	Pot D

Source: UEFA
Rules for classification: 1) points; 2) goal difference; 3) goals scored; 4) disciplinary points; 5) coefficient; 6) drawing of lots.

=== Groups ===
The elite round was played from 18 to 26 March 2019, during the March FIFA International Match Calendar dates.

Times are CET (UTC+1), as listed by UEFA (local times, if different, are in parentheses).

==== Group 1 ====
Pos	Team	Pld	W	D	L	GF	GA	GD	Pts	Qualification
1	Republic of Ireland	3	3	0	0	10	1	+9	9	Final tournament
2	Romania	3	1	1	1	4	5	−1	4	
3	Russia (H)	3	0	2	1	0	2	−2	2	
4	Azerbaijan	3	0	1	2	1	7	−6	1	

Source: UEFA
Rules for classification: Qualification tiebreakers
(H) Hosts
20 March 2019
10:00 (12:00 MSK)

Republic of Ireland	5–0	Romania
Afolabi 7', 64'; Smallbone 11', 53'; Petrila 57' (o.g.)	Report

Kuban Stadium, Krasnodar
Referee: Mads-Kristoffer Kristoffersen (Denmark)
20 March 2019
15:00 (17:00 MSK)

Azerbaijan	0–0	Russia
	Report

FC Krasnodar Academy Stadium pitch 5, Krasnodar
Referee: Adrien Jaccottet (Switzerland)

23 March 2019
10:00 (12:00 MSK)

Republic of Ireland	3–1	Azerbaijan
Wright 41'; Knight 63'; Afolabi 85'	Report	Guliyev 73'

Kuban Stadium, Krasnodar
Referee: Ádám Farkas (Hungary)
23 March 2019
15:00 (17:00 MSK)

Russia	0–0	Romania
	Report

FC Krasnodar Academy Stadium pitch 5, Krasnodar
Referee: Mads-Kristoffer Kristoffersen (Denmark)

26 March 2019
15:00 (17:00 MSK)

Russia	0–2	Republic of Ireland
	Report	McGuinness 45+1'; Reghba 59'

FC Krasnodar Academy Stadium pitch 5, Krasnodar
Referee: Ádám Farkas (Hungary)
26 March 2019
15:00 (17:00 MSK)

Romania	4–0	Azerbaijan
Mihăilă 7', 20'; Rus 29'; Tirlea 90+3'	Report

Kuban Stadium, Krasnodar
Referee: Adrien Jaccottet (Switzerland)

==== Group 2 ====
Pos	Team	Pld	W	D	L	GF	GA	GD	Pts	Qualification
1	Czech Republic	3	2	0	1	7	6	+1	6	Final tournament
2	Greece	3	1	1	1	5	6	−1	4 (Note: Head-to-head result: Greece 2–1 England.)	
3	England (H)	3	1	1	1	7	5	+2	4	
4	Denmark	3	0	2	1	5	7	−2	2	

Source: UEFA
Rules for classification: Qualification tiebreakers
(H) Hosts
Notes:
20 March 2019
15:00 (14:00 GMT)

England	4–1	Czech Republic
Saka 11', 56'; Guehi 49'; Loader 85'	Report	Selnar 10'

St George's Park pitch 4, Burton upon Trent
Referee: Sascha Stegemann (Germany)
20 March 2019
17:30 (16:30 GMT)

Greece	2–2	Denmark
Tsaousis 19' (pen.); Meliopoulos 37'	Report	Kaufmann 60', 72'

Loughborough University Stadium, Loughborough
Referee: Ivaylo Stoyanov (Bulgaria)

23 March 2019
15:00 (14:00 GMT)

Greece	2–1	England
Liavas 34'; Diamantis 69'	Report	Gibbs-White 90+1' (pen.)

St George's Park pitch 4, Burton upon Trent
Referee: Fran Jović (Croatia)
23 March 2019
17:30 (16:30 GMT)

Czech Republic	3–1	Denmark
Solil 13'; Šulc 46', 85'	Report	Frederiksen 58'

Loughborough University Stadium, Loughborough
Referee: Sascha Stegemann (Germany)

26 March 2019
15:00 (14:00 GMT)

Czech Republic	3–1	Greece
Zlatohlávek 27'; Hezoucky 60'; Heidenreich 90+5' (pen.)	Report	Emmanouilidis 10'

Loughborough University Stadium, Loughborough
Referee: Ivaylo Stoyanov (Bulgaria)
26 March 2019
15:00 (14:00 GMT)

Denmark	2–2	England
Madsen 45+2'; Jensen 71'	Report	Poveda 63'; Guehi 73'

St George's Park Stadium, Burton upon Trent
Referee: Fran Jović (Croatia)

==== Group 3 ====
Pos	Team	Pld	W	D	L	GF	GA	GD	Pts	Qualification
1	Norway	3	2	1	0	4	2	+2	7	Final tournament
2	Germany	3	2	0	1	5	2	+3	6	
3	Croatia (H)	3	1	0	2	5	5	0	3	
4	Hungary	3	0	1	2	0	5	−5	1	

Source: UEFA
Rules for classification: Qualification tiebreakers
(H) Hosts
20 March 2019
13:00

Norway	0–0	Hungary
	Report

Stadion Hrvatski vitezovi, Dugopolje
Referee: Karim Abed (France)
20 March 2019
15:30

Germany	2–1	Croatia
Arp 41'; Burkardt 90'	Report	Blagaić 57'

Gradski stadion, Sinj
Referee: José Luis Munuera Montero (Spain)

23 March 2019
11:00

Germany	0–1	Norway
	Report	Christensen 48'

Gradski stadion, Sinj
Referee: Bojan Pandžić (Sweden)
23 March 2019
17:00

Hungary	0–2	Croatia
	Report	Šutalo 18'; Marin 47'

Stadion Hrvatski vitezovi, Dugopolje
Referee: Karim Abed (France)

26 March 2019
14:00

Hungary	0–3	Germany
	Report	Yeboah 34', 53'; Herrmann 90+4'

Stadion Hrvatski vitezovi, Dugopolje
Referee: José Luis Munuera Montero (Spain)
26 March 2019
14:00

Croatia	2–3	Norway
Šutalo 76'; Palaversa 88' (pen.)	Report	Larsen 42', 61'; Vušković 50' (o.g.)

Gradski stadion, Sinj
Referee: Bojan Pandžić (Sweden)

==== Group 4 ====
Pos	Team	Pld	W	D	L	GF	GA	GD	Pts	Qualification
1	Spain	3	2	1	0	7	2	+5	7	Final tournament
2	Netherlands (H)	3	2	0	1	4	2	+2	6	
3	Slovenia	3	1	1	1	4	3	+1	4	
4	Wales	3	0	0	3	2	10	−8	0	

Source: UEFA
Rules for classification: Qualification tiebreakers
(H) Hosts
20 March 2019
16:30

Spain	1–1	Slovenia
Ruiz 56' (pen.)	Report	Kregar 90+1'

Sportpark Marsdijk, Assen
Referee: Michael Fabri (Italy)
20 March 2019
19:00

Wales	1–2	Netherlands
Norton 90'	Report	Familio-Castillo 26'; Van den Berg 90+2'

Sportpark De Boshoek, Hardenberg
Referee: Irfan Peljto (Bosnia and Herzegovina)

23 March 2019
13:00

Spain	5–1	Wales
Blanco 22'; Moha 27'; Torres 56', 63'; Gil 82'	Report	Cabango 40'

Sportpark De Boshoek, Hardenberg
Referee: Sergey Ivanov (Russia)
23 March 2019
16:00

Netherlands	2–0	Slovenia
Geertruida 12'; Familio-Castillo 90+1' (pen.)	Report

Sportpark Marsdijk, Assen
Referee: Irfan Peljto (Bosnia and Herzegovina)

26 March 2019
19:00

Netherlands	0–1	Spain
	Report	Marqués 90'

Sportpark De Boshoek, Hardenberg
Referee: Michael Fabri (Italy)
26 March 2019
19:00

Slovenia	3–0	Wales
Matko 23' (pen.), 55'; Prelec 34'	Report

Sportpark Marsdijk, Assen
Referee: Sergey Ivanov (Russia)

==== Group 5 ====
Pos	Team	Pld	W	D	L	GF	GA	GD	Pts	Qualification
1	France (H)	3	2	1	0	6	2	+4	7	Final tournament
2	Israel	3	2	0	1	4	3	+1	6	
3	Poland	3	0	2	1	0	1	−1	2	
4	Switzerland	3	0	1	2	2	6	−4	1	

Source: UEFA
Rules for classification: Qualification tiebreakers
(H) Hosts
20 March 2019
15:00

France	0–0	Poland
	Report

Stade de la Haye, Ballan-Miré
Referee: Alexander Harkam (Austria)
20 March 2019
17:00

Switzerland	0–3	Israel
	Report	Masarwa 47'; Karzev 85', 87'

Complexe Sportif Guy Drut, Saint-Cyr-sur-Loire
Referee: Peter Kralović (Slovakia)

23 March 2019
15:00

France	3–2	Switzerland
Ndilu 16'; Flips 45'; Abi 83'	Report	Gonzalez 32'; Ndoye 63'

Stade des Péteseilles, Avoine
Referee: Georgios Kominis (Greece)
23 March 2019
17:00

Israel	1–0	Poland
Karzev 90+3'	Report

Complexe Sportif Guy Drut, Saint-Cyr-sur-Loire
Referee: Peter Kralović (Slovakia)

26 March 2019
15:00

Israel	0–3	France
	Report	Adli 12'; Abi 56'; Marcelin 78'

Stade de la Haye, Ballan-Miré
Referee: Alexander Harkam (Austria)
26 March 2019
15:00

Poland	0–0	Switzerland
	Report

Stade des Péteseilles, Avoine
Referee: Georgios Kominis (Greece)

==== Group 6 ====
Pos	Team	Pld	W	D	L	GF	GA	GD	Pts	Qualification
1	Portugal (H)	3	3	0	0	10	0	+10	9	Final tournament
2	Scotland	3	2	0	1	7	5	+2	6	
3	Turkey	3	0	1	2	3	8	−5	1	
4	Cyprus	3	0	1	2	2	9	−7	1	

Source: UEFA
Rules for classification: Qualification tiebreakers
(H) Hosts
20 March 2019
15:00 (14:00 WET)

Turkey	1–3	Scotland
Houston 45+2' (o.g.)	Report	Rudden 7'; Deas 52'; Burroughs 87'

Estádio Dr. Machado de Matos, Felgueiras
Referee: Maurizio Mariani (Italy)
20 March 2019
17:15 (16:15 WET)

Portugal	3–0	Cyprus
Neto 53', 68' (pen.), 77'	Report

Estádio Cidade de Barcelos, Barcelos
Referee: Alan Mario Sant (Malta)

23 March 2019
16:00 (15:00 WET)

Scotland	4–0	Cyprus
Rudden 13', 52', 60'; Middleton 30'	Report

Estádio dos Arcos, Vila do Conde
Referee: Alan Mario Sant (Malta)
23 March 2019
18:00 (17:00 WET)

Portugal	3–0	Turkey
Embaló 67'; Ramos 90'; N. Tavares 90+3'	Report

Estádio da Mata Real, Paços de Ferreira
Referee: Antti Munukka (Finland)

26 March 2019
17:15 (16:15 WET)

Scotland	0–4	Portugal
	Report	Mayo 16' (o.g.); Embaló 21'; Baró 72'; João Mário 75'

Estádio do Bessa, Porto
Referee: Maurizio Mariani (Italy)
26 March 2019
17:15 (16:15 WET)

Cyprus	2–2	Turkey
Panayiotou 14'; Katsantonis 62'	Report	Takır 31'; Aydinel 90+6'

Estádio Cidade de Barcelos, Barcelos
Referee: Antti Munukka (Finland)

==== Group 7 ====
Pos	Team	Pld	W	D	L	GF	GA	GD	Pts	Qualification
1	Italy (H)	3	2	1	0	7	3	+4	7	Final tournament
2	Ukraine	3	1	1	1	8	7	+1	4 (Note: Head-to-head result: Belgium 2–5 Ukraine.)	
3	Belgium	3	1	1	1	6	7	−1	4	
4	Serbia	3	0	1	2	2	6	−4	1	

Source: UEFA
Rules for classification: Qualification tiebreakers
(H) Hosts
Notes:
20 March 2019
11:30

Ukraine	2–2	Serbia
Tsitaishvili 23'; Sikan 36'	Report	Vlahović 45', 77' (pen.)

Stadio Comunale di Caldiero, Caldiero
Referee: Rob Harvey (Republic of Ireland)
20 March 2019
15:00

Italy	2–2	Belgium
Esposito 4'; Raspadori 26'	Report	Openda 25' (pen.), 52' (pen.)

Stadio Euganeo, Padua
Referee: Petr Ardeleánu (Czech Republic)

23 March 2019
11:30

Serbia	0–2	Belgium
	Report	Openda 39' (pen.), 61'

Stadio Comunale Opitergium, Oderzo
Referee: Rob Harvey (Republic of Ireland)
23 March 2019
15:00

Italy	3–1	Ukraine
Salcedo 38'; Riccardi 45+1'; Bettella 90+6'	Report	Tsitaishvili 37'

Stadio Comunale di Abano Terme, Abano Terme
Referee: Enea Jorgji (Albania)

26 March 2019
15:00

Serbia	0–2	Italy
	Report	Piccoli 80', 84'

Stadio Euganeo, Padua
Referee: Petr Ardeleánu (Czech Republic)
26 March 2019
15:00

Belgium	2–5	Ukraine
Boussaid 10', 69'	Report	Kholod 19'; Snurnitsyn 54'; Mudryk 88', 90+5' (pen.); Tsitaishvili 90+2'

Stadio Comunale di Abano Terme, Abano Terme
Referee: Enea Jorgji (Albania)

== Qualified teams ==
The following eight teams qualified for the final tournament.

Team	Qualified as	Qualified on	Previous appearances in Under-19 Euro^{1} only U-19 era (since 2002)
Armenia	Hosts	9 December 2016	1 (2005)
Republic of Ireland	Elite round Group 1 winners	23 March 2019	2 (2002, 2011)
Czech Republic	Elite round Group 2 winners	26 March 2019	6 (2002, 2003, 2006, 2008, 2011, 2017)
Norway	Elite round Group 3 winners	26 March 2019	4 (2002, 2003, 2005, 2018)
Spain	Elite round Group 4 winners	26 March 2019	11 (**2002**, **2004**, **2006**, **2007**, 2008, 2009, 2010, **2011**, **2012**, 2013, **2015**)
France	Elite round Group 5 winners	26 March 2019	10 (2003, **2005**, 2007, 2009, **2010**, 2012, 2013, 2015, **2016**, 2018)
Portugal	Elite round Group 6 winners	26 March 2019	10 (2003, 2006, 2007, 2010, 2012, 2013, 2014, 2016, 2017, **2018**)
Italy	Elite round Group 7 winners	26 March 2019	6 (**2003**, 2004, 2008, 2010, 2016, 2018)

^{1} Bold indicates champions for that year. Italic indicates hosts for that year.

== Goalscorers ==
In the qualifying round, there were 243 goals scored in 78 matches, for an average of 3.12 goals per match. In the elite round, there were 127 goals scored in 42 matches, for an average of 3.02 goals per match. In total, there were 370 goals scored in 120 matches, for an average of 3.08 goals per match.

6 goals

- (Belgium) Loïs Openda
- (Romania) Valentin Mihăilă
- (Slovenia) Aljoša Matko

5 goals

- (Israel) Eden Karzev
- (Netherlands) Daishawn Redan
- (Serbia) Dušan Vlahović
- (Spain) Ferran Torres

4 goals

- (France) Wilson Isidor
- (Greece) Dimitrios Emmanouilidis
- (Republic of Ireland) Troy Parrott
- (Romania) Antonio Sefer
- (Scotland) Zak Rudden
- (Ukraine) Mykhailo Mudryk
- (Ukraine) Heorhiy Tsitaishvili

3 goals

- (Azerbaijan) Kamran Guliyev
- (Bulgaria) Preslav Borukov
- (Bulgaria) Mitko Mitkov
- (Croatia) Ante Palaversa
- (Croatia) Boško Šutalo
- (England) Bukayo Saka
- (France) Charles Abi
- (Georgia (country)) Giorgi Guliashvili
- (Greece) Antonis Gaitanidis
- (Italy) Giacomo Raspadori
- (Portugal) Pedro Neto
- (Republic of Ireland) Jonathan Afolabi
- (Scotland) Billy Gilmour
- (Spain) Abel Ruiz

2 goals

- (Belgium) Othman Boussaid
- (Belgium) Tom Reyners
- (Bosnia and Herzegovina) Ajdin Hasić
- (Croatia) Antonio Marin
- (Czech Republic) David Heidenreich
- (Czech Republic) Pavel Šulc
- (Czech Republic) Tomáš Zlatohlávek
- (Denmark) Victor Jensen
- (Denmark) Mikkel Kaufmann
- (Denmark) Nicolas Madsen
- (England) Marc Guehi
- (England) Danny Loader
- (England) Steven Sessegnon
- (England) Stephen Walker
- (France) Goduine Koyalipou
- (Georgia (country)) Zuriko Davitashvili
- (Germany) John Yeboah
- (Greece) Fotis Ioannidis
- (Greece) Marios Tsaousis
- (Iceland) Andri Guðjohnsen
- (Israel) Bar Arad
- (Israel) Shadi Masarwa
- (Italy) Davide Bettella
- (Italy) Roberto Piccoli
- (Italy) Alessio Riccardi
- (Kazakhstan) Lev Skvortsov
- (Netherlands) Juan Familio-Castillo
- (Netherlands) Mohamed Mallahi
- (Norway) Erik Botheim
- (Norway) Jørgen Strand Larsen
- (Portugal) Umaro Embaló
- (Republic of Ireland) William Ferry
- (Republic of Ireland) Adam Idah
- (Republic of Ireland) William Smallbone
- (Romania) Claudiu Petrila
- (Scotland) Jack Aitchison
- (Serbia) Nikola Terzić
- (Serbia) Milutin Vidosavljević
- (Slovakia) Matúš Kmeť
- (Slovakia) Dávid Strelec
- (Slovenia) Nik Prelec
- (Spain) Antonio Blanco
- (Sweden) Benjamin Mbunga-Kimpioka
- (Turkey) Onur Taha Takır
- (Ukraine) Danylo Sikan
- (Wales) Christian Norton

1 goal

- (Austria) Aldin Aganovic
- (Austria) Tobias Anselm
- (Austria) Romano Schmid
- (Azerbaijan) Tural Bayramov
- (Azerbaijan) Emil Gasimov
- (Azerbaijan) Murad Mahmudov
- (Azerbaijan) Zahid Mardanov
- (Belarus) Pavel Gorbach
- (Belarus) Roman Vegerya
- (Belgium) Matias Lloci
- (Belgium) Thierry Lutonda
- (Belgium) Brendan Schoonbaert
- (Bosnia and Herzegovina) Mateo Božić
- (Bulgaria) Emanuil Lichev
- (Croatia) Jakov Blagaić
- (Croatia) Michele Šego
- (Cyprus) Andreas Katsantonis
- (Cyprus) Nikolas Panayiotou
- (Czech Republic) Michal Fukala
- (Czech Republic) Pavel Hezoucky
- (Czech Republic) Vasil Kušej
- (Czech Republic) Ondřej Pachlopník
- (Czech Republic) Jakub Selnar
- (Czech Republic) Patrik Slaměna
- (Czech Republic) Tomáš Solil
- (Denmark) Emil Frederiksen
- (Denmark) Magnus Kaastrup
- (England) Conor Gallagher
- (England) Morgan Gibbs-White
- (England) Ian Poveda
- (Faroe Islands) Hanus Sørensen
- (France) Yacine Adli
- (France) Maxence Caqueret
- (France) Sofiane Diop
- (France) Alexis Flips
- (France) Jean Marcelin
- (France) Bridge Ndilu
- (France) Oumar Solet
- (Georgia (country)) Tamaz Babunadze
- (Georgia (country)) Giorgi Ivaniadze
- (Georgia (country)) Levan Kharabadze
- (Georgia (country)) Khvicha Kvaratskhelia
- (Germany) Fiete Arp
- (Germany) Jonathan Burkardt
- (Germany) Charles-Jesaja Herrmann
- (Greece) Apostolos Diamantis
- (Greece) Giorgos Liavas
- (Greece) Dimitrios Meliopoulos
- (Greece) Foivos Mpotos
- (Greece) Panagiotis Tzimas
- (Greece) Alexandros Voilis
- (Hungary) Szabolcs Schön
- (Hungary) Dominik Szoboszlai
- (Hungary) Norman Timári
- (Hungary) Alexander Torvund
- (Iceland) Ísak Óli Ólafsson
- (Iceland) Brynjólfur Darri Willumsson
- (Israel) Liel Abada
- (Israel) Mohammad Kanaan
- (Italy) Gabriele Corbo
- (Italy) Salvatore Esposito
- (Italy) Manolo Portanova
- (Italy) Eddie Salcedo
- (Kazakhstan) Arman Kenesov
- (Kazakhstan) Madi Zhakypbayev
- (Kosovo) Gentrit Limani
- (Latvia) Raivis Ķiršs
- (Latvia) Kristers Lūsiņš
- (Latvia) Dmitrijs Zelenkovs
- (Liechtenstein) Fabian Unterrainer
- (Lithuania) Benas Anisas
- (Luxembourg) Mathias Olesen
- (Luxembourg) Yannick Schaus
- (North Macedonia) Darko Churlinov
- (North Macedonia) Enis Fazlagikj
- (North Macedonia) Marko Gjorgjievski
- (North Macedonia) Aleks Taleski
- (Malta) Marcus Grima
- (Malta) Alexander Satariano
- (Moldova) Andrei Conohov
- (Montenegro) Sergej Grubac
- (Netherlands) Wouter Burger
- (Netherlands) Lutsharel Geertruida
- (Netherlands) Mohammed Ihattaren
- (Netherlands) Orkun Kökçü
- (Netherlands) Ole Romenij
- (Netherlands) Jurriën Timber
- (Netherlands) Sepp van den Berg
- (Northern Ireland) Alfie McCalmont
- (Northern Ireland) Caoimhin McConnell
- (Northern Ireland) Cameron Palmer
- (Northern Ireland) Harry Robinson
- (Norway) Tobias Christensen
- (Norway) Edvard Sandvik Tagseth
- (Norway) Mikael Ugland
- (Poland) Mateusz Bogusz
- (Poland) Jakub Kiwior
- (Poland) Maik Nawrocki
- (Poland) Maciej Żurawski
- (Portugal) Romário Baró
- (Portugal) João Mário
- (Portugal) Gonçalo Ramos
- (Portugal) Nuno Tavares
- (Republic of Ireland) Jason Knight
- (Republic of Ireland) Mark McGuinness
- (Republic of Ireland) Ali Reghba
- (Republic of Ireland) Tyreik Wright
- (Romania) Antonio Manolache
- (Romania) Andrei Rus
- (Romania) Alexandru Stoica
- (Romania) Alexandru Tirlea
- (Russia) Gamid Agalarov
- (Russia) Pavel Maslov
- (Russia) Vladimir Moskvichyov
- (Russia) Nail Umyarov
- (Russia) Vitali Zhironkin
- (San Marino) Diego Moretti
- (Scotland) Adedapo Awokoya-Mebude
- (Scotland) Jack Burroughs
- (Scotland) Robbie Deas
- (Scotland) Glenn Middleton
- (Scotland) Sebastian Ross
- (Scotland) Elliot Watt
- (Serbia) Dimitrije Kamenović
- (Slovakia) Miroslav Gono
- (Slovakia) Jakub Kadák
- (Slovenia) Oliver Kregar
- (Slovenia) Lan Štravs
- (Slovenia) Tamar Svetlin
- (Spain) Bryan Gil
- (Spain) Sergio Gómez
- (Spain) Iván Jaime
- (Spain) Roberto López
- (Spain) Alejandro Marqués
- (Spain) Moha
- (Spain) Pelayo Morilla
- (Sweden) Aiham Ousou
- (Sweden) Pavle Vagic
- (Switzerland) Lorenzo Gonzalez
- (Switzerland) Kastriot Imeri
- (Switzerland) Elis Isufi
- (Switzerland) Yannick Marchand
- (Switzerland) Dan Ndoye
- (Switzerland) Noah Okafor
- (Turkey) Yunus Akgün
- (Turkey) Sahan Akyuz
- (Turkey) Emre Aydinel
- (Turkey) Berkin Taşkın
- (Turkey) Ömer Uzun
- (Ukraine) Ievgenii Isaienko
- (Ukraine) Artem Kholod
- (Ukraine) Rostyslav Liakh
- (Ukraine) Igor Snurnitsyn
- (Wales) Joe Adams
- (Wales) Sam Bowen
- (Wales) Ben Cabango
- (Wales) Lewis Collins
- (Wales) Neco Williams

1 own goal

- (Belgium) Brendan Schoonbaert (against Malta)
- (Croatia) Mario Vušković (against Norway)
- (Finland) Johannes Kytilä (against Italy)
- (Latvia) Iļja Korotkovs (against Cyprus)
- (Lithuania) Ernestas Mockus (against Belgium)
- (Poland) Marcin Grabowski (against Serbia)
- (Romania) Claudiu Petrila (against Republic of Ireland)
- (San Marino) Diego Moretti (against Sweden)
- (Scotland) Jordan Houston (against Turkey)
- (Scotland) Lewis Mayo (against Portugal)
- (Serbia) Vanja Zvekanov (against Poland)
- (Wales) Brandon Cooper (against Scotland)

Source: UEFA.com
