= Juan Castillo (footballer, born 2000) =

Dominican footballer (born 2000)

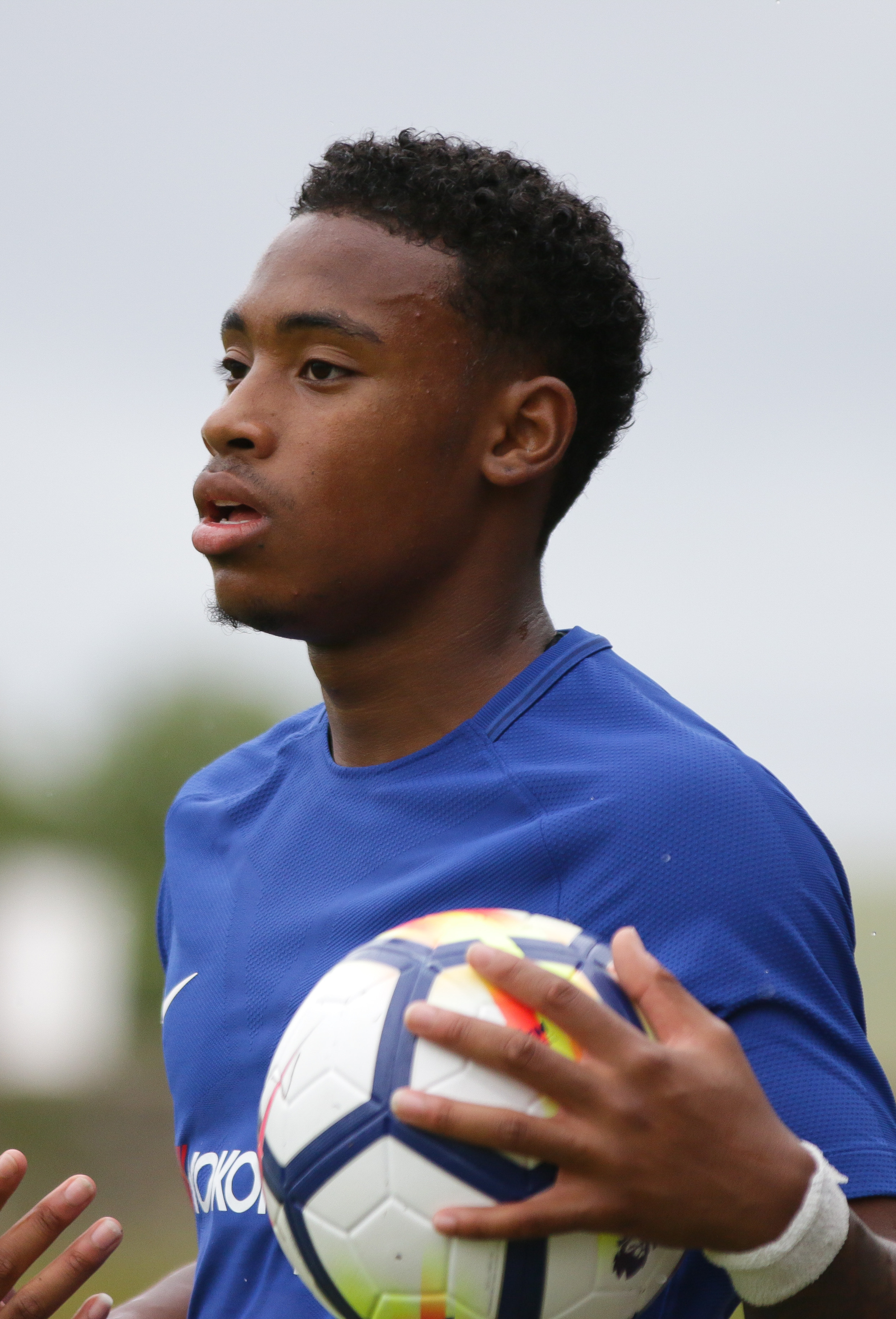
- Castillo in 2017

Personal information
- Full name: Juan Carlos Familia Bridgewater
- Birth name: Juan Carlos Familia Castillo
- Date of birth: 13 January 2000 (age 26)
- Place of birth: Amsterdam, Netherlands
- Height: 1.75 m (5 ft 9 in)
- Position: Left-back

Team information
- Current team: RKC Waalwijk
- Number: 5

Youth career
- 2007–2009: Zeeburgia
- 2009–2016: Ajax
- 2016–2019: Chelsea

Senior career*
| Years | Team | Apps | (Gls) |
| 2019–2023 | Chelsea | 0 | (0) |
| 2019–2020 | → Jong Ajax (loan) | 23 | (0) |
| 2020–2021 | → AZ (loan) | 1 | (0) |
| 2020–2021 | → Jong AZ (loan) | 6 | (0) |
| 2021 | → ADO Den Haag (loan) | 16 | (0) |
| 2021–2022 | → Birmingham City (loan) | 3 | (0) |
| 2022 | → Charlton Athletic (loan) | 2 | (0) |
| 2024– | RKC | 63 | (4) |

International career^{‡}
| 2014–2015 | Netherlands U15 | 8 | (0) |
| 2015–2016 | Netherlands U16 | 11 | (1) |
| 2016–2017 | Netherlands U17 | 10 | (3) |
| 2017–2018 | Netherlands U18 | 5 | (2) |
| 2018–2019 | Netherlands U19 | 9 | (3) |
| 2019–2020 | Netherlands U20 | 6 | (0) |
| 2025– | Dominican Republic | 14 | (0) |
- * Club domestic league appearances and goals as of 4 November 2026 ‡ National team caps and goals as of 5 October 2026

Juan Carlos Familia Bridgewater (born 13 January 2000), known as Juan Castillo, is a professional footballer who plays as a left-back for Eredivisie club RKC Waalwijk and the Dominican Republic national team.

Castillo came through Ajax's academy before joining Chelsea in 2016. He spent time on loan at Jong Ajax, for whom he made his senior debut in the Eerste Divisie, as well as at Eredivisie clubs AZ and ADO Den Haag, before joining Birmingham City on loan in 2021. He was recalled in January 2022 and joined Charlton Athletic for the rest of the season.

Born in the Netherlands, he represented his country of birth at youth international levels. In 2025, he made his senior debut for the Dominican Republic, his father's nation.

== Early life and youth career ==
Castillo was born in Amsterdam, Netherlands, where he attended Bindelmeer College. He is of Dominican Republic descent. He began playing organised football with AVV Zeeburgia before joining the Ajax Youth Academy at nine years old. He came through the ranks at Ajax, attracting interest from Manchester United as a 14-year-old, before taking up a scholarship with United's Premier League rivals, Chelsea, in 2016.

== Club career ==
=== Chelsea ===
In his first season, Castillo helped Chelsea U18 win the Professional Development League and was a member of their FA Youth Cup-winning side. He repeated that double in 2017–18, as well as playing regularly in Chelsea U19's 2017–18 UEFA Youth League campaign. He scored twice in a 4–2 win against Atlético Madrid in the group stage, converted his kick in the penalty shoot-out by which they beat Porto U19 in the semi-final, and played at left wing-back in the final, a 3–0 defeat to Barcelona. He again played regularly and scored twice in the 2018–19 edition: his goal against Montpellier helped Chelsea reach the quarter-final. Facing Porto in the final, he crossed for Daishawn Redan's header that tied the scores soon after half-time, and according to the football.london website, "showed a lot of energy and was probably the most threatening player for Chelsea" in the second half, but they lost 3–1.

Promoted to the under-23 team, Castillo made his debut in open-age football in August 2017, as a 74th-minute replacement for Cole Dasilva in the 2017–18 EFL Trophy against Plymouth Argyle, who won the match on penalties. He appeared twice more in that season's competition, scored his first goal in the quarter-final against Oxford United, and made four appearances in the 2018–19 edition, scoring once.

Castillo had signed his first professional contract with Chelsea on his 17th birthday, and ahead of the 2019–20 season, he signed for a further three years.

On 16 June 2023, Chelsea announced that Castillo would leave the club when his contract expired at the end of June.

==== Loan spells ====
Castillo returned to Ajax on loan on 30 August 2019 and was assigned to the reserve team, Jong Ajax. The deal included an option to purchase. He made his senior debut in the Eerste Divisie on 13 September, playing the whole match at left back as Jong Ajax let slip a 2–0 lead away to De Graafschap and lost 3–2. He quickly established himself in the starting eleven, and by the time the season was curtailed because of the COVID-19 pandemic with Jong Ajax fourth in the table, he had started 23 of their 29 league matches and made six assists. Ajax opted against signing Castillo on a permanent basis and he returned to his parent club.

On 6 October 2020, Castillo joined Eredivisie club AZ for the rest of the 2020–21 season. He was given squad number 19. Castillo had to wait until 27 December – the last match before the winter break – to make his debut for AZ, as an 89th-minute substitute in a 2–2 draw with FC Utrecht. It was his only appearance: due to his lack of playing time at AZ, his loan was ended on 11 January 2021.

The same day, Castillo joined another Eredivisie club, ADO Den Haag, for the rest of the 2020–21 season. He made his debut in the starting eleven for a 4–1 loss to VVV-Venlo on 13 January 2021, and went on to make 16 league appearances (9 starts) as ADO's relegation was confirmed after losing 4–1 against Willem II on 13 May.

Castillo signed a one–year contract extension with Chelsea and then, on 6 July 2021, joined EFL Championship club Birmingham City on loan for the 2021–22 season. Wearing number 23, Castillo made his debut as a second-half substitute in a 1–0 win against Sheffield United in the opening game of the season. He started in Birmingham's two EFL Cup ties, but his next appearance was not for a further three months, when he came on at right back with 25 minutes left of the visit to league leaders Coventry City "showing energy and the physical grit to throw himself into tackles" to help the side achieve a goalless draw. Manager Lee Bowyer said that Castillo had been overweight and "out of shape" when he arrived in pre-season, but his performance against Coventry had "done him no harm". He made one more appearance before the loan was terminated in January 2022.

On 21 January 2022, Castillo joined Charlton Athletic on loan for the rest of the 2021–22 season.

=== RKC Waalwijk ===
On 4 June 2024, Castillo joined Eredivisie side RKC Waalwijk on a two-year contract with the option for a further year.

== International career ==
Though born in the Netherlands, Castillo plays international football for the Dominican Republic, for which he qualifies by descent. He was a regular for the Netherlands at youth levels from under-15 to under-20. Castillo made his first appearance in international football when he started for the Netherlands under-15 team in a 2–2 draw against their Belgian counterparts on 11 November 2014. He made eight appearances at that level. He played in 11 of the under-16s' 14 matches in the 2015–16 season, taking no part in the March 2016 friendlies. He first captained the side in a 1–0 loss to France U16 in October 2015, and scored with a penalty in a 2–1 loss to USA U17 in a tournament in December.

At under-17 level, Castillo scored in all three of the Netherlands' matches – all wins – in the 2017 European Under-17 Championship qualifying round. He was a member of the squad for the championship finals in Croatia, and played in all four of their matches as they finished second in their group before being eliminated at the quarter-final stage by Germany U17. He scored three goals from ten matches at under-17 level, and played five times for the under-18s and scored twice, against Belgium and Italy.

At under-19 level, he scored three goals from nine matches, of which six matches and two goals, against Wales and Slovenia, were in the UEFA Under-19 Championship qualifying and elite rounds, but a late defeat against Spain in the final qualifier meant his team failed to reach the tournament proper. He made six appearances without scoring for the beloftenelftal – Netherlands U20 team – all in 2019.

== Career statistics ==
As of match 28 March 2026

Appearances and goals by club, season and competition
| Club | Season | League | | | National cup | | League cup | | Europe | | Other | | Total | |
| Club | Season | Division | Apps | Goals | Apps | Goals | Apps | Goals | Apps | Goals | Apps | Goals | Apps | Goals |
|---|---|---|---|---|---|---|---|---|---|---|---|---|---|---|
| Chelsea U23 | 2017–18 | — | | | — | | — | | — | | 3 (Note: Appearances in EFL Trophy) | 1 | 3 | 1 |
| Chelsea U23 | 2018–19 | — | | | — | | — | | — | | 4 | 0 | 4 | 0 |
| Chelsea U23 | 2019–20 | — | | | — | | — | | — | | 1 | 0 | 1 | 0 |
| Chelsea U23 | 2020–21 | — | | | — | | — | | — | | 1 | 0 | 1 | 0 |
| Chelsea U23 | Total | | — | | — | | — | | — | | 9 | 1 | 9 | 1 |
| Chelsea | 2019–20 | Premier League | 0 | 0 | 0 | 0 | 0 | 0 | 0 | 0 | 0 | 0 | 0 | 0 |
| Chelsea | 2020–21 | Premier League | 0 | 0 | 0 | 0 | 0 | 0 | 0 | 0 | 0 | 0 | 0 | 0 |
| Chelsea | 2021–22 | Premier League | 0 | 0 | 0 | 0 | 0 | 0 | 0 | 0 | 0 | 0 | 0 | 0 |
| Chelsea | 2022–23 | Premier League | 0 | 0 | 0 | 0 | 0 | 0 | 0 | 0 | 0 | 0 | 0 | 0 |
| Chelsea | Total | | 0 | 0 | 0 | 0 | 0 | 0 | 0 | 0 | 0 | 0 | 0 | 0 |
| Jong Ajax (loan) | 2019–20 | Eerste Divisie | 23 | 0 | — | | — | | — | | 0 | 0 | 23 | 0 |
| AZ Alkmaar (loan) | 2020–21 | Eredivisie | 1 | 0 | 0 | 0 | — | | 0 | 0 | — | | 1 | 0 |
| Jong AZ (loan) | 2020–21 | Eerste Divisie | 6 | 0 | — | | — | | — | | — | | 6 | 0 |
| ADO Den Haag (loan) | 2020–21 | Eredivisie | 16 | 0 | 1 | 0 | — | | — | | — | | 17 | 0 |
| Birmingham City (loan) | 2021–22 | Championship | 3 | 0 | 0 | 0 | 2 | 0 | — | | — | | 5 | 0 |
| Charlton Athletic (loan) | 2021–22 | League One | 2 | 0 | — | | — | | — | | 1 | 0 | 3 | 0 |
| RKC Waalwijk | 2024–25 | Eredivisie | 24 | 0 | 1 | 0 | — | | — | | — | | 25 | 0 |
| RKC Waalwijk | 2025-26 | Eerste Divisie | 29 | 2 | 3 | 1 | — | | — | | 1 | 0 | 33 | 3 |
| RKC Waalwijk | 2026-27 | Eerste Divisie | 10 | 2 | 1 | 0 | 0 | 0 | 0 | 0 | 0 | 0 | 11 | 2 |
| RKC Waalwijk | Total | | 63 | 4 | 5 | 1 | 0 | 0 | 0 | 0 | 1 | 0 | 69 | 5 |
| Career total | | | 113 | 4 | 6 | 1 | 2 | 0 | 0 | 0 | 11 | 1 | 132 | 6 |
