= Gorbach =

Gorbach (Russian: Горбач) is a surname. Notable people with the surname include:

- Alfons Gorbach (1898–1972), Austrian politician
- Hubert Gorbach (born 1956), Austrian politician
- Pavel Gorbach (born 2000), Belarusian football player
- Sherwood Gorbach (born 1934), American medical professor
- Valeriy Gorbach (born 1968), Tajikistani football player
