= 2019 UEFA European Under-19 Championship =

Եվրոպայի մինչև 19 տարեկանների 2019 թվականի առաջնության

Tournament details
- Host country: Armenia
- City: Yerevan
- Dates: 14–27 July
- Teams: 8 (from 1 confederation)
- Venues: 3 (in 1 host city)

Final positions
- Champions: Spain (11th title)
- Runners-up: Portugal

Tournament statistics
- Matches played: 15
- Goals scored: 37 (2.47 per match)
- Attendance: 52,180 (3,479 per match)
- Top scorer(s): (Portugal) Gonçalo Ramos (4 goals)

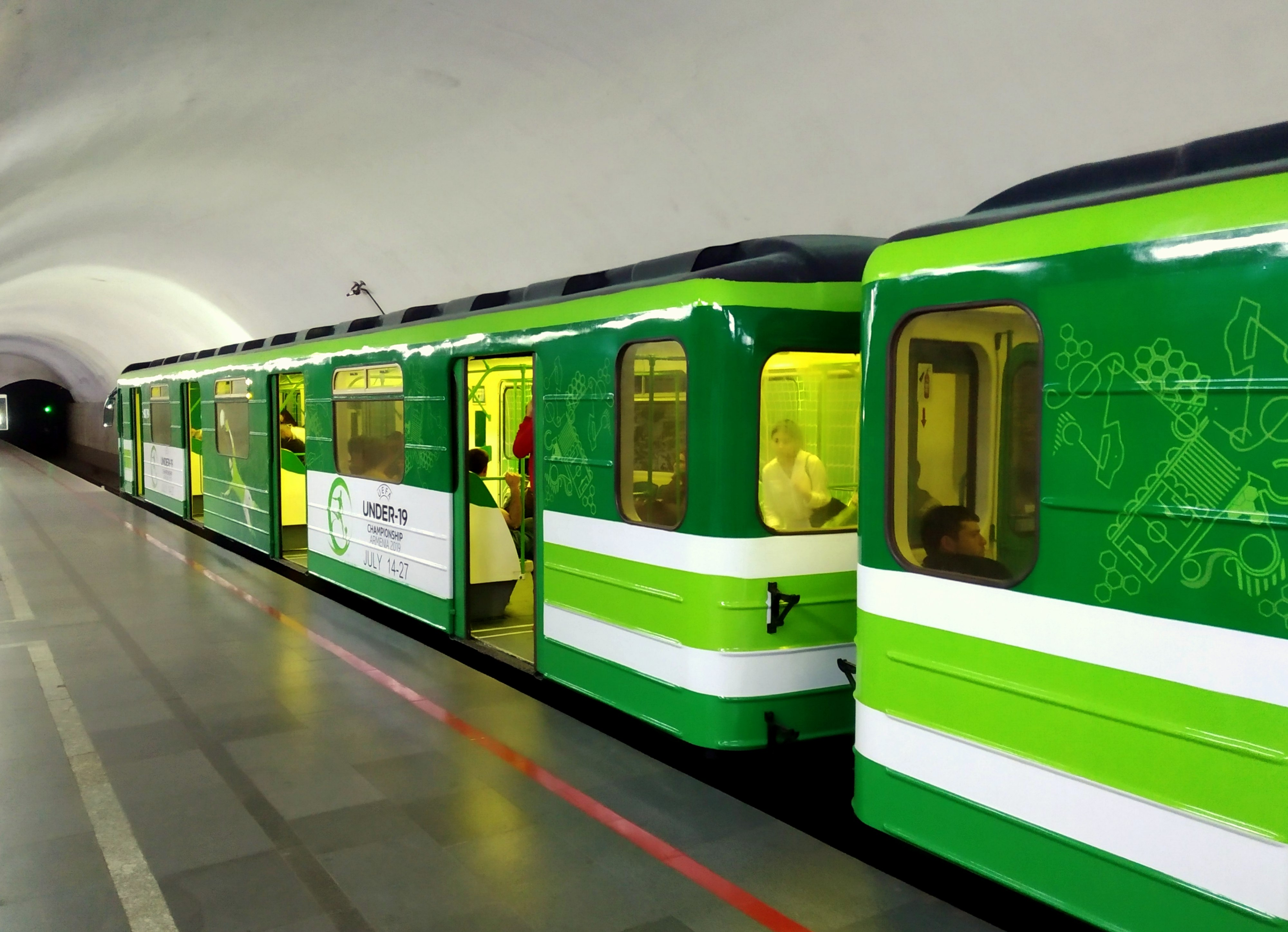
Yerevan metro train redesigned to promote the event

The 2019 UEFA European Under-19 Championship (also known as UEFA Under-19 Euro 2019) was the 18th edition of the UEFA European Under-19 Championship (68th edition if the Under-18 and Junior eras are included), the annual international youth football championship organised by UEFA for the men's under-19 national teams of Europe. Armenia, which was selected by UEFA on 9 December 2016, hosted the final tournament.

A total of eight teams played in the final tournament, with players born on or after 1 January 2000 eligible to participate. Starting from this season, up to five substitutions were permitted per team in each match.

In the final, Spain defeated defending champions Portugal 2–0 to win their 11th title (8th in the U-19 era).

== Qualification ==
All 55 UEFA nations entered the competition, and with the hosts Armenia qualifying automatically, the other 54 teams competed in the qualifying competition to determine the remaining seven spots in the final tournament. The qualifying competition consisted of two rounds: Qualifying round, which took place in autumn 2018, and Elite round, which took place in spring 2019.

=== Qualified teams ===
The following teams qualified for the final tournament.

Note: All appearance statistics include only U-19 era (since 2002).

Team	Method of qualification	Appearance	Last appearance	Previous best performance
Armenia	Hosts	2nd	2005 (group stage)	Group stage (2005)
Republic of Ireland	Elite round Group 1 winners	3rd	2011 (semi-finals)	Fourth place (2002), Semi-finals (2011)
Czech Republic	Elite round Group 2 winners	7th	2017 (semi-finals)	Runners-up (2011)
Norway	Elite round Group 3 winners	5th	2018 (group stage)	Group stage (2002, 2003, 2005, 2018)
Spain	Elite round Group 4 winners	12th	2015 (champions)	Champions (2002, 2004, 2006, 2007, 2011, 2012, 2015)
France	Elite round Group 5 winners	11th	2018 (semi-finals)	Champions (2005, 2010, 2016)
Portugal	Elite round Group 6 winners	11th	2018 (champions)	Champions (2018)
Italy	Elite round Group 7 winners	7th	2018 (runners-up)	Champions (2003)

=== Final draw ===
The final draw was held on 31 May 2019, 12:00 AMT (UTC+4), at the Armenia Marriott Hotel in Yerevan, Armenia. The eight teams were drawn into two groups of four teams. There was no seeding, except that the hosts Armenia were assigned to position A1 in the draw.

== Venues ==
On 2 April 2019, the Football Federation of Armenia announced that 3 stadiums would host the tournament matches, all located in the capital Yerevan. A special fan zone dedicated to UEFA U19 with a small football court was built on the Opera Square of Yerevan.

Yerevan
Vazgen Sargsyan Republican Stadium	Banants Stadium	Football Academy Stadium
40.171944°N 44.525833°E	40.171426°N 44.449938°E	40.221111°N 44.555278°E
Capacity: 14,403	Capacity: 4,860	Capacity: 1,428
2019 UEFA European Under-19 Championship is located in Armenia

== Match officials ==
A total of 6 referees, 8 assistant referees and 2 fourth officials were appointed for the final tournament.

Referees

- (Bosnia and Herzegovina) Irfan Peljto
- (Estonia) Kristo Tohver
- (Greece) Anastasios Papapetrou
- (Montenegro) Nikola Dabanović
- (Russia) Sergey Ivanov
- (Slovakia) Filip Glova

Assistant referees

- (Hungary) Theodoros Georgiou
- (Israel) Sagy Metzamber
- (Lithuania) Aleksandr Radius
- (Malta) Luke Portelli
- (Poland) Dawid Golis
- (Romania) Valentin Avram
- (Slovenia) Grega Kordež
- (Switzerland) Stéphane De Almeida

Fourth officials

- (Armenia) Suren Baliyan
- (Armenia) Zaven Hovhannisyan

== Squads ==
Each national team had to submit a squad of 20 players (Regulations Article 37).

== Group stage ==
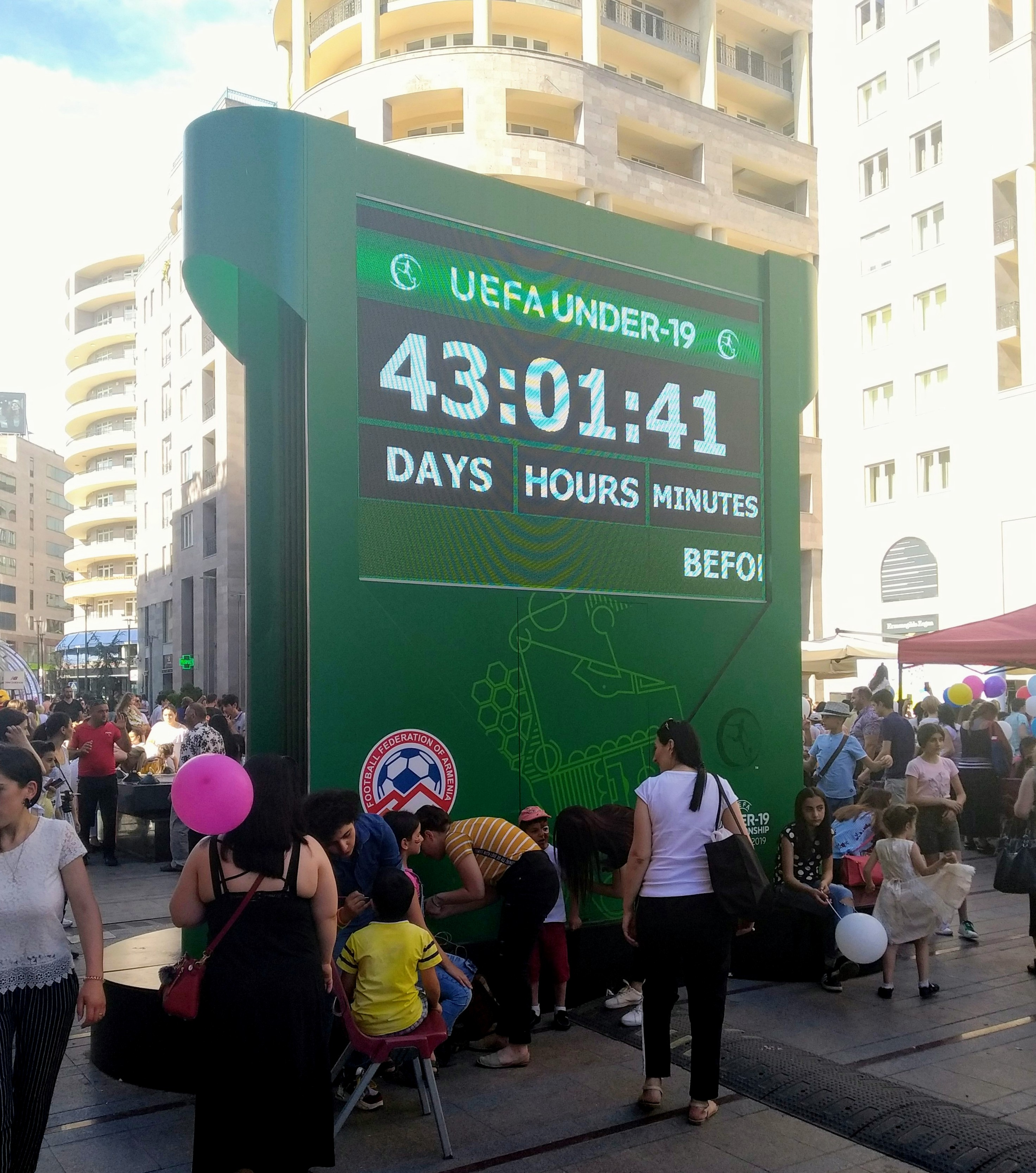
Countdown board at the centre of Yerevan before the championship

The final tournament schedule was announced on 7 June 2019.

The group winners and runners-up advanced to the semi-finals.

Tiebreakers

In the group stage, teams were ranked according to points (3 points for a win, 1 point for a draw, 0 points for a loss), and if tied on points, the following tiebreaking criteria were applied, in the order given, to determine the rankings (Regulations Articles 16.01 and 16.02):

1. Points in head-to-head matches among tied teams;
2. Goal difference in head-to-head matches among tied teams;
3. Goals scored in head-to-head matches among tied teams;
4. If more than two teams were tied, and after applying all head-to-head criteria above, a subset of teams were still tied, all head-to-head criteria above were reapplied exclusively to this subset of teams;
5. Goal difference in all group matches;
6. Goals scored in all group matches;
7. Penalty shoot-out if only two teams had the same number of points, and they met in the last round of the group and were tied after applying all criteria above (not used if more than two teams had the same number of points, or if their rankings were not relevant for qualification for the next stage);
8. Disciplinary points (red card = 3 points, yellow card = 1 point, expulsion for two yellow cards in one match = 3 points);
9. UEFA coefficient for the qualifying round draw;
10. Drawing of lots.

All times are local, AMT (UTC+4).

=== Group A ===
Pos	Team	Pld	W	D	L	GF	GA	GD	Pts	Qualification
1	Portugal	3	2	1	0	8	1	+7	7	Knockout stage
2	Spain	3	2	1	0	7	3	+4	7	Knockout stage
3	Italy	3	1	0	2	5	5	0	3	
4	Armenia (H)	3	0	0	3	1	12	−11	0	

Source: UEFA
Rules for classification: Group stage tiebreakers
(H) Hosts
14 July 2019
18:45

Armenia	1–4	Spain
Yeghiazaryan 51'	Report	Orellana 33'; Miranda 58'; Marqués 64'; Mollejo 90+7'

Vazgen Sargsyan Republican Stadium, Yerevan
Attendance: 10,200
Referee: Kristo Tohver (Estonia)
14 July 2019
21:00

Italy	0–3	Portugal
	Report	Cardoso 28'; Ramos 46'; Correia 52'

Banants Stadium, Yerevan
Attendance: 3,700
Referee: Sergey Ivanov (Russia)

17 July 2019
18:45

Portugal	1–1	Spain
Vieira 49'	Report	Miranda 41'

Banants Stadium, Yerevan
Attendance: 2,100
Referee: Anastasios Papapetrou (Greece)
17 July 2019
21:00

Armenia	0–4	Italy
	Report	Portanova 29', 56'; Merola 32'; Raspadori 69'

Vazgen Sargsyan Republican Stadium, Yerevan
Attendance: 8,780
Referee: Filip Glova (Slovakia)

20 July 2019
21:00

Portugal	4–0	Armenia
Ferreira 34' (pen.); Mário 50'; Gouveia 67', 88'	Report

Vazgen Sargsyan Republican Stadium, Yerevan
Attendance: 5,750
Referee: Nikola Dabanović (Montenegro)
20 July 2019
21:00

Spain	2–1	Italy
Gavioli 61' (o.g.); Ruiz 68' (pen.)	Report	Merola 35'

Yerevan Football Academy Stadium, Yerevan
Attendance: 1,300
Referee: Irfan Peljto (Bosnia and Herzegovina)

=== Group B ===
Pos	Team	Pld	W	D	L	GF	GA	GD	Pts	Qualification
1	France	3	3	0	0	5	0	+5	9	Knockout stage
2	Republic of Ireland	3	1	1	1	3	3	0	4	Knockout stage
3	Norway	3	0	2	1	1	2	−1	2	
4	Czech Republic	3	0	1	2	1	5	−4	1	

Source: UEFA
Rules for classification: Group stage tiebreakers
15 July 2019
18:45

Norway	1–1	Republic of Ireland
Botheim 8'	Report	Hodge 81'

Yerevan Football Academy Stadium, Yerevan
Attendance: 1,100
Referee: Nikola Dabanović (Montenegro)
15 July 2019
21:00

Czech Republic	0–3	France
	Report	Flips 41' (pen.); Heidenreich 48' (o.g.); Abi 52'

Vazgen Sargsyan Republican Stadium, Yerevan
Attendance: 2,000
Referee: Irfan Peljto (Bosnia and Herzegovina)

18 July 2019
18:45

Czech Republic	0–0	Norway
	Report

Yerevan Football Academy Stadium, Yerevan
Attendance: 700
Referee: Sergey Ivanov (Russia)
18 July 2019
21:00

Republic of Ireland	0–1	France
	Report	Isidor 83'

Banants Stadium, Yerevan
Attendance: 1,820
Referee: Kristo Tohver (Estonia)

21 July 2019
21:00

Republic of Ireland	2–1	Czech Republic
Afolabi 35'; Coffey 81'	Report	Kušej 79'

Yerevan Football Academy Stadium, Yerevan
Attendance: 700
Referee: Anastasios Papapetrou (Greece)
21 July 2019
21:00

France	1–0	Norway
Ngoumou 61'	Report

Banants Stadium, Yerevan
Attendance: 1,780
Referee: Filip Glova (Slovakia)

== Knockout stage ==
In the knockout stage, extra time and a penalty shoot-out were used to decide the winner, if necessary.

=== Bracket ===
Semi-finals
24 July – Banants Stadium
Portugal	4
Republic of Ireland	0
24 July – Republican Stadium
France	0 (3)
Spain (p)	0 (4)

Final
27 July – Republican Stadium
Portugal	0
Spain	2

=== Semi-finals ===
24 July 2019
18:00

Portugal	4–0	Republic of Ireland
Ferreira 31' (pen.); Ramos 45+2', 59', 90+6'	Report

Banants Stadium, Yerevan
Attendance: 750
Referee: Kristo Tohver (Estonia)

24 July 2019
21:00

France	0–0 (a.e.t.)	Spain
	Report
Penalties
Begraoui (penalty scored); Isidor (penalty missed); Caqueret (penalty missed); Ndicka (penalty scored); Marcelin (penalty scored)	3–4	(penalty scored) Mollejo; (penalty scored) Marqués; (penalty missed) Guillamón; (penalty scored) Orellana; (penalty scored) Torres

Vazgen Sargsyan Republican Stadium, Yerevan
Attendance: 4,350
Referee: Sergey Ivanov (Russia)

=== Final ===
27 July 2019
20:30

Portugal	0–2	Spain
	Report	Torres 34', 51'

Vazgen Sargsyan Republican Stadium, Yerevan
Attendance: 7,150
Referee: Irfan Peljto (Bosnia and Herzegovina)

== Goalscorers ==
There were 37 goals scored in 15 matches, for an average of 2.47 goals per match.

4 goals

- (Portugal) Gonçalo Ramos

2 goals

- (Italy) Davide Merola
- (Italy) Manolo Portanova
- (Portugal) Vítor Ferreira
- (Portugal) Tiago Gouveia
- (Spain) Juan Miranda
- (Spain) Ferran Torres

1 goal

- (Armenia) Arsen Yeghiazaryan
- (Czech Republic) Vasil Kušej
- (France) Charles Abi
- (France) Alexis Flips
- (France) Wilson Isidor
- (France) Nathan Ngoumou
- (Italy) Giacomo Raspadori
- (Norway) Erik Botheim
- (Portugal) Gonçalo Cardoso
- (Portugal) Félix Correia
- (Portugal) João Mário
- (Portugal) Fábio Vieira
- (Republic of Ireland) Jonathan Afolabi
- (Republic of Ireland) Barry Coffey
- (Republic of Ireland) Joe Hodge
- (Spain) Alejandro Marqués
- (Spain) Víctor Mollejo
- (Spain) Jandro Orellana
- (Spain) Abel Ruiz

1 own goal

- (Czech Republic) David Heidenreich (against France)
- (Italy) Lorenzo Gavioli (against Spain)

== Team of the tournament ==
The UEFA technical observers selected the following 11 players for the team of the tournament:

Goalkeeper	Defenders	Midfielders	Forwards
(Spain) Arnau Tenas	(Spain) Víctor Gómez; (Spain) Eric García; (France) Oumar Solet; (Spain) Juan Miranda	(France) Maxence Caqueret; (Spain) Antonio Blanco; (Portugal) Fábio Vieira	(Spain) Ferran Torres; (Republic of Ireland) Jonathan Afolabi; (Portugal) Félix Correia

== Broadcasting ==
All 15 live matches and highlights were available on UEFA.tv for all territories around the world.

=== Europe ===
Territory	Rights holder
Albania	RTSH
Armenia	1TV
Austria	ORF
Balkans	Sport Klub
Belarus	Belteleradio
Belgium	RTBF; VRT
Bulgaria	BNT
Czech Republic	ČT
Denmark	DR
Estonia	ERR
Finland	Yle
France	L'Équipe
Germany	Sport1
Hungary	MTVA
Iceland	RÚV
Ireland	RTÉ
Israel	Charlton
Italy	RAI
Kosovo	RTK
Latvia	LTV
Lithuania	LRT
Malta	PBS
Netherlands	NOS
Norway	NRK
Poland	TVP
Portugal	RTP
Romania	TVR
Russia	Match TV
Slovakia	RTVS
Spain	RTVE
Sweden	SVT
Switzerland	SRG SSR
Turkey	TRT
United Kingdom	BBC
Ukraine	UA:PBC

=== Over Europe ===
Territory	Rights holder
China	CCTV
Latin America	ESPN
MENA	beIN Sports
United States	ESPN; Univision
