= Maciej Żurawski (footballer, born 2000) =

Polish footballer (born 2000)

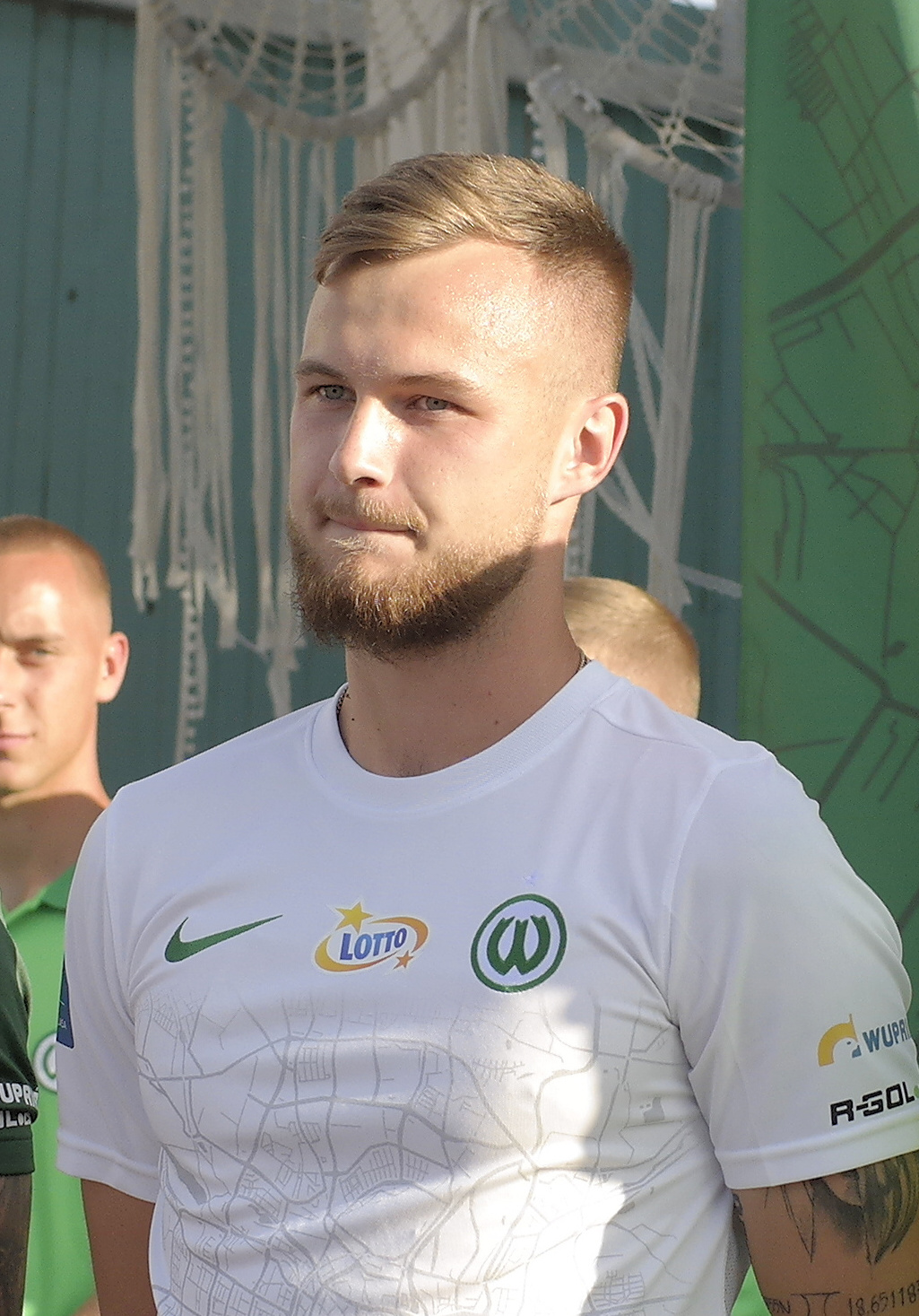
- Maciej Żurawski in 2023 with Warta Poznań

Personal information
- Full name: Maciej Żurawski
- Date of birth: 22 December 2000 (age 25)
- Place of birth: Toruń, Poland
- Height: 1.84 m (6 ft 0 in)
- Position: Midfielder

Team information
- Current team: Sandecja Nowy Sącz
- Number: 6

Youth career
- Włókniarz Toruń
- 2011–2014: Elana Toruń
- 2014–2016: Włókniarz Toruń
- 2016–2017: Pogoń Szczecin

Senior career*
Years	Team	Apps	(Gls)
2017–2022	Pogoń Szczecin II	40	(3)
2018–2022	Pogoń Szczecin	37	(4)
2021	→ Warta Poznań (loan)	15	(0)
2022–2025	Warta Poznań	86	(9)
2025–2026	Ruch Chorzów	12	(0)
2026–	Sandecja Nowy Sącz	18	(3)

International career
2017	Poland U17	6	(0)
2017–2018	Poland U18	8	(0)
2018–2019	Poland U18	10	(1)
2021–2022	Poland U21	5	(1)
- * Club domestic league appearances and goals as of 14:27, 6 June 2026 (UTC)

Maciej Żurawski (born 22 December 2000) is a Polish professional footballer who plays as a midfielder for II liga club Sandecja Nowy Sącz.

== Career ==
Żurawski joined Warta Poznań on a permanent basis in 2022.

On 2 July 2025, Żurawski moved to I liga club Ruch Chorzów on a one-year contract, with a one-year extension option.

On 3 January 2026, he signed with II liga side Sandecja Nowy Sącz until June 2027, with an option for another year.

== Career statistics ==
As of match played 6 June 2026

Appearances and goals by club, season and competition
Club	Season	League			Polish Cup		Continental		Other		Total	
Club	Season	Division	Apps	Goals	Apps	Goals	Apps	Goals	Apps	Goals	Apps	Goals
Pogoń Szczecin II	2017–18	III liga, gr. II	11	0	—		—		—		11	0
Pogoń Szczecin II	2018–19	III liga, gr. II	17	3	—		—		—		17	3
Pogoń Szczecin II	2019–20	III liga, gr. II	8	0	—		—		—		8	0
Pogoń Szczecin II	2020–21	III liga, gr. II	2	0	—		—		—		2	0
Pogoń Szczecin II	2021–22	III liga, gr. II	2	0	—		—		—		2	0
Pogoń Szczecin II	Total		40	3	—		—		—		40	3
Pogoń Szczecin	2018–19	Ekstraklasa	1	0	—		—		—		1	0
Pogoń Szczecin	2019–20	Ekstraklasa	9	0	0	0	—		—		9	0
Pogoń Szczecin	2020–21	Ekstraklasa	7	1	1	0	—		—		8	1
Pogoń Szczecin	2021–22	Ekstraklasa	20	3	1	0	0	0	—		21	3
Pogoń Szczecin	Total		37	4	2	0	0	0	—		39	4
Warta Poznań (loan)	2020–21	Ekstraklasa	15	0	1	0	—		—		16	0
Warta Poznań	2022–23	Ekstraklasa	31	4	2	0	—		—		33	4
Warta Poznań	2023–24	Ekstraklasa	29	4	1	0	—		—		30	4
Warta Poznań	2024–25	I liga	26	1	2	0	—		—		28	1
Warta Poznań	Total		86	9	5	0	—		—		91	9
Ruch Chorzów	2025–26	I liga	12	0	0	0	—		—		12	0
Sandecja Nowy Sącz	2025–26	II liga	16	3	—		—		2 (Note: Appearances in II liga promotion play-offs)	0	18	3
Career total			206	19	8	0	0	0	2	0	216	19
