= Alexandros Voilis =

Greek association footballer

Personal information
- Date of birth: 26 May 2000 (age 26)
- Place of birth: Mandra, Attica, Greece
- Height: 1.87 m (6 ft 2 in)
- Position: Forward

Team information
- Current team: Marko
- Number: 73

Youth career
- 2012–2018: Olympiacos

Senior career*
Years	Team	Apps	(Gls)
2018–2021	Olympiacos	0	(0)
2020	→ Casa Pia (loan)	8	(2)
2020–2021	→ Jeunesse Esch (loan)	30	(7)
2021–2023	Olympiacos B	35	(8)
2023–2025	Panetolikos	11	(0)
2025–2026	Panionios	23	(5)
2026–	Marko	0	(0)

International career^{‡}
2016–2017	Greece U16	4	(2)
2016–2018	Greece U17	12	(1)
2018–2019	Greece U18	3	(1)
2018–2019	Greece U19	9	(2)
- * Club domestic league appearances and goals as of 1 October 2026 ‡ National team caps and goals as of 20 November 2018

Alexandros Voilis (Greek: Αλέξανδρος Βοΐλης; born 26 May 2000) is a Greek professional footballer who plays as a forward for Super League 2 club Marko.
