= Brendan Schoonbaert =

Belgian footballer (born 2000)

Personal information
- Date of birth: 9 May 2000 (age 26)
- Place of birth: Tielt, Belgium
- Position: Centre-back

Team information
- Current team: Zelzate
- Number: 8

Youth career
- 2000–2007: Eendracht Aalter
- 2007–2008: Zulte Waregem
- 2008–2018: Club Brugge

Senior career*
Years	Team	Apps	(Gls)
2018–2020	Club Brugge	0	(0)
2019–2020	→ Lommel (loan)	1	(0)
2020	→ Deinze (loan)	0	(0)
2020–2022	Waasland-Beveren	39	(2)
2022–2024	Knokke	46	(4)
2024–	Zelzate	45	(4)

International career
2015	Belgium U15	1	(0)
2015–2016	Belgium U16	5	(0)
2016–2017	Belgium U17	2	(0)
2017	Belgium U18	5	(1)
2018–2019	Belgium U19	5	(1)
- * Club domestic league appearances and goals as of 3 May 2026

Brendan Schoonbaert (born 9 May 2000) is a Belgian professional footballer who plays as a centre-back for Zelzate. He progressed through Club Brugge's youth academy, and later played for several lower-tier clubs in Belgium.

== Career ==
=== Club Brugge ===
Schoonbaert progressed through the youth systems of Eendracht Aalter, Zulte Waregem, and Club Brugge. In the summer of 2019, he was involved in the first-team preparations under newly appointed head coach Philippe Clement. He scored in an early pre-season friendly against KFC Heist and was included in the senior squad's training camp in Garderen. Following this, he remained with the first team alongside fellow youth players Charles De Ketelaere, Ignace Van der Brempt, and Maxim De Cuyper. Despite a promising pre-season, his performances were slightly marred by an own goal in a friendly against Deinze.

In September 2019, Schoonbaert was loaned to Lommel for the season. He made his debut on 26 September 2019 in a Belgian Cup match against Standard Liège, starting under head coach Stefán Gíslason. He subsequently started in a league fixture against Roeselare. However, the loan was terminated midway through the season, and he joined Deinze on a new loan agreement. Due to the early cancellation of the season as a result of the COVID-19 pandemic, he did not make an official appearance for the club, which was crowned champions of the Belgian First Amateur Division.

=== Waasland-Beveren ===
In July 2020, Schoonbaert signed with Waasland-Beveren. He secured a starting position in central defence under coach Nicky Hayen. Despite his initial involvement, the club was relegated to the Belgian First Division B at the end of the season. The following campaign saw a decrease in playing time due to an early-season injury and a red card received during a match against Virton.

The club exercised the option to extend his contract in April 2022, but by the summer, Schoonbaert was informed he was no longer part of the club's future plans.

=== Later career ===
In July 2022, Schoonbaert signed a two-year contract with Knokke. He was sent off in his first official appearance for the club during a Belgian Cup match against ASV Geel.

After leaving Knokke as a free agent in 2024, he joined amateur club Zelzate in late August 2024.
