= Stadion Jožky Silného =

Football stadium in Kroměříž, Czech Republic

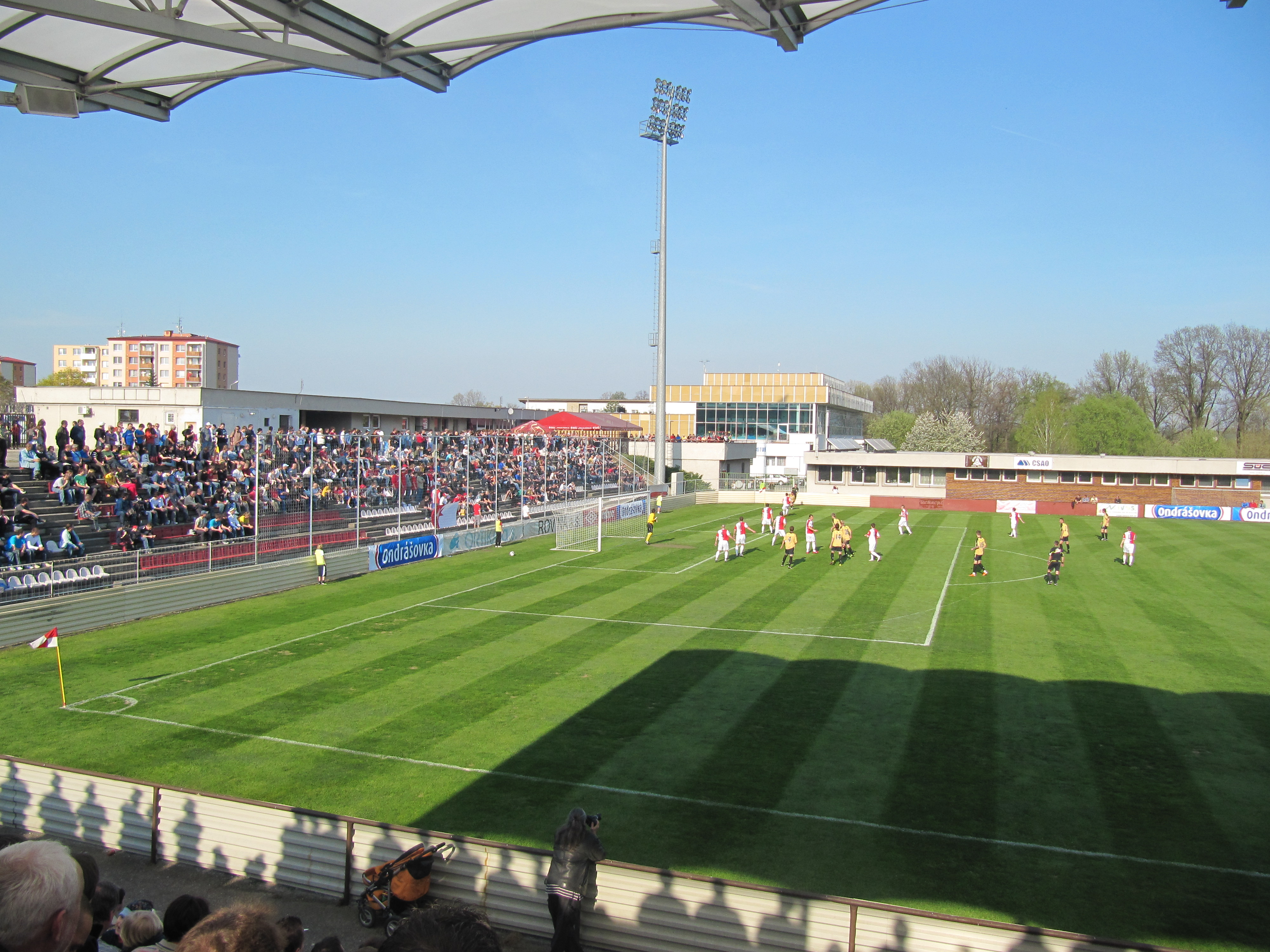
- Interactive map of Stadion Jožky Silného
- Location: Obvodová 3607, Kroměříž, Czech Republic, 767 01
- Coordinates: 49°17′23.58″N 17°24′8.59″E
- Capacity: 1,529 (700 seated)

Construction
- Opened: 1989

Tenant
- SK Hanácká Slavia Kroměříž

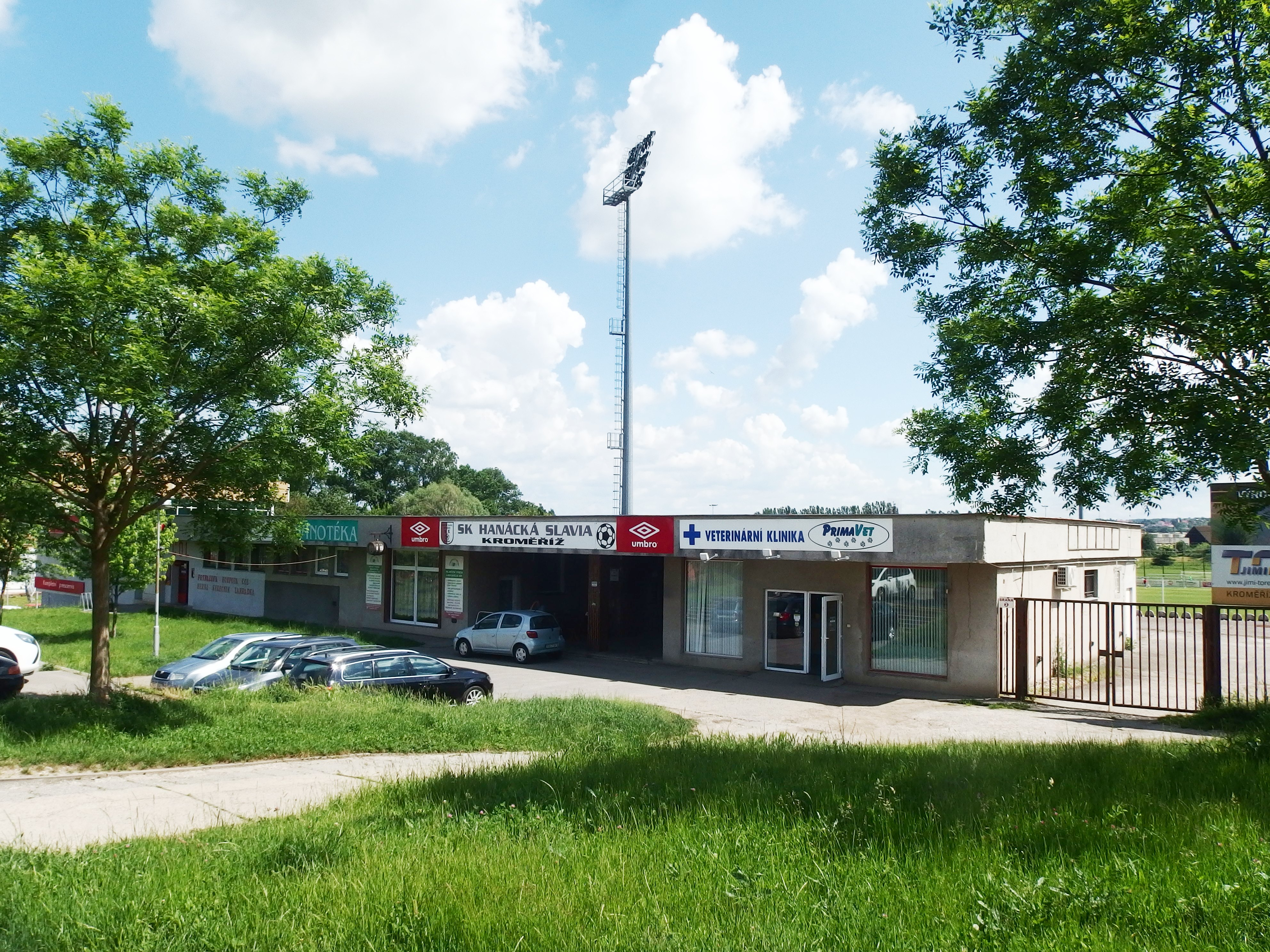
Entrance to the stadium

Stadion Jožky Silného is a football stadium in Kroměříž, Czech Republic. It is the home ground of SK Hanácká Slavia Kroměříž. The stadium holds 1,529 people, with a seated capacity of 700.

Until 2022, the stadium was named Stadion SK Hanácká Slavia Kroměříž, after its home club. Since 2022, it bears the name of Josef "Jožka" Silný, a notable footballer that was born in Kroměříž and played for Hanácká Slavia Kroměříž.
