= Matias Lloci =

Belgian footballer

Personal information
- Date of birth: 22 April 2000 (age 26)
- Place of birth: Aalst, Belgium
- Height: 1.82 m (6 ft 0 in)
- Position: Midfielder

Team information
- Current team: Lokeren
- Number: 19

Youth career
- –2015: Zulte Waregem
- 2015–2020: Gent

Senior career*
Years	Team	Apps	(Gls)
2020–2022	Westerlo	5	(0)
2021–2022	→ Omonia Aradippou (loan)	4	(0)
2022–2023	Virton	2	(0)
2024–2025	Teuta Durrës	49	(8)
2025–	Lokeren	24	(1)

International career
2016	Belgium U17	3	(0)
2018	Belgium U18	1	(0)
2017–2018	Belgium U19	6	(1)
- * Club domestic league appearances and goals as of 20 April 2026

Matias Lloci (born 22 April 2000) is a Belgian professional footballer who plays as a midfielder for Challenger Pro League club Lokeren.

== Club career ==
On 8 August 2022, Lloci signed with Virton.

On 17 September 2025, Lloci joined Lokeren on a one-season deal.

== Style of play ==
He plays on the right side of the pitch, primarily as a wide midfielder and full-back.

== Personal life ==
Born in Belgium, Lloci is of Albanian descent.
