= Georgios Liavas =

Greek footballer

Giorgos Liavas
Personal information
- Date of birth: 12 February 2001 (age 25)
- Place of birth: Xiromero, Aetolia-Acarnania, Greece
- Height: 1.81 m (5 ft 11 in)
- Positions: Defensive midfielder; centre-back

Team information
- Current team: Rio Ave
- Number: 54

Youth career
- 2014–2018: Panetolikos

Senior career*
| Years | Team | Apps | (Gls) |
| 2018–2025 | Panetolikos | 136 | (8) |
| 2025– | Rio Ave | 26 | (0) |

International career^{‡}
| 2017 | Greece U16 | 4 | (0) |
| 2017 | Greece U17 | 3 | (0) |
| 2018–2019 | Greece U19 | 13 | (2) |
| 2019–2020 | Greece U21 | 3 | (0) |
- * Club domestic league appearances and goals as of 15 August 2026 ‡ National team caps and goals as of 24 November 2025

Georgios Liavas (Greek: Γεώργιος Λιάβας; born 12 February 2001) is a Greek professional footballer who plays as a defensive midfielder or centre-back for Primeira Liga club Rio Ave.

== Career ==
=== Panetolikos ===
Liavas made his debut at the start of the 2018–19 season and became a mainstay in a solid Panetolikos side under Traianos Dellas. At age 17, Liavas became the second youngest Panetolikos player in the Super League. He can play either right back, left back, and defensive midfield, and became one of Panetolikos’ most prized assets.

Liavas suffered a serious knee injury in January 2021, followed by a similar injury to his other knee, which kept him from playing for over a year. He returned to play regularly for Panetolikos in May 2022.

== Style of play ==
Liavas is a versatile player, who can play in either the left back, right back and defensive midfielder positions.

== Career statistics ==
=== Club ===
As of 18 April 2026

| Club | Season | League | | | Cup | | Continental | | Other | | Total | |
| Club | Season | Division | Apps | Goals | Apps | Goals | Apps | Goals | Apps | Goals | Apps | Goals |
|---|---|---|---|---|---|---|---|---|---|---|---|---|
| Panetolikos | 2018–19 | Super League Greece | 19 | 0 | 3 | 0 | — | | — | | 22 | 0 |
| Panetolikos | 2019–20 | Super League Greece | 19 | 0 | 2 | 0 | — | | — | | 21 | 0 |
| Panetolikos | 2020–21 | Super League Greece | 19 | 1 | 1 | 0 | — | | — | | 20 | 1 |
| Panetolikos | 2021–22 | Super League Greece | 1 | 0 | 0 | 0 | — | | — | | 1 | 0 |
| Panetolikos | 2022–23 | Super League Greece | 15 | 1 | 1 | 0 | — | | — | | 16 | 1 |
| Panetolikos | 2023–24 | Super League Greece | 31 | 2 | 6 | 0 | — | | — | | 37 | 2 |
| Panetolikos | 2024–25 | Super League Greece | 32 | 4 | 1 | 0 | — | | — | | 33 | 4 |
| Panetolikos | Total | | 136 | 8 | 14 | 0 | 0 | 0 | — | | 150 | 8 |
| Rio Ave F.C. | 2025–26 | Primeira Liga | 23 | 0 | 0 | 0 | — | | — | | 23 | 0 |
| Career total | | | 159 | 8 | 14 | 0 | 0 | 0 | 0 | 0 | 173 | 8 |
