= Roman Vegerya =

Belarusian footballer (born 2000)

Personal information
- Date of birth: 14 July 2000 (age 26)
- Place of birth: Grodno, Belarus
- Height: 1.82 m (6 ft 0 in)
- Position: Defender

Team information
- Current team: Shurtan

Youth career
- 2014–2015: Neman Grodno
- 2015–2017: RGUOR Minsk

Senior career*
Years	Team	Apps	(Gls)
2017–2020	Neman Grodno	16	(0)
2018	→ Lida (loan)	11	(1)
2020–2021	Malorita	0	(0)
2020	→ Isloch Minsk Raion (loan)	1	(0)
2021	→ Rukh Brest (loan)	0	(0)
2021	→ Arsenal Dzerzhinsk (loan)	17	(0)
2022	Arsenal Dzerzhinsk	29	(1)
2023	Torpedo-BelAZ Zhodino	3	(0)
2023–2024	Spartak Kostroma	28	(1)
2024–2025	Arsenal Dzerzhinsk	45	(2)
2026–	Shurtan	0	(0)

International career^{‡}
2016–2017	Belarus U17	6	(0)
2017–2018	Belarus U19	5	(1)
2019–2022	Belarus U21	17	(0)
2020	Belarus	1	(0)
- * Club domestic league appearances and goals as of 19 March 2026 ‡ National team caps and goals as of 8 June 2022

Roman Vegerya (Belarusian: Раман Вягера; Russian: Роман Вегеря; born 14 July 2000) is a Belarusian professional footballer who plays for Uzbekistan Pro League club Shurtan.

== International career ==
Vegerya earned his first cap for the national team of his country on 26 February 2020, coming on as a last-minute substitute in the 1–0 away win over Bulgaria in a friendly match.
