= Dimitrios Meliopoulos =

Greek footballer (born 2000)

Dimitris Meliopoulos
Personal information
- Full name: Dimitrios Meliopoulos
- Date of birth: 22 March 2000 (age 26)
- Place of birth: Vergina, Greece
- Height: 1.84 m (6 ft 0 in)
- Position: Defensive midfielder

Team information
- Current team: Anagennisi Arta

Youth career
- 2010–2015: PAOK Koulouras
- 2015–2017: Xanthi

Senior career*
Years	Team	Apps	(Gls)
2017–2019	Xanthi	28	(0)
2019	PAOK	0	(0)
2023	Thyella Katsikas	12	(0)
2024	Apollon Smyrnis	12	(1)
2024–2025	Agrotikos Kastritsa		
2025	Karystos		
2025–2026	Veria		
2026–	Anagennisi Arta		

International career^{‡}
2016	Greece U16	3	(0)
2016–2017	Greece U17	9	(2)
2018	Greece U18	4	(0)
2017	Greece U19	20	(2)
- * Club domestic league appearances and goals as of 14 April 2024 ‡ National team caps and goals as of 26 March 2019

Dimitrios Meliopoulos (Greek: Δημήτριος Μελιόπουλος; born 22 March 2000) is a Greek footballer who plays as a defensive midfielder for Gamma Ethniki club Anagennisi Arta.

== Career ==
=== Xanthi ===
On 4 November 2017, Meliopoulos made his debut in Super League at the age of 17, as a substitute in a 3–1 away win against Panetolikos.

=== PAOK ===
According to rumours, PAOK will be turning their attention to signing youngsters that have the potential for a bright future at the club. PAOK’s first transfer target in January 2019 will be securing 18-year-old Xanthi midfielder Dimitris Meliopoulos. With both clubs still negotiating the deal at this point in time, it is unclear whether Meliopoulos will join the club next month in the January transfer period or at the end of the 2018–19 Super League campaign in June. He did sign for the Thessaloniki club in May 2019, but after not featuring in the new head coach's plans and being told he would be sent on loan, he shockingly announced his retirement from the sport two months later, at the age of just 19. Meliopoulos has been a regular for the Greece U19s national team as a defensive midfielder.
