= Pavel Gorbach =

Belarusian footballer

Personal information
- Date of birth: 13 March 2000 (age 26)
- Place of birth: Grodno, Belarus
- Height: 1.79 m (5 ft 10 in)
- Position: Forward

Youth career
- 2014–2017: Minsk

Senior career*
Years	Team	Apps	(Gls)
2017–2021	Minsk	29	(0)
2022–2024	Smorgon	60	(4)
2025	Belshina Bobruisk	15	(0)
2026	Smorgon	9	(1)

International career^{‡}
2016–2017	Belarus U17	6	(1)
2017–2018	Belarus U19	5	(1)
- * Club domestic league appearances and goals as of 1 September 2026 ‡ National team caps and goals as of 16 October 2018

Pavel Gorbach (Belarusian: Павел Горбач; Russian: Павел Горбач; born 13 March 2000) is a Belarusian footballer.
