= David Heidenreich (footballer) =

Czech footballer (born 2000)

Personal information
- Date of birth: 24 June 2000 (age 26)
- Place of birth: Czech Republic
- Height: 1.91 m (6 ft 3 in)
- Position: Defender

Team information
- Current team: Bohemians 1905
- Number: 8

Youth career
- Teplice
- 2016–2020: Atalanta

Senior career*
Years	Team	Apps	(Gls)
2020–2023	Atalanta	0	(0)
2020–2021	→ Teplice (loan)	9	(1)
2021–2022	→ SPAL (loan)	3	(0)
2022–2023	→ Jablonec (loan)	20	(0)
2023–2025	Hradec Králové	7	(0)
2025	→ Tatran Prešov (loan)	0	(0)
2026–	Bohemians 1905	0	(0)

International career^{‡}
2017	Czech Republic U17	2	(0)
2017–2018	Czech Republic U18	5	(1)
2017–2019	Czech Republic U19	17	(4)
2019	Czech Republic U20	1	(0)
2022	Czech Republic U21	2	(0)
- * Club domestic league appearances and goals as of 17 July 2024 ‡ National team caps and goals as of 17 July 2024

David Heidenreich (born 24 June 2000) is a Czech professional footballer who plays as a defender for Czech First League club Bohemians 1905.

== Career ==
On 24 August 2021 he joined SPAL on loan. On 16 July 2022 Heidenreich joined Jablonec on a one-year loan.

On 11 July 2023, Heidenreich signed a three-year contract with Hradec Králové.

On 16 June 2025, Heidenreich joined Tatran Prešov on a loan deal until 30 June 2026.

On 13 July 2026, Heidenreich signed a one-year contract with Bohemians 1905 as a free agent.
