= Kelme CF =

Association football club in Spain

- Full name: Kelme Club de Fútbol
- Nickname(s): Kelmesitos
- Founded: 1974; 51 years ago
- Ground: Polideportivo de Altabix, Elche, Spain
- Capacity: 500
- Chairman: Enrique Cervera
- League: División de Honor – Group 7
- 2023–24: División de Honor – Group 7, 9th of 16
- Website: kelmecf.com
Home colours

Kelme Club de Fútbol is a Spanish football club located in Elche, Alicante Province. It is a club with strong philosophy of football academy and does not have a senior team.

Kelme CF derives its name from the sportswear firm Kelme. The philosophy of the club is to train young players, and have a complete structure grassroots level. It has an agreement with La Liga club Villarreal.

== Former players ==
- (Spain) Miguel de las Cuevas
- (Spain) Thiago
- (Spain) Juan Manuel Ortiz
- (Spain) Juanfran
- (Equatorial Guinea) Carlos Akapo
- (Morocco) Abdessamad Ezzalzouli
- (Spain) Óscar Rico
- (Spain) Pablo de Lucas
- (Spain) Tonino
- (Spain) Rafa Gómez
- (Ecuador) Erick Ferigra

== Season to season ==
=== Senior ===
Season	Tier	Division	Place	Copa del Rey
1980–81	7	2ª Reg.	4th	
1981–82	6	1ª Reg.	8th	
1982–83	6	1ª Reg.	13th	
1983–84	6	1ª Reg.	15th	
1984–85	6	1ª Reg.	8th	
1985–86	6	1ª Reg.	12th	
1986–87	6	1ª Reg.	10th	
1987–88	6	1ª Reg.	15th	

=== Juvenil A ===
==== Superliga / Liga de Honor sub-19 ====
Seasons with two or more trophies shown in bold

: :Season: :	Level	Group	Position	Copa del Rey Juvenil	Notes
1986–87	1		11th	N/A	
1987–88	1		9th	Round of 16	
1988–89	1		12th	Round of 16	
1989–90	1		14th	Round of 16	
1990–91	2	4	3rd	N/A	
1991–92	2	4	4th	N/A	Promoted via play-off
1992–93	1		16th	N/A	
1993–94	2	5	5th	N/A	
1994–95	2	5	9th	N/A	

==== División de Honor Juvenil ====
*Season*	Level	Group	Position	Copa del Rey Juv.	Copa de Campeones	Europe/notes
1995–96	1	5	5th	N/A	N/A	—
1996–97	1	5	10th	N/A	N/A	—
1997–98	1	5	7th	N/A	N/A	—
1998–99	1	5	6th	N/A	N/A	—
1999–00	1	5	10th	N/A	N/A	—
2000–01	1	4	3rd	Quarter-final	N/A	—
2001–02	1	5	12th	N/A	N/A	—
2002–03	1	4	16th	N/A	N/A	—
2003–04	2	8	6th	N/A	N/A	—
2004–05	2	8	11th	N/A	N/A	—
2005–06	2	8	12th	N/A	N/A	—
2006–07	2	8	13th	N/A	N/A	—
2007–08	2	8	11th	N/A	N/A	—
2008–09	2	8	9th	N/A	N/A	—
2009–10	2	8	9th	N/A	N/A	—
2010–11	2	8	4th	N/A	N/A	—
2011–12	1	7	13th	N/A	N/A	N/A
2012–13	2	8	10th	N/A	N/A	N/A
2013–14	2	8	11th	N/A	N/A	N/A
2014–15	2	8	10th	N/A	N/A	N/A
2015–16	2	8	3rd	N/A	N/A	N/A
2016–17	1	VII	7th	N/A	N/A	N/A
2017–18	1	VII	12th	N/A	N/A	N/A
2018–19	1	VII	13th	N/A	N/A	N/A
2019–20 (Note: In March 2020, all fixtures were suspended due to the COVID-19 pandemic in Spain. On 6 May 2020, the Royal Spanish Football Federation announced the premature end of the leagues, revoking all relegations, declaring each divisional leader as champion and cancelling the Copa del Rey Juvenil and the Copa de Campeones for the season.)	2	8	3rd	N/A	N/A	N/A
2020–21	1	VII-A/C	5th/8th	N/A (Note: Copa del Rey Juvenil not held in 2020–21.)	N/A	N/A (Note: UEFA Youth League not held in 2020–21.)
2021–22	1	VII	16th	N/A	N/A	N/A
2022–23	2	8	4th	N/A	N/A	N/A
2023–24	1	VII	7th	N/A	N/A	N/A
2024–25	1	VII	15th	N/A	N/A	N/A
