= RCD Espanyol Cantera =

RCD Espanyol (youth system)
- Ground: Ciutat Esportiva Dani Jarque, Sant Adrià de Besòs, Catalonia, Spain
- Capacity: 1,520
- President: Chen Yansheng
- Coach: Xavi Morón
- League: División de Honor
- 2018–19: División de Honor, Gr. 3, 3rd
- Website: www.rcdespanyol.com/en/youth-team-football/
Home colours	Away colours

The cantera (quarry) of Spanish professional football club RCD Espanyol is the organisation's youth academy, developing players from childhood through to the integration of the best prospects into the adult teams.

The final category within the youth structure is the Juvenil A under-18/19 team which represents the club in national competition. The successful graduates then usually move to the club's reserve team, Espanyol B, which is also considered part of the cantera due to being a stage in progression towards the senior team, albeit competing in the adult league system.

The academy is based at the club training complex, Ciutat Esportiva Dani Jarque.

== Background ==
The top football clubs in the Spanish leagues generally place great importance in developing their cantera to promote the players from within or sell to other clubs as a source of revenue, and Espanyol is no exception. Their youth recruitment network is focused primarily around their home region of Catalonia and there are collaboration agreements in place with small clubs in the region.

A challenge for Espanyol is recruiting and retaining local talent is the presence of City rivals FC Barcelona, which has a larger international profile, greater financial resources and a broader support base. Espanyol ha also developed players through its youth system and promoted them to the first team, although many highly regarded young players in the region join Barcelona's academy.

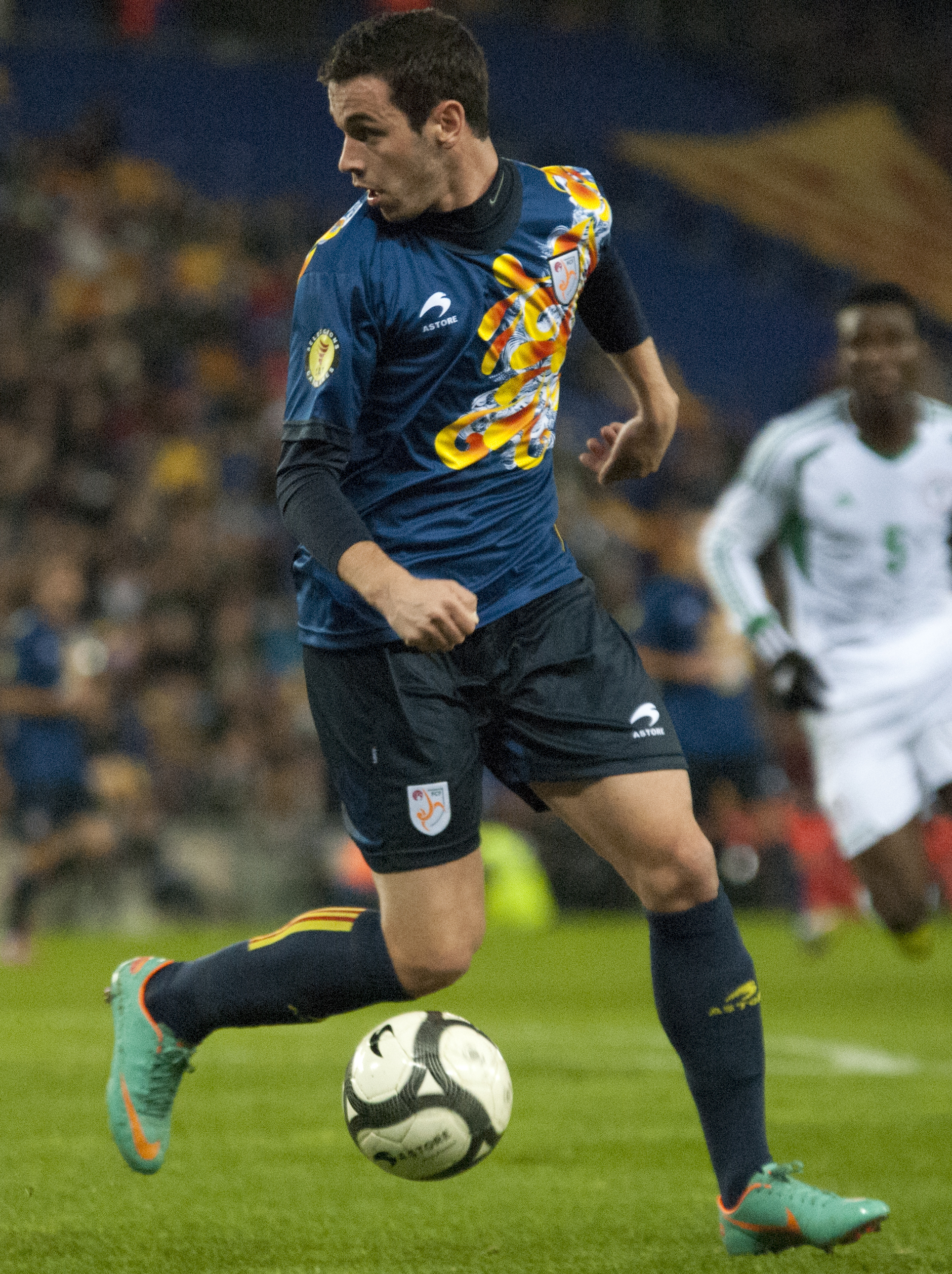
Álvaro Vázquez (pictured playing for Catalonia) is a canterano graduate who joined the club at 14 and made his first-team debut five years later

Espanyol made significant upgrades to their facilities with the 2001 opening of their Ciutat Esportiva ('sports city') and since then their results at youth level have improved significantly compared to the 20th century, with eight regional titles, five Copa de Campeones Juvenil finals and five Copa del Rey Juvenil finals between 2001-2016, compared to just one Copa del Rey final appearance in the previous 50 years, one regional title (1976-85 era) and a best finish of 4th in the nationwide Superliga (1986–94). This run of success in the 21st century was very similar to the achievements during the same period of the FC Barcelona youths, whose academy La Masia is regarded as one of the best in the world for developing great players.

The training centre is now named after the late club captain Daniel Jarque (died 2009) who was himself a graduate of the academy.

== Progression of players ==
As per analysis from the CIES Football Observatory, in 2014 Espanyol had four 'homegrown players' (as per UEFA guidelines, three years of training between 15 and 21 years old) still at their formative club, with another 17 at other top clubs across Europe - ranked 13th across all "big five" league clubs. According to the 2016 report, the figures were six players still at the club and eight elsewhere This total of 14 was far less than Barcelona (37 players produced) and also some way behind clubs of similar stature such as Real Sociedad (25 players), whose youth team record at national level is slightly poorer than Espanyol. A separate analysis by the same organisation at the end of that season showed that Espanyol's canteranos participated in 23% of the minutes in the 2016–17 La Liga, where they finished 8th. The club ranked 22nd in the table of the 98 participants in the Big Five leagues.

A further 2016 study demonstrated that although Espanyol had more players selected for the Spanish national squad at various age group levels than Athletic Bilbao (another club with a renowned academy) in the 21st century, far fewer graduated to the senior Spain side, indicating that the club's youth coaching is effective but the methods are less successful as the players move into adulthood. Although a long list of former Pericos youths have carved out decent careers in the Segunda División and in foreign leagues such as the Cypriot First Division, it would perhaps have been hoped by the club that more players of the generation would have made the transition from promising youngsters to elite professionals, given the strength of the academy teams. The system is still the envy of many clubs, with a 2012 report highlighting Espanyol's results in contrast to those of Real Zaragoza, a club of similar size who compete in the same regional leagues at youth level, working under financial limitations (this was prior to the takeover by China's Rastar Group in 2016).

== National competitions ==
The Juvenil A team play in Group III of the División de Honor Juvenil as their regular annual competition. Their main rivals in the league group are Barcelona as well as Mallorca and youth-only club CF Damm. The under-17 team, Juvenil B, plays in the Liga Nacional Juvenil which is the lower division of the same structure. The team also regularly participates in the Copa de Campeones Juvenil and the Copa del Rey Juvenil, qualification for which is dependent on final league group position. In these nationwide competitions the opposition includes the academy teams of Atlético Madrid, Sevilla, Athletic Bilbao and Real Madrid.

== International tournaments ==
It is possible for Espanyol Juvenil to participate in the UEFA Youth League, either by winning the previous season's Copa de Campeones or by way of the senior team qualifying for the UEFA Champions League group stages, but so far neither has been achieved - they came close when Villarreal prevailed in the 2015 final of the Copa Campeones after extra time.

== Structure ==
The first intake of boys from the Province of Barcelona are introduced into the Benjamí teams at around 8 years of age and advance by an age group every season through Aleví, Infantil, Cadet and Juvenil levels. Players retained after their Juvenil A spell (aged about 18) typically move to reserve team RCD Espanyol B to gain experience in an adult league (Segunda División B level in most years). They can spend up to five years with the B team, often with some loan spells at other clubs included, although the best players usually move up to the senior team within 2 seasons if considered ready to do so, with the remaining B team members augmented by the next set of youth graduates in their ongoing battle to retain their divisional status.

=== Head coaches ===
Squad	Age	Coach	Tier	League
Juvenil A	16-18	Luis Blanco	1	División de Honor (Gr. III)
Juvenil B	16-18	Xavi Morón	2	Liga Nacional (Gr. VII)
Cadete A	14-15	TBU	1	Divisió d'Honor Cadet
Cadete B	14-15	TBU	2	Preferent Cadet

== Current squad ==
=== Juvenil A ===
As of 31 January 2023

Note: Flags indicate national team as defined under FIFA eligibility rules; some limited exceptions apply. Players may hold more than one non-FIFA nationality.

No.	Pos.	Nation	Player
—	GK	ESP	Marc Marocco
—	GK	LTU	Rimvydas Kiriejevas
—	DF	CHN	Alex Yang
—	DF	ESP	Ian Fornes
—	DF	ESP	José Català
—	DF	ESP	Marc López
—	DF	ESP	Pol García
—	DF	ESP	Hugo Pascual
—	MF	ESP	Marc Delgado
—	MF	ESP	Roger Ciuró

No.	Pos.	Nation	Player
—	MF	ESP	Arnau Sans
—	MF	ESP	Adrián Barquero
—	MF	ESP	Izan Sarmiento
—	MF	ESP	Pol Cid
—	FW	ESP	Ussu
—	FW	ESP	Sergio Rivares
—	FW	ESP	Javi Hernández
—	FW	ESP	Jordi Coca
—	FW	MAR	Omar Sadik
—	FW	ESP	David Pecellín

=== Juvenil B ===
As of 31 January 2023

Note: Flags indicate national team as defined under FIFA eligibility rules; some limited exceptions apply. Players may hold more than one non-FIFA nationality.

No.	Pos.	Nation	Player
—	GK	ESP	Llorenç Serred
—	GK	ESP	Álvaro Pacheco
—	DF	ESP	Ferran Gómez
—	DF	ESP	David Santiago
—	DF	ESP	Bruno Martínez
—	DF	ESP	Xavi Rufo
—	DF	MAR	Rachid Saiah Bouchaiba
—	DF	ESP	Roger Hinojo
—	MF	ESP	Arnau Parra
—	MF	ESP	Rafa Bauza
—	MF	ESP	Bruno Portal
—	MF	ESP	Bomba

No.	Pos.	Nation	Player
—	MF	ESP	Manu Lara
—	FW	ESP	Arnau Pedrola
—	FW	ESP	Álex Partera
—	FW	ESP	Eloy Gil
—	FW	ESP	Ricard Ortega
—	FW	ESP	Jan Moreno
—	FW	ESP	Hugo Burgos
—	FW	ESP	Lluc Castell
—	FW	ESP	Adrià Alsina
—	FW	ESP	José Borrella
—	FW	ARG	Mateo Sciancalepore

== Famous players ==
Notable graduates who passed through the youth system on their way to establishing themselves with the Espanyol senior side and/or other clubs include:

As of July 2017

players currently at Espanyol in bold, 'graduation' year in parentheses

- Paco Flores (1971)
- Diego Orejuela (1979)
- Javi López (1985)
- Jordi Lardín (1992)
- Lluis Codina (1992)
- Enrique de Lucas (1996)
- Raúl Tamudo (1996)
- Alberto Lopo (1998)
- Moisés Hurtado (1999)
- Bruno (1999)
- David García (1999)
- Albert Crusat (2000)
- Daniel Jarque (2001)
- Marc Bertrán (2001)
- Jonathan Soriano (2001)
- Jordi Codina (2002)
- Carlos García (2003)
- Biel Ribas (2003)
- Javier Chica (2004)
- Sergio Sánchez (2004)
- Ángel Martínez (2005)
- Marc Torrejón (2005)
- Víctor Ruiz (2008)
- **Dídac Vilà** (2008)
- **David López** (2008)
- Álvaro Vázquez (2009)
- Jordi Amat (2009)
- Javi Márquez (2009)
- Alexandru Maxim (2009)
- Víctor Álvarez (2010)
- Cristian Tello (2010)
- Thievy (2011)
- **Sergi Darder** (2011)
- Rubén Duarte (2012)
- Eric Bailly (2013)
- Joan Jordán (2013)
- Pau López (2013)
- Marc Navarro (2014)
- **Marc Roca** (2015)
- Aarón Martín (2015)
- **Óscar Melendo** (2016)

Sergio Tejera, Gerard Moreno and Marc Cucurella spent several years with Espanyol but made their professional debuts at other clubs.

== Season to season (Juvenil A) ==
=== Superliga / Liga de Honor sub-19 ===
Seasons with two or more trophies shown in bold

: :Season: :	Level	Group	Position	Copa del Rey Juvenil	Notes
1986–87	1		6th	Round of 16	
1987–88	1		10th	Round of 16	
1988–89	1		8th	Round of 16	
1989–90	1		9th	Round of 16	
1990–91	1		11th	Quarter-final	
1991–92	1		4th	Quarter-final	
1992–93	1		9th	Round of 16	
1993–94	1		12th	Quarter-final	
1994–95	N/A		N/A	N/A	Did not enter tournaments

=== División de Honor Juvenil ===
Seasons with two or more trophies shown in bold

*Season*	Level	Group	Position	Copa del Rey Juv.	Copa de Campeones	Europe/notes
1995–96	1	3	2nd	Round of 16	N/A	—N/a
1996–97	1	3	1st	Round of 16	2nd in group of 3	—N/a
1997–98	1	3	4th	N/A	N/A	—N/a
1998–99	1	3	1st	Quarter-final	2nd in group of 3	—N/a
1999–00	1	3	3rd	Quarter-final	N/A	—N/a
2000–01	1	3	2nd	Winners	N/A	—N/a
2001–02	1	3	1st	Round of 16	Semi-final	—N/a
**2002–03**	1	3	**1st**	**Winners**	Runners-up	—N/a
**2003–04**	1	3	**1st**	**Winners**	Runners-up	—N/a
2004–05	1	3	2nd	Round of 16	N/A	—N/a
2005–06	1	3	2nd	Quarter-final	N/A	—N/a
2006–07	1	3	1st	Round of 16	2nd in group of 3	—N/a
**2007–08**	1	3	**1st**	Quarter-final	**Winners**	—N/a
2008–09	1	3	3rd	Quarter-final	N/A	—N/a
2009–10	1	3	2nd	Semi-final	N/A	—N/a
2010–11	1	3	2nd	Runners-up	N/A	—N/a
**2011–12**	1	3	**1st**	**Winners**	Runners-up	N/A
2012–13	1	3	3rd	N/A	N/A	N/A
2013–14	1	III	2nd	Quarter-final	N/A	N/A
2014–15	1	III	1st	Round of 16	Runners-up	N/A
2015–16	1	III	1st	Quarter-final	Semi-final	N/A
2016–17	1	III	3rd	N/A	N/A	N/A
2017–18	1	III	5th	N/A	N/A	N/A
2018–19	1	III	3rd	Quarter-final	N/A	N/A
2019–20 (Note: In March 2020, all fixtures were suspended due to the COVID-19 pandemic in Spain. On 6 May 2020, the Royal Spanish Football Federation announced the premature end of the leagues, revoking all relegations, declaring each divisional leader as champion and cancelling the Copa del Rey Juvenil and the Copa de Campeones for the season.)	1	III	3rd	N/A	N/A	N/A
2020–21	1	III-A/C	1st/3rd	N/A (Note: Copa del Rey Juvenil not held in 2020–21.)	N/A	N/A (Note: UEFA Youth League not held in 2020–21.)
2021–22	1	III	2nd	Runners-up	N/A	N/A
2022–23	1	III	7th	Round of 32	N/A	N/A
2023–24	1	III	2nd	Runners-up	N/A	N/A
2024–25	1	III	5th	N/A	N/A	N/A

== Honours ==
=== National competitions ===
- División de Honor Juvenil (Group III): (regional league)
  - 1 1978 (Liga Nacional Juvenil 1975-86)
  - 10 1997, 1999, 2002, 2003, 2004, 2007, 2008, 2012, 2015, 2016 (current format since 1995)
- Copa de Campeones Juvenil:
  - 1-time winners: 2008 (current format since 1995)
  - 4 times runners-up: 2003, 2004, 2012, 2015
- Copa del Rey Juvenil: (since 1951)
  - 4 times winners: 2001, 2003, 2004, 2012
  - 4 times runners-up: 1954, 2011, 2022, 2024
