= Danok Bat CF =

Danok Bat
- Full name: Danok Bat Club de Fica
- Founded: 1972; 54 years ago
- Ground: Mallona, Bilbao, Basque Country
- President: Gotxon Astoreka
- League: División de Honor
- 2018–19: División de Honor, Gr. 2, 5th
- Website: http://danokbat.com/
Home colours

Danok Bat Club de Fica is a Spanish football team based in Bilbao, in the autonomous community of Basque Country. Founded in 1972, the club is mainly known for their successful youth setup, which helps players to develop and join other senior clubs in the region.

Their Juvenil A squad play in the Group II of the División de Honor Juvenil de Fútbol. The opponents in the league group include other clubs whose adult departments compete at various levels from La Liga down to Tercera División, another strong youth-only organisation, Antiguoko, and the academy teams of Real Sociedad, Osasuna and Athletic Bilbao, who have a fruitful collaborative agreement with Danok Bat.

The Juvenil B team plays in the Liga Nacional Juvenil de Fútbol, which is the lower division of the same structure, and the Juvenil C team participates in the Liga Vasca one tier further down – as with adult leagues, the different teams cannot coincide at the same level.

== Season to season (Juvenil A) ==
=== División de Honor Juvenil ===
Seasons with two or more trophies shown in bold

*Season*	Level	Group	Position	Copa del Rey Juv.	Copa Campeones	Europe/notes
1995–96	1	2	9th	N/A	N/A	---
1996–97	1	2	6th	N/A	N/A	---
1997–98	1	2	5th	N/A	N/A	---
1998–99	1	2	6th	N/A	N/A	---
1999–00	1	2	5th	N/A	N/A	---
2000–01	1	2	11th	N/A	N/A	---
2001–02	1	2	8th	N/A	N/A	---
2002–03	1	2	11th	N/A	N/A	---
2003–04	1	2	9th	N/A	N/A	---
2004–05	1	2	10th	N/A	N/A	---
2005–06	1	2	8th	N/A	N/A	---
2006–07	1	2	3rd	Round of 16	N/A	---
2007–08	1	2	6th	N/A	N/A	---
2008–09	1	2	4th	N/A	N/A	---
2009–10	1	2	5th	N/A	N/A	---
2010–11	1	2	8th	N/A	N/A	---
2011–12	1	2	2nd	Round of 16	N/A	N/A
2012–13	1	2	10th	N/A	N/A	N/A
2013–14	1	II	3rd	Round of 16	N/A	N/A
2014–15	1	II	4th	N/A	N/A	N/A
2015–16	1	II	3rd	N/A	N/A	N/A
2016–17	1	II	7th	N/A	N/A	N/A
2017–18	1	II	5th	N/A	N/A	N/A
2018–19	1	II	5th	N/A	N/A	N/A
2019–20 (Note: In March 2020, all fixtures were suspended due to the COVID-19 pandemic in Spain. On 6 May 2020, the Royal Spanish Football Federation announced the premature end of the leagues, revoking all relegations, declaring each divisional leader as champion and cancelling the Copa del Rey Juvenil and the Copa de Campeones for the season.)	1	II	6th	N/A	N/A	N/A
2020–21	1	II-B/C	5th/7th	N/A (Note: Copa del Rey Juvenil not held in 2020–21.)	N/A	N/A (Note: UEFA Youth League not held in 2020–21.)
2021–22	1	II	10th	N/A	N/A	N/A
2022–23	1	II	13th	N/A	N/A	N/A
2023–24	2	4	1st	N/A	N/A	N/A
2024–25	1	II	7th	Round of 32	N/A	N/A

== Famous players ==
Note: List consists of players who appeared in La Liga or reached international status.

- (Spain) Igor Angulo
- (Spain) Bolo
- (Spain) Iñigo Barrenetxea
- (Spain) Ander Capa
- (Spain) Mikel Dañobeitia
- (Spain) Unai Expósito
- (Spain) Iñaki Goitia
- (Spain) Ibón Gutiérrez
- (Spain) Iago Herrerín
- (Spain) Iñigo Lekue
- (Spain) Andoni López
- (Spain) Sabin Merino
- (Spain) Yeray Álvarez
