= Sporting de Gijón (youth) =

- Full name: Real Sporting de Gijón, SAD
- Ground: Escuela de Fútbol de Mareo, Gijón, Asturias, Spain
- Capacity: 1,500
- Chairman: Javier Fernández
- League: División de Honor
- 2018–19: Group 1, 2nd
- Website: http://www.realsporting.com
Home colours	Away colours

The Sporting de Gijón youth teams are integrated in the club's youth academy, developing players from childhood through to the integration of the best prospects into the adult teams.

The final category within the youth structure is the Juvenil A under-18/19 team which represents the club in the top national competition. The successful graduates then usually move to the club's reserve team, Sporting de Gijón B which is also considered part of the cantera due to being a stage in progression towards the senior team, albeit competing in the adult league system.

The academy is based at the club training complex, Escuela de Fútbol de Mareo, which is often the name used informally to refer to the system itself.

== Background ==
The top football clubs in the Spanish leagues generally place great importance in developing their cantera to promote the players from within or sell to other clubs as a source of revenue, and Sporting de Gijón is no exception. Their youth recruitment network is focused around their home region of Asturias, and there are collaboration agreements in place with small clubs in the region.

Sporting de Gijón had many farm teams, like RD Oriamendi, until his official reserve team, Sporting de Gijón B, was established in 1960.

Sporting's academy, the Escuela de Fútbol de Mareo, built in 1974, is considered one of the most important football academies in Spain. International players such as Luis Enrique, Abelardo, Javier Manjarín and David Villa learned their skills at Mareo.

In 2010, Sporting youth graduate Míchel was sold to Birmingham City for £3 million, becoming the highest transfers in the history of the Asturian club, until the transfers of José Ángel to Roma, in 2011, by €4.5 million, and Jorge Meré to Köln, in 2017, for a fee between €8.5 million and €9 million.

== Structure ==
=== Head coaches ===
The coaches are often former Sporting Gijón players who themselves graduated from Mareo.

Squad	Age	Coach	Tier	League
Juvenil A	16-18	Ismael Piñera	1	División de Honor (Gr. I)
Juvenil B	16-17	Sergio Sánchez	2	Liga Nacional (Gr. II)
Cadete A	15-16	Alejandro Morán	1	Primera Cadete
Cadete B	14-15	Diego Galeano	2	Segunda Cadete

== Current squads ==
=== Juvenil A ===
As of March 2017

Note: Flags indicate national team as defined under FIFA eligibility rules; some limited exceptions apply. Players may hold more than one non-FIFA nationality.

No.	Pos.	Nation	Player
—	GK	ESP	Damián García
—	GK	ESP	Enol Muñiz
—	GK	ESP	Jonathan Sánchez
—	DF	ESP	Pelayo Suárez
—	DF	ESP	Ismael Azpiri
—	DF	ESP	Néstor Bustelo
—	DF	ESP	Rubén Expósito
—	DF	ESP	Alberto
—	DF	ESP	Miguel Prado
—	DF	ESP	Varo
—	DF	ESP	Alberto Espeso
—	MF	ESP	Pablo García
—	MF	ESP	Gaspar Campos
—	MF	ESP	Pablo Ferreiro

No.	Pos.	Nation	Player
—	MF	ESP	Diego Díaz
—	MF	ESP	Nacho
—	MF	ESP	Iván Elena
—	MF	ESP	Mateo Arellano
—	MF	ESP	Rehber
—	MF	ESP	Jaime Izquierdo
—	MF	ESP	Yoel Palacio
—	FW	ESP	Daniel Sandoval
—	FW	PAR	Joel Sanabria
—	FW	ESP	David Ruiz
—	FW	ESP	Mario Buelga
—	FW	ESP	Bertín

== Season to season (Juvenil A) ==
Season	Lvl	Grp	Pos	Copa de Campeones	Copa del Rey
1992–93	DH	1	1st		First round
1993–94	DH	1	1st		First round
1994–95	Liga de Honor		5th		First round
1995–96	DH	1	3rd		Round of 16
1996–97	DH	1	2nd		Semifinals
1997–98	DH	1	7th		
1998–99	DH	1	6th		
1999–00	DH	1	2nd		Round of 16
2000–01	DH	1	6th		
2001–02	DH	1	6th		
2002–03	DH	1	8th		
2003–04	DH	1	1st	Champion	Round of 16
2004–05	DH	1	1st	Runner-up	Runner-up
2005–06	DH	1	5th		
2006–07	DH	1	4th		
2007–08	DH	1	8th		
2008–09	DH	1	3rd		
2009–10	DH	1	3rd		
2010–11	DH	1	4th		
2011–12	DH	1	1st	Semifinals	Round of 16
2012–13	DH	1	2nd		Round of 16
2013–14	DH	1	5th		
2014–15	DH	1	6th		
2015–16	DH	1	3rd		Quarterfinals
2016–17	DH	1	2nd		Round of 16
2017–18	DH	1	1st	Runner-up	Round of 16
2018–19	DH	1	2nd		Round of 16
2019–20 (Note: In March 2020, all fixtures were suspended due to the COVID-19 pandemic in Spain. On 6 May 2020, the Royal Spanish Football Federation announced the premature end of the leagues, revoking all relegations, declaring each divisional leader as champion and cancelling the Copa del Rey Juvenil and the Copa de Campeones for the season.)	DH	1	2nd		—
2020–21	DH	1-B/C	1st/3rd		—
2021–22	DH	1	6th		
2022–23	DH	1	3rd		Quarterfinals
2023–24	DH	1	6th		
2024–25	DH	1	3rd		Round of 32

== Honours ==
=== National competitions ===
- División de Honor (Group I): (first-tier inter-regional league)
  - 4 2003–04, 2004–05, 2011–12, 2017–18
- Copa de Campeones:
  - 1 2004 (runners-up: 2005, 2018)
- Copa del Rey:
  - 0 (runners-up: 2005)
