= Antiguoko =

- Full name: Antiguoko Kirol Elkartea
- Founded: 1982
- Stadium: Campo de Berio
- President: Edorta Salegi
- League: División de Honor
- 2018–19: División de Honor, Gr. 2, 8th
- Website: antiguoko.eus
Home colours

Antiguoko Kirol Elkartea (Sport Club of Antiguo in English) is an amateur youth Spanish football club based in Antiguo, a part of San Sebastián, in the Basque Country, Spain.

It acts as feeder club to Athletic Bilbao, previously having the same agreement with Real Sociedad.

== Club overview ==
Antiguoko was founded in 1982; at that time the team did not even possess its own ground.

A number of famous players who appeared for Real Sociedad as well as other teams – and the Spanish national side – have graduated from the club, including Xabi Alonso, Mikel Arteta, Javier de Pedro, Martín Zubimendi and Yuri Berchiche. Sell-on fees from multi-million transfers involving Alonso and Arteta have provided funds for Antiguoko to improve their facilities.

Aritz Aduriz, Andoni Iraola and Ander Murillo were also youth products of Antiguoko, and later appeared professionally with Real Sociedad's Basque neighbours Athletic Bilbao, a club that had a formal agreement with Antiguoko for several seasons and continues to acquire its players on a regular basis.

The Juvenil A squad plays in the Group II of the División de Honor Juvenil de Fútbol. The opponents in the league group include the academy teams of Athletic Bilbao, Real Sociedad and Osasuna, other clubs whose adult departments compete at various levels from La Liga down to Tercera División, and another strong youth-only organisation, Danok Bat. The Juvenil B team plays in the Liga Nacional Juvenil de Fútbol which is the lower division of the same structure, and the Juvenil C team participates in the Liga Vasca one tier further down - as with adult leagues, the different teams cannot coincide at the same level.

Antiguoko finished top of the league in 2006–07 which gave them a rare chance to compete nationally in the Copa de Campeones Juvenil and the Copa del Rey Juvenil.

== Season to season (Juvenil A) ==
=== División de Honor Juvenil ===
Seasons with two or more trophies shown in bold

*Season*	Level	Group	Position	Copa del Rey Juv.	Copa Campeones	Europe/notes
1995–96	3	4	7th	N/A	N/A	---
1996–97	3	4	2nd	N/A	N/A	---
1997–98	2	4	4th	N/A	N/A	---
1998–99	1	2	3rd	Semi-final	N/A	---
1999–00	1	2	13th	N/A	N/A	---
2000–01	2	4	3rd	N/A	N/A	---
2001–02	1	2	13th	N/A	N/A	---
2002–03	2	4	2nd	N/A	N/A	---
2003–04	1	2	8th	N/A	N/A	---
2004–05	1	2	3rd	Round of 16	N/A	---
2005–06	1	2	10th	N/A	N/A	---
2006–07	1	2	1st	Round of 16	3rd in group of 3	---
2007–08	1	2	11th	N/A	N/A	---
2008–09	1	2	6th	N/A	N/A	---
2009–10	1	2	10th	N/A	N/A	---
2010–11	1	2	15th	N/A	N/A	---
2011–12	2	4	1st	N/A	N/A	N/A
2012–13	1	2	5th	N/A	N/A	N/A
2013–14	1	II	10th	N/A	N/A	N/A
2014–15	1	II	5th	N/A	N/A	N/A
2015–16	1	II	2nd	Round of 16	N/A	N/A
2016–17	1	II	12th	N/A	N/A	N/A
2017–18	1	II	8th	N/A	N/A	N/A
2018–19	1	II	8th	N/A	N/A	N/A
2019–20 (Note: In March 2020, all fixtures were suspended due to the COVID-19 pandemic in Spain. On 6 May 2020, the Royal Spanish Football Federation announced the premature end of the leagues, revoking all relegations, declaring each divisional leader as champion and cancelling the Copa del Rey Juvenil and the Copa de Campeones for the season.)	1	II	10th	N/A	N/A	N/A
2020–21	1	II-B/R	7th/4th	N/A (Note: Copa del Rey Juvenil not held in 2020–21.)	N/A	N/A (Note: UEFA Youth League not held in 2020–21.)
2021–22	1	II	6th	N/A	N/A	N/A
2022–23	1	II	6th	Round of 16	N/A	N/A
2023–24	1	II	4th	Round of 32	N/A	N/A
2024–25	1	II	9th	N/A	N/A	N/A

== See also ==
- Category:Antiguoko players
