= FC Barcelona (youth) =

FC Barcelona's under-19 football team

Barcelona Juvenil
- Full name: Futbol Club Barcelona Juvenil
- Nickname: La Masia
- Founded: 20 October 1979; 47 years ago
- Stadium: Ciutat Esportiva Joan Gamper
- Capacity: 6,000
- President: Joan Laporta
- Head coach: Albert Peris
- League: División de Honor Juvenil de Fútbol
- 2023–24: División de Honor Group 3, 3rd
- Website: fcbarcelona.com/juvenil-a
Home colours	Away colours	Third colours

Futbol Club Barcelona Juvenil are the under-19 team of Spanish professional football club Barcelona and the final stage of progression in the club's youth academy commonly referred to as La Masia. The Juvenil team play in the Group III of the División de Honor Juvenil de Fútbol where their main rivals are Damm, Espanyol, and Mallorca.

They also participate in the national Copa de Campeones Juvenil and the Copa del Rey Juvenil, qualification for which is dependent on final league group position. The team has also taken part in the continental UEFA Youth League; they won in 2014, 2018 and 2025

== Juvenil A ==
=== Current squad ===
As of 6 October 2026

Note: Flags indicate national team as defined under FIFA eligibility rules; some limited exceptions apply. Players may hold more than one non-FIFA nationality.

No.	Pos.	Nation	Player
—	GK	ESP	Max Bonfill
—	GK	ESP	Iker Rodríguez
—	DF	ESP	Alex Campos
—	DF	ARG	Nico Marcipar
—	DF	ESP	Baba Kourouma
—	DF	GHA	Hafiz Gariba
—	DF	ESP	Lorenzo Oertli
—	DF	ESP	Pol Bernabéu
—	DF	ESP	Guillem Víctor
—	DF	ESP	Nil Teixidor
—	MF	ESP	Dani Ávila
—	MF	ESP	Pedro Villar
—	MF	ESP	Pedro Rodriguez
—	MF	ESP	Nil Vicens

No.	Pos.	Nation	Player
—	MF	ISR	Orian Goren
—	MF	ESP	Roberto Tomás
—	MF	ESP	Ebrima Tunkara
—	MF	CRO	Lovro Chelfi
—	FW	NED	Shane Kluivert
—	FW	ESP	Pau Cifuentes
—	FW	ESP	Oriol Pallàs
—	FW	ESP	Adrià Muñoz
—	FW	ESP	Sama Nomoko
—	FW	ESP	Adrián Guerrero
—	FW	ESP	Nuhu Fofana
—	FW	ENG	Ajay Tavares
—	FW	EGY	Hamza Abdelkarim

=== Season to season (Juvenil A) ===
Seasons with two or more trophies shown in bold

==== Superliga / Liga de Honor sub-19 ====
: :Season: :	Level	Group	Position	Copa del Rey Juvenil	Notes
1986–87	1		2nd	Winners	
1987–88	1		2nd	Runners-up	
1988–89	1		6th	Winners	
1989–90	1		3rd	Runners-up	
1990–91	1		2nd	Runners-up	
1991–92	1		3rd	Round of 16	
1992–93	1		3rd	Runners-up	
**1993–94**	1		**1st**	**Winners**	
1994–95	1		2nd	Semi-final	

==== División de Honor Juvenil ====
Season	Level	Group	Position	Copa del Rey Juv.	Copa de Campeones	UEFA Youth League	Intercontinental Cup
1995–96	1	3	3rd	Winners	N/A	—N/a	—N/a
1996–97	1	3	2nd	Runners-up	N/A	—N/a	—N/a
1997–98	1	3	2nd	Round of 16	N/A	—N/a	—N/a
1998–99	1	3	2nd	Semi-final	N/A	—N/a	—N/a
**1999–00**	1	3	**1st**	**Winners**	Runners-up	—N/a	—N/a
2000–01	1	3	1st	Round of 16	3rd in group of 3	—N/a	—N/a
2001–02	1	3	3rd	Winners	N/A	—N/a	—N/a
2002–03	1	3	6th	N/A	N/A	—N/a	—N/a
2003–04	1	3	3rd	Quarter-final	N/A	—N/a	—N/a
**2004–05**	1	3	**1st**	**Winners**	**Winners**	—N/a	—N/a
**2005-06**	1	3	**1st**	**Winners**	3rd in group of 3	—N/a	—N/a
2006–07	1	3	2nd	Round of 16	N/A	—N/a	—N/a
2007-08	1	7	2nd	Runners-up	N/A	—N/a	—N/a
2008-09	1	3	**1st**	Semi-final	**Winners**	—N/a	—N/a
2009–10	1	3	1st	Round of 16	Quarter-final	—N/a	—N/a
**2010–11**	1	3	**1st**	**Winners**	**Winners**	—N/a	—N/a
2011–12	1	3	2nd	Semi-final	Quarter-final	1st in group, Quarter-final	—N/a
2012–13	1	3	1st	Quarter-final	Quarter-final	1st in group, Round of 16	—N/a
**2013–14**	1	III	**1st**	Semi-final	Quarter-final	1st in group, **Winners**	—N/a
2014–15	1	III	5th	N/A	N/A	2nd in group, Round of 16	—N/a
2015–16	1	III	4th	N/A	N/A	1st in group, Quarter-final	—N/a
2016–17	1	III	1st	Quarter-final	Quarter-final	1st in group, Semi-final	—N/a
**2017–18**	1	III	**1st**	Quarter-final	Semi-final	1st in group, **Winners**	—N/a
2018–19	1	III	2nd	Quarter-final	N/A	1st in group, Semi-final	—N/a
2019–20 (Note: In March 2020, all fixtures were suspended due to the COVID-19 pandemic in Spain. On 6 May 2020, the Royal Spanish Football Federation announced the premature end of the leagues, revoking all relegations, declaring each divisional leader as champion and cancelling the Copa del Rey Juvenil and the Copa de Campeones for the season.)	1	III	1st	N/A	N/A	4th in group	—N/a
2020–21	1	III-A/C	2nd/1st	N/A (Note: Copa del Rey Juvenil not held in 2020–21.)	Runners-up	N/A (Note: UEFA Youth League not held in 2020–21.)	—N/a
**2021–22**	1	III	**1st**	Round of 32	**Winners**	3rd in group	N/A
2022–23	1	III	1st	Round of 16	Quarter-final	1st in group, Round of 16	N/A
2023–24	1	III	3rd	Round of 16	N/A	2nd in group, Play-off round	N/A
**2024–25**	1	III	**1st**	**Winners**	Quarter-final	4th in league phase, **Winners**	N/A
2025–26	1	III				,	

=== Honours ===
Domestic competitions

- Liga Nacional / Superliga / Liga de Honor sub-19: 9
  - 1978, 1979, 1980, 1981, 1982, 1983, 1985, 1986, 1994
- Copa de Campeones: 4
  - 2005, 2009, 2011, 2022
- División de Honor (regional): 16
  - 2000, 2001, 2005, 2006, 2009, 2010, 2011, 2013, 2014, 2017, 2018, 2020, 2021, 2022, 2023, 2025
- Copa del Rey: 19 **(Record)**
  - 1951, 1959, 1973, 1974, 1975, 1976, 1977, 1980, 1986, 1987, 1989, 1994, 1996, 2000, 2002, 2005, 2006, 2011, 2025

European competitions

- UEFA Youth League: 3 **(Record)**
  - 2014, 2018, 2025
- Blue Stars/FIFA Youth Cup: 3
  - 1993, 1994, 1995

== Juvenil B ==
Barcelona Juvenil B
- Full name: Futbol Club Barcelona Juvenil B
- Nicknames: Barça; Azulgrana; Blaugrana
- Ground: Ciutat Esportiva
- Capacity: 6,000
- President: Joan Laporta
- Head coach: Cesc Bosch
Home colours	Away colours

=== Current squad ===
As of 16 September 2025

Note: Flags indicate national team as defined under FIFA eligibility rules; some limited exceptions apply. Players may hold more than one non-FIFA nationality.

No.	Pos.	Nation	Player
—	GK	ESP	Gerard Sala
—	GK	ESP	Gerard Valls
—	GK	ESP	Pau Espi
—	DF	ESP	Madou Murcia
—	DF	ESP	Joan Inglés
—	DF	ESP	Sergi Mayans
—	DF	ECU	Adrián Cuadrado
—	DF	ESP	Jordi Pesquer
—	DF	ESP	Pau Bergés
—	DF	ESP	Raúl Expósito
—	DF	ESP	Álvaro Gómez
—	MF	ESP	Gerard Mullol

No.	Pos.	Nation	Player
—	MF	ESP	Adam Argemí
—	MF	ESP	Michał Żuk
—	MF	AZE	Ibrahim Babayev
—	MF	ESP	Gorka Buil
—	MF	ESP	Xavi Miràngels
—	FW	ESP	Ïu Martínez
—	FW	ESP	Alejandro Pastor
—	FW	ESP	Byron Mendoza
—	FW	GAM	Alieu Drammeh
—	FW	MAR	Ismael Ziani
—	FW	ESP	Genís Clua

== Current technical staff ==
Position	Staff
Juvenil A (U19 A) Head coach	(Spain) Albert Peris
Juvenil A (U19 A) Assistant coach	(Spain) Joan Pons
Juvenil A (U19 A) Goalkeeping coach	(Spain) Jesús Unzué
Juvenil A (U19 A) Fitness coach	(Spain) Gerard Merino
Juvenil B (U19 B) Head coach	(Spain) Cesc Bosch
Juvenil B (U19 B) Assistant coach	(Spain) Adrià Monràs
Juvenil B (U19 B) Goalkeeping coach	(Spain) Ferran Montijano
Juvenil B (U19 B) Fitness coach	(Spain) Xavi Franquesa

Last updated: 16 September 2025
Source: FC Barcelona U19 A

== See also ==
- FC Barcelona B – FC Barcelona's reserve football team
- FC Barcelona C – FC Barcelona's defunct reserve football team
- La Masia – FC Barcelona's youth academy
