= Villarreal CF (youth) =

Villarreal Juvenil
- Full name: Villarreal Club de Fútbol Juvenil
- Nicknames: El Submarino Amarillo (Yellow Submarine)
- Ground: Ciudad Deportiva, Villarreal, Valencia, Spain
- Capacity: 1,500
- Chairman: Fernando Roig
- Coach: Javier Calleja
- League: División de Honor
- 2018–19: División de Honor, Gr. 7, 1st
- Website: villarrealcf.es/juvenil-a
Home colours	Away colours	Third colours

Villarreal Club de Futbol Juvenil are the under-19 team of Spanish professional football club Villarreal. They play in the Group VII of the División de Honor Juvenil de Fútbol where their main rivals are Valencia and Levante.

They also participate in the national Copa de Campeones Juvenil and the Copa del Rey Juvenil, qualification for which is dependent on final league group position, and have taken part in the continental UEFA Youth League.

== Juvenil A ==
=== Current squad ===
As of 24 May 2026

Note: Flags indicate national team as defined under FIFA eligibility rules; some limited exceptions apply. Players may hold more than one non-FIFA nationality.

No.	Pos.	Nation	Player
1	GK	ESP	Pablo Polo
2	DF	ESP	T. Bou
3	DF	ESP	Max Petersson
4	DF	ESP	Marc Pla
5	DF	ESP	G. Anadón
7	FW	ESP	W. Babacar
8	FW	ESP	S. Barrera
9	MF	MLI	B. Cissoko
10	MF	ESP	Manuel Portela
11	FW	ESP	Seydou Llopis
12	DF	ESP	A. Vidal
13	GK	ROU	E. Ursu

No.	Pos.	Nation	Player
14	MF	ESP	Marc Pérez
15	DF	SEN	M. Diallo
16	FW	ESP	M. Roca
17	DF	ESP	P. Pereda
18	FW	ESP	J. Arjona
19	FW	ESP	J. Berjillos
20	DF	ESP	Bilal
21	DF	ESP	Iker Abad
22	MF	ESP	Á. Valls
23	MF	ESP	T. Albiol
24	MF	EQG	R. Owono

== Season to season (Juvenil A) ==
=== División de Honor Juvenil de Fútbol ===
Seasons with two or more trophies shown in bold

*Season*	Level	Group	Position	Copa del Rey Juv.	Copa de Campeones	Europe/notes
1995–96	2	8	2nd	N/A	N/A	—N/a
1996–97	1	3	6th	N/A	N/A	—N/a
1997–98	1	3	6th	N/A	N/A	—N/a
1998–99	1	3	16th	N/A	N/A	—N/a
1999–00	2	8	3rd	N/A	N/A	—N/a
2000–01	1	3	5th	N/A	N/A	—N/a
2001–02	1	3	7th	N/A	N/A	—N/a
2002–03	1	3	5th	N/A	N/A	—N/a
2003–04	1	3	4th	N/A	N/A	—N/a
2004–05	1	3	4th	N/A	N/A	—N/a
2005–06	1	3	4th	N/A	N/A	—N/a
2006–07	1	7	3rd	N/A	N/A	—N/a
2007–08	1	7	1st	Round of 16	Runners-up	—N/a
2008–09	1	7	1st	Round of 16	Quarter-final	—N/a
2009–10	1	7	3rd	N/A	N/A	—N/a
2010–11	1	7	1st	Quarter-final	Quarter-final	—N/a
2011–12	1	7	3rd	N/A	N/A	N/A
2012–13	1	7	1st	Quarter-final	Semi-final	N/A
2013–14	1	VII	3rd	N/A	N/A	N/A
**2014–15**	1	VII	**1st**	Quarter-final	**Winners**	N/A
2015–16	1	VII	1st	Semi-final	Quarter-final	First Round
2016–17	1	VII	1st	Semi-final	Semi-final	N/A
2017–18	1	VII	3rd	N/A	N/A	N/A
**2018–19**	1	VII	**1st**	**Winners**	Runners-up	N/A
2019–20 (Note: In March 2020, all fixtures were suspended due to the COVID-19 pandemic in Spain. On 6 May 2020, the Royal Spanish Football Federation announced the premature end of the leagues, revoking all relegations, declaring each divisional leader as champion and cancelling the Copa del Rey Juvenil and the Copa de Campeones for the season.)	1	VII	1st	N/A	N/A	N/A
2020–21	1	VII-B/C	1st/3rd	N/A (Note: Copa del Rey Juvenil not held in 2020–21.)	N/A	N/A (Note: UEFA Youth League not held in 2020–21.)
2021–22	1	VII	3rd	Round of 32	N/A	2nd in group, Playoff round
2022–23	1	VII	3rd	Round of 32	N/A	N/A
2023–24	1	VII	3rd	Round of 32	N/A	N/A
2024–25	1	VII	4th	Round of 16	N/A	N/A

== Honours ==
National competitions

- División de Honor (Gr. 7) (9): 2007–08, 2008–09, 2010–11, 2011–12, 2012–13, 2014–15, 2015–16, 2018–19, 2019–20
- Copa de Campeones (1): 2015 (runners-up: 2008, 2019)
- Copa del Rey Juvenil (1): 2019

== See also ==
- Villarreal CF B
- Villarreal CF C
