= Real Madrid CF (youth) =

Spanish youth football team

Real Madrid Academy
- Full name: Real Madrid Club de Fútbol Academy
- Nickname: La Fábrica
- Founded: 6 March 1902
- Ground: Ciudad Real Madrid
- Capacity: 3,000; 800 with provisional stands in the goals
- President: Florentino Pérez
- Coach: Álvaro López
- League: División de Honor
- 2024–25: División de Honor – Group 5, 1st
- Website: www.realmadrid.com/futbol/cantera/juvenil-a
| Home colours | Away colours |

Real Madrid Juvenil are the under-19 team of Spanish professional football club Real Madrid. They play in the Group V of the División de Honor Juvenil de Fútbol where their main rivals are Atlético Madrid and Rayo Vallecano.

They also participate in the national Copa de Campeones Juvenil and the Copa del Rey Juvenil, qualification for which is dependent on final league group position, and have taken part in the continental UEFA Youth League, winning the competition in 2020 and 2026.

| Squad | Age | Coach | Tier | League |
|---|---|---|---|---|
| Juvenil A | 17–19 | Álvaro López | 1 | División de Honor (Gr. 5) |
| Juvenil B | 16–18 | Alfonso Berenguer | 2 | Liga Nacional (Gr. 12) |
| Juvenil C | 15–17 | Santiago Palacios | 3 | Primera División Autonómica (Gr. 1) |

== Juvenil A ==
=== Current squad ===
As of September 2026

Note: Flags indicate national team as defined under FIFA eligibility rules; some limited exceptions apply. Players may hold more than one non-FIFA nationality.

| No. | Pos. | Nation | Player |
|---|---|---|---|
| – | GK | ESP | Guille Ponce |
| – | GK | ESP | Álvaro Rodríguez |
| – | DF | ESP | Javi Bailón |
| – | DF | ESP | Álvaro Lezcano |
| – | DF | ESP | Guille González |
| – | DF | ESP | Ares Căpățână |
| – | DF | ESP | Luis Paulo |
| – | DF | ESP | Mateo Garrido |
| – | DF | FRA | Leo Lemaitre |
| – | DF | ESP | José Luis Espinosa |
| – | DF | USA | Manu Romero |
| – | DF | ESP | Mauro Bautista |

| No. | Pos. | Nation | Player |
|---|---|---|---|
| – | MF | ESP | Adrián Pérez |
| – | MF | ESP | Diego Lacosta |
| – | MF | ESP | Cherif Fofana |
| – | MF | ESP | Marco Company |
| – | MF | ESP | Andrés Córcoba |
| – | MF | ESP | Rubén López |
| – | MF | ESP | Pelayo Cidón |
| – | MF | ESP | Rodrigo Velasco |
| – | MF | ESP | Sergio Castellón |
| – | FW | ESP | Enzo Alves |
| – | FW | ESP | Yeremaiah Ramos |
| – | FW | ESP | Fran Santamaría |

=== Season by season (Juvenil A) ===
==== Superliga / Liga de Honor sub-19 ====
Seasons with two or more trophies shown in bold

| Season | Level | Group | Position | Copa del Rey Juvenil | Notes |
|---|---|---|---|---|---|
| 1986–87 | 1 | | 1st | Semi-finals | |
| **1987–88** | 1 | | **1st** | **Winners** | |
| 1988–89 | 1 | | 3rd | Round of 16 | |
| 1989–90 | 1 | | 1st | Semi-finals | |
| 1990–91 | 1 | | 3rd | Winners | |
| 1991–92 | 1 | | 2nd | Round of 16 | |
| **1992–93** | 1 | | **1st** | **Winners** | |
| 1993–94 | 1 | | 3rd | Runners-up | |
| 1994–95 | N/A | | N/A | N/A | Did not enter tournaments |

==== División de Honor Juvenil ====
Seasons with two or more trophies shown in bold

| Season | Level | Group | Position | Copa del Rey Juv. | Copa de Campeones | UEFA Youth League |
|---|---|---|---|---|---|---|
| 1995–96 | 1 | 5 | 1st | Runners-up | Runners-up | —N/a |
| **1996–97** | 1 | 5 | **1st** | Quarter-finals | **Winners** | —N/a |
| 1997–98 | 1 | 5 | 1st | Quarter-finals | 2nd in group of 3 | —N/a |
| 1998–99 | 1 | 5 | 3rd | Runners-up | N/A | —N/a |
| **1999–2000** | 1 | 5 | **1st** | Quarter-finals | **Winners** | —N/a |
| 2000–01 | 1 | 5 | 2nd | Runners-up | N/A | —N/a |
| 2001–02 | 1 | 5 | 2nd | Quarter-finals | N/A | —N/a |
| 2002–03 | 1 | 5 | 5th | N/A | N/A | —N/a |
| 2003–04 | 1 | 5 | 1st | Semi-finals | 2nd in group of 3 | —N/a |
| 2004–05 | 1 | 5 | 4th | N/A | N/A | —N/a |
| **2005–06** | 1 | 5 | **1st** | Semi-finals | **Winners** | —N/a |
| 2006–07 | 1 | 5 | 1st | Round of 16 | Runners-up | —N/a |
| 2007–08 | 1 | 5 | 2nd | Round of 16 | N/A | —N/a |
| 2008–09 | 1 | 5 | 2nd | Round of 16 | N/A | —N/a |
| **2009–10** | 1 | 5 | **1st** | Runners-up | **Winners** | —N/a |
| 2010–11 | 1 | 5 | 1st | Quarter-finals | Runners-up | —N/a |
| 2011–12 | 1 | 5 | 3rd | Round of 16 | N/A | —N/a |
| **2012–13** | 1 | 5 | **1st** | **Winners** | Quarter-finals | —N/a |
| **2013–14** | 1 | V | **1st** | Runners-up | **Winners** | 1st in group, Semi-finals |
| 2014–15 | 1 | V | 2nd | Runners-up | Semi-finals | 1st in group, Round of 16 |
| 2015–16 | 1 | V | 3rd | Runners-up | N/A | 2nd in group, Semi-finals |
| **2016–17** | 1 | V | **1st** | **Winners** | **Winners** | 1st in group, Semi-finals |
| 2017–18 | 1 | V | 3rd | Runners-up | N/A | 2nd in group, Semi-finals |
| 2018–19 | 1 | V | 2nd | Semi-finals | Quarter-finals | 1st in group, Quarter-finals |
| **2019–20** (Note: In March 2020, all fixtures were suspended due to the COVID-19 pandemic in Spain. On 6 May 2020, the Royal Spanish Football Federation announced the premature end of the non-professional leagues, revoking all relegations, declaring each divisional leader as champion and cancelling the Copa del Rey Juvenil and the Copa de Campeones for that season.) | 1 | V | **1st** | N/A | N/A | **1st in group, Winners** |
| 2020–21 | 1 | V-A/C | 1st/2nd | N/A (Note: Copa del Rey Juvenil not held in 2020–21.) | Semi-finals | N/A (Note: UEFA Youth League not held in 2020–21.) |
| 2021–22 | 1 | V | 2nd | Winners | N/A | 1st in group, Round of 16 |
| **2022–23** | 1 | V | **1st** | **Winners** | **Winners** | 1st in group, Quarter-finals |
| 2023–24 | 1 | V | 2nd | Round of 16 | N/A | 1st in group, Quarter-finals |
| 2024–25 | 1 | V | 1st | Round of 16 | Semi-final | 6th in league phase, Round of 16 |
| 2025–26 | 1 | V | 1st | | **Winners** | 4th in league phase, **Winners** |

=== Honours ===
International competitions

- UEFA Youth League: **2**
  - 2019–20, 2025–26

National competitions

- Liga Nacional / Superliga: **12**
  - 1976–77, 1977–78, 1978–79, 1979–80, 1981–82, 1982–83, 1984–85, 1985–86, 1986–87, 1987–88, 1989–90, 1992–93
- División de Honor: **16**
  - 1995–96, 1996–97, 1997–98, 1999–2000, 2003–04, 2005–06, 2006–07, 2009–10, 2010–11, 2012–13, 2013–14, 2016–17, 2019–20, 2022–23, 2024–25, 2025–26
- Copa de Campeones: **9**
  - 1994–95, 1996–97, 1999–2000, 2005–06, 2009–10, 2013–14, 2016–17, 2022–23, 2025–26
- Copa del Rey: **15**
  - 1953, 1968, 1969, 1971, 1978, 1981, 1982, 1985, 1988, 1991, 1993, 2013, 2017, 2022, 2023

== Juvenil B ==
=== Current squad ===
As of September 2026

Note: Flags indicate national team as defined under FIFA eligibility rules; some limited exceptions apply. Players may hold more than one non-FIFA nationality.

| No. | Pos. | Nation | Player |
|---|---|---|---|
| – | GK | ARG | Alber Castelau |
| – | GK | ESP | Héctor Martínez |
| – | GK | ESP | Izan Ramírez |
| – | DF | ESP | Alejandro Castaño |
| – | DF | ROU | Edu Corlat |
| – | DF | ESP | Rubén Díaz |
| – | DF | ESP | Jesús Palacios |
| – | DF | ESP | Diego Sánchez |
| – | DF | ESP | Victory Okorie |
| – | DF | ESP | Hugo Giner |
| – | MF | ESP | Bryan Bugarín |
| – | MF | ESP | Santiago del Pino |
| – | MF | ESP | Raúl Perțea |

| No. | Pos. | Nation | Player |
|---|---|---|---|
| – | FW | ESP | Álex Mora |
| – | MF | ESP | Mateo Pozo |
| – | MF | CUB | Jenry Hernández |
| – | MF | ESP | Jairo Morilla |
| – | MF | ESP | Beltrán Capote |
| – | MF | MAR | Omar Chaoui |
| – | MF | SWE | Leon Westin Bryhn |
| – | MF | ESP | Álvaro Rivera |
| – | MF | COL | Gorka Abascal |
| – | MF | ESP | Raúl Lema |
| – | FW | ESP | Pablo Martínez |
| – | FW | ESP | Pablo Ibáñez |
| – | FW | ESP | Carlos Sánchez |

== Juvenil C ==
=== Current squad ===
As of September 2026

Note: Flags indicate national team as defined under FIFA eligibility rules; some limited exceptions apply. Players may hold more than one non-FIFA nationality.

| No. | Pos. | Nation | Player |
|---|---|---|---|
| – | GK | ESP | Iván Vázquez |
| – | GK | ESP | David Kravets |
| – | GK | NGR | Imandudi Atchaakpo |
| – | DF | ESP | Adrián Morales |
| – | DF | ESP | Asier Sánchez |
| – | DF | ESP | Aitor Gandía |
| – | DF | ESP | Daniel González |
| – | DF | ESP | Joel Pallé |
| – | DF | ESP | Hugo Fernández |
| – | DF | ESP | Quim Kuelhmann |
| – | DF | ESP | Asier Santoyo |
| – | MF | ESP | Álvaro Barral |

| No. | Pos. | Nation | Player |
|---|---|---|---|
| – | MF | ESP | Nacho Alameda |
| – | MF | ESP | Hugo Moreno |
| – | MF | ESP | Martín Espuela |
| – | MF | ESP | Víctor Plazas |
| – | MF | ESP | Adrián Talavera |
| – | MF | ESP | Aitor Torondel |
| – | MF | ESP | Clifford Nana |
| – | MF | ESP | Dani Manso |
| – | MF | ESP | Javier Useros |
| – | FW | ESP | Unai Ordóñez |
| – | FW | ESP | Manu Navarro |
| – | FW | ESP | Aarón Silva |

== See also ==
- La Fábrica (Real Madrid)
- Real Madrid Castilla
- Real Madrid C
