= Sevilla FC (youth) =

Sevilla Juvenil A
- Full name: Sevilla Fútbol Club Juvenil A
- Nicknames: Los Rojiblancos (The White and Reds); Los Nervionenses (The Ones from Nervión); El Grande de Andalucía (The Great of Andalusia)
- Short name: SFC
- Ground: Ciudad Deportiva, Seville, Andalusia, Spain
- Capacity: 2,500
- President: José María del Nido Carrasco
- Coach: Lolo Rosano
- League: División de Honor
- 2018–2019: División de Honor, Gr. 4, 1st
- Website: sevillafc.es/cantera
Home colours	Away colours

Sevilla Futbol Club Juvenil are the under-19 team of Spanish professional football club Sevilla. The Juvenil A team plays in the Group IV of the División de Honor Juvenil de Fútbol where their main rivals are Real Betis and Málaga.

They also participate in the national Copa de Campeones Juvenil and the Copa del Rey Juvenil, qualification for which is dependent on final league group position, and have taken part in the continental UEFA Youth League.

== Juvenil A ==
=== Current squad ===
As of March 2020

Note: Flags indicate national team as defined under FIFA eligibility rules; some limited exceptions apply. Players may hold more than one non-FIFA nationality.

No.	Pos.	Nation	Player
—	GK	ESP	Marc Dolz
—	GK	ESP	Carlos Rodríguez
—	GK	ESP	Sergio Recio
—	DF	ESP	Alberto Espiñeira
—	DF	ESP	Álvaro Díaz
—	DF	ROU	Robert Jalade
—	DF	ESP	David López
—	MF	ESP	Jorge Moreno
—	MF	ESP	Jesús Cruz
—	MF	ESP	Alberto Collado
—	MF	ESP	Edu Altozano

No.	Pos.	Nation	Player
—	MF	ESP	Nacho Vizcaíno
—	FW	ESP	Iván Salguero
—	FW	ESP	Alberto González
—	FW	MEX	Juan Cortéz
—	FW	ESP	Álvaro Arquellada
—	FW	ESP	Carlos González
—	FW	ESP	Jesuli
—	FW	SEN	Ibrahima Sow
—	FW	SEN	Bakary Sow
—	FW	ESP	Iker Villar
—	FW	ESP	Carlos Colomer

== Season to season (Juvenil A) ==
=== Superliga / Liga de Honor sub-19 ===
Seasons with two or more trophies shown in bold

: :Season: :	Level	Group	Position	Copa del Rey Juvenil	Notes
1986–87	1		5th	Quarter-final	
1987–88	1		11th	Quarter-final	
1988–89	1		7th	Quarter-final	
1989–90	1		5th	Quarter-final	
1990–91	1		1st	Semi-final	
1991–92	1		10th	Semi-final	
1992–93	1		4th	Round of 16	
1993–94	1		8th	Round of 16	
1994–95	1		1st	Runners-up	

=== División de Honor Juvenil ===
Seasons with two or more trophies shown in bold

*Season*	Level	Group	Position	Copa del Rey Juv.	Copa de Campeones	Europe/notes
1995–96	1	4	1st	Quarter-final	2nd in group of 3	—N/a
**1996–97**	1	4	**1st**	**Winners**	Runners-up	—N/a
1997–98	1	4	1st	Quarter-final	2nd in group of 3	—N/a
1998–99	1	4	1st	Round of 16	Runners-up	—N/a
1999–00	1	4	1st	Round of 16	2nd in group of 3	—N/a
2000–01	1	4	4th	N/A	N/A	—N/a
2001–02	1	4	3rd	Semi-final	N/A	—N/a
2002–03	1	4	3rd	Quarter-final	N/A	—N/a
2003–04	1	4	1st	Round of 16	3rd in group of 3	—N/a
2004–05	1	4	1st	Semi-final	2nd in group of 3	—N/a
2005–06	1	4	4th	N/A	N/A	—N/a
2006–07	1	4	3rd	Quarter-final	N/A	—N/a
**2007–08**	1	4	**1st**	**Winners**	Semi-final	—N/a
**2008–09**	1	4	**1st**	**Winners**	Semi-final	—N/a
2009–10	1	4	3rd	N/A	N/A	—N/a
2010–11	1	4	1st	Round of 16	3rd in group of 3	—N/a
**2011–12**	1	4	**1st**	Round of 16	**Winners**	N/A
**2012–13**	1	4	**1st**	Quarter-final	**Winners**	N/A
2013–14	1	IV	2nd	Winners	Quarter-final	N/A
2014–15	1	IV	2nd	Round of 16	N/A	N/A
2015–16	1	IV	1st	Round of 16	Runners-up	2nd in group, Play-off round
2016–17	1	IV	2nd	Semi-final	N/A	1st in group, Round of 16
2017–18	1	IV	4th	N/A	N/A	3rd in group
2018–19	1	IV	1st	Round of 16	Semi-final	N/A
2019–20 (Note: In March 2020, all fixtures were suspended due to the COVID-19 pandemic in Spain. On 6 May 2020, the Royal Spanish Football Federation announced the premature end of the leagues, revoking all relegations, declaring each divisional leader as champion and cancelling the Copa del Rey Juvenil and the Copa de Campeones for the season.)	1	IV	1st	N/A	N/A	N/A
2020–21	1	IV-B/C	1st/2nd	N/A (Note: Copa del Rey Juvenil not held in 2020–21.)	N/A	N/A (Note: UEFA Youth League not held in 2020–21.)
2021–22	1	IV	3rd	Round of 32	N/A	2nd in group, Round of 16
2022–23	1	IV	2nd	Round of 32	N/A	4th in group
2023–24	1	IV	1st	Round of 32	Semi-final	2nd in group, Playoff round
2024–25	1	IV	2nd	Round of 32	N/A	N/A

== Honours ==
National competitions

- División de Honor (Note: Regional tournament.): 16
  - 1996, 1997, 1998, 1999, 2000, 2004, 2005, 2008, 2009, 2011, 2011–12, 2012–13, 2015–16, 2019, 2020, 2024
- Copa de Campeones (Note: National championship, Superliga / Liga de Honor sub-19 until 1995.): 4
  - 1991, 1995, 2012, 2013
- Copa del Rey: 6
  - 1962, 1979, 1997, 2008, 2009, 2014

== Juvenil B ==
Sevilla Juvenil B
- Full name: Sevilla Fútbol Club Juvenil B
- Nicknames: Los Rojiblancos (The White and Reds); Los Nervionenses (The Ones from Nervión); El Grande de Andalucía (The Great of Andalusia)
- Ground: Ciudad Deportiva, Seville, Andalusia, Spain
- Capacity: 2,500
- President: José María del Nido Carrasco
- Head coach: Juan Díaz Quinta
- League: Liga Nacional
- 2018-2019: Liga Nacional, Gr. 14, 1st
- Website: https://www.sevillafc.es/equipos/cantera
Home colours	Away colours

=== Current squad ===
As of March 2020

Note: Flags indicate national team as defined under FIFA eligibility rules; some limited exceptions apply. Players may hold more than one non-FIFA nationality.

No.	Pos.	Nation	Player
—	GK	ARG	Lorenzo Luchino
—	GK	ESP	Josema Calero
—	DF	ESP	Iván Soldán
—	DF	ESP	Antonio Soriano
—	DF	ESP	Dani Gil
—	DF	ESP	Jorge Mariano
—	DF	ESP	Mario Martínez
—	DF	ESP	Ángel Rodríguez
—	DF	ESP	José Manuel Ruiz
—	DF	ESP	Genís Torrelles

No.	Pos.	Nation	Player
—	MF	ESP	Raúl Uribe
—	MF	ESP	Juanma
—	MF	ESP	Emilio Benítez
—	MF	ESP	Manuel Maza
—	MF	ESP	Gonzalo Ballesteros
—	MF	ESP	Carlos Sanchez
—	FW	ESP	Titi Díaz
—	FW	ESP	Arnaudis Galván
—	FW	ESP	Dani Herrera
—	FW	ESP	Adrián Pérez

== See also ==
- Sevilla Atlético
- Sevilla FC C
