= 2024 Copa del Rey Juvenil =

Tournament details
- Country: Spain
- Teams: 32

Final positions
- Champions: Mallorca (1st title)
- Runners-up: Espanyol

Tournament statistics
- Matches played: 31

The 2024 Copa del Rey Juvenil was the 72nd staging of the Copa del Rey Juvenil de Fútbol, the national knockout tournament for youth (under-19) football in Spain.

== Format ==
The number of entrants remained at 32, as it had been since the expansion of the tournament in 2022 edition; the teams were invited based on their positions at the halfway stage in the season in the División de Honor Juvenil de Fútbol (top four in each of the seven groups, plus four highest-ranked 5th-placed), with the Copa del Rey being completed over several months in the second half of the season. Each round consisted of single matches played to a finish.

Unlike in the previous two seasons (where the first round draw was based on geographical proximity with teams from each regionalised División de Honor group facing one another in most cases), in this edition a fixed draw and seeding system was used, with the 1st-ranked teams playing the 4th- and 5th-ranked etc., and the potential path to the final for each team set before the opening round.

== Matches ==
=== Round of 32 ===
Played between 4 and 7 January 2024.

Team 1	Score	Team 2
Espanyol	3–1	Compostela
Elche	0–0 (Note: After extra time. Racing Santander win in penalty shootout.)	Racing Santander
Leganés	2–0	Universitario
Levante	7–0	Real Sociedad
Mallorca	5–1	Arucas
Real Oviedo	4–0	Granada
Atlético Madrid	2–0	Rayo Vallecano
Celta Vigo	1–4	Barcelona
Osasuna	0–2	Badalona
Tenerife	3–3 (Note: After extra time (2–2 after 90 minutes). Tenerife win 3–2 in penalty shootout.)	Rayo Majadahonda
Las Palmas	2–1	Valencia
Betis	3–0	Atlético Madrileño
Athletic Bilbao	0–1	Deportivo La Coruña
Damm	0–1	Villarreal
Antiguoko	1–3	Cádiz
Sevilla	1–2	Real Madrid

=== Round of 16 ===
Played on 24 January 2024.

Team 1	Score	Team 2
Cádiz	1–3	Real Oviedo
Betis	1–0	Tenerife
Levante	3–0	Atlético Madrid
Espanyol	2–1	Real Madrid
Leganés	4–0	Racing Santander
Barcelona	1–2	Badalona
Deportivo La Coruña	3–1	Las Palmas
Villarreal	1–2	Mallorca

=== Quarter-finals ===
Played on 14 February 2024.

Team 1	Score	Team 2
Real Oviedo	1–0	Levante
Espanyol	3–0	Betis
Badalona	1–0	Leganés
Mallorca	1–1 (Note: After extra time. Mallorca win in penalty shootout.)	Deportivo La Coruña

=== Semi-finals ===
Played on 7 March 2024. The semi-finals and final were each played over one leg at a mini-tournament in a single location (in this instance, in Oviedo).

Team 1	Score	Team 2
Badalona	0–5	Mallorca
Espanyol	3–1	Real Oviedo

== Final ==
10 March 2024
11:00

Mallorca	0 – 0 (a.e.t.)	Espanyol
Penalties
	4–2

Estadio Carlos Tartiere
Referee: Luis Enrique Morona del Campo

Mallorca	Espanyol

== See also ==
- 2003 Copa del Rey Juvenil (final played between same teams)
- 2023–24 División de Honor Juvenil de Fútbol
