= 2015–16 División de Honor Juvenil de Fútbol =

División de Honor Juvenil de Fútbol
- Season: 2015–16

The 2015–16 División de Honor Juvenil de Fútbol season is the 30th since its establishment. The regular season began on 6 September 2015 and ends on 17 April 2016.

== Competition format ==
- The champion of each group and the best runner-up will play in the Copa de Campeones and the Copa del Rey.
- The other six runners-up and the two best third-placed teams qualify for the Copa del Rey.
- In each group, at least four teams (thirteenth placed on down) will be relegated to Liga Nacional.
- The champion of the Copa de Campeones will get a place for the 2016–17 UEFA Youth League.

== League tables ==
=== Group I ===
Pos	Team	Pld	W	D	L	GF	GA	GD	Pts	Qualification or relegation
1	Racing de Santander	30	22	4	4	70	36	+34	70	Copa de Campeones
2	Real Oviedo	30	22	3	5	76	30	+46	69	Copa del Rey
3	Sporting de Gijón	30	20	6	4	68	26	+42	66	Copa del Rey
4	Celta de Vigo	30	18	3	9	71	38	+33	57	
5	Deportivo de La Coruña	30	17	4	9	69	44	+25	55	
6	Lugo	30	16	4	10	54	39	+15	52	
7	Bansander	30	11	7	12	57	61	−4	40	
8	Tropezón	30	10	5	15	36	44	−8	35	
9	Roces	30	10	5	15	38	50	−12	35	
10	Val Miñor	30	10	3	17	35	49	−14	33	
11	Alondras	30	10	3	17	34	58	−24	33	
12	Pabellón Ourense	30	8	8	14	42	59	−17	32	
13	Llano 2000	30	8	6	16	33	51	−18	30	Relegated to Liga Nacional
14	Victoria	30	7	6	17	47	69	−22	27	Relegated to Liga Nacional
15	Atlético Perines	30	7	4	19	42	76	−34	25	Relegated to Liga Nacional
16	Ourense	30	6	5	19	27	69	−42	23	Relegated to Liga Nacional

=== Group II ===
Pos	Team	Pld	W	D	L	GF	GA	GD	Pts	Qualification or relegation
1	Athletic Bilbao	30	22	4	4	86	34	+52	70	Copa de Campeones
2	Antiguoko	30	18	5	7	54	26	+28	59	Copa del Rey
3	Danok Bat	30	17	5	8	61	36	+25	56	
4	Osasuna	30	16	8	6	55	30	+25	56	
5	Real Sociedad	30	15	5	10	50	41	+9	50	
6	Numancia	30	13	5	12	43	34	+9	44	
7	Oberena	30	12	7	11	50	47	+3	43	
8	Alavés	30	13	4	13	47	45	+2	43	
9	Eibar	30	11	9	10	35	33	+2	42	
10	San Juan	30	10	11	9	39	42	−3	41	
11	Aurrerá Vitoria	30	10	8	12	33	40	−7	38	
12	Txantrea	30	8	13	9	52	59	−7	37	
13	Barakaldo	30	9	10	11	40	55	−15	37	Relegated to Liga Nacional
14	Durango	30	5	6	19	30	61	−31	21	Relegated to Liga Nacional
15	Comillas	30	4	7	19	27	59	−32	19	Relegated to Liga Nacional
16	Indartsu	30	2	3	25	28	88	−60	9	Relegated to Liga Nacional

=== Group III ===
Pos	Team	Pld	W	D	L	GF	GA	GD	Pts	Qualification or relegation
1	Espanyol	30	24	5	1	70	24	+46	77	Copa de Campeones
2	Mallorca	30	21	5	4	72	25	+47	68	Copa del Rey
3	Damm	30	20	6	4	65	23	+42	66	
4	FC Barcelona	30	17	7	6	68	30	+38	58	
5	Real Zaragoza	30	14	7	9	49	38	+11	49	
6	Gimnàstic de Tarragona	30	11	10	9	54	49	+5	43	
7	Sant Andreu	30	12	5	13	39	45	−6	41	
8	San Francisco	30	10	10	10	32	36	−4	40	
9	Cornellà	30	10	7	13	40	46	−6	37	
10	Manacor	30	8	10	12	25	48	−23	34	
11	Girona	30	9	6	15	39	53	−14	33	
12	Atlético Baleares	30	9	6	15	32	51	−19	33	
13	Lleida Esportiu	30	8	5	17	34	52	−18	29	Relegated to Liga Nacional
14	Ebro	30	7	4	19	29	62	−33	25	Relegated to Liga Nacional
15	La Salle	30	6	4	20	23	51	−28	22	Relegated to Liga Nacional
16	Stadium Casablanca	30	3	5	22	19	57	−38	14	Relegated to Liga Nacional

=== Group IV ===
Pos	Team	Pld	W	D	L	GF	GA	GD	Pts	Qualification or relegation
1	Sevilla	30	22	6	2	59	15	+44	72	Copa de Campeones
2	Málaga	30	21	7	2	74	21	+53	70	Copa de Campeones
3	Real Betis	30	17	8	5	63	23	+40	59	
4	Almería	30	17	6	7	58	26	+32	57	
5	Granada	30	13	7	10	57	45	+12	46	
6	Sevilla Este	30	13	5	12	37	35	+2	44	
7	Córdoba	30	12	6	12	50	45	+5	42	
8	San Félix	30	11	8	11	41	46	−5	41	
9	Cádiz	30	11	7	12	43	46	−3	40	
10	La Cañada Atlético	30	9	9	12	40	51	−11	36	
11	Recreativo de Huelva	30	8	10	12	37	53	−16	34	
12	San Juan	30	8	6	16	35	56	−21	30	
13	Santa Fe	30	8	5	17	27	56	−29	29	Relegated to Liga Nacional
14	26 de Febrero	30	7	7	16	38	67	−29	28	Relegated to Liga Nacional
15	Marbella	30	4	9	17	25	55	−30	21	Relegated to Liga Nacional
16	Séneca	30	3	6	21	17	61	−44	15	Relegated to Liga Nacional

=== Group V ===
Pos	Team	Pld	W	D	L	GF	GA	GD	Pts	Qualification or relegation
1	Atlético Madrid	30	22	4	4	87	23	+64	70	Copa de Campeones
2	Rayo Vallecano	30	21	6	3	63	28	+35	69	Copa del Rey
3	Real Madrid	30	20	8	2	86	23	+63	68	Copa del Rey
4	Getafe	30	18	6	6	58	27	+31	60	
5	Real Valladolid	30	15	7	8	59	34	+25	52	
6	Fútbol Peña	30	12	7	11	42	48	−6	43	
7	Trival Valderas	30	13	4	13	48	61	−13	43	
8	Diocesano	30	11	7	12	43	49	−6	40	
9	RSD Alcalá	30	11	6	13	39	43	−4	39	
10	Leganés	30	9	8	13	33	41	−8	35	
11	Rayo Majadahonda	30	10	5	15	38	49	−11	35	
12	Alcorcón	30	9	7	14	43	47	−4	34	
13	UDC Sur	30	9	5	16	38	54	−16	32	Relegated to Liga Nacional
14	Las Rozas	30	9	4	17	36	61	−25	31	Relegated to Liga Nacional
15	Flecha Negra	30	3	4	23	23	74	−51	13	Relegated to Liga Nacional
16	Puebla de la Calzada	30	1	6	23	16	90	−74	9	Relegated to Liga Nacional

=== Group VI ===
Pos	Team	Pld	W	D	L	GF	GA	GD	Pts	Qualification or relegation
1	Las Palmas	30	27	2	1	106	14	+92	83	Copa de Campeones
2	Tenerife	30	17	9	4	66	26	+40	60	Copa del Rey
3	Longuera-Toscal	30	15	8	7	53	47	+6	53	
4	San José	30	16	4	10	48	44	+4	52	
5	Estrella	30	13	6	11	47	46	+1	45	
6	Juventud Marítima	30	13	5	12	41	48	−7	44	
7	Telde	30	11	7	12	51	49	+2	40	
8	Arucas	30	10	9	11	31	34	−3	39	
9	Acodetti	30	11	6	13	38	39	−1	39	
10	Huracán	30	10	9	11	42	36	+6	39	
11	Sobradillo	30	11	6	13	46	42	+4	39	
12	Tahíche	30	10	4	16	33	56	−23	34	
13	Unión Viera	30	10	3	17	34	59	−25	33	Relegated to Liga Nacional
14	Laguna	30	8	7	15	32	50	−18	31	Relegated to Liga Nacional
15	Juventud Laguna	30	7	8	15	26	47	−21	29	Relegated to Liga Nacional
16	Ofra	30	2	5	23	29	86	−57	11	Relegated to Liga Nacional

=== Group VII ===
Pos	Team	Pld	W	D	L	GF	GA	GD	Pts	Qualification or relegation
1	Villarreal	30	21	6	3	85	31	+54	69	Copa de Campeones
2	Levante	30	18	4	8	52	24	+28	58	Copa del Rey
3	Valencia	30	16	8	6	70	29	+41	56	
4	Elche	30	14	11	5	50	39	+11	53	
5	Lorquí	30	14	5	11	45	43	+2	47	
6	Atlético Madrileño	30	11	11	8	34	30	+4	44	
7	Roda	30	10	9	11	37	38	−1	39	
8	Huracán Valencia	30	11	6	13	26	34	−8	39	
9	Albacete	30	10	9	11	32	35	−3	39	
10	Real Murcia	30	10	8	12	37	41	−4	38	
11	UCAM Murcia	30	10	7	13	30	50	−20	37	
12	Castellón	30	8	10	12	34	36	−2	34	
13	Cartagena FC	30	9	5	16	26	50	−24	32	Relegated to Liga Nacional
14	Conquense	30	7	7	16	30	59	−29	28	Relegated to Liga Nacional
15	Alcoyano	30	5	9	16	38	58	−20	24	Relegated to Liga Nacional
16	Torre Levante	30	5	7	18	36	65	−29	22	Relegated to Liga Nacional

== Copa de Campeones ==
The seven group champions and the best runner-up were qualified to this competition whose winner will play the 2016–17 UEFA Youth League. The draw was held at the headquarters of the Royal Spanish Football Federation on 19 April 2016.

Quarterfinals; 2 May
I	Racing Santander	3
III	Espanyol	5
Group A
V	Atlético Madrid	0
IV	Sevilla	1
VII	Villarreal	1
VI	Las Palmas	2
Group B
WC	Málaga	1 (6)
II	Athletic Bilbao	1 (5)

Semifinals; 4 May
III	Espanyol	0
IV	Sevilla	1
VI	Las Palmas	0
WC	Málaga	2

Final; 7 May
IV	Sevilla	1 (0)
WC	Málaga	1 (3)

=== Quarter-finals ===
2 May 2016	Racing Santander	3–5 (a.e.t.)	Espanyol	Vera
10:30	Pablo Goñi 4', 15' (pen.); Gon 17'		Adrián Rivas 3'; Edgar González 12'; Lluís López 45'; Cristo Chávez 109'; Pedrosa 114'	Stadium: Las Viñas; Referee: Fernando Pérez Martín

2 May 2016	Atlético Madrid	0–1	Sevilla	Vera
12:45			Miguel Martín 25' (pen.)	Stadium: Las Viñas; Referee: Sergio Rodríguez Morales

2 May 2016	Villarreal	1–2	Las Palmas	Vera
17:00	Villa 40'		Carlos Cabrera 56', 89'	Stadium: Las Viñas; Referee: Alejandro Gil Sergio

2 May 2016	Málaga	1–1 (a.e.t.) (6 – 5 p)	Athletic Bilbao	Vera
19:45	Zalazar 49'		Vicente 73' (pen.)	Stadium: Las Viñas; Referee: Javier Fernández Rodríguez

=== Semifinals ===
4 May 2016	Espanyol	0–1	Sevilla	Vera
16:00			Mena 39' (pen.)	Stadium: Las Viñas; Attendance: 3,000; Referee: Muñoz Arjona

4 May 2016	Las Palmas	0–2	Málaga	Vera
18:30			Muñoz 33'; Ontiveros 67'	Stadium: Las Viñas

=== Final ===
7 May 2016	Sevilla	1–1 (a.e.t.) (0–3 p)	Málaga	Vera
19:00	Adriano 100'	Report	En-Nesyri 110'	Stadium: Las Viñas; Referee: José Antonio Sánchez Villalobos
	Penalties
	Javi Pérez (penalty missed); Pozo (penalty missed); Genaro (penalty missed)		Manu Cordero (penalty scored); Arturo (penalty scored); David Muñoz (penalty missed); Castillo (penalty scored)

Copa de Campeones
winners
Málaga CF
2nd title

== See also ==
- 2016 Copa del Rey Juvenil
