= División de Honor Juvenil de Fútbol =

División de Honor
- Founded: 1986; 40 years ago (as Superliga Juvenil)
- Country: Spain
- Confederation: UEFA
- Level on pyramid: 1
- Relegation to: Liga Nacional
- Domestic cup(s): Copa de Campeones; Copa del Rey Juvenil
- International cup: UEFA Youth League
- Current champions: Real Madrid (2025–26)
- Most championships: Real Madrid (13 titles)
- Website: rfef.es
- Current: 2025–26 División de Honor Juvenil de Fútbol

The División de Honor Juvenil is the top level of the Spanish football league system for youth players 19 years old and under. The División de Honor is administered by the RFEF through the Liga Nacional de Fútbol Aficionado (LNFA).

== Format ==
The División de Honor begins the first weekend in September and ends in April or May. The División de Honor's season is similar to the senior players' La Liga playing a double round-robin points based system. There are seven groups of 16 teams. The teams with the most points in each group are declared champion of its group and advance to the Copa de Campeones Juvenil de Fútbol. In each group, the teams placing 13th and below are relegated to the Liga Nacional or the Canarias Preferente in the case of those teams from the Canary Islands (Group6).

== History ==
Created in 1986, the Superliga Juvenil was a national league with 16 teams. However, traveling across the country caused financial hardships for some clubs. Real Valladolid (in 1993), and Las Palmas and Espanyol (in 1994) dropped out of the league. Real Madrid withdrew from the league in 1994 when their second reserve team Real Madrid C kept their status in the Segunda División B. 15 teams played in 1994–95 and the league was disbanded after the season. In 1995, the RFEF elevated the six regional based groups of the División de Honor (which was the second level) as the top youth level and created a new tournament to crown the overall youth champion of Spain.

== Copa de Campeones de Juvenil ==
The Copa de Campeones is a two phrase tournament that starts a week after the end of the División de Honor held at a site selected by the RFEF.

Until 2011, the seven group winners were divided into two groups: Group A had three teams and was played in a round-robin format, while group B was composed by four and was played in a single elimination format. The two group winners played the final match.

Since the 2011–12 season, the seven group winners and the best runner-up are drawn into a knock-out tournament in a neutral venue determined by the Royal Spanish Football Federation.

Each team nominates an 18-man roster. There are no replacements for sickness or injury even if it is a goalkeeper.

Since the 2014–15 season, the winner qualifies to the UEFA Youth League.

== Copa del Rey Juvenil ==
- 32 teams qualify to the main domestic cup:
  - 28 teams placed 1st-4th in each of the 7 groups after 1 round of league matches completed
  - 4 best 5th-placed teams

=== History ===
Established in 1950, the Campeonato de España was Spain's top tournament for youth teams for over thirty years. Barcelona won the first cup, Copa de Su Excelencia Generalísimo and now holds the record for winning the most (currently 18). Since 1976, teams are playing for the Copa de Su Majestad El Rey Don Juan Carlos I or Copa del Rey.

=== Format ===
Since 1995, the Campeonato de España/Copa del Rey started a week after the Copa de Campeones and was played in four rounds. The top two from each División de Honor group plus the best two third-placed teams qualified. The first round, Quarterfinal and Semifinal are played in two legs and the Final is one match at a neutral site.

In 2022 the format was extended to 32 teams based on their performance in the first half of the season with the cup played during the second half, and the semi-finals and final taking place in a mini-tournament at a single location.

== Restructuring ==
=== 2005–06 ===
For the 2005–06 season, the RFEF reorganized Grupo IV of División de Honor as the Andaluza Group similar to the Canarias have in Grupo VI. Teams from the autonomous cities of Ceuta and Melilla also included.

=== 2006–07 ===
For the 2006–07 season, the RFEF added another 16-team regional group.

== Champions ==
=== Superliga Juvenil ===
Season	Champion	Runner-up
1986–87	Real Madrid	Barcelona
1987–88	Real Madrid	Barcelona
1988–89	Athletic Bilbao	Osasuna
1989–90	Real Madrid	Real Betis

=== Liga de Honor Sub-19 ===
Season	Champion	Runner-up
1990–91	Sevilla	Barcelona
1991–92	Athletic Bilbao	Real Madrid
1992–93	Real Madrid	Valladolid
1993–94	Barcelona	Valencia
1994–95	Sevilla	Barcelona

=== División de Honor ===
In gold, champions of the Copa de Campeones; in silver, runners-up of this tournament.

Season	Group I	Group II	Group III	Group IV	Group V	Group VI	Group VII	Wildcard
1994–95	Racing	Osasuna	Barcelona	Sevilla	Real Madrid	Tenerife	—N/a	—N/a
1995–96	Deportivo	Athletic Bilbao	Valencia	Sevilla	Real Madrid	Tenerife	—N/a	—N/a
1996–97	Celta	Real Sociedad	Espanyol	Sevilla	Real Madrid	Las Palmas	—N/a	—N/a
1997–98	Oviedo	Real Sociedad	Valencia	Sevilla	Real Madrid	Las Palmas	—N/a	—N/a
1998–99	Valladolid	Real Sociedad	Espanyol	Sevilla	Hércules	Tenerife	—N/a	—N/a
1999–00	Valladolid	Zaragoza	Barcelona	Sevilla	Real Madrid	Las Palmas	—N/a	—N/a
2000–01	Valladolid	Osasuna	Barcelona	Goyu-Ryu	Atlético Madrid	Las Palmas	—N/a	—N/a
2001–02	Celta	Zaragoza	Espanyol	Real Betis	Atlético Madrid	Tenerife	—N/a	—N/a
2002–03	Salamanca	Athletic	Espanyol	Málaga	Atlético Madrid	Tenerife	—N/a	—N/a
2003–04	Sporting	Athletic	Espanyol	Sevilla	Real Madrid	Las Palmas	—N/a	—N/a
2004–05	Sporting	Osasuna	Barcelona	Sevilla	Atlético Madrid	Las Palmas	—N/a	—N/a
2005–06	Valladolid	Zaragoza	Barcelona	Betis	Real Madrid	Las Palmas	—N/a	—N/a
2006–07	Celta	Antiguoko	Espanyol	Málaga	Real Madrid	Las Palmas	Valencia	—N/a
2007–08	Deportivo	Real Sociedad	Espanyol	Sevilla	Rayo Vallecano	Las Palmas	Villarreal	—N/a
2008–09	Celta	Athletic	Barcelona	Sevilla	Atlético Madrid	Tenerife	Villarreal	—N/a
2009–10	Deportivo	Athletic	Barcelona	Betis	Real Madrid	Las Palmas	Valencia	—N/a
2010–11	Racing	Athletic	Barcelona	Sevilla	Real Madrid	Las Palmas	Villarreal	—N/a
2011–12	Sporting	Real Sociedad	Espanyol	Sevilla	Atlético Madrid	Las Palmas	Valencia	Barcelona
2012–13	Celta	Athletic	Barcelona	Sevilla	Real Madrid	Las Palmas	Villarreal	Atlético Madrid
2013–14	Racing	Real Sociedad	Barcelona	Málaga	Real Madrid	Las Palmas	Valencia	Sevilla
2014–15	Celta	Real Sociedad	Espanyol	Málaga	Rayo Vallecano	Las Palmas	Villarreal	Real Madrid
2015–16	Racing	Athletic	Espanyol	Sevilla	Atlético Madrid	Las Palmas	Villarreal	Málaga
2016–17	Celta	Osasuna	Barcelona	Málaga	Real Madrid	Las Palmas	Villarreal	Atlético Madrid
2017–18	Sporting	Athletic	Barcelona	Málaga	Atlético Madrid	Las Palmas	Atlético Madrileño	Tenerife
2018–19	Celta	Numancia	Zaragoza	Sevilla	Atlético Madrid	Tenerife	Villarreal	Real Madrid
2019–20 (Note: In March 2020, all fixtures were suspended due to the COVID-19 pandemic in Spain. On 6 May 2020, the Royal Spanish Football Federation announced the premature end of the leagues, revoking all relegations, declaring each divisional leader as champion and cancelling the Copa del Rey Juvenil and the Copa de Campeones for the season.)	Celta (Note: With the Copa de Campeones cancelled, Celta Vigo were nominated as the 'league path' entrant for the 2020–21 UEFA Youth League (which eventually was also cancelled due to the pandemic) as they had the best divisional record across the country, just ahead of Real Madrid.)	Athletic	Barcelona	Sevilla	Real Madrid	Las Palmas	Villarreal	N/A
2020–21	Deportivo	Athletic	Barcelona	Málaga	Atlético Madrid	Las Palmas	Levante	Real Madrid
2021–22	Celta	Athletic	Barcelona	Betis	Atlético Madrid	Las Palmas	Valencia	Deportivo
2022–23	Celta	Athletic	Barcelona	Betis	Real Madrid	Las Palmas	Valencia	Atlético Madrid
2023–24	Deportivo	Athletic	Mallorca	Sevilla	Atlético Madrid	Las Palmas	Levante	Betis
2024–25	Deportivo	Athletic	Barcelona	Betis	Real Madrid	Las Palmas	Valencia	Tenerife
2025–26	Celta	Athletic	Barcelona	Granada	Real Madrid	Las Palmas	Valencia	Tenerife
