= Copa de Campeones Juvenil de Fútbol =

- Country: Spain
- Confederation: UEFA
- Number of clubs: 8
- Domestic cup: Copa del Rey
- International cup: UEFA Youth League
- Current champions: Real Madrid (2026 – 9th title)
- Most championships: Real Madrid (9 titles)
- Website: rfef.es
- Current: 2026

The Copa de Campeones de Juvenil is the tournament created by the RFEF to determine the overall youth champion of Spain.

Since the 2014–15 season, the winner of this competition will qualify for the UEFA Youth League.

== Competition format ==
The winners of the seven groups of the División de Honor and the best runner-up qualify for this competition. It is played with a single-elimination tournament format.

== Champions ==
Season	Host	Winner	Runner-up	Score
1995	Linares	Real Madrid	Sevilla	4–1
1996	Puertollano	Deportivo	Real Madrid	2–1
1997	Almendralejo	Real Madrid	Sevilla	2–0
1998	San Sebastián	Real Sociedad	Valencia	2–1
1999	Alicante	Real Sociedad	Sevilla	0–0 (4–3p)
2000	Albacete	Real Madrid	Barcelona	4–2
2001	Seville	Osasuna	Atlético Madrid	1–0
2002	Almería	Atlético Madrid	Zaragoza	3–0
2003	Cambrils	Málaga	Espanyol	2–0
2004	Guadalajara	Sporting	Espanyol	0–0 (4–1p)
2005	Las Rozas	Barcelona	Sporting	3–1
2006	León	Real Madrid	Valladolid	1–0
2007	Antequera	Valencia	Real Madrid	3–1
2008	Colmenar Viejo	Espanyol	Villarreal	2–1
2009	Almuñécar	Barcelona	Celta	2–0
2010	Benidorm	Real Madrid	Valencia	3–1
2011	Lepe	Barcelona	Real Madrid	3–1
2012	Lepe	Sevilla	Espanyol	1–0
2013	Vigo	Sevilla	Celta	3–2
2014	Vera	Real Madrid	Real Sociedad	1–1 (7–6p)
2015	Almuñécar	Villarreal	Espanyol	3–2
2016	Vera	Málaga	Sevilla	1–1 (3–0p)
2017	Ourense	Real Madrid	Málaga	1–0 (a.e.t.)
2018	Ciudad Real	Atlético Madrid	Sporting	3–1
2019	Vigo	Zaragoza	Villarreal	0–0 (7–6p)
2020	Not played (Note: On 6 May 2020, the Royal Spanish Football Federation announced the cancellation of the Copa de Campeones Juvenil for the season due to the COVID-19 pandemic in Spain.) (Note: Celta Vigo were nominated as the 'league path' entrant for the 2020–21 UEFA Youth League (which eventually was also cancelled due to the pandemic) as they had the best divisional record across the country, just ahead of Real Madrid.)			
2021	Marbella	Deportivo	Barcelona	3–1
2022	Las Rozas	Barcelona	Athletic Bilbao	2–0
2023	Las Rozas	Real Madrid	Betis	3–1
2024	Nerja	Atlético Madrid	Betis	1–0
2025	Ponferrada	Betis	Valencia	3–1
2026	Alcalá de Henares	Real Madrid	Barcelona	4–1

== Performance by club ==
Team	Winners	Runners-up	Winning years
Real Madrid	9	3	1995, 1997, 2000, 2006, 2010, 2014, 2017, 2023, 2026
Barcelona	4	3	2005, 2009, 2011, 2022
Atlético Madrid	3	1	2002, 2018, 2024
Sevilla	2	4	2012, 2013
Real Sociedad	2	1	1998, 1999
Málaga	2	1	2003, 2016
Deportivo	2	0	1996, 2021
Espanyol	1	4	2008
Valencia	1	3	2007
Sporting	1	2	2004
Villarreal	1	2	2015
Betis	1	2	2025
Zaragoza	1	1	2019
Osasuna	1	0	2001
Celta	0	2	
Valladolid	0	1	
Athletic Bilbao	0	1	

== See also ==
- División de Honor Juvenil de Fútbol
- Copa del Rey Juvenil de Fútbol
