= 2022 Copa del Rey Juvenil =

Tournament details
- Country: Spain
- Teams: 32

Final positions
- Champions: Real Madrid (14th title)
- Runners-up: Espanyol

Tournament statistics
- Matches played: 31

The 2022 Copa del Rey Juvenil was the 70th staging of the Copa del Rey Juvenil de Fútbol, the national knockout tournament for youth (under-19) football in Spain.

== Format ==
The COVID-19 pandemic in Spain led to the 2020 and 2021 editions of the competition being cancelled. The hiatus led to the format being revised by the Royal Spanish Football Federation (the senior men's Copa del Rey and women's Copa de la Reina de Fútbol had also been revamped in recent years). Previously a 16-team end-of season tournament with qualification based on the finishing positions in the División de Honor Juvenil de Fútbol, 32 teams were now invited based on their league positions at the halfway stage (top four in each of the seven groups, plus four highest-ranked 5th-placed), with the Copa del Rey being completed over several months in the second half of the season. Two-leg ties were also replaced by single matches in each round. The first round draw was based on geographical proximity, with teams from each regionalised División de Honor group facing one another in most cases.

== Matches ==
=== Round of 32 ===
Played between 15 January 2022 and 3 February 2022.

Team 1	Score	Team 2
Racing Santander	2–0	Atlético Perines
Alboraya	0–0 (Note: Alboraya win penalty shootout.)	Alzira
Atlético Madrid	4–1	Cultural Leonesa
Osasuna	3–2	Alavés
Espanyol	2–1	Mallorca
Real Madrid	3–0	Rayo Vallecano
Celta Vigo	2–1	Deportivo La Coruña
Athletic Bilbao	2–1	Eibar
Valencia	1–1 (Note: Levante win 5–4 in penalty shootout.)	Levante
Las Palmas	4–1	Huracán
Tenerife	2–0	San José
Granada	2–0	Leganés
Villarreal	6–1	Tudelano
Barcelona	0–1	Damm
Sevilla	0–2	Betis
Málaga	2–1	Cádiz

=== Round of 16 ===
Played on 26 and 27 February 2022.

Team 1	Score	Team 2
Villarreal	1–2	Real Madrid
Las Palmas	2–6	Atlético Madrid
Racing Santander	1–1 (Note: Betis win 4–3 in penalty shootout.)	Betis
Osasuna	1–2	Espanyol
Damm	1–2	Granada
Málaga	0–2	Celta Vigo
Levante	3–2	Athletic Bilbao
Tenerife	2–1	Alboraya

=== Quarter-finals ===
Played on 26 and 27 March 2022.

Team 1	Score	Team 2
Atlético Madrid	1–2	Betis
Levante	0–2	Espanyol
Real Madrid	5–2	Tenerife
Celta Vigo	4–1	Granada

=== Semi-finals ===
Played on 13 April 2022. The semi-finals and final were each played over one leg at a mini-tournament in a single location (in this instance, in Lugo).

Team 1	Score	Team 2
Betis	0–5	Real Madrid
Espanyol	3–0	Celta Vigo

== Final ==
Final

16 April 2022

Espanyol	1 – 2 (a.e.t.)	Real Madrid
Miguel 7'		Lorenzo 10'; Pipi 95'

Estadio Anxo Carro

Espanyol	Real Madrid

== See also ==
- 2001 Copa del Rey Juvenil (final played between same clubs)
- 2021–22 División de Honor Juvenil de Fútbol
