= 2021–22 División de Honor Juvenil de Fútbol =

División de Honor Juvenil de Fútbol
- Season: 2021–22
- Champions: Barcelona (Copa de Campeones)

The 2021–22 División de Honor Juvenil de Fútbol was the 36th season of the highest-level under-19 football league competition in Spain since its establishment.

== Competition format ==
The format of the competition returned to normal after some changes to the previous season caused by the COVID-19 pandemic in Spain. Teams were divided into seven regionalised groups playing each other twice, with the champion of each group and the best runner-up qualifying for the 2022 Copa de Campeones, and four teams in each group relegated to the Liga Nacional.

- The champion of the Copa de Campeones would get a place in the 2022–23 UEFA Youth League (not transferable if they also qualified due to the club's senior team reaching the UEFA Champions League group stage).
- The Copa del Rey Juvenil, which had not been played since 2019, had a change of format, with the best 32 teams after the first round of matches in the División de Honor now qualifying for the tournament, which would be played in the second half of the season (the previous format of the 16 best at the season's end was closer to the Copa de Campeones).

== Regular season ==
Group 1

- Champions: Celta Vigo
- Runners-up: Deportivo La Coruña – best ranked runner-up
- 3rd place: Racing Santander

Group 2

- Champions: Athletic Bilbao
- Runners-up: Osasuna
- 3rd place: Eibar

Group 3

- Champions: Barcelona
- Runners-up: Espanyol
- 3rd place: Damm

Group 4

- Champions: Betis
- Runners-up: Granada
- 3rd place: Sevilla

Group 5

- Champions: Atlético Madrid
- Runners-up: Real Madrid
- 3rd place: Leganés

Group 6

- Champions: Las Palmas
- Runners-up: Tenerife
- 3rd place: Arucas

Group 7

- Champions: Valencia
- Runners-up: Levante
- 3rd place: Villarreal

== Copa de Campeones ==
The quarter-finals were played over a single leg at the home ground of one of the participating clubs; the semi-finals and final were each played over one leg at a mini-tournament in a single location (in this instance, in Las Rozas de Madrid).

Quarter-finals

| Team 1 | Score | Team 2 |
|---|---|---|
| Atlético Madrid | 1–1 (Note: Celta won 3–2 in a penalty shootout.) | Celta Vigo |
| Barcelona | 2–0 | Valencia |
| Athletic Bilbao | 1–0 | Las Palmas |
| Betis | 3–1 | Deportivo La Coruña |

Semi-finals

| Team 1 | Score | Team 2 |
|---|---|---|
| Athletic Bilbao | 1–0 | Betis |
| Celta Vigo | 3–4 | Barcelona |

Final

4 June 2022

| Barcelona | 2 – 0 | Athletic Bilbao |
|---|---|---|
| Valle 25'; Fermín 90+3' |

La Ciudad del Fútbol
Attendance: 300
Referee: Jerónimo Montes García-Navas

| Barcelona | Athletic Bilbao |

== See also ==
- 2022 Copa del Rey Juvenil
