= 2014–15 División de Honor Juvenil de Fútbol =

División de Honor Juvenil de Fútbol
- Season: 2014–15

The 2014–15 División de Honor Juvenil de Fútbol season is the 29th since its establishment. The regular season began on August 30, 2013, and ends on April 19, 2015. The Copa de Campeones will start May 4 and end with the final on May 9 in Almuñécar, Granada. The Copa del Rey starts the week of May 17 and will end on the week of June 27 with the final at the Estadio Alfonso Murube in Ceuta.

== Competition format ==
- The champion of each group and the best runner-up will play in the Copa de Campeones and the Copa del Rey.
- The other six runners-up and the two best third-placed teams qualify for the Copa del Rey.
- In each group, at least four teams (thirteenth placed on down) will be relegated to Liga Nacional.
- The champion of the Copa de Campeones will get a place for the 2015–16 UEFA Youth League.

== League tables ==
=== Group I ===
Pos	Team	Pld	W	D	L	GF	GA	GD	Pts	Qualification or relegation
1	Celta de Vigo	30	23	4	3	88	19	+69	73	Copa de Campeones
2	Deportivo de La Coruña	30	20	4	6	76	37	+39	64	Copa del Rey
3	Racing de Santander	30	17	7	6	71	36	+35	58	
4	Real Oviedo	30	17	3	10	66	52	+14	54	
5	Val Miñor	30	13	5	12	44	43	+1	44	
6	Sporting de Gijón	30	12	7	11	63	44	+19	43	
7	Pabellón Ourense	30	12	7	11	40	42	−2	43	
8	Tropezón	30	11	9	10	37	40	−3	42	
9	Llano 2000	30	10	9	11	28	40	−12	39	
10	Atlético Perines	30	10	8	12	38	45	−7	38	
11	Alondras	30	10	6	14	42	66	−24	36	
12	Lugo	30	10	6	14	35	50	−15	36	
13	Porriño Industrial	30	10	5	15	45	59	−14	35	Relegated to Liga Nacional
14	Pontevedra	30	8	7	15	48	69	−21	31	Relegated to Liga Nacional
15	Veriña	30	7	1	22	36	67	−31	22	Relegated to Liga Nacional
16	Astur	30	3	6	21	28	76	−48	15	Relegated to Liga Nacional

=== Group II ===
Pos	Team	Pld	W	D	L	GF	GA	GD	Pts	Qualification or relegation
1	Real Sociedad	30	22	2	6	67	27	+40	68	Copa de Campeones
2	Athletic Bilbao	30	21	2	7	63	30	+33	65	Copa del Rey
3	Osasuna	30	16	11	3	56	24	+32	59	
4	Danok Bat	30	17	7	6	52	26	+26	58	
5	Antiguoko	30	15	6	9	51	37	+14	51	
6	Alavés	30	11	9	10	50	48	+2	42	
7	Barakaldo	30	11	5	14	42	54	−12	38	
8	San Juan	30	11	5	14	32	40	−8	38	
9	Eibar	30	10	6	14	36	37	−1	36	
10	Txantrea	30	9	6	15	35	51	−16	33	
11	Numancia	30	9	6	15	26	45	−19	33	
12	Indartsu	30	7	11	12	36	44	−8	32	
13	UD Logroñés	30	7	10	13	33	45	−12	31	Relegated to Liga Nacional
14	Valvanera	30	7	8	15	23	50	−27	29	Relegated to Liga Nacional
15	Arenas de Getxo	30	7	6	17	35	54	−19	27	Relegated to Liga Nacional
16	Amigó	30	7	6	17	33	58	−25	27	Relegated to Liga Nacional

=== Group III ===
Pos	Team	Pld	W	D	L	GF	GA	GD	Pts	Qualification or relegation
1	Espanyol	30	23	5	2	66	10	+56	74	Copa de Campeones
2	Damm	30	19	7	4	52	16	+36	64	Copa del Rey
3	Mallorca	30	17	8	5	53	16	+37	59	
4	FC Barcelona	30	16	8	6	49	25	+24	56	
5	Manacor	30	13	8	9	43	37	+6	47	
6	Gimnàstic de Tarragona	30	12	9	9	33	31	+2	45	
7	Cornellà	30	13	6	11	38	36	+2	45	
8	Real Zaragoza	30	11	6	13	43	40	+3	39	
9	Atlético Baleares	30	9	10	11	31	36	−5	37	
10	San Francisco	30	9	10	11	38	46	−8	37	
11	Stadium Casablanca	30	9	7	14	33	52	−19	34	
12	Lleida Esportiu	30	9	5	16	30	45	−15	32	
13	Badalona	30	8	6	16	35	49	−14	30	Relegated to Liga Nacional
14	Jàbac i Terrassa	30	5	9	16	34	52	−18	24	Relegated to Liga Nacional
15	Mercantil	30	3	9	18	32	74	−42	18	Relegated to Liga Nacional
16	Huesca	30	3	9	18	19	64	−45	18	Relegated to Liga Nacional

=== Group IV ===
Pos	Team	Pld	W	D	L	GF	GA	GD	Pts	Qualification or relegation
1	Málaga	34	24	6	4	89	22	+67	78	Copa de Campeones
2	Sevilla	34	20	11	3	79	14	+65	71	Copa del Rey
3	Cádiz	34	21	6	7	90	41	+49	69	
4	Real Betis	34	19	10	5	92	35	+57	67	
5	Almería	34	19	7	8	79	50	+29	64	
6	Recreativo de Huelva	34	20	3	11	55	28	+27	63	
7	Granada	34	15	11	8	70	44	+26	56	
8	Sevilla Este	34	13	11	10	45	37	+8	50	
9	Séneca	34	13	7	14	48	57	−9	46	
10	Santa Fe	34	12	9	13	52	59	−7	45	
11	26 de Febrero	34	13	6	15	54	54	0	45	
12	San Félix	34	12	9	13	45	42	+3	45	
13	Puerto Malagueño	34	11	9	14	51	65	−14	42	Relegated to Liga Nacional
14	Maracena	34	8	6	20	37	68	−31	30	Relegated to Liga Nacional
15	Atlético Sanluqueño	34	6	5	23	40	78	−38	23	Relegated to Liga Nacional
16	Los Molinos	34	6	4	24	38	83	−45	22	Relegated to Liga Nacional
17	Goyu-Ryu	34	5	5	24	15	86	−71	20	Relegated to Liga Nacional
18	Peña Barcelonista	34	5	3	26	28	144	−116	18	Relegated to Liga Nacional

=== Group V ===
Pos	Team	Pld	W	D	L	GF	GA	GD	Pts	Qualification or relegation
1	Rayo Vallecano	30	25	2	3	78	25	+53	77	Copa de Campeones
2	Real Madrid	30	24	3	3	99	22	+77	75	Copa de Campeones
3	Getafe	30	22	2	6	55	25	+30	68	Copa del Rey
4	Atlético de Madrid	30	18	4	8	68	45	+23	58	
5	Diocesano	30	13	4	13	51	49	+2	43	
6	Real Valladolid	30	11	8	11	44	39	+5	41	
7	RSD Alcalá	30	10	8	12	35	46	−11	38	
8	Leganés	30	10	7	13	38	45	−7	37	
9	Alcorcón	30	10	5	15	45	47	−2	35	
10	Rayo Majadahonda	30	10	5	15	44	64	−20	35	
11	UDC Sur	30	9	8	13	43	51	−8	35	
12	Flecha Negra	30	10	5	15	36	58	−22	35	
13	Unión Adarve	30	10	5	15	30	50	−20	35	Relegated to Liga Nacional
14	Alcobendas	30	7	8	15	39	56	−17	29	Relegated to Liga Nacional
15	Puente Castro	30	5	4	21	27	74	−47	19	Relegated to Liga Nacional
16	Plasencia	30	4	6	20	29	65	−36	18	Relegated to Liga Nacional

=== Group VI ===
Pos	Team	Pld	W	D	L	GF	GA	GD	Pts	Qualification or relegation
1	Las Palmas	30	22	6	2	86	23	+63	72	Copa de Campeones
2	Laguna	30	20	7	3	57	28	+29	67	Copa del Rey
3	Tenerife	30	20	5	5	62	29	+33	65	Copa del Rey
4	Arucas	30	14	6	10	52	44	+8	48	
5	Acodetti	30	11	10	9	60	50	+10	43	
6	Tahíche	30	11	6	13	32	39	−7	39	
7	Sobradillo	30	8	15	7	48	43	+5	39	
8	Juventud Laguna	30	12	3	15	55	63	−8	39	
9	Ofra	30	10	4	16	45	60	−15	34	
10	Telde	30	7	12	11	33	40	−7	33	
11	Huracán	30	8	9	13	43	48	−5	33	
12	Juventud Marítima	30	8	9	13	40	64	−24	33	
13	Victoria	30	10	3	17	47	73	−26	33	Relegated to Liga Nacional
14	Ibarra	30	10	2	18	55	79	−24	32	Relegated to Liga Nacional
15	Tenisca	30	7	9	14	47	58	−11	30	Relegated to Liga Nacional
16	Vecindario	30	8	4	18	42	60	−18	28	Relegated to Liga Nacional

=== Group VII ===
Pos	Team	Pld	W	D	L	GF	GA	GD	Pts	Qualification or relegation
1	Villarreal	30	21	6	3	83	21	+62	69	Copa de Campeones
2	Valencia	30	20	8	2	83	25	+58	68	Copa del Rey
3	Levante	30	17	8	5	51	24	+27	59	
4	Real Murcia	30	14	8	8	33	26	+7	50	
5	Atlético Madrileño	30	12	8	10	39	43	−4	44	
6	Elche	30	10	10	10	42	41	+1	40	
7	Roda	30	11	6	13	47	44	+3	39	
8	Huracán Valencia	30	11	5	14	37	42	−5	38	
9	Cartagena FC	30	11	4	15	39	55	−16	37	
10	Albacete	30	9	10	11	35	46	−11	37	
11	Lorquí	30	10	7	13	49	58	−9	37	
12	Torre Levante	30	8	12	10	30	34	−4	36	
13	Hércules	30	9	3	18	29	64	−35	30	Relegated to Liga Nacional
14	Alboraya	30	7	8	15	42	55	−13	29	Relegated to Liga Nacional
15	Guadalajara	30	6	7	17	37	70	−33	25	Relegated to Liga Nacional
16	Tavernes Blanques	30	6	6	18	29	57	−28	24	Relegated to Liga Nacional

== Copa de Campeones ==
Quarter-finals; 4 May 2015
WC	Real Madrid	3
I	Celta	1
Group A
VI	Las Palmas	0
III	Espanyol	5
IV	Málaga	0
V	Rayo Vallecano	1
Group B
VII	Villarreal	3
II	Real Sociedad	1

Semi-finals; 6 May 2015
WC	Real Madrid	1
III	Espanyol	2
V	Rayo Vallecano	0
VII	Villarreal	1

Final; 9 May 2015
III	Espanyol	2
VII	Villareal CF	3

=== Quarter-finals ===
4 May 2015	Real Madrid	3 – 1	Celta	Almuñécar
10:00	Borja Mayoral 40', 50' (pen.); Borja Sánchez 90+1'	report	Yelko 36'	Stadium: Francisco Bonet; Referee: Tauste Fernández

4 May 2015	Las Palmas	0 – 5	Espanyol	Almuñécar
12:30			Campuzano 22', 57'; Écija 32'; Entrena 42'; Eric Gracia 73'	Stadium: Francisco Bonet; Attendance: 200

4 May 2015	Málaga	0 – 1	Rayo Vallecano	Almuñécar
17:00			Clavería 76'	Stadium: Francisco Bonet; Referee: Ruiz Aguilera

4 May 2015	Villarreal	3 – 1 (a.e.t.)	Real Sociedad	Almuñécar
19:30	Mario 38', 119'; Akale 108'		Calvillo 4'	Stadium: Francisco Bonet; Referee: Bewernick Galayo

=== Semifinals ===
6 May 2015	Real Madrid	1 – 2	Espanyol	Almuñécar
17:00	Lazo 35'	report	Gual 44'; Roca 59'	Stadium: Francisco Bonet; Referee: Artacho Cobo

6 May 2015	Rayo Vallecano	0 – 1	Villarreal	Almuñécar
19:30			Simón 76'	Stadium: Francisco Bonet

=== Final ===
9 May 2015	Espanyol	2 – 3 (a.e.t.)	Villarreal	Almuñécar
19:00	Campuzano 87'; Eric Gracía 90+3'	Report	Mario 3'; Genís 24'; Mathi 117'	Stadium: Francisco Bonet; Attendance: 900; Referee: Benjumea Álvarez

Copa de Campeones
winners
Villarreal CF
1st title

==== Details ====
Espanyol	Villarreal

ESPANYOL:
GK	1	(Angola) Rubén Ualoloca
DF		(Spain) Carles Soria
DF		(Spain) Aarón Martín
DF		(Spain) Iago Indias	(substituted off) 113'
DF		(Spain) Lluís López
MF	6	(Spain) Marc Roca	(substituted off) 78'
MF		(Spain) Óscar Melendo	(substituted off) 105'
FW		(Spain) Víctor Campuzano
FW		(Spain) Juanan Entrena
FW	15	(Spain) Marc Gual	(substituted off) 63'
FW		(Spain) Iván Écija	(substituted off) 68'
Substitutes:
GK	13	(Spain) Jesús Ruiz
DF		(Spain) Erik Sarmiento	(substituted in) 113'
MF		(Spain) Álex López	(substituted in) 68'
MF		(Spain) Patrick	(substituted in) 105'
MF		(Colombia) Yhonathan Bedoya
FW		(Spain) Lauren Egea	(substituted in) 78'
FW		(Spain) Eric Gracía	(substituted in) 63'
Manager: (Spain) David Gallego

VILLARREAL:
GK	(Spain) Ximo Miralles
DF	(Spain) Miguelón
DF	(Spain) Genís	(yellow card) 24' (yellow-red card) 111'
DF	(Argentina) Maximiliano Rosales
DF	(Spain) Javi Jiménez
MF	(Spain) Beli		(substituted off) 63'
MF	(Spain) Rodri Hernández
MF	(Spain) Cassano		(substituted off) 87'
MF	(Spain) Alfonso Pedraza	(yellow card) 74'	(substituted off) 86'
FW	(Spain) Simón		(substituted off) 71'
FW	(Spain) Mario		(substituted off) 81'
Substitutes:
GK	(Spain) Joan Femenías
DF	(Uruguay) Mathias Rodríguez		(substituted in) 87'
DF	(Spain) Roger Escoruela
MF	(Spain) Chuca		(substituted in) 63'
MF	(United States) Mukwelle Akale		(substituted in) 81'
FW	(Paraguay) Pibe		(substituted in) 71'
FW	(Spain) Chepe		(substituted in) 86'
Manager: (Spain) Javier Calleja

== See also ==
- 2008 Copa de Campeones (played between same teams)
- 2015 Copa del Rey Juvenil
