= 2007–08 División de Honor Juvenil de Fútbol =

División de Honor Juvenil de Fútbol
- Season: 2007–08

The 2007–08 División de Honor Juvenil de Fútbol season was the 22nd since its establishment.

== Copa de Campeones ==
=== Group A ===
Team 1	Score	Team 2
Real Sociedad	0–1	Rayo Vallecano
Real Sociedad	3–3	Villarreal CF
Rayo Vallecano	0–3	Villarreal CF

=== Group B ===
==== 1st round ====
Team 1	Score	Team 2
UD Las Palmas	0–1	RCD Espanyol
Deportivo de La Coruña	2–2	Sevilla FC

==== 2nd round ====
Team 1	Score	Team 2
Sevilla FC	0–1	RCD Espanyol

=== Final ===
Team 1	Score	Team 2
Villarreal CF	1–2	RCD Espanyol

Copa de Campeones
winners
RCD Espanyol

==== Details ====
11 May 2008

Villarreal	1 – 2	Espanyol
Chumillas 14'	rfef.es	David 2'; Maxim 84'

Municipal Alberto Ruiz, Colmenar Viejo
Attendance: 2,100

Villarreal	Espanyol

VILLARREAL:
GK	(Spain) Rubén
DF	(Spain) Mario
DF	(Spain) Ángel
DF	(Spain) Eixea
DF	(Spain) R. Soria
MF	(Spain) Luque	(substituted off) 85'
MF	(Spain) Kike	(substituted off) 67'
MF	(Spain) Nico	(substituted off) 88'
FW	(Spain) Ochoa
FW	(Spain) Juanjo	(substituted off) 73'
FW	(Spain) Chumillas
Substitutes:
FW	(Spain) Salva	(substituted in) 67'
MF	(Spain) Poscar	(substituted in) 85'
FW	(Spain) Migue	(substituted in) 88'
MF	(Spain) Gálvez	(substituted in) 73'
Manager:

ESPANYOL:
GK	(Spain) Víctor
DF	(Spain) Oriol	(substituted off) 46'
DF	(Spain) Savall
DF	(Spain) Víctor Ruiz
DF	(Spain) Ricarte
MF	(Spain) Álex
MF	(Spain) David	(substituted off) 88'
MF	(Spain) Raúl Baena
MF	(Spain) Creus	(substituted off) 93'
FW	(Romania) Maxim
FW	(Spain) Chuli	(substituted off) 78'
Substitutes:
DF	(Spain) Canario	(substituted in) 46'
MF	(Spain) Carlos	(substituted in) 88'
MF	(Spain) Sergio	(substituted in) 93'
FW	(Spain) Marc	(substituted in) 78'
Manager:

== See also ==
- 2008 Copa del Rey Juvenil
- 2015 Copa de Campeones (played between same teams)
