= 2013–14 División de Honor Juvenil de Fútbol =

División de Honor Juvenil de Fútbol
- Season: 2013–14

The 2013–14 División de Honor Juvenil de Fútbol season is the 28th since its establishment. The regular season began on September 7, 2013, and ends on April 13, 2014.

== Classification ==
=== Group I ===
Pos	Team	Pld	W	D	L	GF	GA	GD	Pts
1	Racing de Santander	30	21	7	2	76	26	+50	70
2	Celta de Vigo	30	21	4	5	86	27	+59	67
3	Deportivo de La Coruña	30	15	8	7	59	35	+24	53
4	Pabellón Ourense	30	12	7	11	35	38	−3	43
5	Sporting de Gijón	30	11	8	11	56	50	+6	41
6	Llano 2000	30	9	14	7	44	40	+4	41
7	Real Oviedo	30	11	6	13	49	49	0	39
8	Porriño Industrial	30	10	9	11	45	49	−4	39
9	Lugo	30	10	7	13	48	50	−2	37
10	Pontevedra	30	9	8	13	57	72	−15	35
11	Atlético Perines	30	9	8	13	51	55	−4	35
12	Veriña	30	9	8	13	32	49	−17	35
13	Bansander	30	9	8	13	62	70	−8	35
14	Roces	30	9	5	16	30	56	−26	32
15	Areosa	30	8	6	16	46	72	−26	30
16	Cervantes	30	7	7	16	40	78	−38	28

=== Group II ===
Pos	Team	Pld	W	D	L	GF	GA	GD	Pts
1	Real Sociedad	30	22	4	4	82	24	+58	70
2	Huesca	30	19	8	3	61	19	+42	65
3	Danok Bat	30	20	5	5	58	26	+32	65
4	Athletic Bilbao	30	20	4	6	73	32	+41	64
5	Osasuna	30	16	11	3	75	34	+41	59
6	Alavés	30	11	7	12	39	34	+5	40
7	Eibar	30	11	4	15	37	46	−9	37
8	San Juan	30	10	7	13	33	51	−18	37
9	UD Logroñés	30	10	6	14	29	42	−13	36
10	Antiguoko	30	8	11	11	30	36	−6	35
11	Chantrea	30	11	2	17	40	50	−10	35
12	Arenas de Getxo	30	9	7	14	31	45	−14	34
13	Durango	30	8	5	17	28	54	−26	29
14	Getxo	30	7	5	18	34	63	−29	26
15	Berceo	30	7	1	22	21	69	−48	22
16	Oberena	30	5	5	20	23	69	−46	20

=== Group III ===
Pos	Team	Pld	W	D	L	GF	GA	GD	Pts
1	FC Barcelona	30	23	3	4	83	23	+60	72
2	Espanyol	30	19	5	6	76	36	+40	62
3	Mallorca	30	18	3	9	64	42	+22	57
4	Badalona	30	16	7	7	51	37	+14	55
5	Damm	30	16	5	9	53	40	+13	53
6	Jàbac i Terrassa	30	13	10	7	45	36	+9	49
7	Roda	30	14	5	11	48	48	0	47
8	Cornellà	30	13	6	11	55	44	+11	45
9	Gimnàstic de Tarragona	30	11	8	11	41	42	−1	41
10	Real Zaragoza	30	11	4	15	38	50	−12	37
11	Atlético Baleares	30	10	5	15	46	56	−10	35
12	San Francisco	30	9	8	13	40	47	−7	35
13	Europa	30	8	5	17	35	81	−46	29
14	Sant Andreu	30	7	7	16	28	47	−19	28
15	Girona	30	3	7	20	24	51	−27	16
16	Menorca	30	2	6	22	25	72	−47	12

=== Group IV ===
Pos	Team	Pld	W	D	L	GF	GA	GD	Pts
1	Málaga	30	23	4	3	82	21	+61	73
2	Sevilla	30	23	3	4	93	25	+68	72
3	Real Betis	30	16	7	7	59	29	+30	55
4	Cádiz	30	15	8	7	59	33	+26	53
5	Almería	30	14	8	8	52	37	+15	50
6	Granada	30	15	5	10	59	38	+21	50
7	Santa Fe	30	12	8	10	52	45	+7	44
8	Recreativo de Huelva	30	12	8	10	38	42	−4	44
9	Puerto Malagueño	30	11	6	13	32	33	−1	39
10	Los Molinos	30	11	3	16	37	61	−24	36
11	Sevilla Este	30	9	7	14	39	48	−9	34
12	26 de Febrero	30	9	7	14	46	52	−6	34
13	Xerez	30	7	8	15	40	64	−24	29
14	Gimnástico de Melilla	30	7	5	18	34	84	−50	26
15	Coria	30	6	5	19	34	66	−32	23
16	Taraguilla	30	3	2	25	26	104	−78	11

=== Group V ===
Pos	Team	Pld	W	D	L	GF	GA	GD	Pts
1	Real Madrid	30	27	2	1	93	14	+79	83
2	Atlético de Madrid	30	23	1	6	104	36	+68	70
3	Getafe	30	19	6	5	67	28	+39	63
4	Rayo Vallecano	30	18	7	5	72	37	+35	61
5	Diocesano	30	18	5	7	59	26	+33	59
6	Real Valladolid	30	14	7	9	64	41	+23	49
7	Unión Adarve	30	13	3	14	50	52	−2	42
8	Plasencia	30	10	5	15	35	57	−22	35
9	Leganés	30	10	5	15	42	53	−11	35
10	Rayo Majadahonda	30	9	7	14	38	50	−12	34
11	Alcorcón	30	9	7	14	34	45	−11	34
12	Puente Castro	30	10	4	16	47	74	−27	34
13	Santa Ana	30	10	3	17	41	55	−14	33
14	San Fernando	30	8	3	19	36	62	−26	27
15	Don Bosco	30	5	6	19	42	67	−25	21
16	Talavera	30	1	1	28	17	144	−127	4

=== Group VI ===
Pos	Team	Pld	W	D	L	GF	GA	GD	Pts
1	Las Palmas	30	26	4	0	91	15	+76	82
2	Tenerife	30	18	6	6	65	21	+44	60
3	Arucas	30	17	3	10	63	40	+23	54
4	Tahíche	30	15	3	12	51	50	+1	48
5	Acodetti	30	13	7	10	39	33	+6	46
6	Vecindario	30	12	7	11	41	40	+1	43
7	Sobradillo	30	11	6	13	51	60	−9	39
8	Ofra	30	10	7	13	35	44	−9	37
9	Telde	30	10	7	13	43	56	−13	37
10	Tenisca	30	10	7	13	41	58	−17	37
11	Huracán	30	10	6	14	46	57	−11	36
12	Laguna de Tenerife	30	9	8	13	42	43	−1	35
13	Puerto de la Cruz	30	8	11	11	30	47	−17	35
14	Unión Viera	30	8	5	17	29	46	−17	29
15	Mensajero	30	7	6	17	31	57	−26	27
16	Estrella	30	7	5	18	33	64	−31	26

=== Group VII ===
Pos	Team	Pld	W	D	L	GF	GA	GD	Pts
1	Valencia	30	20	6	4	66	17	+49	66
2	Levante	30	17	8	5	53	26	+27	59
3	Villarreal	30	17	5	8	59	36	+23	56
4	Atlético Madrileño	30	16	6	8	44	28	+16	54
5	Real Murcia	30	14	6	10	52	40	+12	48
6	Huracán Valencia	30	12	9	9	33	31	+2	45
7	Elche	30	12	7	11	47	42	+5	43
8	Numancia	30	11	6	13	45	55	−10	39
9	Torre Levante	30	9	10	11	34	41	−7	37
10	Albacete	30	9	9	12	40	46	−6	36
11	Tavernes Blanques	30	9	9	12	32	41	−9	36
12	Cartagena FC	30	9	8	13	32	48	−16	35
13	Alcoyano	30	10	5	15	40	47	−7	35
14	Castellón	30	9	5	16	33	53	−20	32
15	Alicante	30	5	8	17	22	58	−36	23
16	Ciudad Real	30	5	5	20	25	48	−23	20

== Copa de Campeones ==
Quarter-finals; 5 May 2014
I	Racing Santander	4
VII	Valencia	2
Group A
III	Barcelona	2
V	Real Madrid	4
IV	Málaga	2
WC	Sevilla	1
Group B
VI	Las Palmas	0
II	Real Sociedad	1

Semi-finals; 7 May 2014
I	Racing Santander	4
V	Real Madrid	6
IV	Málaga	1
II	Real Sociedad	2

Final; 10 May 2014
V	Real Madrid	1(7)
II	Real Sociedad	1(6)

=== Quarter-finals ===
5 May 2014	Racing Santander	4 – 2	Valencia	Vera
10:30	Prada 15'; Concha 48' (pen.), 90+3'; Somavilla 51'		Domingo 21'; Toni Lato 89'	Stadium: Municipal; Referee: Gómez Peláez

5 May 2014	Barcelona	2 – 4	Real Madrid	Vera
12:45	Traoré 69'; Corredera 90'		Legaz 13', 36'; Javi Muñoz 47', 71'	Stadium: Municipal; Referee: Sánchez Villalobos

5 May 2014	Málaga	2 – 1	Sevilla	Vera
17:00	Álex Sánchez 51'; Gallar 82'		Matos 90+4'	Stadium: Municipal; Referee: Reyes Estévez

5 May 2014	Las Palmas	0 – 1	Real Sociedad	Vera
19:30			Ugarte 39'	Stadium: Municipal; Referee: Borja Belmonte

=== Semifinals ===
7 May 2014	Racing Santander	4 – 6	Real Madrid	Vera
17:00	Jony 4'; Rubén Sánchez 52', 62'; Gándara 85'		Javi Muñoz 2', 28'; Álvaro Guerrero 39'; Legaz 55'; Agoney 74', 88'	Stadium: Municipal; Referee: Yáñez Mejias

7 May 2014	Málaga	1 – 2	Real Sociedad	Vera
19:30	Fornals 21'		Guridi 74', 90+2'	Stadium: Municipal; Referee: Ruiz Aguilera

=== Final ===
10 May 2014	Real Madrid	1 – 1 (a.e.t.) (7 – 6 p)	Real Sociedad	Vera
19:00	Legaz 64' (pen.)	Report	Lapeña 21'	Stadium: Municipal; Referee: David Fernández Borbalán
	Penalties
	Legaz (penalty scored); Miki (penalty scored); Cedrés (penalty scored); Álvaro Guerrero (penalty scored); Enzo Zidane (penalty scored); Hermoso (penalty missed); Javi Muñoz (penalty scored); Fran (penalty scored)		(penalty scored) Olabe; (penalty scored) Capilla; (penalty scored) Olaizola; (penalty scored) Ugarte; (penalty scored) Odriozola; (penalty missed) Ibarbia; (penalty scored) Arrieta; (penalty missed) Guridi

Copa de Campeones
winners
Real Madrid CF

==== Details ====
Real Madrid	Real Sociedad

REAL MADRID:
GK	1	(Spain) Caba
DF	2	(Spain) Fran
DF	4	(Spain) Jaime Sánchez	(substituted off) 67'
DF	5	(Spain) José León (c)
DF	3	(Spain) Mario Hermoso
MF	6	(Spain) Marcos Llorente	(substituted off) 106'
MF	8	(Spain) Aleix Febas	(substituted off) 59'
MF	7	(Spain) Álvaro Guerrero
MF	10	(Spain) Javi Muñoz
FW	11	(Spain) Agoney	(substituted off) 59'
FW	18	(Spain) Legaz
Substitutes:
GK	13	(Spain) Álex Craninx
DF	12	(Spain) Iván Sáez
DF	14	(Spain) Héctor Martínez	(substituted in) 67'
MF	15	(Spain) Miki	(substituted in) 106'
MF	16	(Spain) Cristian Cedrés	(substituted in) 59'
MF	17	(France) Enzo Zidane	(substituted in) 59'
FW	9	(Spain) Isma Cerro	Sent to blood bin
Manager: (Spain) Luis Miguel Ramis

REAL SOCIEDAD:
GK	(Spain) Estanislao Marcellán
DF	(Spain) Xabier Prieto	(substituted off) 57'
DF	(Spain) Andoni Ugarte
DF	(Spain) Adrián Lapeña
DF	(Spain) Andoni Gorosabel
MF	(Spain) Jon Guridi
MF	(Spain) Eneko Capilla
MF	(Spain) Luca Sangalli	(substituted off) 83'
MF	(Spain) Martín Merquelanz	(substituted off) 62'
MF	(Spain) Imanol Sarriegi	(substituted off) 54'
FW	(Spain) Jon Bautista	(substituted off) 73'
Substitutes:
GK	(Spain) Ignacio Otaño
DF	(Spain) Josu Ibarbia	(substituted in) 57'
DF	(Spain) Álvaro Odriozola	(substituted in) 83'
DF	(Spain) Odei Arrieta	(substituted in) 62'
MF	(Spain) Roberto Olabe	(substituted in) 54'
FW	(Spain) Iker Olaizola	(substituted in) 73'
FW	(Spain) Unai Manso
Manager: (Spain) Jon Mikel Arrieta

== See also ==
- 2014 Copa del Rey Juvenil
