= 2001 Copa del Rey Juvenil =

Tournament details
- Country: Spain
- Teams: 16

Final positions
- Champions: Espanyol
- Runners-up: Real Madrid

Tournament statistics
- Matches played: 29
- Goals scored: 77 (2.66 per match)

The 2001 Copa del Rey Juvenil was the 51st staging of the Copa del Rey Juvenil de Fútbol tournament. The competition began on May 13, 2001 and ended on June 24, 2001 with the final.

== First round ==
Team 1	Agg.	Team 2	1st leg	2nd leg
Osasuna	2–1	Celta de Vigo	0–0	2–1
Tenerife	1–1 (a)	Rayo Vallecano	0–0	1–1
Goyu-Ryu	1–2	Real Madrid	0–0	1–2
FC Barcelona	2–3	Zaragoza	2–2	0–1
Deportivo	0–4	Athletic Bilbao	0–2	0–2
Mallorca	1–2	Kelme	1–0	0–2
Betis	6–4	Atlético Madrid	3–1	3–3
Valladolid	1–6	Espanyol	1–1	0–5

== Quarterfinals ==
Team 1	Agg.	Team 2	1st leg	2nd leg
Betis	1–5	Real Madrid	0–3	1–2
Zaragoza	2–3	Espanyol	1–1	1–2
Osasuna	4–3	Kelme	3–2	1–1
Athletic Bilbao	3–4	Tenerife	2–1	1–3

== Semifinals ==
Team 1	Agg.	Team 2	1st leg	2nd leg
Espanyol	5–4	Tenerife	3–2	2–2
Osasuna	1–3	Real Madrid	1–2	0–1

== Final ==
24 June 2001
20:00

Espanyol	2–0	Real Madrid
May 51' (pen.); Soriano 74'	Report

Antonio Amilivia, León
Attendance: 2,000
Referee: Turienzo Álvarez

Espanyol:
GK	1	(Spain) Manel Martínez
DF	2	(Spain) Marc Bertrán
DF	3	(Spain) Daniel Jarque
DF	4	(Spain) Carlos García
DF	5	(Spain) Miguel Hernández (yellow card) 90'
MF	6	(Spain) May (substituted off) 54'
MF	7	(Equatorial Guinea) Jacinto Elá (yellow card) 47' (substituted off) 85'
MF	8	(Spain) Jaume Delgado (yellow card) 42' (substituted off) 56'
FW	9	(Spain) Javi (substituted off) 67'
FW	10	(Spain) Albert Crusat
MF	11	(Spain) Juan Carlos Ceballos
Substitutes:
MF	12	(Spain) Sisco Cabello (substituted on) 54'
GK	13	(Spain) David Pociello
MF	14	(Spain) Israel (substituted on) 56'
MF	15	(Spain) Marc Francolí (substituted on) 85'
FW	16	(Spain) Jonathan Soriano (substituted on) 67'
Manager:
(Spain) Tintín Márquez

Real Madrid:
GK	1	(Spain) Jordi Codina
DF	2	(Spain) Juan Carlos Duque
DF	3	(Spain) Álvaro Mejía
DF	4	(Spain) Berna
DF	5	(Spain) Rubén González (substituted off) 85'
MF	6	(Spain) José Luis Cabrera
MF	7	(Spain) Ángel Sánchez (substituted off) 68'
MF	8	(Spain) Ángel Robles (substituted off) 53'
MF	9	(Spain) Borja Ferrer
FW	10	(Spain) Adrián Quintairos (substituted off) 77'
FW	11	(Spain) Javier Portillo
Substitutes:
MF	12	(Spain) Ulises Montenegro (substituted on) 53'
GK	13	(Spain) Antonio Reguero
MF	14	(Spain) Álvaro Zazo (substituted on) 77'
MF	15	(Spain) David Royo (substituted on) 68'
MF	16	(Spain) Maíllo (substituted on) 85'
Manager:
(Spain) Luis Miguel Martínez

Copa del Generalísimo
Winners
Espanyol

== See also ==
- 2022 Copa del Rey Juvenil (final played between same clubs)
