= 2003 Copa del Rey Juvenil =

Tournament details
- Country: Spain
- Teams: 16

Final positions
- Champions: Espanyol
- Runners-up: Mallorca

Tournament statistics
- Matches played: 29
- Goals scored: 94 (3.24 per match)

The 2003 Copa del Rey Juvenil was the 53rd staging of the tournament. The competition began on May 18, 2003, and ended on June 29, 2003, with the final.

== First round ==
Team 1	Agg.	Team 2	1st leg	2nd leg
Málaga	1–7	Espanyol	1–2	0–5
Osasuna	5–2	Valladolid	5–1	0–1
Athletic Bilbao	6–2	Salamanca	3–2	3–0
Zaragoza	2–4	Oviedo	0–1	2–3
Betis	2–4	Valencia	0–1	2–3
Murcia	4–6	Sevilla	3–2	1–4
Leganés	5–2	Las Palmas	0–0	5–2
Atlético Madrid	0–4	Mallorca	0–1	0–3

== Quarterfinals ==
Team 1	Agg.	Team 2	1st leg	2nd leg
Oviedo	0–5	Espanyol	0–1	0–4
Osasuna	0–1	Mallorca	0–1	0–0
Sevilla	1–7	Valencia	0–3	1–4
Athletic Bilbao	8–1	Leganés	3–0	5–1

== Semifinals ==
Team 1	Agg.	Team 2	1st leg	2nd leg
Espanyol	3–2	Valencia	0–1	3–1
Mallorca	3–3 (a)	Athletic Bilbao	0–1	3–2

== Final ==
29 June 2003
12:00

Espanyol	3–1	Mallorca
Siscu 57'; Valladar 114', 120'	Report	Javi Moreno 33'

El Toralín, Ponferrada
Attendance: 2,000
Referee: González González

Espanyol:
GK	(Spain) Tato Burgada
DF	(Spain) Toni Lao
DF	(Spain) Carlos García
DF	(Spain) Albert Serrán (substituted off) 113'
DF	(Spain) Javi Chica
MF	(Spain) Enric Maureta
MF	(Spain) Joan Tomàs (yellow card) 83' (substituted off) 120'
MF	(Spain) Héctor Simón
FW	(Spain) Albert Yagüe (substituted off) 115'
FW	(Spain) Siscu Cabello
MF	(Spain) Iray Barreto (substituted off) 55'
Substitutes:
FW	(Spain) Luis Valladar (substituted in) 55'
MF	(Spain) Pablo Rey-Cabarcos (substituted in) 113'
MF	(Spain) Miki Martínez (substituted in) 115'
DF	(Spain) Miquel Robusté (substituted in) 120'
Manager:
(Spain) Ángel Pedraza

Mallorca:
GK	(Spain) Miguel Ángel Moyà
DF	(Peru) Iván Merino
DF	(Spain) Abel Moreno
DF	(Spain) Iván Ramis (substituted off) 111'
DF	(Spain) José Rodríguez
MF	(Spain) Javi Moreno
MF	(Spain) Xisco Cladera
MF	(Spain) César Collado (substituted off) 111'
FW	(Spain) Víctor Casadesús
MF	(Spain) Andrés (substituted off) 68'
FW	(Spain) Chus Seco (substituted off) 63'
Substitutes:
FW	(Spain) Guillem Bauzà (substituted in) 63'
FW	(Spain) Raúl (substituted in) 68'
DF	(Spain) Baltasar Rigo (substituted in) 111'
MF	(Spain) Babiloni (substituted in) 111'
Manager:
(Spain) Toni Cazorla

Copa del Generalísimo
Winners
Espanyol

== See also ==
- 2024 Copa del Rey Juvenil (final played between same teams)
