= 2010–11 División de Honor Juvenil de Fútbol =

División de Honor Juvenil de Fútbol
- Season: 2010–11
- Champions: Barcelona

The 2010–11 División de Honor Juvenil de Fútbol season was the 25th since its establishment. Barcelona was the champion.

== Regular season ==
=== Group 1 ===
Pos	Team	Pld	W	D	L	GF	GA	GD	Pts	Qualification or relegation
1	Racing Santander	30	23	3	4	64	19	+45	72	Copa de Campeones
2	Celta Vigo	30	22	2	6	70	28	+42	68	Copa del Rey
3	Deportivo La Coruña	30	20	4	6	75	30	+45	64	Copa del Rey
4	Sporting de Gijón	30	17	8	5	51	30	+21	59	
5	Roces	30	16	6	8	61	45	+16	54	
6	Atlético Perines	30	13	3	14	58	66	−8	42	
7	Gimnástica Torrelavega	30	10	7	13	40	55	−15	37	
8	Puente Castro FC	30	10	7	13	44	50	−6	37	
9	Pontevedra	30	9	8	13	30	45	−15	35	
10	CD Conxo	30	10	5	15	38	58	−20	35	
11	Racing Ferrol	30	9	7	14	46	55	−9	34	
12	Club Bansander	30	8	9	13	37	46	−9	33	
13	Montañeros	30	9	5	16	32	43	−11	32	Relegation
14	Calansancio	30	7	6	17	33	55	−22	27	Relegation
15	Rápido de Bouzas	30	6	6	18	29	56	−27	24	Relegation
16	Gimnástico Alcázar	30	5	6	19	28	55	−27	21	Relegation

=== Group 2 ===
Pos	Team	Pld	W	D	L	GF	GA	GD	Pts	Qualification or relegation
1	Athletic Bilbao	30	23	4	3	77	27	+50	73	Copa de Campeones
2	Real Sociedad	30	22	5	3	61	14	+47	71	Copa del Rey
3	Osasuna	30	21	5	4	55	22	+33	68	Copa del Rey
4	Alavés	30	15	9	6	42	29	+13	54	
5	Burgos Promesas 2000	30	10	13	7	46	32	+14	43	
6	Eibar	30	10	11	9	39	37	+2	41	
7	Berceo	30	11	4	15	49	60	−11	37	
8	Danok Bat CF	30	11	4	15	31	42	−11	37	
9	Chantrea	30	10	6	14	33	41	−8	36	
10	Leioa	30	10	6	14	29	37	−8	36	
11	Santutxu	30	9	6	15	33	51	−18	33	
12	Barakaldo	30	8	9	13	28	49	−21	33	
13	Logroñés	30	7	11	12	34	46	−12	32	Relegation
14	San Juan	30	8	6	16	36	53	−17	30	Relegation
15	Antiguoko	30	5	7	18	33	57	−24	22	Relegation
16	Lagunak	30	3	8	19	24	53	−29	17	Relegation

=== Group 3 ===
Pos	Team	Pld	W	D	L	GF	GA	GD	Pts	Qualification or relegation
1	Barcelona	30	21	8	1	83	22	+61	71	Copa de Campeones
2	Espanyol	30	22	5	3	75	22	+53	71	Copa del Rey
3	Mallorca	30	20	4	6	66	28	+38	64	
4	CF Damm	30	17	4	9	59	36	+23	55	
5	Cornellà	30	13	9	8	51	40	+11	48	
6	Lleida	30	12	9	9	46	39	+7	45	
7	Badalona	30	11	7	12	50	43	+7	40	
8	Gimnàstic de Tarragona	30	9	9	12	33	48	−15	36	
9	Manlleu	30	9	8	13	52	68	−16	35	
10	Huesca	30	10	4	16	35	63	−28	34	
11	Girona	30	9	6	15	36	49	−13	33	
12	CD San Francisco	30	8	9	13	26	39	−13	33	
13	Juventut Sallista	30	8	7	15	36	61	−25	31	Relegation
14	L'Hospitalet	30	8	7	15	41	57	−16	31	Relegation
15	Gramenet	30	7	2	21	35	69	−34	23	Relegation
16	Poblense	30	4	6	20	33	73	−40	18	Relegation

=== Group 4 ===
Pos	Team	Pld	W	D	L	GF	GA	GD	Pts	Qualification or relegation
1	Sevilla	30	19	4	7	80	38	+42	61	Copa de Campeones
2	Córdoba	30	18	7	5	61	32	+29	61	Copa del Rey
3	Málaga	30	17	4	9	60	36	+24	55	
4	Real Betis	30	15	8	7	50	29	+21	53	
5	Almería	30	16	1	13	51	31	+20	49	
6	Coria	30	13	9	8	35	33	+2	48	
7	Cádiz	30	13	8	9	43	37	+6	47	
8	UD DH San Andrés	30	13	4	13	45	52	−7	43	
9	Goyu-Ryu	30	12	6	12	47	48	−1	42	
10	Recreativo Huelva	30	12	6	12	36	36	0	42	
11	Santa Fe	30	11	7	12	49	50	−1	40	
12	Puerto Malagueño GI	30	12	4	14	46	45	+1	40	
13	Xerez	30	11	3	16	60	64	−4	36	Relegation
14	CD Siempre Alegre	30	7	6	17	33	72	−39	27	Relegation
15	Real Jaén	30	5	4	21	20	64	−44	19	Relegation
16	CP Ejido	30	4	3	23	36	85	−49	12 (Note: 3 points deducted?)	Relegation

=== Group 5 ===
Pos	Team	Pld	W	D	L	GF	GA	GD	Pts	Qualification or relegation
1	Real Madrid	30	26	1	3	90	25	+65	79	Copa de Campeones
2	Rayo Vallecano	30	21	6	3	89	29	+60	69	Copa del Rey
3	Real Valladolid	30	19	5	6	52	21	+31	62	
4	Leganés	30	17	6	7	65	46	+19	57	
5	Getafe	30	13	7	10	56	45	+11	46	
6	Numancia	30	11	8	11	45	48	−3	41	
7	Salamanca	30	13	2	15	44	59	−15	41	
8	Las Rozas	30	10	8	12	35	49	−14	38	
9	Atlético Madrid	30	11	4	15	47	44	+3	37	
10	Atlético Madrileño	30	9	10	11	47	52	−5	37	
11	Rayo Majadahonda	30	10	7	13	30	38	−8	37	
12	Unión Adarve	30	9	8	13	47	62	−15	35	
13	Cacereño	30	9	8	13	43	50	−7	35	Relegation
14	Toledo	30	8	6	16	44	57	−13	30	Relegation
15	Alcorcón	30	4	5	21	25	70	−45	17	Relegation
16	CP Flecha Negra	30	3	3	24	31	95	−64	12	Relegation

=== Group 6 ===
Pos	Team	Pld	W	D	L	GF	GA	GD	Pts	Qualification or relegation
1	Las Palmas	34	29	2	3	100	23	+77	89	Copa de Campeones
2	Tenerife	34	20	8	6	81	29	+52	68	Copa del Rey
3	Vecindario	34	20	3	11	74	47	+27	63	
4	SD San José	34	18	7	9	89	52	+37	61	
5	Universidad LPGC CF	34	16	6	12	64	48	+16	54	
6	CD Puerto Cruz	34	16	4	14	58	52	+6	52	
7	Laguna	34	15	7	12	52	55	−3	52	
8	Huracán	34	14	8	12	57	48	+9	50	
9	CD Sobradillo	34	15	6	13	56	49	+7	48 (Note: 3 points deducted?)	
10	Puertos Las Palmas CEF	34	15	3	16	45	57	−12	48	
11	CD Herbania	34	14	5	15	48	55	−7	47	
12	CD Teguise	34	14	4	16	44	55	−11	46	
13	CD Vallinámar	34	12	8	14	63	64	−1	44	
14	UD Atalaya	34	13	5	16	46	60	−14	44	Relegation
15	Acodetti CF	34	11	7	16	57	66	−9	40	Relegation
16	CD San Andrés	34	9	7	18	60	62	−2	34	Relegation
17	Real Unión de Tenerife	34	4	4	26	31	99	−68	16	Relegation
18	UD Icodense	34	1	6	27	25	129	−104	9	Relegation

=== Group 7 ===
Pos	Team	Pld	W	D	L	GF	GA	GD	Pts	Qualification or relegation
1	Villarreal	30	22	4	4	84	30	+54	70	Copa de Campeones
2	Valencia	30	21	2	7	68	28	+40	65	Copa del Rey
3	Albacete	30	15	5	10	58	42	+16	50	
4	CF Torre Levante	30	14	6	10	51	45	+6	48	
5	Real Zaragoza	30	12	10	8	49	33	+16	46	
6	CD Roda	30	13	6	11	49	47	+2	45	
7	Torrellano Illice	30	12	7	11	41	44	−3	43	
8	Levante	30	13	3	14	40	40	0	42	
9	CF Crack´s	30	11	7	12	32	36	−4	40	
10	Real Murcia	30	11	6	13	33	47	−14	39	
11	Castellón	30	11	4	15	53	55	−2	37	
12	Hércules	30	10	6	14	42	51	−9	36	
13	UD Montecarlo	30	10	3	17	28	57	−29	33	Relegation
14	Elche	30	7	7	16	26	39	−13	28	Relegation
15	Alicante	30	7	7	16	38	71	−33	28	Relegation
16	CD Dolorense	30	7	5	18	43	70	−27	26	Relegation

== Copa de Campeones ==
=== Group A ===
==== Table ====
Pos	Team	Pld	Pts
1	Barcelona	2	4
2	Las Palmas	2	2
3	Sevilla	2	1

Updated to match(es) played on unknown. Source:

==== Results ====
Team 1	Score	Team 2
Sevilla	0–1	Barcelona
Sevilla	0–0	Las Palmas
Barcelona	1–1	Las Palmas

=== Group B ===
==== 1st round ====
Team 1	Score	Team 2
Real Madrid	5–1	Villarreal
Athletic Bilbao	2–4 (aet)	Racing Santander

==== 2nd round ====
Team 1	Score	Team 2
Real Madrid	1–0	Racing Santander

=== Final ===
Team 1	Score	Team 2
Barcelona	3–1	Real Madrid

Copa de Campeones
winners
Barcelona

==== Details ====
7 May 2011
20:00

Barcelona	3 – 1	Real Madrid
Rafinha 8', 24'; Cornejo 61'	rfef.es	Sol 91'

Municipal de Lepe, Lepe
Attendance: 1,500
Referee: José Luis Munuera Montero

Barcelona	Real Madrid

BARCELONA:
GK	(Spain) Carlos
DF	(Spain) Iván Balliu
DF	(Spain) Sergi Gómez
DF	(Spain) Ayala
DF	(Spain) Edu
MF	(Portugal) Luís Gustavo
MF	(Spain) Javier Espinosa	(substituted off) 87'
MF	(Spain) Jordi Masó
FW	(Spain) Ernesto Cornejo	(substituted off) 68'
FW	(Spain) Rafinha	(substituted off) 80'
FW	(Spain) Gerard Deulofeu
Substitutes:
FW	(Spain) Cristian		(substituted in) 68'
MF	(Spain) Pol Calvet		(substituted in) 80'
FW	(Cameroon) Jean Marie Dongou		(substituted in) 87'
Manager:
(Spain) Óscar García

REAL MADRID:
GK	(Spain) Fernando Pacheco
DF	(Spain) Álex	(substituted off) 80'
DF	(Spain) Iván Sáez	(substituted off) 73'
DF	(Spain) Derik
DF	(Spain) Edu Payá
MF	(Spain) Kamal (c)
MF	(Spain) Barril	(substituted off) 46'
MF	(Spain) Omar Mascarell
MF	(Spain) Jesé
FW	(Spain) Sergio Aguza
FW	(Spain) Rubén Sobrino	(substituted off) 58'
Substitutes:
DF	(Spain) Parla	(substituted in) 80'
MF	(Spain) Juanfran	(substituted in) 73'
MF	(Equatorial Guinea) Rubén Belima	(substituted in) 46'
FW	(Spain) Fran Sol	(substituted in) 58'
Manager:
(Spain) Tristán Celador

== See also ==
- 2011 Copa del Rey Juvenil
