= CF Damm =

Association football club in Spain

Damm
- Full name: Club de Futbol Damm
- Nickname: Cervesers
- Founded: 1954; 72 years ago
- Ground: Ciutat Esportiva Damm
- Capacity: 550
- President: Ramon Agenjo
- Coach: Men’s team: Joan Verdú / Women’s team: Oriol Nieto
- League: Men’s team: Divisió d’Honor Juvenil / Women’s team: Preferent Femenina Juvenil
- Website: www.cfdamm.cat
Home colours	Away colours	Third colours

Club de Futbol Damm is a Spanish football team based in Barcelona, in the autonomous community of Catalonia. Founded in 1954, it is dedicated to youth football.

Their Juvenil A squad play in the Group III of the División de Honor Juvenil de Fútbol. The club is mainly known for their successful youth setup, which helps players to develop and join other senior clubs in the region.

== Season to season (Juvenil A) ==
=== Superliga / Liga de Honor sub-19 ===
Seasons with two or more trophies shown in bold

: :Season: :	Level	Group	Position	Copa del Rey Juvenil	Notes
1986–87	1		10th	Round of 16	
1987–88	1		16th	Round of 16	Relegated
1988–89	2	4	1st	N/A	Promoted
1989–90	1		12th	Round of 16	
1990–91	1		11th	Quarter-final	
1991–92	1		6th	Quarter-final	
1992–93	1		10th	Quarter-final	
1993–94	1		10th	Round of 16	
1994–95	1		4th	Semi-final	

=== División de Honor Juvenil ===
Seasons with two or more trophies shown in bold

*Season*	Level	Group	Position	Copa del Rey Juv.	Copa de Campeones	Europe/notes
1995–96	1	3	4th	N/A	N/A	—N/a
1996–97	1	3	5th	N/A	N/A	—N/a
1997–98	1	3	9th	N/A	N/A	—N/a
1998–99	1	3	7th	N/A	N/A	—N/a
1999–00	1	3	7th	N/A	N/A	—N/a
2000–01	1	3	11th	N/A	N/A	—N/a
2001–02	1	3	10th	N/A	N/A	—N/a
2002–03	1	3	10th	N/A	N/A	—N/a
2003–04	1	3	7th	N/A	N/A	—N/a
2004–05	1	3	5th	N/A	N/A	—N/a
2005–06	1	3	8th	N/A	N/A	—N/a
2006–07	1	3	3rd	N/A	N/A	—N/a
2007–08	1	7	8th	N/A	N/A	—N/a
2008–09	1	3	7th	N/A	N/A	—N/a
2009–10	1	3	9th	N/A	N/A	—N/a
2010–11	1	3	4th	N/A	N/A	—N/a
2011–12	1	3	11th	N/A	N/A	N/A
2012–13	1	3	10th	N/A	N/A	N/A
2013–14	1	III	5th	N/A	N/A	N/A
2014–15	1	III	2nd	Quarter-final	N/A	N/A
2015–16	1	III	3rd	N/A	N/A	N/A
2016–17	1	III	5th	N/A	N/A	N/A
2017–18	1	III	14th	N/A	N/A	N/A
2018–19	2	VII	3rd	N/A	N/A	N/A
2019–20 (Note: In March 2020, all fixtures were suspended due to the COVID-19 pandemic in Spain. On 6 May 2020, the Royal Spanish Football Federation announced the premature end of the leagues, revoking all relegations, declaring each divisional leader as champion and cancelling the Copa del Rey Juvenil and the Copa de Campeones for the season.)	1	III	7th	N/A	N/A	N/A
2020–21	1	III-A/C	5th/7th	N/A (Note: Copa del Rey Juvenil not held in 2020–21.)	N/A	N/A (Note: UEFA Youth League not held in 2020–21.)
2021–22	1	III	3rd	Round of 16	N/A	N/A
2022–23	1	III	4th	Round of 32	N/A	N/A
2023–24	1	III	6th	Round of 32	N/A	N/A
2024–25	1	III	2nd	Round of 16	N/A	N/A

== Famous players ==
Note: List consists of players who appeared in La Liga or reached international status.

- (Andorra) Antoni Lima
- (Andorra) Ildefons Lima
- (Equatorial Guinea) Anselmo Eyegue
- (Senegal) Keita Baldé
- (Spain) Aleix Vidal
- (Spain) Álvaro Vázquez
- (Spain) Andrea Orlandi
- (Spain) Carlos Peña
- (Spain) Carles Pérez
- (Spain) Cristian Tello
- (Spain) Cristóbal Parralo
- (Spain) Curro Torres
- (Spain) Dani García
- (Spain) David López
- (Spain) Gerard Moreno
- (Spain) Isaac Cuenca
- (Spain) Isaías Sánchez
- (Spain) Jordi Codina
- (Spain) Joaquín Valerio
- (Spain) Marc Casadó
- (Spain) Joan García
- (Spain) Marc Navarro
- (Spain) Paco Herrera
- (Spain) Rafa Jordà
- (Spain) Ramón de Quintana
- (Spain) Ramón Ros
- (Spain) Sergio García
- (Spain) Toni Velamazán
- (Spain) Víctor Gómez
- (Spain) Víctor Muñoz
- (Spain) Víctor Vázquez
- (Morocco) Mohamed Ezzarfani
- (United States) Konrad de la Fuente
