= Valencia CF (youth) =

Valencia Juvenil
- Full name: Valencia Club de Fútbol Juvenil
- Nickname(s): Los Che; Els Taronges (The Oranges); Los Murciélagos (The Bats)
- Ground: Ciudad Deportiva de Paterna, Paterna, Valencia, Spain
- Capacity: 4,000
- Owner: Peter Lim
- Coach: Paco Cuenca
- League: División de Honor
- 2018-19: División de Honor, Gr. 7, 3rd
- Website: http://www.valenciacf.com/escuelas/plantillas/42641/futbol-11.html?temporada=2015
Home colours	Away colours	Third colours

Valencia Club de Futbol Juvenil are the under-19 team of Spanish professional football club Valencia. They play in the Group VII of the División de Honor Juvenil de Fútbol where their main rivals are Villarreal and Levante.

They also participate in the national Copa de Campeones Juvenil and the Copa del Rey Juvenil, qualification for which is dependent on final league group position, and have taken part in the continental UEFA Youth League.

== Juvenil A ==
=== Current squad ===
As of 5 February 2024

Note: Flags indicate national team as defined under FIFA eligibility rules; some limited exceptions apply. Players may hold more than one non-FIFA nationality.

No.	Pos.	Nation	Player
—	GK	ESP	Raúl Jiménez
—	GK	ESP	Juanda Terrádez
—	GK	ESP	Vicent Abril
—	DF	ESP	Alejandro Panach
—	DF	ESP	Mark Chust
—	DF	ESP	Jan Montes
—	DF	ESP	David Martínez
—	DF	ARM	Andranik Hakobyan
—	MF	ESP	Lucas Núñez

No.	Pos.	Nation	Player
—	MF	ESP	Alejandro Bueso
—	FW	ESP	Pablo López
—	FW	ESP	Marc Jurado
—	FW	ESP	Dani Sánchez
—	FW	ESP	Pablo Reyes
—	FW	USA	Rodrigo Neri
—	FW	ESP	Hugo de Mateo
—	FW	ESP	Marc Palomero

== Season to season (Juvenil A) ==
=== Superliga / Liga de Honor sub-19 ===
Seasons with two or more trophies shown in bold

: :Season: :	Level	Group	Position	Copa del Rey Juvenil	Notes
1986–87	2	3	2nd	N/A	
1987–88	2	5	2nd	N/A	Promoted via play-off
1988–89	1		10th	Round of 16	
1989–90	1		4th	Quarter-final	
1990–91	1		8th	Round of 16	
1991–92	1		7th	Round of 16	
1992–93	1		5th	Quarter-final	
1993–94	1		2nd	Quarter-final	
1994–95	1		7th	Round of 16	

=== División de Honor Juvenil de Fútbol ===
Seasons with two or more trophies shown in bold

*Season*	Level	Group	Position	Copa del Rey Juv.	Copa de Campeones	Europe/notes
1995–96	1	3	1st	Round of 16	3nd in group of 3	—
1996–97	1	3	4th	N/A	N/A	—
1997–98	1	3	1st	Round of 16	Runners-up	—
1998–99	1	3	3rd	Quarter-final	N/A	—
1999–00	1	3	4th	N/A	N/A	—
2000–01	1	3	4th	N/A	N/A	—
2001–02	1	3	6th	N/A	N/A	—
2002–03	1	3	2nd	Semi-final	N/A	—
2003–04	1	3	2nd	Round of 16	N/A	—
2004–05	1	3	3rd	Round of 16	N/A	—
2005–06	1	3	6th	N/A	N/A	—
**2006–07**	1	7	**1st**	**Winners**	Runners-up	—
2007–08	1	7	5th	N/A	N/A	—
2008–09	1	7	5th	N/A	N/A	—
2009–10	1	7	1st	Semi-final	Runners-up	—
2010–11	1	7	2nd	Round of 16	N/A	—
2011–12	1	7	1st	Quarter-final	Quarter-final	N/A
2012–13	1	7	3rd	N/A	N/A	N/A
2013–14	1	VII	1st	Round of 16	Quarter-final	N/A
2014–15	1	VII	2nd	Semi-final	N/A	N/A
2015–16	1	VII	3rd	N/A	N/A	2nd in group, Round of 16
2016–17	1	VII	2nd	Round of 16	N/A	N/A
2017–18	1	VII	2nd	Quarter-final	N/A	N/A
2018–19	1	VII	3rd	N/A	N/A	4th in group
2019–20 (Note: In March 2020, all fixtures were suspended due to the COVID-19 pandemic in Spain. On 6 May 2020, the Royal Spanish Football Federation announced the premature end of the leagues, revoking all relegations, declaring each divisional leader as champion and cancelling the Copa del Rey Juvenil and the Copa de Campeones for the season.)	1	VII	2nd	N/A	N/A	4th in group
2020–21	1	VII-B/C	2nd/2nd	N/A (Note: Copa del Rey Juvenil not held in 2020–21.)	N/A	N/A (Note: UEFA Youth League not held in 2020–21.)
2021–22	1	VII	1st	Round of 16	Quarter-final	N/A
2022–23	1	VII	1st	Round of 16	Quarter-final	N/A
2023–24	1	VII	5th	Round of 32	N/A	N/A
2024–25	1	VII	1st	Round of 16	Final	N/A

== Honours ==
National competitions

- División de Honor: 9
  - 1996, 1998, 2007, 2010, 2012, 2014, 2022, 2023, 2025
- Copa de Campeones: 1
  - 2007
- Copa del Rey: 1
  - 1961

== See also ==
- Valencia CF
- Valencia CF Mestalla
