= CA Osasuna Cantera =

Spanish youth football academy

CA Osasuna (youth system)
- Full name: Club Atlético Osasuna B
- Ground: Tajonar Facilities, Pamplona, Navarre, Spain
- Capacity: 4,000
- President: Luis Sabalza
- Head coach: David García
- League: División de Honor
- 2018–19: División de Honor, Gr. 2, 9th
- Website: osasuna.es/futbol-base
Home colours	Away colours

The cantera (quarry) of Spanish professional football club CA Osasuna is the organisation's youth academy, developing players from childhood through to the integration of the best prospects into the adult teams.

The final category within the youth structure is the Juvenil A (Basque: Gazteak A) under-18/19 team which represents the club in national competition. The successful graduates then usually move to the club's affiliated team for younger players, CD Subiza (previously CD Iruña), or to the reserve team, Osasuna B which are also considered part of the cantera due to being stages in progression towards the senior team, albeit competing in the adult league system.

The academy is based at the club training complex, Tajonar, which is often the metonym used to refer to the system itself.

== Background ==
The top football clubs in the Spanish leagues generally place great importance in developing their cantera to promote the players from within or sell to other clubs as a source of revenue, and Osasuna is no exception. Their youth recruitment network is focused primarily around their home region of Navarre and there are collaboration agreements in place with the small clubs in the region.

Navarre has a population of just 640,000, a small catchment zone for an elite football club, and additionally Osasuna faces a battle for some of the region's talented young players due to the presence of Athletic Bilbao, whose Basque-only player recruitment policy includes Navarre in its definition. In the 1990s and 2000s, several prominent players made the journey directly from Pamplona to Bilbao, including Ziganda, Larrainzar, Lacruz, Tiko, Orbaiz, Javi Martínez, David López and Muñoz, while others such as Goikoetxea, José Mari and Ezquerro moved from Osasuna to Athletic via other clubs. The Biscay organisation have an affiliate team (UDC Txantrea) in Pamplona, and several promising players who might otherwise have been likely to join Osasuna, the closest major club to their home towns (such as Iraizoz, Gurpegui, Llorente, San José and Muniain) were recruited by Athletic instead. This situation of increasingly aggressive recruitment fostered a tense relationship between the two clubs, arguably more so than any on-field battles.

After a spell in the late 2000s during which Osasuna had few new academy graduates joining their main squad while Athletic reached a European final with a team full of Navarros, the trend reversed: Osasuna's relegation from La Liga in 2014 provided an opportunity for several academy players to integrate into the side in the less intense atmosphere of the second tier, and they played a role in the club's return to the top level in 2016. Meanwhile, Athletic recruited hardly any further youth players from Navarre in the same period, although the likes of Williams and Remiro were already at the Bilbao club. In the late 2010s, Villarreal also began to make repeated 'raids' on Osasuna, enticing several young teenagers to join their setup, as did Barcelona.

According to a 2016 report, Osasuna had a total of 11 homegrown players (as per UEFA guidelines, three years of training between 15 and 21 years old) still at their formative club, with another five at other top clubs across Europe. As a club from a small city with limited resources, the youth department's ability to train such coveted players (as well as provide others to the senior squad) is a vital source of income. The departures of four of the former youth players, all of whom became Spanish internationals – Raúl García, Monreal, Javi Martínez and Azpilicueta – earned Osasuna €31 million in transfer fees; the fifth and last of those departures, under-21 midfielder Mikel Merino in 2016, brought in a further €4 million. Another analysis in the same year concluded that the Navarre region was the most successful in Spain for producing top-level footballers per head of population (25 players, equating to 39 per million residents) thanks to the efforts of both Osasuna and Athletic Bilbao in recruiting and developing local talent.

In the summer of 2017, Álex Berenguer became the latest canterano to move abroad for a considerable fee (€5.5 million), an important financial boost in the wake of another relegation. Athletic Bilbao had been interested in Berenguer, but no deal was agreed due in part to the rivalry between the clubs. At the same time, Athletic secured the signature of 18-year-old Jesús Areso from Osasuna, paying his modest contractual release clause amount making it impossible for the approach to be rejected; this led to a temporary break in relations between the clubs due to Osasuna's annoyance at the manner in which their board felt the business was conducted. Athletic eventually signed Berenguer three years later, triggering an additional €1.5 million payment from Torino to Osasuna due to a clause in the transfer set up at the height of the Areso dispute. A further small fee was also received in relation to milestones achieved by Oihan Sancet who had moved to Bilbao in 2015 as a juvenile. Areso returned to Osasuna under freedom of contract in 2021 after he was frozen out of Athletic's reserve squad due to failing to agree contractual terms, and subsequently was signed again by Athletic in 2025 after proving himself a top-level player, one more via a release fee clause which this time boosted Osasuna's finances by €12 million.

== National competitions ==
The Juvenil A team play in Group II of the División de Honor Juvenil as their regular annual competition. Their main rivals in the league group are Athletic Bilbao and Real Sociedad. The under-17 team, Juvenil B, plays in the Liga Nacional Juvenil which is the lower division of the same structure.

The team also occasionally participates in the Copa de Campeones and the Copa del Rey Juvenil, qualification for which is dependent on final league group position. In these nationwide competitions the opposition includes the academy teams of Barcelona, Atlético Madrid, Sevilla and Real Madrid.

== International tournaments ==
It is possible for Osasuna Juvenil to participate in the UEFA Youth League, either by winning the previous season's Copa de Campeones or by way of the senior team qualifying for the UEFA Champions League group stages, but so far neither has been achieved.

== Structure ==
The core of boys from the Navarre region are first introduced into the Tajonar Futbol 8 teams at around 10 years of age and advance by an age group every season through Infantil, Cadete and Juvenil levels. In the past, players retained after their Juvenil A spell (aged about 17) would typically move to reserve team CA Osasuna B (Promesas) to gain experience in an adult league (Segunda División B level in most years). However, Promesas is an under-23 team and it can be difficult for the youngest players to make an impact. Some other leading clubs in Spain have a further reserve team or an affiliated club in the lower Tercera División level to bridge this gap (see Villarreal CF C/Real Sociedad C/CD Basconia/Sevilla FC C), and in 2016 Osasuna made an agreement with local CD Iruña to fulfil the role. The aim was for some of the youth academy graduates to spend one or two seasons at Iruña before the best progressed to Osasuna Promesas, and thereafter on to the senior team when ready to do so. In practice, the relegation of Promesas in 2017–18 forced Iruña (whose team had included Jon Moncayola that season) to drop into the Navarre regional leagues, below the level considered beneficial for the development of the youth graduates. In 2020, a new agreement was reached with CD Subiza for this purpose.

=== Head coaches ===
The coaches are often former Osasuna players who themselves graduated from Tajonar.

Squad	Age	Coach	Tier	League
Juvenil A	16–18	David García	1	División de Honor (Gr. II)
Juvenil B	16–17	Iñaki Muñoz	2	Liga Nacional (Gr. XVI)
Cadete A	15–16	Jonathan Unanua	1	Liga Cadete Navarra
Cadete B	14–15	Pablo Orbaiz	2	Primera Cadete

== Current squad (Juvenil A) ==
As of 1 March 2022

Note: Flags indicate national team as defined under FIFA eligibility rules; some limited exceptions apply. Players may hold more than one non-FIFA nationality.

No.	Pos.	Nation	Player
—	GK	ESP	Ander Ibáñez
—	GK	ESP	Rafa Fernández
—	DF	ESP	Asier Pérez
—	DF	ESP	Eloy Goñi
—	DF	ESP	Iñaki Rupérez
—	DF	ESP	Mario Salazar
—	DF	ESP	Jon Vergara
—	DF	ESP	Sergio Pascual
—	DF	ESP	Mikel Ansó
—	DF	ESP	Víctor Ciáurriz
—	MF	ESP	Asier Osambela
—	MF	ESP	Eneko Oroz

No.	Pos.	Nation	Player
—	MF	ESP	Eneko Sierra
—	MF	ESP	Iker Lekuna
—	MF	ESP	Jorge Hernández
—	MF	ESP	Imanol Beloki
—	MF	ESP	Lucas Ibáñez
—	MF	ESP	Miguel Auría
—	MF	ESP	Miguel Pascal
—	FW	ESP	Alejandro Morales
—	FW	ESP	Carlos Lumbreras
—	FW	ESP	Diego Aznar
—	FW	ESP	Juan Asirón

== Season to season (Juvenil A) ==
=== Superliga / Liga de Honor sub-19 ===
Seasons with two or more trophies shown in bold

: :Season: :	Level	Group	Position	Copa del Rey Juvenil	Notes
1986–87	1		6th	Quarter-final	
1987–88	1		7th	Round of 16	
1988–89	1		2nd	Semi-final	
1989–90	1		7th	Quarter-final	
1990–91	1		12th	Semi-final	
1991–92	1		6th	Round of 16	
1992–93	1		5th	Semi-final	
1993–94	1		16th	N/A	Relegated
1994–95	2	2	1st	N/A	No promotion due to restructuring

=== División de Honor Juvenil ===
Seasons with two or more trophies shown in bold

*Season*	Level	Group	Position	Copa del Rey Juv.	Copa de Campeones	Europe/notes
1995–96	1	2	3rd	Round of 16	N/A	---
1996–97	1	2	3rd	Quarter-final	N/A	---
1997–98	1	2	6th	N/A	N/A	---
1998–99	1	2	5th	N/A	N/A	---
1999–00	1	2	4th	N/A	N/A	---
**2000–01**	1	2	**1st**	Semi-final	**Winners**	---
2001–02	1	2	4th	N/A	N/A	---
2002–03	1	2	2nd	Quarter-final	N/A	---
2003–04	1	2	3rd	Runners-up	N/A	---
2004–05	1	2	1st	Round of 16	2nd in group of 3	---
2005–06	1	2	4th	N/A	N/A	---
2006–07	1	2	6th	N/A	N/A	---
2007–08	1	2	2nd	Round of 16	N/A	---
2008–09	1	2	5th	N/A	N/A	---
2009–10	1	2	3rd	N/A	N/A	---
2010–11	1	2	3rd	Round of 16	N/A	---
2011–12	1	2	4th	N/A	N/A	N/A
2012–13	1	2	2nd	Quarter-final	N/A	N/A
2013–14	1	II	5th	N/A	N/A	N/A
2014–15	1	II	3rd	N/A	N/A	N/A
2015–16	1	II	4th	N/A	N/A	N/A
2016–17	1	II	1st	Round of 16	Quarter-final	N/A
2017–18	1	II	10th	N/A	N/A	N/A
2018–19	1	II	9th	N/A	N/A	N/A
2019–20 (Note: In March 2020, all fixtures were suspended due to the COVID-19 pandemic in Spain. On 6 May 2020, the Royal Spanish Football Federation announced the premature end of the leagues, revoking all relegations, declaring each divisional leader as champion and cancelling the Copa del Rey Juvenil and the Copa de Campeones for the season.)	1	II	3rd	N/A	N/A	N/A
2020–21	1	II-A/C	1st/2nd	N/A (Note: Copa del Rey Juvenil not held in 2020–21.)	N/A	N/A (Note: UEFA Youth League not held in 2020–21.)
2021–22	1	II	2nd	Round of 16	N/A	N/A
2022–23	1	II	4th	N/A	N/A	N/A
2023–24	1	II	2nd	Round of 32	N/A	N/A
2024–25	1	II	2nd	Round of 32	N/A	N/A

== Famous players ==
Notable graduates who passed through the youth system on their way to establishing themselves with the Osasuna senior side and/or other clubs include:

As of September 2025

players currently at Osasuna in bold, 'graduation' year in parentheses

- Enrique Martín (1975)
- Roberto Santamaría Calavia (1981)
- José Ángel Ziganda (1985)
- Jon Andoni Goikoetxea (1985)
- Txomin Larrainzar (1988)
- Iñigo Larrainzar (1989)
- José Mari (1989)
- Santi Castillejo (1990)
- César Cruchaga (1992)
- Javier López Vallejo (1992)
- Txomin Nagore (1993)
- César Palacios (1993)
- José Manuel Mateo (1994)
- Santiago Ezquerro (1994)
- Marí Lacruz (1994)
- Chema (1994)
- Patxi Puñal (1994)
- Tiko (1995)
- Josetxo (1995)
- Pablo Orbaiz (1996)
- Iñaki Muñoz (1997)
- Juan Elía (1997)
- José Izquierdo (1998)
- David López (2001)
- Javier Flaño (2001)
- Miguel Flaño (2001)
- Iñaki Astiz (2002)
- Raúl García (2004)
- Oier (2005)
- Javi Martínez (2005)
- César Azpilicueta (2006)
- Roberto Torres (2007)
- Unai García (2011)
- David García (2013)
- Miguel Olavide (2013)
- Mikel Merino (2014)
- Álex Berenguer (2014)
- **Kike Barja** (2014)
- Aitor Buñuel (2016)
- Jesús Areso (2017)
- **Jon Moncayola** (2017)
- **Aimar Oroz** (2018)
- Adama Boiro (2021)

== Honours ==
=== National competitions ===
- División de Honor (Group II): (regional league)
  - 0 (Liga Nacional Juvenil 1975–86)
  - 3 2001, 2005, 2017 ( current format since 1995)
- Copa de Campeones:
  - 0 (runners-up 1989) (Superliga Juvenil / Liga de Honor Sub-19, single league, 1986–95)
  - 1 2001 (current format since 1995)
- Copa del Rey: (since 1951)
  - winners 0 times
  - runners-up 1 time 2004

== See also ==
- CA Osasuna senior team
- Osasuna B ‘Promesas’ – reserve team
- CD Iruña – affiliated club
