= Real Betis Cantera =

Spanish professional football club

Real Betis (youth system)
- Ground: Ciudad Deportiva Luis del Sol, Seville, Andalusia, Spain
- Capacity: 4,000
- President: Ángel Haro
- Coach: Pablo Del Pino
- League: División de Honor
- 2019–20: División de Honor – Group 4, 3rd
- Website: realbetisbalompie.es/juvenil-a
| Home colours | Away colours | Third colours |

The cantera (quarry) of Spanish professional football club Real Betis is the organisation's youth academy, developing players from childhood through to the integration of the best prospects into the adult teams.

The final category within the youth structure is the Juvenil A under-18/19 team, which represents the club in national competitions. Successful graduates usually move to the club's reserve team, Betis Deportivo, which is also considered part of the cantera due to being a stage in progression towards the senior team, albeit competing in the adult league system (currently Segunda División B).

The academy is based at the club training complex, Ciudad Deportiva Luis del Sol.

== Background and structure ==
The top football clubs in the Spanish leagues generally place great importance in developing their cantera to promote the players from within, or sell to other clubs as a source of revenue, and Real Betis is no exception. Their youth recruitment network is focused around their home region of Andalusia, and in particular the Province of Seville, and there are collaboration agreements in place with small clubs in the region.

The club training complex is named in honour of Luis Del Sol, a 1950s youth graduate who went on to greatness with Real Madrid, Juventus and Spain.

Betis face a battle with city rivals Sevilla to sign the best local prospects. As at senior level, over recent years Sevilla have been slightly superior to Betis, both in terms of success in youth competitions and producing quality players for the first team.

The core of young prospects are first introduced into the Benjamín teams at around age 8, and advance by an age group every season through Alevín, Infantil, Cadete and Juvenil levels. The players who are retained by Betis after their Juvenil A spell (aged about 18) would typically join reserve team Betis Deportivo, to gain experience in an adult league (Segunda División B level in most years). They can spend up to five years with the B team, often with some loan spells at other clubs included, although the best players usually move up to the senior team within 2 seasons if considered ready to do so, with the remaining B team members augmented by the next set of youth graduates in their ongoing battle to retain their divisional status.

The best achievements of the Betis senior side in the early 21st century, when they won the 2004–05 Copa del Rey, finished 4th in the league, and qualified for the Champions League. This was accomplished with a high number of homegrown players in the squad including Capi, David Rivas, Arzu, Melli and Juan José Cañas whose careers were defined by their long spells at Betis, plus Joaquín who later transferred to Valencia for €25 million.

In the subsequent decade, the production line of canteranos did not stall entirely, but the Verdiblancos never came close to developing another group of that quality, nor were they able to nurture any exceptional individuals who could be sold on for economic benefit, until 2017 when Dani Ceballos signed for Real Madrid for €18 million. The same club have also tempted younger players to join their academy from that of Betis for little or no fee, 15-year-old Fernando Rufo following in the footsteps of several others in summer 2018. The record for the largest fee received by the club was soon eclipsed in July 2018 with the €30 million purchase of Fabián Ruiz by Napoli, while Junior Firpo went to FC Barcelona a year later for another €18 million fee.

== National competitions ==
The Juvenil A team play in Group IV of the División de Honor Juvenil de Fútbol as their regular annual competition. Their main rivals in the league group are Sevilla and Málaga. The under-17 team, Juvenil B plays in the Liga Nacional Juvenil de Fútbol, which is the lower division of the same structure.

The team also regularly participates in the Copa de Campeones and the Copa del Rey Juvenil, qualification for which is dependent on final league group position. In these nationwide competitions, the opposition includes the academy teams of Barcelona, Athletic Bilbao, Espanyol and Real Madrid.

== International tournaments ==
It is possible for Betis Juvenil to participate in the UEFA Youth League, either by winning the previous season's Copa de Campeones or by way of the senior team qualifying for the UEFA Champions League group stages, but so far neither has been achieved.

=== Head coaches ===
| Squad | Age | Coach | Tier | League |
|---|---|---|---|---|
| Juvenil A | 16-18 | Pablo Del Pino | 1 | División de Honor (Gr. IV) |
| Juvenil B | 16-17 | Gustavo Sánchez | 2 | Liga Nacional (Gr. XIV) |
| Cadete A | 15-16 | Juan Barco | 1 | División de Honor Andaluza Cadete |
| Cadete B | 14-15 | Miguel Ángel Caro | 2 | Primera Andaluza Cadete (Gr. 1) |

== Current squads ==
=== Juvenil A ===
As of February 2026

Note: Flags indicate national team as defined under FIFA eligibility rules; some limited exceptions apply. Players may hold more than one non-FIFA nationality.

| No. | Pos. | Nation | Player |
|---|---|---|---|
| — | GK | POL | Bruno Klimek |
| — | GK | UKR | Yan Zhuravsky |
| — | DF | ESP | Carlos de Roa |
| — | DF | ESP | Cayetano Cordón |
| — | DF | ESP | Curro Macías |
| — | DF | CIV | Emmanuel |
| — | DF | JPN | Kenta Bandera |
| — | DF | ESP | Marc Castro |
| — | DF | ESP | Mario Navarro |
| — | DF | ESP | Miguel Cuevas |
| — | MF | ESP | Alberto de Haro |
| — | MF | ESP | Enzo Fierro |

| No. | Pos. | Nation | Player |
|---|---|---|---|
| — | MF | ESP | Fran Batán |
| — | MF | ESP | José Ortega |
| — | MF | ESP | Marcos Mora |
| — | MF | ESP | Migue Romero |
| — | MF | ESP | Rica Fúnez |
| — | MF | ESP | Trebu |
| — | FW | ESP | Antonio González |
| — | FW | ESP | Diego Atienza |
| — | FW | ESP | Juan Rodríguez |
| — | FW | LVA | Nikita Doronins |
| — | FW | ESP | Rafa Oya |
| — | FW | ESP | Rubén De Sá |

=== Juvenil B ===
As of February 2026

Note: Flags indicate national team as defined under FIFA eligibility rules; some limited exceptions apply. Players may hold more than one non-FIFA nationality.

| No. | Pos. | Nation | Player |
|---|---|---|---|
| — | GK | ESP | David Benítez |
| — | GK | ESP | Victor Kroes |
| — | DF | ESP | Álvaro Díez |
| — | DF | ESP | Antonio Sáenz |
| — | DF | ESP | Carlos Lara |
| — | DF | ESP | Daniel Amoreti |
| — | DF | ESP | Darío Romo |
| — | DF | ESP | Gonzalo Acosta |
| — | DF | ESP | Gonzalo Espinosa |
| — | DF | ESP | Iker Etame |
| — | DF | ESP | Manuel Alejandro Garrido |

| No. | Pos. | Nation | Player |
|---|---|---|---|
| — | MF | ESP | Adrián Coderch |
| — | MF | ESP | Alejandro Camino |
| — | MF | ESP | Kike Collantes |
| — | MF | ESP | Miguel Bermúdez |
| — | FW | ESP | Adrián Bernal |
| — | FW | ESP | Adrián Vidican |
| — | FW | ROU | Alfonso Luque |
| — | FW | ESP | Derick Obeng |
| — | FW | ESP | Kingsley Eshun |
| — | FW | ESP | Tiago López |

== Famous players ==
Notable graduates who passed through the youth system on their way to establishing themselves with the Betis senior side and/or other clubs include:

As of July 2019

players currently at Betis in bold, 'graduation' year in parentheses

- Luis del Sol (1953)
- Juanín (1957)
- Rogelio Sosa (1962)
- Paco Telechia (1966)
- Francisco Bizcocho (1968)
- Sebastián Alabanda (1969)
- Rafael Gordillo (1975)
- Antonio Casado 1979)
- Álex (1979)
- Joaquín Parra (1980)
- Gabino (1982)
- Chano (1984)
- Eduardo Rodríguez (1984)
- Juan Antonio Ureña (1986)
- Juan Merino (1989)
- Ángel Cuéllar (1989)
- Roberto Ríos (1990)
- Juan José Cañas (1990)
- Capi (1995)
- Diego Tristán (1995)
- Fernando Varela (1996)
- David Rivas (1997)
- Arzu (1999)
- Toni Doblas (1999)
- Dani (1999)
- **Joaquín** (1999)
- Melli 2001)
- Manuel Arana (2002)
- Álvaro Cejudo (2003)
- José Isidoro (2005)
- Javi López (2005)
- José Cañas (2005)
- Adrián (2006)
- Alejandro Pozuelo (2010)
- Álvaro Vadillo (2011)
- Alex Martínez (2012)
- Rafa Navarro (2013)
- Dani Ceballos (2014)
- Fabián (2014)
- **Francis** (2015)
- Junior Firpo (2015)

== Season to season (Juvenil A) ==
=== Superliga / Liga de Honor sub-19 ===
Seasons with two or more trophies shown in bold

| : :Season: : | Level | Group | Position | Copa del Rey Juvenil | Notes |
|---|---|---|---|---|---|
| 1986–87 | 1 | | 7th | Quarter-final | |
| 1987–88 | 1 | | 4th | Semi-final | |
| 1988–89 | 1 | | 4th | Semi-final | |
| 1989–90 | 1 | | 2nd | Winners | |
| 1990–91 | 1 | | 7th | Quarter-final | |
| 1991–92 | 1 | | 13th | Runners-up | |
| 1992–93 | 1 | | N/A | N/A | Did not enter tournaments |
| 1993–94 | 1 | | N/A | N/A | Did not enter tournaments |
| 1994–95 | 1 | | N/A | N/A | Did not enter tournaments |

=== División de Honor Juvenil ===
Seasons with two or more trophies shown in bold

| *Season* | Level | Group | Position | Copa del Rey Juv. | Copa de Campeones | Europe/notes |
|---|---|---|---|---|---|---|
| 1995–96 | 1 | 4 | 2nd | Quarter-final | N/A | —N/a |
| 1996–97 | 1 | 4 | 3rd | Quarter-final | N/A | —N/a |
| 1997–98 | 1 | 4 | 2nd | Winners | N/A | —N/a |
| 1998–99 | 1 | 4 | 2nd | Winners | N/A | —N/a |
| 1999–00 | 1 | 4 | 4th | N/A | N/A | —N/a |
| 2000–01 | 1 | 4 | 2nd | Quarter-final | N/A | —N/a |
| 2001–02 | 1 | 4 | 1st | Round of 16 | 2nd in group of 3 | —N/a |
| 2002–03 | 1 | 4 | 2nd | Round of 16 | N/A | —N/a |
| 2003–04 | 1 | 4 | 3rd | Round of 16 | N/A | —N/a |
| 2004–05 | 1 | 4 | 3rd | Round of 16 | N/A | —N/a |
| 2005–06 | 1 | 4 | 1st | Round of 16 | 2nd in group of 3 | —N/a |
| 2006–07 | 1 | 4 | 2nd | Quarter-final | N/A | —N/a |
| 2007–08 | 1 | 4 | 2nd | Round of 16 | N/A | —N/a |
| 2008–09 | 1 | 4 | 11th | N/A | N/A | —N/a |
| 2009–10 | 1 | 4 | 1st | Quarter-final | Semi-final | —N/a |
| 2010–11 | 1 | 4 | 4th | N/A | N/A | —N/a |
| 2011–12 | 1 | 4 | 3rd | N/A | N/A | N/A |
| 2012–13 | 1 | 4 | 4th | N/A | N/A | N/A |
| 2013–14 | 1 | IV | 3rd | N/A | N/A | N/A |
| 2014–15 | 1 | IV | 4th | N/A | N/A | N/A |
| 2015–16 | 1 | IV | 3rd | N/A | N/A | N/A |
| 2016–17 | 1 | IV | 3rd | Round of 16 | N/A | N/A |
| 2017–18 | 1 | IV | 2nd | Round of 16 | N/A | N/A |
| 2018–19 | 1 | IV | 3rd | N/A | N/A | N/A |
| 2019–20 (Note: In March 2020, all fixtures were suspended due to the COVID-19 pandemic in Spain. On 6 May 2020, the Royal Spanish Football Federation announced the premature end of the leagues, revoking all relegations, declaring each divisional leader as champion and cancelling the Copa del Rey Juvenil and the Copa de Campeones for the season.) | 1 | IV | 3rd | N/A | N/A | N/A |
| 2020–21 | 1 | IV-B/C | 2nd/4th | N/A (Note: Copa del Rey Juvenil not held in 2020–21.) | N/A | N/A (Note: UEFA Youth League not held in 2020–21.) |
| 2021–22 | 1 | IV | 1st | Semi-final | Semi-final | N/A |
| 2022–23 | 1 | IV | 1st | Round of 16 | Final | N/A |
| 2023–24 | 1 | IV | 2nd | Quarter-final | Final | N/A |
| **2024–25** | 1 | IV | **1st** | Semi-final | **Winners** | Round of 32 |

== Honours ==
=== National competitions ===
- División de Honor Juvenil (Group III): (regional league)
  - 5 1978, 1980, 1983, 1984, 1985 (Liga Nacional Juvenil 1975-1986)
  - 5 2002, 2006, 2010, 2022, 2023, 2025 (current format since 1995)
- Copa de Campeones:
  - 0 (runners-up 1990) (Superliga Juvenil / Liga de Honor Sub-19, single league, 1986–1995)
  - 1 2025 (current format since 1995)
  - 2 times runners-up: 2023, 2024
- Copa del Rey Juvenil: (since 1951)
  - 5 times winners 1983, 1990, 1998, 1999 e 2026
  - 2 times runners-up: 1962, (Note: The Betis team in the competition was Triana Balompié which thereafter became the name of the reserve team (now Real Betis B)) 1992
