= Atlético Madrid (youth) =

Atlético Madrid Juvenil
- Full name: Club Atlético de Madrid Juvenil
- Nicknames: Los Colchoneros (The Mattress Makers); Los Rojiblancos (The Red-and-Whites); Los Indios (The Indians)
- Ground: Centro Deportivo Wanda, Alcalá de Henares, Madrid, Spain
- Capacity: 2,500
- President: Enrique Cerezo
- Coach: Vacant
- League: División de Honor
- 2019–20: División de Honor – Group 5, 2nd
- Website: clubatleticodemadrid.com/cantera/
Home colours	Away colours	Third colours

Club Atlético de Madrid Juvenil are the under-19 team of Spanish professional football club Atlético Madrid. They play in the Group V of the División de Honor Juvenil de Fútbol where their main rivals are Real Madrid and Rayo Vallecano.

They also participate in the national Copa de Campeones Juvenil and the Copa del Rey Juvenil, qualification for which is dependent on final league group position, and have taken part in the continental UEFA Youth League.

== Juvenil A ==
As of 17 January 2024.

Note: Flags indicate national team as defined under FIFA eligibility rules; some limited exceptions apply. Players may hold more than one non-FIFA nationality.

No.	Pos.	Nation	Player
1	GK	ESP	Salvi Esquivel
4	DF	ESP	Félix Giménez
5	DF	ESP	Diego Rosado
7	MF	ESP	Rayane Belaid
9	FW	ESP	Paco Esteban
11	DF	ESP	Julio Díaz
12	DF	ARG	Gerónimo Spina
14	MF	ESP	Javier Díaz

No.	Pos.	Nation	Player
19	FW	ESP	Omar Janneh
20	MF	ESP	Iker Luque
21	MF	ESP	Juan Alegre
25	GK	ESP	Daniel Rubio
26	MF	ESP	Jano Monserrate
27	DF	ESP	Javier Boñar
28	MF	ESP	Noe Gil

=== Season to season (Juvenil A) ===
==== Superliga / Liga de Honor sub-19 ====
Seasons with two or more trophies shown in bold

: :Season: :	Level	Group	Position	Copa del Rey Juvenil	Notes
1986–87	2	1	1st	Quarter-final	
1987–88	1		5th	Quarter-final	
1988–89	1		5th	Quarter-final	
1989–90	1		10th	N/A	
1990–91	1		4th	Round of 16	
1991–92	1		8th	Quarter-final	
1992–93	2	6	4th	N/A	Academy disbanded, club represented by independent team
1993–94	2	5	3rd	N/A	Academy disbanded, club represented by independent team
1994–95	2	5	2nd	N/A	

==== División de Honor Juvenil ====
Seasons with two or more trophies shown in bold

*Season*	Level	Group	Position	Copa del Rey Juv.	Copa de Campeones	Europe/notes
1995–96	1	5	12th	N/A	N/A	—N/a
1996–97	1	5	2nd	Round of 16	N/A	—N/a
1997–98	1	5	9th	N/A	N/A	—N/a
1998–99	1	5	8th	N/A	N/A	—N/a
1999–00	1	5	2nd	Semi-final	N/A	—N/a
2000–01	1	5	1st	Round of 16	Runners-up	—N/a
**2001–02**	1	5	**1st**	Quarter-final	**Winners**	—N/a
2002–03	1	5	1st	Round of 16	3rd in group of 3	—N/a
2003–04	1	5	5th	N/A	N/A	—N/a
2004–05	1	5	1st	Round of 16	3rd in group of 3	—N/a
2005–06	1	5	4th	N/A	N/A	—N/a
2006–07	1	5	3rd	N/A	N/A	—N/a
2007–08	1	5	3rd	N/A	N/A	—N/a
2008–09	1	5	1st	Round of 16	Quarter-final	—N/a
2009–10	1	5	2nd	Quarter-final	N/A	—N/a
2010–11	1	5	9th	N/A	N/A	—N/a
2011–12	1	5	1st	Semi-final	Semi-final	N/A
2012–13	1	5	2nd	Semi-final	Quarter-final	N/A
2013–14	1	V	2nd	Round of 16	N/A	1st in group, Round of 16
2014–15	1	V	4th	N/A	N/A	1st in group, Quarter-final
**2015–16**	1	V	**1st**	**Winners**	Quarter-final	2nd in group, Play-off round
2016–17	1	V	2nd	Runners-up	Quarter-final	2nd in group, Quarter-final
**2017–18**	1	V	**1st**	**Winners**	**Winners**	2nd in group, Quarter-final
2018–19	1	V	1st	Runners-up	Quarter-final	1st in group, Round of 16
2019–20 (Note: In March 2020, all fixtures were suspended due to the COVID-19 pandemic in Spain. On 6 May 2020, the Royal Spanish Football Federation announced the premature end of the leagues, revoking all relegations, declaring each divisional leader as champion and cancelling the Copa del Rey Juvenil and the Copa de Campeones for the season.)	1	V	2nd	N/A	N/A	2nd in group, Round of 16
2020–21	1	V-A/C	2nd/1st	N/A (Note: Copa del Rey Juvenil not held in 2020–21.)	Quarter-final	N/A (Note: UEFA Youth League not held in 2020–21.)
2021–22	1	V	1st	Quarter-final	Quarter-final	2nd in group, Semi-final
2022–23	1	V	2nd	Round of 16	Quarter-final	1st in group, Quarter-final
**2023–24**	1	V	**1st**	Round of 16	**Winners**	2nd in group, Playoff round
2024–25	1	V	2nd	Quarter-final	N/A	8th in league phase, Round of 16

=== Honours ===
National competitions

- División de Honor: 12
  - 2001, 2002, 2003, 2005, 2009, 2012, 2016, 2018, 2019, 2021, 2022, 2024
- Copa de Campeones: 3
  - 2002, 2018, 2024
- Copa del Rey: 5
  - 1952, 1956, 1958, 2016, 2018

== Juvenil B ==
As of 1 September 2023.

Note: Flags indicate national team as defined under FIFA eligibility rules; some limited exceptions apply. Players may hold more than one non-FIFA nationality.

No.	Pos.	Nation	Player
—	GK	ESP	Álvaro Moreno
—	DF	ESP	Pedro Mula
—	DF	ESP	Dani Muñoz
—	DF	ESP	Hugo Lozano
—	DF	ESP	David Arza

No.	Pos.	Nation	Player
—	MF	ESP	Jorge Castillo
—	MF	ESP	Nico Fernández
—	FW	ESP	Jairo Fernández
—	FW	ESP	Jorge Rajado
—	FW	ESP	Óscar Bazaga

== See also ==
- Atlético Madrid B
- Atlético Madrid C
