= Athletic Bilbao Cantera =

Spanish football club

Athletic Club (youth system)
- Full name: Athletic Club
- Stadium: Instalaciones de Lezama
- Capacity: 1,500
- President: Jon Uriarte
- Head coach: Andoni Galiano
- League: División de Honor
- 2021–22: División de Honor, Gr. 2, 1st
- Website: athletic-club.eus/lezama
Home colours	Away colours	Third colours

The cantera (quarry) of Spanish professional football club Athletic Bilbao is the organisation's youth academy, developing players from childhood through to the integration of the best prospects into the adult teams.

The final category within the youth structure is the Juvenil A (Basque: Gazteak A) under-18/19 team which represents the club in national competition. The successful graduates then usually move to the club's affiliated team for younger players, CD Basconia, or occasionally directly to the reserve team, Bilbao Athletic, both of which are also considered part of the cantera due to being stages in progression towards the senior team, albeit competing in the adult league system.

The academy is based at the club training complex, Lezama, which is often the metonym used to refer to the system itself.

== Background and structure ==
The top football clubs in the Spanish leagues generally place great importance in developing their cantera to promote the players from within or sell to other clubs as a source of revenue. As a club who have a small pool of players to choose from due to their Basque-only policy, this focus on home-grown talent is even more vital to Athletic Bilbao.

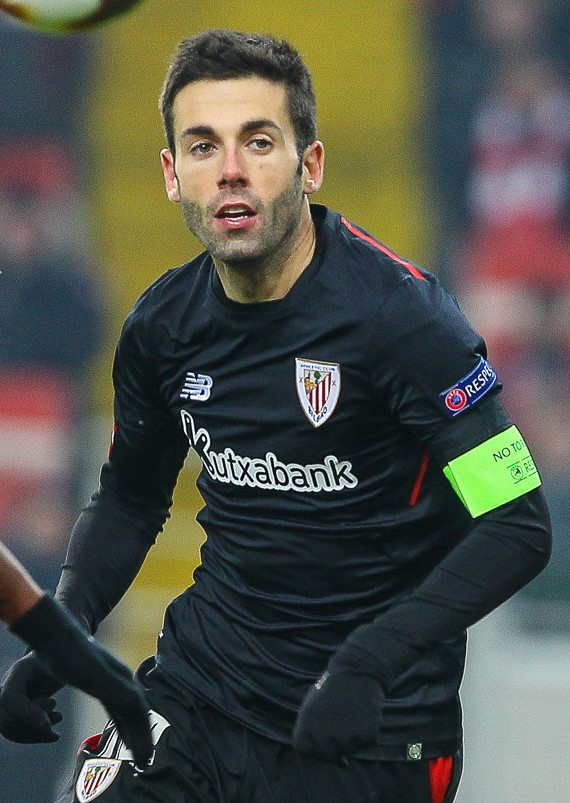
Markel Susaeta is an example of a player who joined the club at a young age, moved steadily through all youth levels and established himself in the senior team

Most of the senior team players in recent seasons are youth academy graduates: 15 of the squad in 2014 (as per analysis from the CIES Football Observatory). In 2016, Athletic's total of 17 'homegrown players' (as per UEFA guidelines: three years of training between 15 and 21 years old) still at their formative club was the highest across Europe's 'big five' leagues, significantly more than all other elite clubs apart from neighbours Real Sociedad. Including eight former trainees at other eligible clubs, Athletic's total of 25 homegrown players ranked as the fifth-highest across the continent, although only third in Spain behind Real Madrid and FC Barcelona who retained just a few of the many high-level professionals they produced. Moreover, further end-of-year analysis demonstrated that these graduates were not merely backup squad members but integral elements of the team, involved in 64% of the minutes in the 2016–17 La Liga, where they finished 7th.

The core of boys from the local Biscay province are first introduced into the Lezama Alevín teams at around 10 years of age and advance by an age group every season through Infantil, Cadete and Juvenil levels; there are collaboration agreements in place with the small clubs in the province, whose staff collaborate with Athletic scouts to identify any standout talents emerging at each stage. The players who are retained by Athletic after their Juvenil A spell (aged about 18) typically join the club's farm team in Basauri, CD Basconia, playing at the regionalised fourth level of the Spanish adult system. Their squad is normally expanded further with new signings from the wider regions's youth clubs, most notably Danok Bat and Antiguoko who regularly challenge the professional academy teams for the title in their División de Honor group. A number of senior players have also emerged from the Txantrea club in Pamplona who have a collaborative agreement with Athletic (renewed for four more years in 2017).

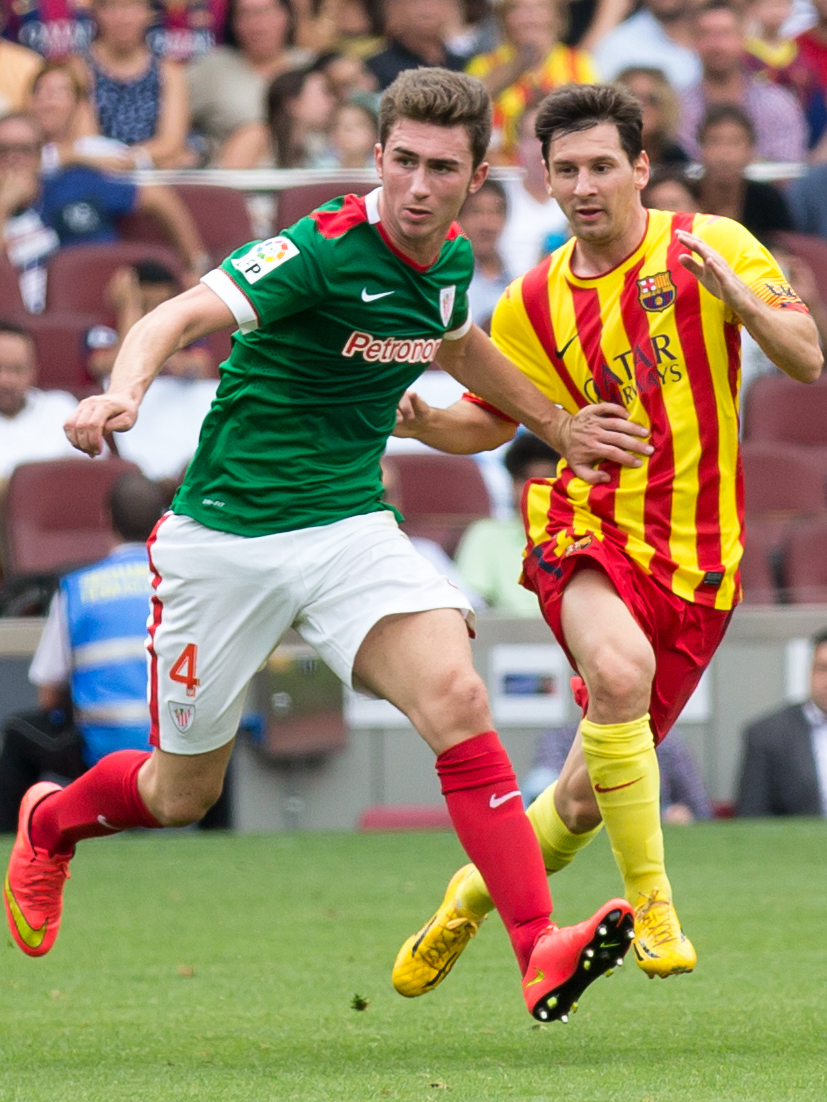
The 2018 transfer of youth graduate Aymeric Laporte (left) brought a revenue of €64 million into the club

The players usually spend one or two seasons at Basconia, some going out on loan to other local clubs, before the best are promoted to the reserve team Bilbao Athletic and then on to the senior team when considered ready to do so. There are exceptions to this sequence; notably Iker Muniain showed such promise that he was promoted early to Juvenil A as a 15-year-old in 2008, was selected by Bilbao Athletic as soon as he turned 16 in January 2009 and became a senior team regular at the start of the next season.

The club received its first large transfer windfall for a player who had graduated from the youth system since the €12 million deal of summer 2005 which took Asier del Horno to Chelsea (Note: Javi Martínez and Ander Herrera were sold for large fees but were not youth players at Athletic; Fernando Llorente departed for nothing under freedom of contract) in January 2018, when Aymeric Laporte (one of the few French players to have played for the club at any level) moved to Manchester City for a fee of around €64 million, his contractual release clause amount. That deal was eclipsed seven months later when goalkeeper Kepa Arrizabalaga, an Athletic player since the age of 9, was acquired by Chelsea for his release clause of €80 million, making him the world's most expensive goalkeeper.

== National competitions ==
The Juvenil A team play in Group II of the División de Honor Juvenil de Fútbol as their regular annual competition. Their main rivals in the league group are Real Sociedad and Osasuna. The under-17 team, Juvenil B, plays in the Liga Nacional Juvenil which is the lower division of the same structure.

The team also regularly participates in the Copa de Campeones Juvenil and the Copa del Rey Juvenil, qualification for which is dependent on final league group position. In these nationwide competitions the opposition includes the academy teams of Barcelona, Atlético Madrid, Sevilla and Real Madrid.

== International tournaments ==
For many years Athletic have been active in entering their youth team into international tournaments to gain experience, and in recent times these events have gained prominence in the football calendar. In 2012 the Juvenil team (including Aymeric Laporte and Iñaki Williams) appeared in the invitational NextGen Series but this was subsequently discontinued.

In 2013-14 Athletic's senior team qualified for the Champions League group stages, meaning that the Juvenil squad could play in the 2014-15 version of the UEFA Youth League. In the subsequent years there was no further chance to participate in that competition due to the senior team failing to qualify. The alternative route into the Youth League would be to win the previous season's Copa de Campeones but Athletic Juvenil have so far been unable to achieve this – they were losing finalists in 2022.

A younger age group (The Cadete B squad) also competes in the Manchester United Premier Cup annually. In 1998 Athletic, coached by future senior team boss Ernesto Valverde, won the tournament, although none of the players involved – not even Player Of The Tournament Jonan García – were able to become regulars in the senior team. Coincidentally that season was also very successful for other sections within the club: the senior team finished 2nd in the league and qualified for the Champions League while Bilbao Athletic finished 2nd in their Segunda B group and Basconia won their Tercera section, although neither subsidiary was promoted.

In 2006 (featuring Erik Morán in the squad) and 2012 (including Asier Villalibre) Athletic cadets also competed at the Manchester United Premier Cup world finals as the Spanish league representative after winning the national qualifier.

=== Head coaches ===
The coaches are often former Athletic players who themselves graduated from Lezama. The directors of the academy, Rafael Alkorta and Andoni Ayarza, are also former players, as was their predecessor José María Amorrortu, and the president he worked under, Josu Urrutia.

As of December 2018

Squad	Age	Coach	Tier	League
Juvenil A	16-18	Andoni Galiano; Joxean Álvarez	1	División de Honor (Gr. II)
Juvenil B	16-17	Ander Breda; Jon Ciaurri	2	Liga Nacional (Gr. IV)
Cadete A	15-16	Jon Solaun; Txema Añibarro	1	Cadete Liga Vasca
Cadete B	14-15	Ander Alaña; Luis Prieto	2	Cadete División de Honor

== Current squad (Juvenil A) ==
As of 26 May 2023

Note: Flags indicate national team as defined under FIFA eligibility rules; some limited exceptions apply. Players may hold more than one non-FIFA nationality.

No.	Pos.	Nation	Player
1	GK	ESP	Eric Gamen
2	DF	ESP	Ugaitz García
3	MF	ESP	Ander Fernández
4	DF	ESP	Aser Palacios
5	DF	ESP	Joseba Ituarte
6	MF	ESP	Alemu Plazaola
7	FW	ESP	Aimar Vicandi
8	MF	ESP	Peio Canales
9	FW	ESP	Asier Hierro
10	FW	ESP	Aingeru Olabarrieta
11	DF	ESP	Urtzi Albizua
12	DF	ESP	David Osipov
13	GK	ESP	Mikel Santos

No.	Pos.	Nation	Player
14	DF	ESP	Mikel Montero
15	MF	ESP	Gaizka Alboniga
16	DF	ESP	Yoel Baigorri
17	MF	ESP	Peio Huestamendia
18	MF	ESP	David Arredondo
19	FW	ESP	Kerman Junkera
20	FW	ESP	Jesús Vizcay
21	MF	ESP	Ander Barck
22	FW	ESP	Miracle Daniel
23	FW	ESP	Álvaro Sánchez
26	DF	ESP	Danel Belategi
28	FW	ESP	Adrián Pérez
29	FW	ESP	Ander Peciña

== Notable graduates ==
Players who passed through the youth system on their way to establishing themselves with the Athletic senior side or other clubs (since the opening of Lezama in 1971) include:

As of September 2025

players currently at Athletic in bold, 'graduation' year in parentheses

- José Ramón Alexanko (1973)
- Andoni Goikoetxea (1974)
- Manuel Sarabia (1974)
- Estanislao Argote (1975)
- Miguel de Andrés (1976)
- Santiago Urquiaga (1976)
- Miguel Ángel Sola (1976)
- Iñigo Liceranzu (1977)
- Txema Noriega (1977)
- Ismael Urtubi (1978)
- Luis de la Fuente (1978)
- Julio Salinas (1981)
- Patxi Salinas (1981)
- Genar Andrinúa (1982)
- Patxi Ferreira (1984)
- Rafael Alkorta (1985)
- Ander Garitano (1986)
- Josu Urrutia (1986)
- Andoni Lakabeg (1986)
- Ricardo Mendiguren (1987)
- Xabier Eskurza (1988)
- Aitor Larrazábal (1989)
- Kike Burgos (1989)
- Javi Gracia (1989)
- Óscar Tabuenka (1989)
- Juan José Valencia (1991)
- Aitor Karanka (1992)
- Julen Guerrero (1992)
- Edu Alonso (1992)
- Javi González (1993)
- Bolo (1993)
- Gaizka Garitano (1993)
- Óscar Vales (1994)
- Felipe (1994)
- César Caneda (1995)
- Iñaki Lafuente (1995)
- Daniel Aranzubia (1997)
- Francisco Yeste (1997)
- Asier del Horno (1999)
- Carlos Gurpegui (1999)
- Joseba Arriaga (2000)
- Andoni Iraola (2000)
- Ander Murillo (2001)
- Fernando Amorebieta (2003)
- Fernando Llorente (2003)
- Markel Susaeta (2005)
- Anaitz Arbilla (2005)
- Beñat (2005)
- Iago Herrerín (2006)
- Eneko Bóveda (2006)
- Iñigo Pérez (2006)
- Mikel San José (2007)
- **Yuri Berchiche** (2007)
- Isma López (2007)
- Ander Iturraspe (2007)
- Javier Eraso (2008)
- Iker Muniain (2009)
- Jon Aurtenetxe (2010)
- Unai Bustinza (2011)
- **Iñigo Ruiz de Galarreta** (2011)
- **Aymeric Laporte** (2011)
- Kepa Arrizabalaga (2012)
- **Iñaki Williams** (2013)
- Unai López (2013)
- Álex Remiro (2013)
- **Yeray Álvarez** (2013)
- Iñigo Córdoba (2014)
- **Unai Simón** (2014)
- Asier Villalibre (2014)
- Unai Núñez (2015)
- **Gorka Guruzeta** (2015)
- **Beñat Prados** (2018)
- **Aitor Paredes** (2018)
- Unai Vencedor (2018)
- **Oihan Sancet** (2018)
- **Nico Williams** (2019)
- Julen Agirrezabala (2019)
- **Nico Serrano** (2020)
- **Unai Gómez** (2021)
- **Mikel Jauregizar** (2022)

== Season to season (Juvenil A) ==
=== Superliga / Liga de Honor sub-19 ===
Double-winning seasons shown in bold

Season	Level	Group	Position	Copa del Rey Juvenil	Notes
1986–87	1		4th	Runners-up	
1987–88	1		3rd	Semi-final	
1988–89	1		1st	Runners-up	
1989–90	1		6th	Round of 16	
1990–91	1		6th	Round of 16	
**1991–92**	1		**1st**	**Winners**	
1992–93	1		7th	Semi-final	
1993–94	1		4th	Round of 16	
1994–95	1		3rd	Quarter-final	

=== División de Honor Juvenil ===
Seasons with two or more trophies shown in bold

*Season*	Level	Group	Position	Copa del Rey Juv.	Copa de Campeones	Europe/notes
1995–96	1	2	1st	Semi-final	3rd in group of 3	—N/a
1996–97	1	2	2nd	Round of 16	N/A	—N/a
1997–98	1	2	2nd	Round of 16	N/A	—N/a
1998–99	1	2	3rd	Quarter-final	N/A	—N/a
1999–00	1	2	2nd	Semi-final	N/A	—N/a
2000–01	1	2	2nd	Quarter-final	N/A	—N/a
2001–02	1	2	3rd	Semi-final	N/A	—N/a
2002–03	1	2	1st	Round of 16	2nd in group of 3	—N/a
2003–04	1	2	1st	Quarter-final	2nd in group of 3	—N/a
2004–05	1	2	2nd	Quarter-final	N/A	—N/a
2005–06	1	2	2nd	Quarter-final	N/A	—N/a
2006–07	1	2	5th	N/A	N/A	—N/a
2007–08	1	2	4th	N/A	N/A	—N/a
2008–09	1	2	1st	Runners-up	2nd in group of 3	—N/a
**2009–10**	1	2	**1st**	**Winners**	2nd in group of 3	—N/a
2010–11	1	2	1st	Quarter-final	Quarter-final	—N/a
2011–12	1	2	3rd	Round of 16	N/A	N/A
2012–13	1	2	1st	Runners-up	Quarter-final	4th in Group stage
2013–14	1	II	4th	N/A	N/A	N/A
2014–15	1	II	2nd	Round of 16	N/A	3rd in Group stage
2015–16	1	II	1st	Quarter-final	Quarter-final	N/A
2016–17	1	II	3rd	N/A	N/A	N/A
2017–18	1	II	1st	Semi-final	Quarter-final	N/A
2018–19	1	II	7th	N/A	N/A	N/A
2019–20 (Note: In March 2020, all fixtures were suspended due to the COVID-19 pandemic in Spain. On 6 May 2020, the Royal Spanish Football Federation announced the premature end of the leagues, revoking all relegations, declaring each divisional leader as champion and cancelling the Copa del Rey Juvenil and the Copa de Campeones for the season.)	1	II	1st	N/A	N/A	N/A
2020–21	1	II-B/C	1st/1st	N/A (Note: Copa del Rey Juvenil not held in 2020–21.)	Quarter-final	N/A (Note: UEFA Youth League not held in 2020–21.)
2021–22	1	II	1st	Round of 16	Runners-up	N/A
2022–23	1	II	1st	Semi-final	Semi-final	N/A
2023–24	1	II	1st	Round of 32	Quarter-final	N/A
2024–25	1	II	1st	Quarter-final	Quarter-final	N/A

== Honours ==
National competitions

- División de Honor (Group II): (regional league)
  - 7 1977, 1978, 1979, 1981, 1983, 1984, 1986 (Liga Nacional Juvenil 1975–1986)
  - 15 1996, 2003, 2004, 2009, 2010, 2011, 2013, 2016, 2018, 2020, 2021, 2022, 2023, 2024, 2025 (current format since 1995)
- Copa de Campeones:
  - 2 1989, 1992 (Superliga Juvenil / Liga de Honor Sub-19, single league, 1986–1995)
  - 0 (current format since 1995)
  - Runners-up 2022
- Copa del Rey: (since 1951)
  - 9 times winners 1963, 1964, 1965, 1966, 1967, 1970, 1984, 1992, 2010
  - 8 times runners-up, recently 2009 and 2013

== See also ==
- Athletic Club senior team
- Bilbao Athletic reserve team
- CD Basconia affiliate/farm club
