= 2025 Copa del Rey Juvenil =

Tournament details
- Country: Spain
- Teams: 32

Final positions
- Champions: Barcelona (19th title)
- Runners-up: Real Zaragoza

Tournament statistics
- Matches played: 31

The 2025 Copa del Rey Juvenil was the 73rd staging of the Copa del Rey Juvenil de Fútbol, the national knockout tournament for youth (under-19) football in Spain.

== Format ==
The number of entrants remained at 32, as it had been since the expansion of the tournament in 2022 edition; the teams were invited based on their positions at the halfway stage in the season in the División de Honor Juvenil de Fútbol (top four in each of the seven groups, plus four highest-ranked 5th-placed), with the Copa del Rey being completed over several months in the second half of the season. Each round consisted of single matches played to a finish.

In this edition a fixed draw and seeding system was used, with the 1st-ranked teams playing the 4th- and 5th-ranked etc., and the potential path to the final for each team set before the opening round.

== Matches ==
=== Round of 32 ===
Played between 11 and 12 January 2025.

Team 1	Score	Team 2
Betis	1–0	Real Murcia
Valencia	3–2	Racing Santander
Osasuna	1–2 (Note: After extra time)	Valladolid
Arucas	2–4	Mallorca
Las Palmas	4–0	Real Oviedo
Deportivo La Coruña	3–0	Sporting
Vasconia	1–3	Damm
Atlético Madrid	4–1	Burgos
Athletic Bilbao	5–1	Danok Bat
Espanyol	1–4	Granada
Sevilla	1–1 (Note: After extra time; Villarreal win 3–2 in penalty shootout.)	Villarreal
Celta Vigo	1–2	Real Zaragoza
Elche	4–0	Viera
Tenerife	2–5	Málaga
Real Madrid	2–1	Levante
Barcelona	2–1	Real Sociedad

=== Round of 16 ===
Played between 29 and 30 January 2025.

Team 1	Score	Team 2
Real Zaragoza	4–3	Villarreal
Atlético Madrid	2–1	Valladolid
Valencia	0–0 (Note: After extra time; Granada win 4–3 in penalty shootout.)	Granada
Athletic Bilbao	1–0	Deportivo La Coruña
Betis	6–1	Real Madrid
Málaga	3–2	Mallorca
Las Palmas	2–1	Elche
Barcelona	1–1 (Note: After extra time; Barcelona win 4–3 in penalty shootout.)	Damm

=== Quarter-finals ===
Played on 19 February 2025.

Team 1	Score	Team 2
Real Zaragoza	2–1	Málaga
Betis	3–2	Atlético Madrid
Barcelona	2–1	Athletic Bilbao
Las Palmas	3–0	Granada

=== Semi-finals ===
Played between 12 and 13 March 2025. The semi-finals and final were each played over one leg at a mini-tournament in a single location (in this instance, in Villanueva de la Serena, Province of Badajoz).

Team 1	Score	Team 2
Las Palmas	0–1 (Note: After extra time)	Real Zaragoza
Barcelona	2–0	Betis

== Final ==
16 March 2025
11:00

Barcelona	5 – 0	Real Zaragoza
Pradas 15'; Hernández 17' 56'; Alba 31' 66'

Municipal Villanovense
Referee: Víctor Manuel Broncano Suárez

Barcelona	Zaragoza

== See also ==
- 2006 Copa del Rey Juvenil (final played between same teams)
- 2024–25 División de Honor Juvenil de Fútbol
