= Lucas Núñez =

Spanish footballer (born 2006)

Personal information
- Full name: Lucas Núñez Ramírez
- Date of birth: 18 March 2006 (age 20)
- Place of birth: Alicante, Spain
- Height: 1.83 m (6 ft 0 in)
- Position: Midfielder

Team information
- Current team: Eibar (on loan from Valencia)
- Number: 28

Youth career
- Carolinas
- Elche
- 2017–2025: Valencia

Senior career*
Years	Team	Apps	(Gls)
2024–2026	Valencia B	44	(0)
2025–	Valencia	0	(0)
2026–	→ Eibar (loan)	1	(0)
- * Club domestic league appearances and goals as of 23 August 2026

Lucas Núñez Ramírez (born 18 March 2006) is a Spanish professional footballer who plays as a midfielder for SD Eibar, on loan from Valencia CF.

== Career ==
Born in Alicante, Valencian Community, Núñez joined Valencia CF's youth sides in 2017, aged 11, after representing Elche CF and SCD Carolinas. He made his senior debut with the reserves on 22 December 2024, coming on as a second-half substitute for Pablo López in a 1–1 Segunda Federación away draw against CE Sabadell FC.

After quickly establishing himself as a starter for the B-team, Núñez renewed his link with the Che on 23 July 2025. He made his first team debut on 28 October, replacing Baptiste Santamaria in a 5–0 away routing of UD Maracena, for the season's Copa del Rey, also providing the assist to Luis Rioja's fourth goal.

On 26 July 2026, Núñez was loaned to Segunda División side SD Eibar for one year. He made his professional debut on 23 August, replacing Aleix Garrido late into a 1–0 home win over Real Valladolid.
