= 1988–89 Superliga Juvenil de Fútbol =

Superliga Juvenil
- Season: 1988–89
- Champions: Athletic Bilbao; 1st title
- Relegated: Sant Gabriel; Atlético Malagueño; Zaragoza
- Matches: 256
- Biggest home win: Real Madrid 8–0 Sant Gabriel (30 October 1988)
- Biggest away win: Las Palmas 0–8 Barcelona (2 October 1988)
- Highest scoring: Las Palmas 0–8 Barcelona (2 October 1988); Real Madrid 8–0 Sant Gabriel (30 October 1988); Real Madrid 7–1 Espanyol (27 November 1988); Real Madrid 6–2 Kelme (8 January 1989); Athletic Bilbao 6–2 Zaragoza (9 April 1989); Athletic Bilbao 6–2 Barcelona (23 April 1989)

The 1988–89 División de Honor Juvenil de Fútbol, also known as Superliga Juvenil, was the third season since its establishment.

== League table ==
Pos	Team	Pld	W	D	L	GF	GA	GD	Pts	Qualification or relegation
1	Athletic Bilbao	30	19	6	5	61	28	+33	44	Champion
2	Osasuna	30	18	5	7	65	37	+28	41	
3	Real Madrid	30	18	4	8	75	33	+42	40	
4	Betis	30	15	8	7	61	42	+19	38	
5	Atlético Madrid	30	14	9	7	37	35	+2	37	
6	Barcelona	30	13	6	11	64	41	+23	32	
7	Sevilla	30	13	5	12	34	35	−1	31	
8	Espanyol	30	10	7	13	44	54	−10	27	
9	Aurrerá Vitoria	30	10	6	14	34	45	−11	26	
10	Valencia	30	9	6	15	31	49	−18	24	
11	Murcia	30	9	6	15	26	41	−15	24	
12	Kelme	30	9	6	15	40	55	−15	24	
13	Las Palmas	30	7	10	13	44	59	−15	24	
14	Sant Gabriel	30	10	4	16	40	58	−18	24	Relegation to Liga Nacional
15	Atlético Malagueño	30	8	7	15	24	40	−16	23	Relegation to Liga Nacional
16	Zaragoza	30	9	3	18	41	69	−28	21	Relegation to Liga Nacional

Source: AREFE
Rules for classification: 1) Points; 2) Goal difference; 3) Number of goals scored

== See also ==
- 1989 Copa del Rey Juvenil
