= Gerónimo Spina =

Argentine association football player (born 2005)

Personal information
- Date of birth: 9 February 2005 (age 21)
- Place of birth: La Plata, Argentina
- Height: 1.87 m (6 ft 2 in)
- Position: Centre-back

Team information
- Current team: Jong Ajax

Youth career
- 2017–2023: Estudiantes de la Plata
- 2023–2024: Atlético Madrid

Senior career*
Years	Team	Apps	(Gls)
2024–2026	Atlético Madrid B	28	(0)
2026–	Jong Ajax	4	(0)

International career^{‡}
2024	Argentina U20	1	(0)
- * Club domestic league appearances and goals as of 18 September 2026 ‡ National team caps and goals as of 14 November 2024

Gerónimo Spina (born 9 February 2005) is an Argentine footballer who plays as a centre-back for Eerste Divisie side Jong Ajax, the reserve team of Ajax.

== Early life ==
Spina joined Estudiantes de la Plata in 2017.

== Career ==
Spina had become captain of his age-group team by 18 years-old and had begun training with the reserves at Estudiantes de la Plata, when the club in July 2023 announced he was leaving them in order to join Spanish side Atletico Madrid. The club vice-president Juan Sebastian Veron reportedly tried to intervene and persuade his family that Spina should stay, but to no avail. As a youth player with no professional contract, Atletico reportedly had to pay €100,000 compensation for Spina's services.

In September 2026, Spina joined Dutch club AFC Ajax on a two-year contract to link-up initially with the Jong Ajax squad.

== Style of play ==
Spina has been described as a left-sided central defender.
