= 1989–90 Superliga Juvenil de Fútbol =

Superliga Juvenil
- Season: 1989–90
- Champions: R. Madrid
- Relegated: Kelme; Murcia

The 1989–90 División de Honor Juvenil de Fútbol, also known as Superliga Juvenil, was the fourth season since its establishment.

== League table ==
| Pos | Team | Pld | W | D | L | GF | GA | GD | Pts | Qualification or relegation |
|---|---|---|---|---|---|---|---|---|---|---|
| 1 | Real Madrid | 28 | 17 | 5 | 6 | 61 | 30 | +31 | 39 | Champion |
| 2 | Betis | 28 | 18 | 3 | 7 | 53 | 28 | +25 | 39 | |
| 3 | Barcelona | 28 | 15 | 5 | 8 | 53 | 39 | +14 | 35 | |
| 4 | Valencia | 28 | 12 | 9 | 7 | 35 | 22 | +13 | 33 | |
| 5 | Sevilla | 28 | 12 | 7 | 9 | 34 | 32 | +2 | 31 | |
| 6 | Athletic Bilbao | 28 | 12 | 6 | 10 | 46 | 31 | +15 | 30 | |
| 7 | Osasuna | 28 | 11 | 8 | 9 | 42 | 39 | +3 | 30 | |
| 8 | Rayo Vallecano | 28 | 11 | 7 | 10 | 25 | 33 | −8 | 29 | |
| 9 | Espanyol | 28 | 11 | 6 | 11 | 34 | 39 | −5 | 28 | |
| 10 | Atlético Madrid | 28 | 10 | 7 | 11 | 33 | 30 | +3 | 27 | |
| 11 | Las Palmas | 28 | 12 | 3 | 13 | 42 | 44 | −2 | 27 | |
| 12 | Damm | 28 | 9 | 7 | 12 | 29 | 37 | −8 | 25 | |
| 13 | Aurrerá Vitoria | 28 | 5 | 10 | 13 | 23 | 36 | −13 | 20 | |
| 14 | Kelme | 28 | 5 | 5 | 18 | 28 | 62 | −34 | 15 | Relegation to Liga Nacional |
| 15 | Murcia | 28 | 4 | 4 | 20 | 28 | 63 | −35 | 12 | Relegation to Liga Nacional |

Source: AREFE
Rules for classification: 1) Points; 2) Goal difference; 3) Number of goals scored

== See also ==
- 1990 Copa del Rey Juvenil
