= Joaquín Valerio =

Spanish footballer

Personal information
- Full name: Joaquín Enrique Valerio Olivera
- Date of birth: 12 January 1973 (age 53)
- Place of birth: Badalona, Spain
- Height: 1.94 m (6 ft 4 in)
- Position: Goalkeeper

Youth career
- Damm
- Real Madrid

Senior career*
Years	Team	Apps	(Gls)
1992–1995	Castilla	56	(0)
1995–1996	Hércules	16	(0)
1996–1997	Albacete	35	(0)
1997–2001	Betis	17	(0)
2001–2002	Elche	38	(0)
2002–2003	Tenerife	24	(0)
2003–2007	Almería	97	(0)
2007–2008	Elche	4	(0)
2008–2011	Poli Ejido	69	(0)
Total		356	(0)
- * Club domestic league appearances and goals

Joaquín Enrique Valerio Olivera (born 12 January 1973) is a Spanish former professional footballer who played as a goalkeeper.

== Club career ==
Born in Badalona, Barcelona, Catalonia, Valerio began his senior career with Real Madrid Castilla, going on to represent Hércules – with whom he won the Segunda División title in 1996– and Albacete. From 1997 to 2001 he was a part of Real Betis, playing 12 La Liga games (his first being on 1 November 1997 in a 2–3 home loss against Atlético Madrid, coming on as a substitute for Toni Prats who had been sent off in the 20th minute); the 2000–01 season was spent in the second division, as both Betis and Sevilla were promoted.

After one campaign each in the Segunda División B and the second tier, with Elche and Tenerife respectively, Valerio signed with Almería in August 2003. In 2006–07 he appeared in four matches for the Andalusians, backing up first-choice Sander Westerveld as the club achieved a first ever top-flight promotion.

Valerio returned to Elche in October 2007. After a single season, he joined third division side Polideportivo Ejido, being regularly used during a three-year spell and retiring in June 2011 aged 38.
