= Jon Xabier Vidal =

Spanish footballer

Jonxa Vidal
Personal information
- Full name: Jon Xabier Vidal Alonso
- Date of birth: 20 July 1991 (age 35)
- Place of birth: Leioa, Spain
- Height: 1.72 m (5 ft 7 1/2 in)
- Position: Midfielder

Team information
- Current team: Arenas Getxo

Youth career
- 2001–2002: Leioa
- 2002–2010: Athletic Bilbao

Senior career*
Years	Team	Apps	(Gls)
2010–2011	Basconia	30	(1)
2011–2014	Bilbao Athletic	83	(13)
2014–2015	Barakaldo	36	(4)
2015–2016	Cartagena	15	(1)
2016–2017	Guijuelo	44	(5)
2017–	Arenas Getxo	10	(3)
- * Club domestic league appearances and goals as of 29 October 2017

Jon Xabier 'Jonxa' Vidal Alonso (born 20 July 1991) is a Spanish footballer who plays for Arenas Club de Getxo as a midfielder.

== Club career ==
Born in Leioa, Biscay, Vidal joined Athletic Bilbao's youth setup in 2002, aged 11. On 28 November 2012 he made his debut with the first team, coming on as a substitute for fellow youth graduate Álvaro Peña in the 85th minute of a 0–2 away win against Hapoel Ironi Kiryat Shmona F.C. in that season's UEFA Europa League.

Vidal spent three seasons with the reserves in the Segunda División B before being released in May 2014. On 7 July he moved to neighbours Barakaldo CF, also in the third level. He scored four goals in his only season with Barakaldo, before joining FC Cartagena in July 2015.
