= Andranik Hakobyan (footballer) =

Armenian footballer (born 2005)

Personal information
- Full name: Andranik Hakobyan Marukyan
- Date of birth: 4 October 2005 (age 21)
- Place of birth: Sedaví, Spain
- Height: 1.87 m (6 ft 2 in)
- Position: Centre-back

Youth career
- 2013–2020: Sedaví CF
- 2020–2021: Colegio Salgui EDE
- 2022–2024: Elche
- 2024: Valencia

Senior career*
Years	Team	Apps	(Gls)
2024–2026	Alavés C	0	(0)
2025–2026	→ BKMA Yerevan (loan)	5	(0)

International career^{‡}
2025–	Armenia U-21	7	(0)
- * Club domestic league appearances and goals as of 00:15 (UTC) 25 October 2025 ‡ National team caps and goals as of 1 October 2026

Andranik Hakobyan Marukyan (Armenian: Անդրանիկ Հակոբյան Մարուքյան; born 4 October 2005) is a footballer who last played as a defender for BKMA Yerevan. Born in Spain, he is an Armenia youth international.

== Club career ==
He was born in the Valencian Community area of Spain. He was in the youth system at Elche. After also training with Villareal, he joined the youth set-up at Valencia in February 2024, signing a one-year contract with the option of a further two.

On 1 August 2025, Hakobyan went on loan to BKMA Yerevan.

== Style of play ==
He primarily plays as a central defender, but can also play at fullback.

== International career ==
An Armenian youth international. He received his first call-up to the senior Armenia national football team in May 2024 ahead of friendly matches against Slovenia on June 4 and Kazakhstan on June 7.
