= José Izquierdo (footballer, born 1980) =

Spanish footballer

Personal information
- Full name: José Izquierdo Martínez
- Date of birth: 3 August 1980 (age 46)
- Place of birth: Arnedo, Spain
- Height: 1.76 m (5 ft 9 in)
- Position: Right-back

Youth career
- Osasuna

Senior career*
Years	Team	Apps	(Gls)
1998–2002	Osasuna B	107	(0)
2001–2008	Osasuna	108	(2)
2008–2009	Gimnàstic	20	(0)
2009–2011	Logroñés	57	(0)
2011–2012	Atlético Baleares	29	(0)
Total		321	(2)
- * Club domestic league appearances and goals

José Izquierdo Martínez (born 3 August 1980) is a Spanish former professional footballer who played as a right-back.

== Club career ==
Izquierdo was born in Arnedo, La Rioja. A product of CA Osasuna's youth system, he made his La Liga debut against Villarreal CF on 8 September 2001, in a 3–0 away loss. In the 2003–04 season he played 35 league games, scoring in a 1–1 draw at neighbours Athletic Bilbao.

Released by Osasuna in June 2008 after only totalling 27 appearances in his last three years, Izquierdo signed a one-year contract with Segunda División club Gimnàstic de Tarragona, on 31 August 2008. The following campaign, he dropped down to Segunda División B and returned to his native region, moving to UD Logroñés.

For 2011–12, the 31-year-old Izquierdo continued in the third tier, joining CD Atlético Baleares.
