= 2024–25 División de Honor Juvenil de Fútbol =

División de Honor Juvenil de Fútbol
- Season: 2024–25
- Champions: Betis (Copa de Campeones) (1st title)

The 2024–25 División de Honor Juvenil de Fútbol was the 39th season of the highest-level under-19 football league competition in Spain since its establishment.

== Competition format ==
The format of the competition followed the same pattern as it had since the 1990s. Teams were divided into seven regionalised groups playing each other twice, with the champion of each group and the best runner-up qualifying for the 2025 Copa de Campeones, and four teams in each group relegated to the Liga Nacional.

- The champion of the Copa de Campeones would get a place in the 2025–26 UEFA Youth League (transferable to the runners-up if the winner's senior team also qualified for the UEFA Champions League group stage).
- The 32 teams with the best record across the 7 groups (i.e. top four in each plus four 5th-placed) after the first round of matches were completed qualified for the Copa del Rey Juvenil, which would be played in the second half of the season.

== Regular season ==
Group 1

- Champions: Deportivo La Coruña
- Runners-up: Celta Vigo
- 3rd place: Sporting Gijón

Group 2

- Champions: Athletic Bilbao
- Runners-up: Osasuna
- 3rd place: Real Sociedad

Group 3

- Champions: Barcelona
- Runners-up: Damm
- 3rd place: Mallorca

Group 4

- Champions: Betis
- Runners-up: Sevilla
- 3rd place: Málaga

Group 5

- Champions: Real Madrid
- Runners-up: Atlético Madrid
- 3rd place: Leganés

Group 6

- Champions: Las Palmas
- Runners-up: Tenerife – best ranked runner-up
- 3rd place: Sobradillo

Group 7

- Champions: Valencia
- Runners-up: Levante
- 3rd place: Elche

== Copa de Campeones ==
The quarter-finals were played over two legs at each club's home ground; the semi-finals and final were each played over one leg at a mini-tournament in a single location (in this instance, in Ponferrada).

Quarter-finals

Home	Agg.	Away	1st leg	2nd leg
Tenerife	1–8	Deportivo La Coruña	0–6	1–2
Valencia	5–5 (Note: After extra time; Valencia win 4–3 in penalty shootout.)	Barcelona	2–2	3–3
Las Palmas	3–5	Betis	1–3	2–2
Real Madrid	5–3	Athletic Bilbao	1–1	4–2

Semi-finals

Team 1	Score	Team 2
Real Madrid	1–2	Valencia
Deportivo La Coruña	2–6	Betis

Final

1 June 2025
12:00

Betis	3 – 1	Valencia
Rodrigo 45+3' 64'; Morante 72'		Aimar Blázquez 6'

Estadio El Toralín
Attendance: 1,200
Referee: Omar Álvarez Rodríguez

Betis	Valencia
