= 2023 Copa del Rey Juvenil =

Tournament details
- Country: Spain
- Teams: 32

Final positions
- Champions: Real Madrid (15th title)
- Runners-up: Almería

Tournament statistics
- Matches played: 31

The 2023 Copa del Rey Juvenil was the 71st staging of the Copa del Rey Juvenil de Fútbol, the national knockout tournament for youth (under-19) football in Spain.

== Format ==
32 teams were invited based on their positions in the División de Honor Juvenil de Fútbol at the halfway stage (top four in each of the seven groups, plus four highest-ranked 5th-placed), with the Copa del Rey being completed over several months in the second half of the season. Each round consisted of single matches played to a finish. The first round draw was based on geographical proximity, with teams from each regionalised División de Honor group facing one another in most cases.

== Matches ==
=== Round of 32 ===
Played between 6 and 8 January 2023.

Team 1	Score	Team 2
Real Zaragoza	0–2	Alavés
Real Sociedad	1–2	Antiguoko
Betis	1–0	Sevilla
Las Palmas	3–1	Marítima
Tenerife	1–0	Sobradillo
Almería	2–1	Elche
Deportivo La Coruña	2–1	Celta Vigo
Barcelona	4–1	Damm
Sporting Gijón	3–1	Racing Santander
Cádiz	0–0 (Note: Málaga win in penalty shootout.)	Málaga
Leganés	1–2	Alcorcón
Athletic Bilbao	3–1	Eibar
Atlético Madrid	3–2	Atlético Madrileño
Villarreal	3–0	Espanyol
Real Madrid	1–0	Rayo Vallecano
Valencia	3–2	Levante

=== Round of 16 ===
Played on 25 January 2023.

Team 1	Score	Team 2
Betis	0–3	Las Palmas
Barcelona	0–1	Málaga
Deportivo La Coruña	3–2	Atlético Madrid
Antiguoko	1–2	Sporting Gijón
Real Madrid	3–1	Valencia
Athletic Bilbao	1–0	Alcorcón
Almería	2–1	Alavés
Tenerife	1–2	Villarreal

=== Quarter-finals ===
Played on 15 February 2023.

Team 1	Score	Team 2
Sporting Gijón	0–0 (Note: Athletic win in penalty shootout.)	Athletic Bilbao
Málaga	1–2	Real Madrid
Villarreal	3–4	Deportivo La Coruña
Las Palmas	0–1	Almería

=== Semi-finals ===
Played on 8 March 2023. The semi-finals and final were each played over one leg at a mini-tournament in a single location (in this instance, in León).

Team 1	Score	Team 2
Athletic Bilbao	0–2	Real Madrid
Deportivo La Coruña	1–2	Almería

== Final ==
11 March 2023
15:30

Real Madrid	2 – 1	Almería
Fortuny 7'; Manuel Ángel 17'		Rachad 71'

Estadio Reino de León
Referee: Alejandro Morilla Turrión

Real Madrid	Almería

== See also ==
- 2022–23 División de Honor Juvenil de Fútbol
