= 1987–88 Superliga Juvenil de Fútbol =

Superliga Juvenil
- Season: 1987–88
- Champions: Real Madrid; 2nd title
- Relegated: Racing Santander; Elche; Damm
- Matches played: 256
- Biggest home win: Barcelona 9–0 Elche (17 April 1988)
- Biggest away win: Las Palmas 0–4 Sevilla (1 May 1988)
- Highest scoring: Real Madrid 7–3 Sevilla (7 February 1988)

The 1987–88 Superliga Juvenil de Fútbol season was the second since its establishment.

== League table ==
| Pos | Team | Pld | W | D | L | GF | GA | GD | Pts | Qualification or relegation |
|---|---|---|---|---|---|---|---|---|---|---|
| 1 | Real Madrid | 30 | 21 | 6 | 3 | 72 | 22 | +50 | 48 | Champion |
| 2 | Barcelona | 30 | 21 | 5 | 4 | 80 | 28 | +52 | 47 | |
| 3 | Athletic Bilbao | 30 | 21 | 3 | 6 | 59 | 29 | +30 | 45 | |
| 4 | Betis | 30 | 11 | 11 | 8 | 44 | 35 | +9 | 33 | |
| 5 | Atlético Madrid | 30 | 12 | 8 | 10 | 42 | 35 | +7 | 32 | |
| 6 | Murcia | 30 | 10 | 9 | 11 | 29 | 33 | −4 | 29 | |
| 7 | Osasuna | 30 | 11 | 6 | 13 | 44 | 39 | +5 | 28 | |
| 8 | Zaragoza | 30 | 10 | 7 | 13 | 49 | 45 | +4 | 27 | |
| 9 | Kelme | 30 | 11 | 5 | 14 | 36 | 55 | −19 | 27 | |
| 10 | Espanyol | 30 | 9 | 8 | 13 | 28 | 33 | −5 | 26 | |
| 11 | Sevilla | 30 | 8 | 9 | 13 | 40 | 50 | −10 | 25 | |
| 12 | Aurrerá Vitoria | 30 | 7 | 11 | 12 | 33 | 46 | −13 | 25 | |
| 13 | Las Palmas | 30 | 8 | 7 | 15 | 36 | 64 | −28 | 23 | |
| 14 | Racing Santander | 30 | 6 | 10 | 14 | 33 | 41 | −8 | 22 | Relegation to Liga Nacional |
| 15 | Elche | 30 | 7 | 8 | 15 | 27 | 62 | −35 | 22 | Relegation to Liga Nacional |
| 16 | Damm | 30 | 7 | 7 | 16 | 29 | 64 | −35 | 21 | Relegation to Liga Nacional |

Source: AREFE
Rules for classification: 1) Points; 2) Goal difference; 3) Number of goals scored

== See also ==
- 1988 Copa del Rey Juvenil
