= José Manuel Morales =

Spanish footballer

Personal information
- Full name: José Manuel Morales Ramos
- Date of birth: 19 February 1991 (age 35)
- Place of birth: Seville, Spain
- Height: 1.76 m (5 ft 9 in)
- Position: Right back

Youth career
- Sevilla

Senior career*
Years	Team	Apps	(Gls)
2008–2012	Sevilla B	59	(0)
2012–2013	Getafe B	16	(0)
2013–2015	Toledo	63	(0)
2015–2016	Europa	18	(0)
2016	Cacereño	0	(0)
2016–2017	Alcalá	12	(0)
2017	Arcos	10	(0)
2018–2019	Sant Rafel	8	(0)
2019–2020	Ciudad Lucena	5	(0)
- * Club domestic league appearances and goals as of 26 February 2020

José Manuel Morales Ramos (born 19 February 1991) is a Spanish footballer who plays as a right back.

== Club career ==
Born in Seville, Andalusia, Morales finished his youth career with Sevilla FC's academy. He made his professional debut with the reserves on 16 November 2008, starting in a 0–2 home loss against Elche CF in the Segunda División.

In July 2012, Morales signed with another reserve team, Getafe CF B of the Segunda División B. The following season, he joined fellow league club CD Toledo.

Morales continued to compete in the lower divisions the following years, representing CD Toledo, CP Cacereño, CD Alcalá, Arcos CF and CF Sant Rafel, aside from a spell at Gibraltar's Europa FC.
