= 2023–24 División de Honor Juvenil de Fútbol =

División de Honor Juvenil de Fútbol
- Season: 2023–24
- Champions: Atlético Madrid (Copa de Campeones) (3rd title)

The 2023–24 División de Honor Juvenil de Fútbol was the 38th season of the highest-level under-19 football league competition in Spain since its establishment.

== Competition format ==
The format of the competition followed the same pattern as it had since the 1990s. Teams were divided into seven regionalised groups playing each other twice, with the champion of each group and the best runner-up qualifying for the 2024 Copa de Campeones, and four teams in each group relegated to the Liga Nacional.

- The champion of the Copa de Campeones would get a place in the 2024–25 UEFA Youth League (transferable to the runners-up if the winners senior team also qualified for the UEFA Champions League group stage).
- The 32 teams with the best record across the 7 groups (i.e. top four in each plus four 5th-placed) after the first round of matches were completed qualified for the Copa del Rey Juvenil, which would be played in the second half of the season.

== Regular season ==
Group 1

- Champions: Deportivo La Coruña
- Runners-up: Racing Santander
- 3rd place: Celta Vigo

Group 2

- Champions: Athletic Bilbao
- Runners-up: Real Sociedad
- 3rd place: Osasuna

Group 3

- Champions: Mallorca
- Runners-up: Espanyol
- 3rd place: Barcelona

Group 4

- Champions: Sevilla
- Runners-up: Betis – best ranked runner-up
- 3rd place: Granada

Group 5

- Champions: Atlético Madrid
- Runners-up: Real Madrid
- 3rd place: Leganés

Group 6

- Champions: Las Palmas
- Runners-up: Tenerife
- 3rd place: La Oliva

Group 7

- Champions: Levante
- Runners-up: Atlético Madrileño
- 3rd place: Villarreal

== Copa de Campeones ==
The quarter-finals were played over two legs at each club's home ground; the semi-finals and final were each played over one leg at a mini-tournament in a single location (in this instance, in Nerja).

Quarter-finals

Home	Agg.	Away	1st leg	2nd leg
Deportivo La Coruña	0–2	Sevilla	0–0	0–2
Levante	2–3	Atlético Madrid	1–1	1–2
Athletic Bilbao	1–2	Mallorca	1–0	0–2
Las Palmas	0–5	Betis	0–4	0–2

Semi-finals

Team 1	Score	Team 2
Mallorca	1–2	Atlético Madrid
Sevilla	1–3	Betis

Final

26 May 2024

Atlético Madrid	1 – 0	Betis
Rayane 45'

Enrique López Cuenca Sports Stadium
Referee: Fulgencio Madrid Martínez

Atlético Madrid	Betis
