= 1986–87 Superliga Juvenil de Fútbol =

Superliga Juvenil
- Season: 1986–87
- Champions: Real Madrid; 1st title
- Relegated: Valladolid; Real Sociedad; Cádiz; Levante
- Matches played: 255
- Biggest home win: Damm 6–0 Real Sociedad (5 October 1986)
- Biggest away win: Las Palmas 0–4 Athletic Bilbao (21 September 1986); Barcelona 0–4 Real Madrid (2 November 1986); Espanyol 1–5 Real Madrid (8 March 1987)
- Highest scoring: Barcelona 5–2 Levante (21 September 1986); Valladolid 6–1 Sevilla (28 September 1986); Real Madrid 5–2 Sevilla (12 October 1986); Sevilla 5–2 Murcia (19 October 1986); Valladolid 5–2 Levante (9 November 1986); Espanyol 2–5 Sevilla (30 November 1986); Damm 3–4 Real Madrid (15 February 1987); Damm 4–3 Betis (8 March 1987)

The 1986–87 Superliga Juvenil de Fútbol season was the first since its establishment.

== League table ==
Pos	Team	Pld	W	D	L	GF	GA	GD	Pts	Qualification or relegation
1	Real Madrid	30	22	3	5	70	31	+39	47	Champion
2	Barcelona	30	18	8	4	58	35	+23	44	
3	Valladolid	30	13	8	9	55	36	+19	34	Relegation to Liga Nacional
4	Athletic Bilbao	30	12	10	8	43	30	+13	34	
5	Sevilla	30	13	7	10	54	52	+2	33	
6	Osasuna	30	11	10	9	46	46	0	32	
7	Betis	30	12	6	12	47	44	+3	30	
8	Espanyol	30	12	5	13	44	50	−6	29	
9	Racing Santander	29	11	6	12	46	44	+2	28	
10	Damm	30	12	4	14	49	63	−14	28	
11	Kelme	30	10	6	14	36	45	−9	26	
12	Murcia	30	9	7	14	39	46	−7	25	
13	Las Palmas	29	11	3	15	37	44	−7	25	
14	Real Sociedad	30	10	5	15	36	48	−12	25	Relegation to Liga Nacional
15	Cádiz	30	7	8	15	42	56	−14	22	Relegation to Liga Nacional
16	Levante	30	5	6	19	32	64	−32	16	Relegation to Liga Nacional

Source: AREFE
Rules for classification: 1) Points; 2) Goal difference; 3) Number of goals scored

== See also ==
- 1987 Copa del Rey Juvenil
