= 2022–23 División de Honor Juvenil de Fútbol =

División de Honor Juvenil de Fútbol
- Season: 2022–23
- Champions: Real Madrid (Copa de Campeones)

The 2022–23 División de Honor Juvenil de Fútbol was the 37th season of the highest-level under-19 football league competition in Spain since its establishment.

== Competition format ==
The format of the competition followed the same pattern as it had since the 1990s. Teams were divided into seven regionalised groups playing each other twice, with the champion of each group and the best runner-up qualifying for the 2023 Copa de Campeones, and four teams in each group relegated to the Liga Nacional.

- The champion of the Copa de Campeones would get a place in the 2023–24 UEFA Youth League (not transferable if they also qualified due to the club's senior team reaching the UEFA Champions League group stage).
- The 32 teams with the best record across the 7 groups (i.e. top four in each plus four 5th-placed) after the first round of matches were completed qualified for the Copa del Rey Juvenil, which would be played in the second half of the season.

== Regular season ==
Group 1

- Champions: Celta Vigo
- Runners-up: Deportivo La Coruña
- 3rd place: Sporting Gijón

Group 2

- Champions: Athletic Bilbao
- Runners-up: Real Sociedad
- 3rd place: Eibar

Group 3

- Champions: Barcelona
- Runners-up: Real Zaragoza
- 3rd place: Mallorca

Group 4

- Champions: Betis
- Runners-up: Sevilla
- 3rd place: Almería

Group 5

- Champions: Real Madrid
- Runners-up: Atlético Madrid – best ranked runner-up
- 3rd place: Rayo Alcobendas

Group 6

- Champions: Las Palmas
- Runners-up: Tenerife
- 3rd place: Marítima

Group 7

- Champions: Valencia
- Runners-up: Atlético Madrileño
- 3rd place: Villarreal

== Copa de Campeones ==
The quarter-finals were played over two legs at each club's home ground; the semi-finals and final were each played over one leg at a mini-tournament in a single location (in this instance, in Las Rozas de Madrid).

Quarter-finals

Home	Agg.	Away	1st leg	2nd leg
Las Palmas	9–3	Celta Vigo	5–0	3–4
Valencia	3–4	Betis	1–3	2–1
Atlético Madrid	2–4	Real Madrid	0–2	2–2
Athletic Bilbao	1–0	Barcelona	0–0	1–0

Semi-finals

Team 1	Score	Team 2
Betis	2–0	Athletic Bilbao
Real Madrid	2–1	Las Palmas

Final

20 May 2023

Betis	1 – 3	Real Madrid
Van der Putten 42'		Serrano 13'; Gonzalo 81' 86'

La Ciudad del Fútbol
Referee: Manuel Ramírez Marco

Betis	Real Madrid

== See also ==
- 2023 Copa del Rey Juvenil
