= 2018 Copa del Rey Juvenil =

Tournament details
- Country: Spain
- Teams: 16

Final positions
- Champions: Atlético Madrid
- Runners-up: Real Madrid

Tournament statistics
- Matches played: 29
- Goals scored: 103 (3.55 per match)

The 2018 Copa del Rey Juvenil is the 68th staging of the Copa del Rey Juvenil de Fútbol. The competition started on May 13, 2018.

== First round ==
The top two teams from each group of the 2017–18 División de Honor Juvenil de Fútbol and the two best third-placed teams were drawn into a two-game best aggregate score series. The first leg was played on May 13 and 14 and the return leg on May 19 and 20.

Team 1	Agg.	Team 2	1st leg	2nd leg
Sporting Gijón	3–5	Real Sociedad	3–1	0–4
Deportivo La Coruña	3–8	Athletic Bilbao	3–4	0–4
Las Palmas	1–9	Atlético Madrid	1–2	0–7
Tenerife	1–3	Rayo Vallecano	0–1	1–2
Atlético Madrileño	2–4	San Félix	1–1	1–3
Valencia	4–1	Málaga	2–0	2–1
Barcelona	5–1	Betis	3–1	2–0
Zaragoza	2–2 (a)	Real Madrid	1–2	1–0

== Quarterfinals ==
The eight winners from the first round advanced to quarterfinals, that were played in a two-game series. The first legs were played on May 27 and the second on June 2 and 3.

Team 1	Agg.	Team 2	1st leg	2nd leg
Valencia	4–5	Real Madrid	1–2	3–3
Atlético Madrid	3–1	Barcelona	0–0	3–1
Athletic Bilbao	2–1	Rayo Vallecano	2–1	0–0
Real Sociedad	5–7	San Félix	1–2	4–5

== Semifinals ==
The four winners from the quarterfinals advanced to semifinals, that were played in a two-game series. The first legs were played on June 10 and the second legs were played on June 17.

Team 1	Agg.	Team 2	1st leg	2nd leg
Real Madrid	7–5	San Félix	6–1	1–4
Atlético Madrid	4–1	Athletic Bilbao	3–0	1–1

== Final ==
Team 1	Score	Team 2
Atlético Madrid	3–1	Real Madrid

== See also ==
- 2016 Copa del Rey Juvenil (final played between same clubs)
- 2017 Copa del Rey Juvenil (final played between same clubs)
- 2017–18 División de Honor Juvenil de Fútbol
