= 2020–21 División de Honor Juvenil de Fútbol =

División de Honor Juvenil de Fútbol
- Season: 2020–21
- Champions: Deportivo La Coruña (Copa de Campeones)

The 2020–21 División de Honor Juvenil de Fútbol was the 35th season of the highest-level under-19 football league competition in Spain since its establishment.

== Competition format ==
The format of the competition was affected by restrictions of the COVID-19 pandemic in Spain, with two phases of smaller groups: the first phase in close geographical clusters and the second phase divided into a championship section and a relegation section; however, the basic premise remained as normal, with the teams still organised into seven regionalised groups with the champion of each group and the best runner-up qualifying for the 2021 Copa de Campeones, and six teams in each group relegated to the Liga Nacional (an increase from the usual four, to address the excess of participants due to relegations being cancelled in the 2019–20 season).

- The Copa del Rey Juvenil was not played in 2021.
- The champion of the Copa de Campeones would get a place in the 2021–22 UEFA Youth League (not transferable if they also qualified due to the club's senior team reaching the UEFA Champions League group stage).

== Regular season ==
Group 1

- Champions: Celta Vigo
- Runners-up: Deportivo La Coruña
- 3rd place: Sporting Gijón

Group 2

- Champions: Athletic Bilbao
- Runners-up: Osasuna
- 3rd place: Alavés

Group 3

- Champions: Barcelona
- Runners-up: Real Zaragoza
- 3rd place: Espanyol

Group 4

- Champions: Málaga
- Runners-up: Sevilla
- 3rd place: Granada

Group 5

- Champions: Atlético Madrid
- Runners-up: Real Madrid – best ranked runner-up
- 3rd place: Real Valladolid

Group 6

- Champions: Las Palmas
- Runners-up: Tenerife
- 3rd place: Marino

Group 7

- Champions: Levante
- Runners-up: Valencia
- 3rd place: Villarreal

== Copa de Campeones ==
The quarter-finals were played over two legs at each club's home ground; the semi-finals and final were each played over one leg at a mini-tournament in a single location (in this instance, in Marbella).

Quarter-finals

Home	Agg.	Away	1st leg	2nd leg
Levante	2–3	Barcelona	1–1	1–2
Real Madrid	4–2	Atlético Madrid	2–1	2–1
Deportivo La Coruña	3–3 (Note: Deportivo won 3–1 in a penalty shootout.)	Las Palmas	2–1	1–2
Málaga	5–3	Athletic Bilbao	2–0	3–3

Semi-finals

Team 1	Score	Team 2
Real Madrid	0–1	Deportivo La Coruña
Barcelona	1–0	Málaga

Final

27 June 2021

Deportivo La Coruña	3 – 1	Barcelona
Mario 22'; Noel 30' 73'		Ilias 26'

Marbella Football Centre
Referee: José David Martínez Montalbán

Deportivo	Barcelona
