= 2005–06 División de Honor Juvenil de Fútbol =

División de Honor Juvenil de Fútbol
- Season: 2005–06

The 2005–06 División de Honor Juvenil de Fútbol season was the 20th since its establishment.

== Copa de Campeones ==
=== Group A ===
Team 1	Score	Team 2
Real Madrid	3 – 0	UD Las Palmas
FC Barcelona	2 – 2	UD Las Palmas
Real Madrid	3 – 0	FC Barcelona

=== Group B ===
Team 1	Score	Team 2
Real Zaragoza	2 – 4	Real Valladolid
Real Betis	1 – 1	Real Zaragoza
Real Valladolid	2 – 1	Real Betis

=== Final ===
Team 1	Score	Team 2
Real Madrid	1–0	Real Valladolid

Copa de Campeones
winners
Real Madrid

==== Details ====
7 May 2006

Real Madrid	1 – 0	Real Valladolid
Mata 57'

Antonio Amilivia, León
Attendance: 4,500
Referee: Turienzo

Real Madrid	Real Valladolid

Real Madrid:
GK	(Spain) Adán
DF	(Spain) Velayos (c)
DF	(Spain) Ortega
DF	(Spain) Parra
DF	(Spain) Mateos
MF	(Spain) Lora
MF	(Spain) Juanmi Callejón
MF	(Spain) Giráldez	(substituted off) 65'
FW	(Spain) Bueno	(substituted off) 84'
FW	(Spain) Granero	(substituted off) 76'
FW	(Spain) Mata	(substituted off) 69'
Substitutes:
FW	(Spain) Rayco		(substituted in) 65'
MF	(Spain) Jordi		(substituted in) 84'
FW	(Spain) Mosquera		(substituted in) 76'
FW	(Spain) José Callejón		(substituted in) 69'
Manager:

Real Valladolid:
GK	(Spain) Manuel
DF	(Spain) Eloy	(substituted off) 76'
DF	(Spain) Aridane
DF	(Spain) Héctor
DF	(Spain) Manu
MF	(Spain) Modrego	(substituted off) 65'
MF	(Spain) Sergio	(substituted off) 61'
MF	(Spain) Calleja
MF	(Spain) Alberto	(substituted off) 46'
FW	(Spain) Víctor
FW	(Spain) Kike
Substitutes:
MF	(Spain) Pablo	(substituted in) 46'
MF	(Spain) Jonathan	(substituted in) 61'
MF	(Spain) Iván	(substituted in) 65'
MF	(Spain) Castro	(substituted in) 76'
Manager:

== See also ==
- 2006 Copa del Rey Juvenil
