= 2009 Copa del Rey Juvenil =

Tournament details
- Country: Spain
- Teams: 16

Final positions
- Champions: Sevilla
- Runners-up: Athletic Club

Tournament statistics
- Matches played: 29

The 2009 Copa del Rey Juvenil was the 59th staging of the tournament. The competition began on 17 May and ended on 27 June with the final.

== First round ==
Team 1	Agg.	Team 2	1st leg	2nd leg
Barcelona	7–1	Villarreal	4–0	3–1
Las Palmas	(a) 2–2	Atlético Madrid	0–1	2–1
Mallorca	1–2	Sevilla	1–0	0–2
Athletic	2–1	Celta Vigo	0–1	2–0
Real Madrid	3–3 (a)	Tenerife	3–1	0–2
Ejido	2–2 (a)	Albacete	2–1	0–1
Deportivo La Coruña	3–0	Real Sociedad	2–0	1–0
Montecarlo (Zaragoza)	1–4	Espanyol	0–3	0–6

== Quarterfinals ==
Team 1	Agg.	Team 2	1st leg	2nd leg
Barcelona	5–3	Albacete	2–3	0–3
Deportivo La Coruña	2–3	Tenerife	1–1	1–2
Espanyol	1–2	Athletic	0–0	1–2
Las Palmas	0–3	Sevilla	0–1	0–2

== Semifinals ==
Team 1	Agg.	Team 2	1st leg	2nd leg
Barcelona	5–6	Athletic	5–3	0–3
Tenerife	1–5	Sevilla	1–1	0–4

== Final ==
27 June 2009
19:30

Athletic Club	2–3 (a.e.t.)	Sevilla
Vidal 38'; Etxaniz 77'	Report	Luis Alberto 75'; Rodri 95' 100'

Municipal Enrique López Cuenca, Nerja
Attendance: 1,000
Referee: Mr. López López

Athletic Club:
GK	(Spain) Villanueva (yellow card)
DF	(Spain) Medina
DF	(Spain) Jon García
DF	(Spain) Aurtenetxe
DF	(Spain) Ramalho
MF	(Spain) Miñes
MF	(Spain) Erik Morán (red card) 117'
MF	(Spain) Uribarren
MF	(Spain) Eraña (yellow card)
MF	(Spain) Vidal
FW	(Spain) Etxaniz
Substitutes:
MF	(Spain) Peña (substituted on) 65' (yellow card)
DF	(Spain) Saborit (substituted on) 86'
DF	(Spain) Bilbo (substituted on) 88' (yellow card)
FW	(Spain) Alkuaz (substituted on) 93'
Manager:
(Spain) Bingen Arostegi

Sevilla:
GK	(Spain) Dani Jiménez
DF	(Spain) Morales (yellow card)
DF	(Spain) Hugo Sánchez (yellow card)
DF	(Spain) Iván Hernández (yellow card) 119' (red card)
DF	(Spain) Luna
MF	(Spain) Álex (substituted off) 53'
MF	(Spain) Salva González (yellow card)
MF	(Spain) Juan Guerra (substituted off) 68'
MF	(Spain) Mario (substituted off) 53'
FW	(Spain) Rodri (yellow card) (substituted off) 109'
FW	(Spain) Luis Alberto
Substitutes:
DF	(Spain) Melo (substituted on) 53'
MF	(Spain) Boris (substituted on) 53' (yellow card) 106' (red card)
MF	(Spain) Francis (substituted on) 68'
FW	(Spain) Gordillo (substituted on) 109'
Manager:
(Spain) Ramón Tejada

Copa del Rey Juvenil
Winners
Sevilla

== See also ==
2008–09 División de Honor Juvenil de Fútbol
