= 2008–09 División de Honor Juvenil de Fútbol =

División de Honor Juvenil de Fútbol
- Season: 2008–09

The 2008–09 División de Honor Juvenil de Fútbol season was the 23rd since its establishment.

== Copa de Campeones ==
=== Group A ===
==== 1st round ====
Team 1	Score	Team 2
Villarreal CF	1–3	Celta de Vigo
Sevilla FC	1–0	Atlético Madrid

==== 2nd round ====
Team 1	Score	Team 2
Celta de Vigo	2–0	Sevilla FC

=== Group B ===
Team 1	Score	Team 2
CD Tenerife	1–2	FC Barcelona
CD Tenerife	2–2	Athletic Bilbao
FC Barcelona	2–1	Athletic Bilbao

=== Final ===
Team 1	Score	Team 2
FC Barcelona	2–0	Celta de Vigo

Copa de Campeones
winners
FC Barcelona

==== Details ====
May 2009

Barcelona	2 – 0	Celta
Jonathan 51' (pen.); Carmona 68'

Municipal Francisco Bonet, Almuñécar
Referee: Jesús Benjumea

Barcelona	RC Celta

BARCELONA:
GK	(Spain) Marc Martínez
DF	(Spain) Martín Montoya
DF	(Spain) Marc Bartra
DF	(Spain) Álex Bolaños
DF	(Spain) Carles Planas
MF	(Spain) Martí Riverola	(substituted off) 86'
MF	(Spain) José Luis	(substituted off) 90'
MF	(Mexico) Jonathan dos Santos	(substituted off) 86'
FW	(Spain) Rubén Rochina
FW	(Spain) Polaco
FW	(Spain) Gerard Zambudio	(substituted off) 53'
Substitutes:
FW	(Spain) Ilie Sánchez		(substituted in) 86'
MF	(Spain) Segarra		(substituted in) 86'
FW	(Equatorial Guinea) Anselmo		(substituted in) 90'
FW	(Spain) Carmona		(substituted in) 53'
Manager:

CELTA:
GK	(Spain) Mario Barreiro
DF	(Spain) Peña
DF	(Spain) Sito	(substituted off) 65'
DF	(Spain) Flo
DF	(Spain) Hugo Mallo
MF	(Spain) Pedro García
MF	(Spain) J. Luque	(substituted off) 56'
MF	(Spain) Pablo Lede
MF	(Spain) Martín	(substituted off) 56'
FW	(Spain) Jota	(substituted off) 80'
FW	(Spain) Toni
Substitutes:
DF	(Spain) Iván Freiría	(substituted in) 65'
MF	(Spain) Rodri	(substituted in) 56'
MF	(Spain) Uru	(substituted in) 56'
FW	(Spain) Óscar	(substituted in) 80'
Manager:

== See also ==
- 2009 Copa del Rey Juvenil
