= 2008 Copa del Rey Juvenil =

Tournament details
- Country: Spain
- Teams: 16

Final positions
- Champions: Sevilla
- Runners-up: Barcelona

Tournament statistics
- Matches played: 29
- Goals scored: 69 (2.38 per match)

The 2008 Copa del Rey Juvenil was the 58th staging of the tournament. The competition began on May 18, 2008 and ended on June 28, 2008 with the final.

== First round ==
Team 1	Agg.	Team 2	1st leg	2nd leg
FC Barcelona	3–1	Real Madrid	2–0	1–1
Real Sociedad	6–3	Deportivo	3–0	3–3
Valladolid	0–1	Celta de Vigo	0–0	0–1
Osasuna	1–1 (a)	Zaragoza	1–1	0–0
Villarreal	5–6	Espanyol	4–2	1–4
Vecindario	(a) 3–3	Betis	2–0	1–3
Las Palmas	2–3	Sevilla	1–0	1–3
Tenerife	1–4	Rayo Vallecano	0–0	1–4

== Quarterfinals ==
Team 1	Agg.	Team 2	1st leg	2nd leg
Sevilla	5–1	Real Sociedad	2–0	3–1
Espanyol	1–3	FC Barcelona	1–1	0–2
Rayo Vallecano	3–2	Vecindario	2–0	1–2
Celta de Vigo	3–0	Zaragoza	3–0	0–0

== Semifinals ==
Team 1	Agg.	Team 2	1st leg	2nd leg
Rayo Vallecano	1–2	Sevilla	1–1	0–1
Celta de Vigo	1–2	FC Barcelona	1–0	0–2

== Final ==
28 June 2008
19:00

Barcelona	0–2	Sevilla
	Report	Nené 16'; Polaco 90+3' (o.g.)

El Montecillo, Aranda de Duero
Attendance: 1,000
Referee: Turienzo Álvarez

FC Barcelona:
GK	(Spain) Rubén Miño
DF	(Spain) Marc Blasco
DF	(Spain) Álex Bolaños
DF	(Spain) Martín Montoya
DF	(Spain) Polaco (yellow card) 71'
MF	(Spain) Andreu Fontàs
MF	(Mexico) Jonathan dos Santos
MF	(Spain) Iago Falque
FW	(Spain) Joselu (substituted off) 67'
FW	(Spain) Rubén Rochina
FW	(Israel) Gai Assulin
Substitutes:
FW	(Spain) Joan Pons (substituted on) 67'
Manager:
(Spain) Álex García

Sevilla:
GK	(Spain) Juan Martín
DF	(Spain) Moisés Jiménez
DF	(Spain) Cala
DF	(Colombia) Bernardo Espinosa
DF	(Spain) Manuel Cantizano (yellow card) 37'
MF	(Spain) Hugo Rodríguez (substituted off) 63'
MF	(Spain) Salva González
MF	(Spain) Jaime (yellow card) 33' (substituted off) 78'
MF	(Spain) José Antonio Ríos
FW	(Spain) Rodri (substituted off) 85'
FW	(Spain) Nené (substituted off) 74'
Substitutes:
DF	(Spain) José Manuel Morales (substituted on) 63'
MF	(Spain) Adrián Pavón (substituted on) 74'
MF	(Spain) Nelson (substituted on) 78'
FW	(Finland) Teemu Pukki (substituted on) 85'
Manager:
(Spain) Ramón Tejada

Copa del Rey Juvenil
Winners
Sevilla
