= 2014 Copa del Rey Juvenil =

Tournament details
- Country: Spain
- Teams: 16

Final positions
- Champions: Sevilla
- Runners-up: Real Madrid

The 2014 Copa del Rey Juvenil is the 64th staging of the Copa del Rey Juvenil de Fútbol. The competition begins on May 18, 2014 and will end on June 29, 2014 with the final.

== First round ==
The top two teams from each group and the two best third-placed teams are drawn into a two-game best aggregate score series. The first leg began the week of May 18 and the return leg the week of May 26.

Team 1	Agg.	Team 2	1st leg	2nd leg
Atlético	5–5 (a)	Tenerife	3–3	2–2
Las Palmas	2–4	Real Madrid	2–0	0–4
Málaga	2–2 (a)	Getafe	0–1	2–1
Levante	2–3	Sevilla	0–1	2–2
Espanyol	4–0	Valencia	1–0	3–0
Danok Bat	2–6	Barcelona	1–0	1–6
Racing Santander	5–4	Huesca	3–2	2–2
Celta	3–7	Real Sociedad	2–3	1–4

== Quarterfinal ==
The eight winners from the first round advance to quarterfinal for a two-game series best aggregate score with the first leg beginning the week of June 1 and returning the week of June 8.

Team 1	Agg.	Team 2	1st leg	2nd leg
Sevilla	4–1	Espanyol	2–1	2–0
Real Madrid	4–2	Tenerife	4–1	0–1
Barcelona	1–1 (a)	Real Sociedad	0–0	1–1
Racing Santander	3–5	Málaga	1–1	2–4

== Semifinals ==
The four winners play a two-game series best aggregate score beginning the week of June 15 and returning the week of June 22.

Team 1	Agg.	Team 2	1st leg	2nd leg
Málaga	2 – 6	Real Madrid	1–2	1–4
Sevilla	4 – 3	Barcelona	3–1	1–2

== Final ==
The semifinal winners play a one-game final at a neutral site in Cartagena, Murcia on June 29.

=== Details ===
29 June 2014
20:00 CEST (UTC+02:00)

Real Madrid	1 – 1 (a.e.t.)	Sevilla
Febas 62'; Cedrés (yellow card) 102'		Muñoz 34'
Penalties
Legaz (penalty missed); Miki (penalty scored); Cristian Cedrés (penalty scored); Álvaro (penalty missed)	2 – 4	(penalty scored) Sedeño; (penalty scored) Juan Muñoz; (penalty scored) Antonio; (penalty scored) Zelu

La Ciudad del Fútbol Las Rozas (Madrid)
Referee: José María Sánchez Martínez

Real Madrid	Sevilla

REAL MADRID:
GK	1	(Spain) Caba
DF	2	(Spain) Fran
DF	4	(Spain) Jaime
DF	5	(Spain) José León (c)
DF	3	(Spain) Mario
MF	6	(Spain) Marcos Llorente
MF	8	(Spain) Febas	(substituted off) 85'
MF	7	(Spain) Álvaro
MF	10	(Spain) Javi Muñoz	(substituted off) 61'
MF	11	(Spain) Agoney	(substituted off) 61'
FW	9	(Spain) Legaz
Substitutes:
GK	13	(Belgium) Álex
DF	12	(Spain) Felipe
MF	14	(Spain) Miki	(substituted on) 85'
MF	15	(France) Enzo	(substituted on) 61'
MF	16	(Spain) Cristian Cedrés	(substituted on) 61'
Manager: Luis Miguel Ramis

SEVILLA:
GK	1	(Spain) Juan Soriano
DF	2	(Spain) Sedeño
DF	4	(Spain) Luis
DF	5	(Spain) Mesa	(substituted off) 72'
DF	3	(Spain) Matos
MF	6	(Spain) Antonio (c)
MF	8	(Spain) Cera	(substituted off) 108'
FW	7	(Spain) Giráldez	(substituted off) 114'
MF	10	(Spain) Nané
FW	11	(Spain) Carmona	(substituted off) 67'
FW	9	(Spain) Juan Muñoz
Substitutes:
GK	13	(Spain) Mario
MF	12	(Spain) Carrascal	(substituted on) 108'
MF	14	(Puerto Rico) D'Andrea	(substituted on) 72'
FW	15	(Spain) Zelu	(substituted on) 67'
FW	16	(China) Hong	(substituted on) 114'
Manager: Agustín López

== See also ==
- 2013–14 División de Honor Juvenil de Fútbol
