= 2009–10 División de Honor Juvenil de Fútbol =

División de Honor Juvenil de Fútbol
- Season: 2009–10

The 2009–10 División de Honor Juvenil de Fútbol season was the 24th since its establishment.

== Regular season ==
=== Group 1 ===
Pos	Team	Pld	W	D	L	GF	GA	GD	Pts	Qualification or relegation
1	RC Deportivo	30	23	6	1	57	15	+42	75	Copa de Campeones
2	Real Racing Club	30	19	6	5	51	25	+26	63	Copa del Rey
3	Real Sporting	30	18	5	7	61	23	+38	59	
4	Puente Castro FC	30	15	4	11	57	55	+2	49	
5	RC Celta	30	13	8	9	52	38	+14	47	
6	Racing Club de Ferrol	30	12	5	13	45	53	−8	41	
7	TSK Roces	30	11	7	12	38	37	+1	40	
8	Pontevedra CF	30	11	6	13	35	43	−8	39	
9	Montañeros CF	30	10	8	12	45	56	−11	38	
10	Club Bansander	30	10	6	14	38	42	−4	36	
11	Rápido de Bouzas	30	9	7	14	31	42	−11	34	
12	Castro CF	30	8	9	13	24	41	−17	33	
13	Pabellón Ourense CF	30	8	8	14	29	39	−10	32	Relegation
14	Real Oviedo	30	6	13	11	31	38	−7	31	Relegation
15	CD Lugo	30	6	8	16	24	43	−19	26	Relegation
16	Astur CF	30	3	10	17	22	50	−28	19	Relegation

=== Group 2 ===
Pos	Team	Pld	W	D	L	GF	GA	GD	Pts	Qualification or relegation
1	Athletic Club	30	25	3	2	79	23	+56	78	Copa de Campeones
2	Real Sociedad	30	22	2	6	66	27	+39	68	Copa del Rey
3	CA Osasuna	30	17	5	8	62	37	+25	56	
4	SD Eibar	30	15	8	7	58	39	+19	53	
5	Danok Bat	30	16	4	10	50	36	+14	52	
6	UD Logroñés	30	14	7	9	53	38	+15	49	
7	UD Montecarlo	30	14	3	13	49	40	+9	45	
8	Santutxu FC	30	12	8	10	44	44	0	44	
9	Antiguoko KE	30	11	6	13	36	44	−8	39	
10	AD San Juan	30	11	6	13	37	47	−10	39	
11	SD Lagunak	30	10	7	13	41	47	−6	37	
12	Barakaldo CF	30	10	5	15	31	40	−9	35	
13	Indartsu C.	30	6	6	18	29	63	−34	24	Relegation
14	Peña Balsamaiso CF	30	6	4	20	30	71	−41	22	Relegation
15	Arenas Club	30	5	6	19	27	50	−23	21	Relegation
16	CF Comillas	30	4	4	22	23	69	−46	16	Relegation

=== Group 3 ===
Pos	Team	Pld	W	D	L	GF	GA	GD	Pts	Qualification or relegation
1	FC Barcelona	29	23	2	4	78	26	+52	71	Copa de Campeones
2	RCD Espanyol	30	22	4	4	86	28	+58	70	Copa del Rey
3	UD Cornellà	30	20	6	4	50	18	+32	66	Copa del Rey
4	Real Zaragoza	29	14	9	6	62	29	+33	51	
5	RCD Mallorca	30	14	7	9	43	32	+11	49	
6	Girona FC	30	15	2	13	44	43	+1	47	
7	UDA Gramenet Milan	30	13	5	12	41	43	−2	44	
8	CD San Francisco	29	11	7	11	30	30	0	40	
9	CF Damm	30	10	7	13	43	43	0	37	
10	CE L'Hospitalet	30	10	6	14	45	52	−7	36	
11	UD Poblense	30	10	3	17	31	65	−34	33	
12	UE Lleida	30	8	9	13	33	44	−11	33	
13	AD Stadium Casablanca	30	7	7	16	29	45	−16	28	Relegation
14	Terrassa FC	29	7	6	16	34	55	−21	27	Relegation
15	Penya Ciutadella Esp.	30	5	6	19	33	77	−44	21	Relegation
16	CD Ferriolense	30	5	2	23	23	75	−52	17	Relegation

=== Group 4 ===
Pos	Team	Pld	W	D	L	GF	GA	GD	Pts	Qualification or relegation
1	Real Betis Balompié	30	18	8	4	61	30	+31	62	Copa de Campeones
2	UD Almería	30	19	3	8	62	37	+25	60	Copa del Rey
3	Sevilla FC	30	18	6	6	71	29	+42	60	
4	Málaga CF	30	16	9	5	59	33	+26	57	
5	Córdoba CF	30	16	7	7	49	22	+27	55	
6	Real Jaén CF	30	15	3	12	53	44	+9	48	
7	Cádiz CF	30	12	8	10	51	42	+9	44	
8	Xerez CD	30	11	8	11	47	49	−2	41	
9	CD Puerto Malagueño GI	30	9	8	13	54	65	−11	35	
10	CG Goyu-Ryu	30	10	5	15	33	62	−29	35	
11	RC Recreativo Huelva	30	9	6	15	52	68	−16	33	
12	CP Ejido	30	8	8	14	44	62	−18	32	
13	Seneca CF	30	8	8	14	29	46	−17	32	Relegation
14	CDAD Nervión	30	7	4	19	43	63	−20	25	Relegation
15	Ecija Balompié	30	6	7	17	31	56	−25	25	Relegation
16	CDCC Atlético Unión 70	30	6	6	18	35	66	−31	24	Relegation

=== Group 5 ===
Pos	Team	Pld	W	D	L	GF	GA	GD	Pts	Qualification or relegation
1	Real Madrid CF	30	21	6	3	80	25	+55	69	Copa de Campeones
2	Club Atlético de Madrid	30	21	5	4	61	25	+36	68	Copa del Rey
3	Real Valladolid CF	30	21	4	5	63	28	+35	67	Copa del Rey
4	Rayo Vallecano	30	18	9	3	57	26	+31	63	
5	Getafe CF	30	12	8	10	42	34	+8	44	
6	Atlético Madrileño CF	30	13	4	13	48	49	−1	43	
7	CD Leganés	30	12	5	13	54	52	+2	41	
8	UD Salamanca	30	10	8	12	47	55	−8	38	
9	CF Rayo Majadahonda	30	11	5	14	40	40	0	38	
10	AD Unión Adarve	30	11	5	14	26	32	−6	38	
11	Burgos Promesas 2000	30	10	4	16	38	55	−17	34	
12	CP Cacereño	30	8	8	14	41	59	−18	32	
13	UD Talavera	30	9	4	17	41	60	−19	31	Relegation
14	RSD Alcalá	30	6	5	19	40	59	−19	23	Relegation
15	AD Alcobendas	30	5	8	17	24	52	−28	23	Relegation
16	At. San José Promesas	30	6	4	20	25	76	−51	22	Relegation

=== Group 6 ===
Pos	Team	Pld	W	D	L	GF	GA	GD	Pts	Qualification or relegation
1	UD Las Palmas	30	23	5	2	111	33	+78	74	Copa de Campeones
2	CD Tenerife	30	21	4	5	78	31	+47	67	Copa del Rey
3	AD Huracán	30	16	6	8	59	44	+15	54	
4	CD Laguna	30	15	7	8	54	25	+29	52	
5	CD Vallinamar	30	14	2	14	54	69	−15	44	
6	CD Sobradillo	30	11	10	9	62	49	+13	43	
7	CD Puerto Cruz	30	11	8	11	44	62	−18	41	
8	UD Vecindario	30	10	9	11	52	50	+2	39	
9	UD Atalaya	30	9	8	13	37	60	−23	35	
10	Universidad LPGCF	30	9	8	13	50	46	+4	35	
11	Real Unión de Tenerife	30	8	10	12	42	50	−8	34	
12	CD Teguise	30	8	6	16	33	57	−24	30	
13	Puertos de Las Palmas EF	30	8	6	16	30	51	−21	30	Relegation
14	UD Icodense	30	8	5	17	35	69	−34	29	Relegation
15	CD San Diego	30	5	13	12	53	76	−23	28	Relegation
16	CF Unión Viera	30	5	11	14	30	52	−22	26	Relegation

=== Group 7 ===
Pos	Team	Pld	W	D	L	GF	GA	GD	Pts	Qualification or relegation
1	Valencia CF	30	22	4	4	76	24	+52	70	Copa de Campeones
2	Gimnàstic Tarragona	30	18	4	8	54	29	+25	58	Copa del Rey
3	Villarreal CF	30	16	7	7	63	36	+27	55	
4	CD Castellón	30	15	8	7	48	31	+17	53	
5	Hercules CF	30	14	8	8	44	35	+9	50	
6	Real Murcia CF	30	12	9	9	37	32	+5	45	
7	Torre Levante OCF	30	11	9	10	40	46	−6	42	
8	Levante UD	30	12	6	12	39	38	+1	42	
9	Torrellano Illice EPECF	30	10	8	12	42	34	+8	38	
10	Albacete Balompié	30	9	11	10	46	51	−5	38	
11	Elche CF	30	10	7	13	44	57	−13	37	
12	Alicante CF	30	8	11	11	30	39	−9	35	
13	Costa Cálida CF	30	8	7	15	40	57	−17	31	Relegation
14	UB Conquense	30	8	6	16	28	52	−24	30	Relegation
15	At. Cabezo de Torres	30	7	2	21	37	58	−21	23	Relegation
16	UD Cuart de Poblet	30	3	7	20	20	69	−49	16	Relegation

== Copa de Campeones ==
=== Group A ===
==== 1st round ====
Team 1	Score	Team 2
Real Betis	1–0	Barcelona
Deportivo La Coruña	1–2	Valencia

==== 2nd round ====
Team 1	Score	Team 2
Real Betis	1–2	Valencia

=== Group B ===
Team 1	Score	Team 2
Las Palmas	1–2	Athletic Bilbao
Las Palmas	1–3	Real Madrid
Athletic Bilbao	1–2	Real Madrid

=== Final ===
Team 1	Score	Team 2
Real Madrid	3–1	Valencia

Copa de Campeones
winners
Real Madrid

==== Details ====
9 May 2010

Real Madrid	3 – 1	Valencia
Plano 29'; Álex 37'; Sobrino 90'	rfef.es	Isco 22' (pen.)

Real Madrid	Valencia

GK	1	(Spain) Fernando Pacheco
DF	2	(Spain) Dani Carvajal
DF	5	(Spain) Jaime
DF	4	(Spain) Molero
DF	3	(Spain) Capote (c)
MF	7	(Spain) Carlos Expósito	(substituted off) 70'
MF	6	(Spain) Álvaro López
MF	8	(Spain) Álex
MF	11	(Spain) Pablo Sarabia	(substituted off) 87'
FW	10	(Spain) Óscar Plano
FW	9	(Spain) Fran Sol	(substituted off) 75'
Substitutes:
GK	13	(Spain) Aleix
DF	12	(Spain) Nacho Boto
MF	14	(Spain) Kamal	(substituted in) 87'
MF	15	(Spain) Lucas Vázquez	(substituted in) 70'
FW	16	(Spain) Rubén Sobrino	(substituted in) 75'
Manager:

GK	1	(Spain) Carmelo
DF	2	(Spain) Joel Johnson	(substituted off) 38'
DF	3	(Spain) David
DF	5	(Spain) Nacho
DF	15	(Spain) Óscar
MF	20	(Spain) Isco	(substituted off) 83'
MF	16	(Spain) Javi Rey
MF	21	(Spain) Carles
MF	23	(Spain) Iván
FW	24	(Spain) Álvaro	(substituted off) 38'
FW	10	(Spain) Paco Alcácer
Substitutes:
DF	12	(Spain) Miguel Ángel	(substituted in) 38'
GK	13	(Spain) Javi
MF	8	(Spain) Jordi	(substituted in) 38'
MF	16	(Spain) Juan Bernat	(substituted in) 83'
FW	19	(Spain) Kike
Manager:

== See also ==
- 2010 Copa del Rey Juvenil
