= 2006–07 División de Honor Juvenil de Fútbol =

División de Honor Juvenil de Fútbol
- Season: 2006–07

The 2006–07 División de Honor Juvenil de Fútbol season was the 21st since its establishment.

== Group 1 ==
Pos	Team	Pld	W	D	L	GF	GA	GD	Pts	Qualification or relegation
1	Celta	0	-	-	-	-	-	—	0	Copa de Campeones
2	Racing	0	-	-	-	-	-	—	0	
3	Deportivo	0	-	-	-	-	-	—	0	
4	Sporting	0	-	-	-	-	-	—	0	
5	Roces	0	-	-	-	-	-	—	0	
6	Rio Vena	0	-	-	-	-	-	—	0	
7	Montañeros	0	-	-	-	-	-	—	0	
8	At. Perines	0	-	-	-	-	-	—	0	
9	Puente Castro	0	-	-	-	-	-	—	0	
10	C. Leonesa	0	-	-	-	-	-	—	0	
11	R. Oviedo	0	-	-	-	-	-	—	0	
12	Calasanz	0	-	-	-	-	-	—	0	
13	Arosa	0	-	-	-	-	-	—	0	Relegation
14	Astur	0	-	-	-	-	-	—	0	Relegation
15	Porriño	0	-	-	-	-	-	—	0	Relegation
16	San Roque	0	-	-	-	-	-	—	0	Relegation

== Group 2 ==
Pos	Team	Pld	W	D	L	GF	GA	GD	Pts	Qualification or relegation
1	Antiguoko	0	-	-	-	-	-	—	0	Copa de Campeones
2	R.Sociedad	0	-	-	-	-	-	—	0	
3	Danok Bat	0	-	-	-	-	-	—	0	
4	Amistad	0	-	-	-	-	-	—	0	
5	Athletic	0	-	-	-	-	-	—	0	
6	Osasuna	0	-	-	-	-	-	—	0	
7	B. Picarral	0	-	-	-	-	-	—	0	
8	Numancia	0	-	-	-	-	-	—	0	
9	Alavés	0	-	-	-	-	-	—	0	
10	Pamplona	0	-	-	-	-	-	—	0	
11	Varea	0	-	-	-	-	-	—	0	
12	Tolosa	0	-	-	-	-	-	—	0	
13	C. Durango	0	-	-	-	-	-	—	0	Relegation
14	Berceo	0	-	-	-	-	-	—	0	Relegation
15	R. Unión	0	-	-	-	-	-	—	0	Relegation
16	Eibar	0	-	-	-	-	-	—	0	Relegation

== Group 3 ==
Pos	Team	Pld	W	D	L	GF	GA	GD	Pts	Qualification or relegation
1	Espanyol	0	-	-	-	-	-	—	0	Copa de Campeones
2	Barcelona	0	-	-	-	-	-	—	0	
3	Damm	0	-	-	-	-	-	—	0	
4	San Francisco	0	-	-	-	-	-	—	0	
5	Zaragoza	0	-	-	-	-	-	—	0	
6	Mallorca	0	-	-	-	-	-	—	0	
7	Cornellà	0	-	-	-	-	-	—	0	
8	Girona	0	-	-	-	-	-	—	0	
9	Badalona	0	-	-	-	-	-	—	0	
10	Mataró	0	-	-	-	-	-	—	0	
11	Sant Andreu	0	-	-	-	-	-	—	0	
12	La Salle	0	-	-	-	-	-	—	0	
13	L'Hospitalet	0	-	-	-	-	-	—	0	Relegation
14	Manacor	0	-	-	-	-	-	—	0	Relegation
15	Olivar	0	-	-	-	-	-	—	0	Relegation
16	Binéfar	0	-	-	-	-	-	—	0	Relegation

== Group 4 ==
Pos	Team	Pld	W	D	L	GF	GA	GD	Pts	Qualification or relegation
1	Málaga	0	-	-	-	-	-	—	0	Copa de Campeones
2	R. Betis	0	-	-	-	-	-	—	0	
3	Sevilla	0	-	-	-	-	-	—	0	
4	Córdoba	0	-	-	-	-	-	—	0	
5	Cádiz	0	-	-	-	-	-	—	0	
6	Recreativo	0	-	-	-	-	-	—	0	
7	Granada 74	0	-	-	-	-	-	—	0	
8	Goyu-Ryu	0	-	-	-	-	-	—	0	
9	Nervión	0	-	-	-	-	-	—	0	
10	P. Malagueño	0	-	-	-	-	-	—	0	
11	Fuengirola	0	-	-	-	-	-	—	0	
12	Sevilla Este	0	-	-	-	-	-	—	0	
13	Dos Hermanas	0	-	-	-	-	-	—	0	Relegation
14	G. Melilla	0	-	-	-	-	-	—	0	Relegation
15	San Juan	0	-	-	-	-	-	—	0	Relegation
16	P. Ciudad Melilla	0	-	-	-	-	-	—	0	Relegation

== Group 5 ==
Pos	Team	Pld	W	D	L	GF	GA	GD	Pts	Qualification or relegation
1	R. Madrid	0	-	-	-	-	-	—	0	Copa de Campeones
2	At. Madrileño	0	-	-	-	-	-	—	0	
3	Atlético Madrid	0	-	-	-	-	-	—	0	
4	U. Adarve	0	-	-	-	-	-	—	0	
5	Valladolid	0	-	-	-	-	-	—	0	
6	Getafe	0	-	-	-	-	-	—	0	
7	Alcalá	0	-	-	-	-	-	—	0	
8	Badajoz	0	-	-	-	-	-	—	0	
9	Rayo Vallecano	0	-	-	-	-	-	—	0	
10	Majadahonda	0	-	-	-	-	-	—	0	
11	Flecha Negra	0	-	-	-	-	-	—	0	
12	Salamanca	0	-	-	-	-	-	—	0	
13	Villa Rosa	0	-	-	-	-	-	—	0	Relegation
14	Talavera	0	-	-	-	-	-	—	0	Relegation
15	Barrio Pilar	0	-	-	-	-	-	—	0	Relegation
16	Extremadura	0	-	-	-	-	-	—	0	Relegation

== Group 6 ==
Pos	Team	Pld	W	D	L	GF	GA	GD	Pts	Qualification or relegation
1	Las Palmas	0	-	-	-	-	-	—	0	Copa de Campeones
2	Gáldar	0	-	-	-	-	-	—	0	
3	Tenerife	0	-	-	-	-	-	—	0	
4	Vecindario	0	-	-	-	-	-	—	0	
5	Fuerteventura	0	-	-	-	-	-	—	0	
6	U. Viera	0	-	-	-	-	-	—	0	
7	San José	0	-	-	-	-	-	—	0	
8	Universidad LP	0	-	-	-	-	-	—	0	
9	Castillo	0	-	-	-	-	-	—	0	
10	Lanzarote	0	-	-	-	-	-	—	0	
11	Huracán	0	-	-	-	-	-	—	0	
12	San Isidro	0	-	-	-	-	-	—	0	
13	Tenisca	0	-	-	-	-	-	—	0	Relegation
14	Victoria	0	-	-	-	-	-	—	0	Relegation
15	Cruz Santa	0	-	-	-	-	-	—	0	Relegation
16	Andenes	0	-	-	-	-	-	—	0	Relegation

== Group 7 ==
Pos	Team	Pld	W	D	L	GF	GA	GD	Pts	Qualification or relegation
1	Valencia	0	-	-	-	-	-	—	0	Copa de Campeones
2	Albacete	0	-	-	-	-	-	—	0	
3	Villarreal	0	-	-	-	-	-	—	0	
4	Levante	0	-	-	-	-	-	—	0	
5	Murcia	0	-	-	-	-	-	—	0	
6	F. Albacete	0	-	-	-	-	-	—	0	
7	Elche	0	-	-	-	-	-	—	0	
8	Alicante	0	-	-	-	-	-	—	0	
9	Crack's	0	-	-	-	-	-	—	0	
10	Castellón	0	-	-	-	-	-	—	0	
11	Murcia Dep.	0	-	-	-	-	-	—	0	
12	Hércules	0	-	-	-	-	-	—	0	
13	Guadalajara	0	-	-	-	-	-	—	0	Relegation
14	Cartagena	0	-	-	-	-	-	—	0	Relegation
15	Torrent	0	-	-	-	-	-	—	0	Relegation
16	Ranero	0	-	-	-	-	-	—	0	Relegation

== Copa de Campeones ==
=== Group A ===
Team 1	Score	Team 2
Valencia	3 – 0	Antiguoko
Antiguoko	1 – 5	RCD Espanyol
Valencia	2 – 0	RCD Espanyol

=== Group B ===
==== 1st round ====
Team 1	Score	Team 2
UD Las Palmas	2 (p) – 2	Málaga CF
Celta de Vigo	3 – 4 (a.e.t.)	Real Madrid

==== 2nd round ====
Team 1	Score	Team 2
UD Las Palmas	1 – 2	Real Madrid

=== Final ===
Team 1	Score	Team 2
Real Madrid	1 – 3	Valencia

Copa de Campeones
winners
Valencia CF

==== Details ====
29 April 2007
11:30

Real Madrid	1 – 3	Valencia
Luis Hernández 47'	rfef	Pierrick 34'; Olcina 59'; Pierrick 93'

Municipal El Maulí, Antequera

Real Madrid	Valencia

R.Madrid:
GK	(Spain) Gonzalo
DF	(Spain) Aridane
DF	(Spain) Antón
DF	(Spain) Verdú
DF	(Spain) Prats
MF	(Spain) Parejo
MF	(Spain) Cruz	(substituted off) 46'
MF	(Spain) Luis Hernández (c)	(substituted off) 77'
FW	(Spain) Pedro	(substituted off) 70'
FW	(Ecuador) Guerrero
FW	(Spain) Javi Hernández
Substitutes:
MF	(Spain) Omar	(substituted in) 46'
MF	(Poland) Szymon	(substituted in) 77'
FW	(Spain) Javi Rodríguez	(substituted in) 70'
Manager:

Valencia:
GK	(Spain) Salva
DF	(Spain) Alexis
DF	(Spain) Lillo
DF	(Spain) Arturo
DF	(Spain) Jaume	(substituted off) 88'
MF	(Spain) Carles
MF	(Spain) Otero	(substituted off) 57'
MF	(Spain) Montoro
MF	(Spain) Moraga	(substituted off) 36'
FW	(Spain) Olcina
FW	(Cameroon) Pierrick	(substituted off) 94'
Substitutes:
MF	(Spain) Timor	(substituted in) 88'
MF	(Spain) Ximo Navarro	(substituted in) 57'
DF	(Spain) Yago	(substituted in) 36'
GK	(Spain) Gonzalo	(substituted in) 94'
Manager:

== See also ==
- 2007 Copa del Rey Juvenil
