= 2000 Copa del Rey Juvenil =

Tournament details
- Country: Spain
- Teams: 16

Final positions
- Champions: FC Barcelona
- Runners-up: Mallorca

Tournament statistics
- Matches played: 29
- Goals scored: 81 (2.79 per match)

The 2000 Copa del Rey Juvenil was the 50th staging of the tournament. The competition began on 14 May 2000 and ended with the final on 25 June 2000.

== Qualified teams ==
- Group I: Valladolid, Sporting de Gijón, Racing de Santander.
- Group II: Zaragoza, Athletic Bilbao, Real Sociedad.
- Group III: FC Barcelona, Mallorca, Espanyol.
- Group IV: Sevilla, Málaga, Cádiz.
- Group V: Real Madrid, Atlético Madrid, Rayo Vallecano.
- Group VI: Huracán.

== First round ==
Team 1	Agg.	Team 2	1st leg	2nd leg
Racing de Santander	3–1	Real Sociedad	1–1	2–0
Valladolid	1–3	Zaragoza	1–2	0–1
Athletic Bilbao	5–3	Sporting de Gijón	2–2	3–1
Espanyol	0–2	Málaga	0–2	0–0
Sevilla	2–4	FC Barcelona	2–2	0–2
Huracán	5–6	Real Madrid	1–1	4–5
Rayo Vallecano	1–3	Mallorca	1–0	0–3
Atlético Madrid	7–2	Cádiz	3–0	4–2

== Quarterfinals ==
Team 1	Agg.	Team 2	1st leg	2nd leg
Atlético Madrid	3–0	Racing de Santander	2–0	1–0
Athletic Bilbao	4–1	Real Madrid	2–0	2–1
Mallorca	7–1	Málaga	5–0	2–1
Zaragoza	3–3 (a)	FC Barcelona	1–3	2–0

== Semifinals ==
Team 1	Agg.	Team 2	1st leg	2nd leg
Atlético Madrid	1–2	FC Barcelona	0–0	1–2
Mallorca	3–2	Athletic Bilbao	3–0	0–2

== Final ==
25 June 2000
11:30

FC Barcelona	2–1	Mallorca
Trashorras 11', 18'	Report	José Rodríguez 78'

Municipal, Valdepeñas
Attendance: 2,500
Referee: Ontanava López

FC Barcelona:
GK	(Spain) Víctor Valdés (yellow card)
DF	(Spain) Peque
DF	(Spain) José Manuel Rial
DF	(Spain) Fernando Navarro
MF	(Spain) Mikel Arteta
MF	(Spain) Juanito (yellow card) (substituted off) 66'
MF	(Spain) Jordi López
MF	(Spain) Roberto Trashorras (yellow card)
FW	(Spain) Mendoza (substituted off) 46'
FW	(Spain) Jorge Perona (substituted off) 87'
FW	(Spain) Felipe Sanchón (substituted off) 46'
Substitutes:
MF	(Spain) Nano (substituted on) 46'
MF	(Spain) César (substituted on) 46'
DF	(Spain) Colo (substituted on) 66'
FW	(Spain) Víctor Curto (substituted on) 87'
Manager:
(Spain) Juan Carlos Rojo

Mallorca:
GK	(Spain) Rafa Leva
DF	(Spain) Francisco Amate
DF	(Spain) Julio Huertas (yellow card)
DF	(Spain) Xisco Campos (yellow card)
MF	(Spain) Dani Camacho
DF	(Argentina) Juan Manuel Viale
MF	(Spain) Arnau Riera (yellow card) (substituted off) 71'
MF	(Spain) José Rodríguez (yellow card)
FW	(Spain) Sergio Floro (substituted off) 50'
MF	(Peru) Roberto Merino
FW	(Spain) Albert Riera (substituted off) 87'
Substitutes:
FW	(Spain) Jordi Vinuesa (substituted on) 50'
MF	(Spain) Toni González (substituted on) 71'
MF	(Spain) Nando Ramón (substituted on) 87'
Manager:
(Spain) Tomeu Llompart

Copa del Generalísimo
Winners
FC Barcelona

== See also ==
- 2002 Copa del Rey Juvenil (final played between same clubs)
