= 2002 Copa del Rey Juvenil =

Tournament details
- Country: Spain
- Teams: 16

Final positions
- Champions: FC Barcelona
- Runners-up: Mallorca

Tournament statistics
- Matches played: 29
- Goals scored: 58 (2 per match)

The 2002 Copa del Rey Juvenil was the 52nd staging of the tournament. The competition began on May 22, 2002 and ended on June 29, 2002 with the final.

== First round ==
Team 1	Agg.	Team 2	1st leg	2nd leg
Espanyol	0–3	Sevilla	0–0	0–3
Betis	0–3	FC Barcelona	0–0	0–3
Celta de Vigo	3–0	Athletic Bilbao	3–0	0–0
Cádiz	2–3	Real Madrid	2–1	0–2
Real Sociedad	3–3 (p)	Atlético Perines	3–0	0–3
Atlético Madrid	2–0	Las Palmas	1–0	1–0
Mallorca	3–2	Rayo Vallecano	2–0	1–2
Sporting de Gijón	1–2	Zaragoza	1–1	0–1

== Quarterfinals ==
Team 1	Agg.	Team 2	1st leg	2nd leg
Real Sociedad	1–2	Sevilla	1–1	0–1
FC Barcelona	2–0	Zaragoza	1–0	1–0
Real Madrid	2–4	Celta de Vigo	1–2	1–2
Atlético Madrid	1–2	Mallorca	0–0	1–2

== Semifinals ==
Team 1	Agg.	Team 2	1st leg	2nd leg
Celta de Vigo	1–3	Mallorca	1–0	0–3
Sevilla	2–5	FC Barcelona	1–1	1–4

== Final ==
29 June 2002
20:30

FC Barcelona	2–1	Mallorca
Carroza 57'; Sergio García 82'	Report	Vizuete 21'

La Fuensanta, Cuenca
Attendance: 5,000
Referee: Rubio Iniesta

FC Barcelona:
GK	(Spain) Rubén Martínez
DF	(Spain) Dani Fernández (yellow card)
DF	(Spain) Rodri
MF	(Spain) Andreu Guerao
DF	(Spain) Fran González
MF	(Spain) Joan Verdú (substituted off) 90'
MF	(Spain) Javito (substituted off) 63'
MF	(Spain) Alberto Carroza (substituted off) 76'
FW	(Spain) Sergio García
FW	(Spain) Jesús Tato (yellow card)
FW	(Spain) Manuel Lanzarote (substituted off) 85'
Substitutes:
FW	(Spain) Javier Seco (substituted on) 63'
DF	(Spain) Jordi Mesalles (substituted on) 76'
MF	(Spain) Víctor Bravo (substituted on) 85'
MF	(Spain) Pitu Comadevall (substituted on) 90'
Manager:
(Spain) Jordi Roura

Mallorca:
GK	(Spain) Miguel Ángel Moyà
DF	(Peru) Iván Merino
DF	(Spain) Javi Moreno
DF	(Spain) Iván Ramis
DF	(Spain) Dani Camacho
MF	(Spain) Albert Cano
MF	(Spain) Cheché (substituted off) 56'
MF	(Spain) César Collado
MF	(Spain) Áxel Vizuete (substituted off) 59'
FW	(Spain) Juan Luis Toledo (substituted off) 67'
FW	(Spain) Guillem Bauzà (substituted off) 85'
Substitutes:
MF	(Spain) Vicens (substituted on) 56'
FW	(Spain) Biri (substituted on) 59'
MF	(Spain) Xisco Cladera (substituted on) 67'
FW	(Spain) Chus Seco (substituted on) 85'
Manager:

Copa del Generalísimo
Winners
FC Barcelona

== See also ==
- 2000 Copa del Rey Juvenil (final played between same clubs)
