= 2006 Copa del Rey Juvenil =

Tournament details
- Country: Spain
- Teams: 16

Final positions
- Champions: FC Barcelona
- Runners-up: Zaragoza

Tournament statistics
- Matches played: 29
- Goals scored: 80 (2.76 per match)

The 2006 Copa del Rey Juvenil was the 56th staging of the tournament. The competition began on May 14, 2006 and ended on June 24, 2006 with the final.

FC Barcelona defeated Zaragoza in the final.

== First round ==
Team 1	Agg.	Team 2	1st leg	2nd leg
Zaragoza	3–3 (a)	Racing de Santander	1–0	2–3
Athletic Bilbao	3–3 (a)	Deportivo	1–0	2–3
Valladolid	1–1 (a)	Real Sociedad	1–1	0–0
Rayo Majadahonda	2–2 (p)	Mallorca	2–0	0–2
San José	1–7	Real Madrid	1–4	0–3
Albacete	2–1	Fuengirola	1–0	1–1
Betis	1–3	FC Barcelona	1–1	0–2
Espanyol	9–3	Nervión	7–0	2–3

== Quarterfinals ==
Team 1	Agg.	Team 2	1st leg	2nd leg
Athletic Bilbao	3–5	FC Barcelona	1–1	2–4
Real Sociedad	1–2	Albacete	1–1	0–1
Mallorca	2–4	Real Madrid	2–1	0–3
Zaragoza	2–2 (p)	Espanyol	1–1	1–1

== Semifinals ==
Team 1	Agg.	Team 2	1st leg	2nd leg
Real Madrid	4–4 (a)	FC Barcelona	4–1	0–3
Albacete	2–2 (a)	Zaragoza	2–1	0–1

== Final ==
24 June 2006
19:30

FC Barcelona	2–0	Zaragoza
Busquets 37'; Jaime 73'	Report

Los Pajaritos, Soria
Attendance: 1,800
Referee: Turienzo Álvarez

FC Barcelona:
GK	(Spain) Pau Torres
DF	(Spain) Robert Franch
DF	(Spain) José Hinojosa
DF	(Spain) Xavier Marqués
DF	(Spain) Jaime Hernández
MF	(Spain) Sergio Busquets
MF	(Spain) Marc Crosas (substituted off) 90'
MF	(Spain) Daniel Toribio (substituted off) 85'
FW	(Mexico) Giovani dos Santos (substituted off) 80'
FW	(Spain) Bojan Krkić (substituted off) 77'
FW	(Spain) Jeffrén Suárez
Substitutes:
MF	(Spain) Víctor Sánchez (substituted on) 77'
FW	(Spain) Iago Falque (substituted on) 80'
MF	(Spain) Pitu Plazuelo (substituted on) 85'
MF	(Spain) David Lopez (substituted on) 90'
Manager:
(Spain) Álex García (red card) 54'

Zaragoza:
GK	(Spain) Unai Calavia
DF	(Spain) Sergio Bruna (yellow card) 55'
DF	(Spain) Raúl Goni (yellow card) 66' (substituted off) 77'
DF	(Spain) Jorge Gotor
DF	(Spain) Sicilia (yellow card) 65'
MF	(Spain) Luis Jarque (substituted off) 59'
MF	(Spain) Breznes (yellow card) 56' (substituted off) 83'
MF	(Spain) Jorge Miramón (substituted off) 70'
FW	(Spain) Esaú García
MF	(Spain) Jorge Romero
FW	(Spain) Miki García
Substitutes:
FW	(Spain) Álex Sánchez (substituted on) 59'
MF	(Spain) Blasco (yellow card) 90+3' (substituted on) 70'
MF	(Spain) Chavi (substituted on) 77'
MF	(Spain) Lozano (substituted on) 83'
Manager:
(Spain) Carlos Rojo

Copa del Generalísimo
Winners
FC Barcelona
