= 2026 Tercera Federación play-offs =

The 2026 Tercera Federación play-offs to Segunda Federación from Tercera Federación (promotion play-offs) are the final play-offs for the promotion from 2025–26 Tercera Federación to 2026–27 Segunda Federación.

== Format ==
Group champions will be promoted directly to the Segunda Federación. Due to the remodeling of the RFEF leagues, as of 2021–22 season the promotion play-off is divided into two stages: regional and national. Four teams from each group participate in the regional stage, which were classified between places second and fifth of the regular season. Since 2022–23 season the regional stage is a series of two matches. The second classified will face the fifth classified; and the third will do the same with the fourth. The winners of the two series will play a series to determine the team that will qualify for the national stage.

In the regional phase, if the aggregated score ends in a draw, extra time will be played, if the same result is maintained at the end of extra time, the best seeded team will win.

The national stage will be played by 18 teams, which won their respective regional play-offs. Since 2022–23 season nine different series will be played to determine the winners of the promotion to Segunda Federación.

As 2022–23 season, the RFEF recovered the two-legged knockout system, due to the complaints filed against the single knockout system at a neutral venue that had been implemented after COVID-19 and the subsequent reform of the football leagues organized by the RFEF.

== Qualified teams ==
Group 1		Group 2		Group 3		Group 4		Group 5		Group 6	
2nd	**Compostela**	2nd	Covadonga	2nd	Laredo	2nd	Leioa	2nd	Badalona	2nd	Atlético Saguntino
3rd	Atlético Arteixo	3rd	Sporting Atlético	3rd	Tropezón	3rd	Derio	3rd	Cornellà	3rd	Atlético Levante
4th	Estradense	4th	Caudal	4th	Guarnizo	4th	Lagun Onak	4th	Vilanova	4th	Villarreal C
5th	Racing Villalbés	5th	Mosconia	5th	Escobedo	5th	Touring	5th	L'Hospitalet	5th	**La Nucía**
Group 7		Group 8		Group 9		Group 10		Group 11		Group 12	
2nd	Trival Valderas	2nd	Guijuelo	2nd	Motril	2nd	Dos Hermanas	2nd	Manacor	2nd	San Fernando
3rd	Torrejón	3rd	Cristo Atlético	3rd	Torre del Mar	3rd	**Atlético Central**	3rd	**Peña Deportiva**	3rd	Mensajero
4th	Las Rozas	4th	Palencia	4th	Arenas	4th	Bollullos	4th	Constància	4th	**Tamaraceite**
5th	Leganés B	5th	Santa Marta	5th	Churriana	5th	Ceuta B	5th	Llosetense	5th	Panadería Pulido
Group 13		Group 14		Group 15		Group 16		Group 17		Group 18	
2nd	**Murcia Imperial**	2nd	**Badajoz**	2nd	Pamplona	2nd	Varea	2nd	Cuarte	2nd	Tarancón
3rd	Unión Molinense	3rd	Moralo	3rd	Izarra	3rd	**Arnedo**	3rd	Atlético Monzón	3rd	Toledo
4th	Olímpico de Totana	4th	Azuaga	4th	Subiza	4th	Calahorra	4th	Épila	4th	**Atlético Albacete**
5th	Mazarrón	5th	Jaraíz	5th	San Juan	5th	Oyonesa	5th	Caspe	5th	Manchego

- Teams in **bold** promoted to the Segunda Federación
- Teams in italics progressed to the national stage

== Regional stage ==
=== Group 1 – Galicia ===
Semi–finals
2	Compostela	0	6	6
5	Racing Villalbés	0	1	1
3	Atlético Arteixo (a.e.t.)	1	2	3
4	Estradense	0	2	2

Final
2	Compostela (a.e.t.)	1	2	3 (seed)
3	Atlético Arteixo	2	1	3

=== Group 2 – Asturias ===
Semi–finals
2	Covadonga	0	2	2
5	Mosconia	0	1	1
3	Sporting Atlético	0	1	1
4	Caudal (a.e.t.)	0	2	2

Final
2	Covadonga	1	2	3
4	Caudal	2	4	6

=== Group 3 – Cantabria ===
Semi–finals
2	Laredo (a.e.t.)	0	3	3
5	Escobedo	0	1	1
3	Tropezón	0	3	3
4	Guarnizo	0	0	0

Final
2	Laredo	0	0	0
3	Tropezón (a.e.t.)	0	1	1

=== Group 4 – Basque Country ===
Semi–finals
2	Leioa (a.e.t.)	1	2	3 (seed)
5	Touring	0	3	3
3	Derio	0	2	2 (seed)
4	Lagun Onak	2	0	2

Final
2	Leioa	1	1	2
3	Derio	0	0	0

=== Group 5 – Catalonia ===
Semi–finals
2	Badalona	2	1	3 (seed)
5	L'Hospitalet	0	3	3
3	Cornellà (a.e.t.)	1	1	2 (seed)
4	Vilanova	0	2	2

Final
2	Badalona (a.e.t.)	1	3	4 (seed)
3	Cornellà	4	0	4

=== Group 6 – Valencian Community ===
Semi–finals
2	Atlético Saguntino	1	1	2
5	La Nucía	3	0	3
3	Atlético Levante	3	1	4
4	Villarreal C	1	2	3

Final
5	La Nucía	1	1	2
3	Atlético Levante	0	1	1

=== Group 7 – Community of Madrid ===
Semi–finals
2	Trival Valderas (a.e.t.)	1	1	2
5	Leganés B	0	1	1
3	Torrejón	0	0	0
4	Las Rozas	1	3	4

Final
2	Trival Valderas	1	3	4
4	Las Rozas	1	1	2

=== Group 8 – Castile and León ===
Semi–finals
2	Guijuelo	1	2	3
5	Santa Marta	1	0	1
3	Cristo Atlético	0	1	1
4	Palencia	2	0	2

Final
2	Guijuelo (a.e.t.)	3	1	4 (seed)
4	Palencia	2	2	4

=== Group 9 – Eastern Andalusia ===
Semi–finals
2	Motril	1	0	1 (seed)
5	Churriana	1	0	1
3	Torre del Mar	0	0	0
4	Arenas	1	1	2

Final
2	Motril	0	1	1
4	Arenas	1	1	2

=== Group 10 – Western Andalusia ===
Semi–finals
2	Dos Hermanas (a.e.t.)	2	4	6
5	Ceuta B	2	2	4
3	Atlético Central	0	2	2
4	Bollullos	1	0	1

Final
2	Dos Hermanas	2	1	3
3	Atlético Central	1	4	5

=== Group 11 – Balearic Islands ===
Semi–finals
2	Manacor	1	2	3
5	Llosetense	1	1	2
3	Peña Deportiva	1	2	3
4	Constància	1	1	2

Final
2	Manacor	1	1	2
3	Peña Deportiva	2	3	5

=== Group 12 – Canary Islands ===
Semi–finals
2	San Fernando	2	1	3
5	Panadería Pulido	0	2	2
3	Mensajero	0	1	1
4	Tamaraceite	2	0	2

Final
2	San Fernando	0	1	1
4	Tamaraceite	3	1	4

=== Group 13 – Region of Murcia ===
Semi–finals
2	Murcia Imperial	1	2	3
5	Mazarrón	1	0	1
3	Unión Molinense	0	0	0
4	Olímpico Totana	0	2	2

Final
2	Murcia Imperial	1	2	3
4	Olímpico Totana	1	1	2

=== Group 14 – Extremadura ===
Semi–finals
2	Badajoz	0	2	2
5	Jaraíz	1	0	1
3	Moralo	1	0	1
4	Azuaga	0	0	0

Final
2	Badajoz	2	0	2
3	Moralo	0	0	0

=== Group 15 – Navarre ===
Semi–finals
2	Pamplona	1	1	2
5	San Juan	0	1	1
3	Izarra	0	4	4
4	Subiza	1	0	1

Final
2	Pamplona	1	5	6
3	Izarra	1	1	2

=== Group 16 – La Rioja ===
Semi–finals
2	Varea	0	0	0
5	Oyonesa	0	2	2
3	Arnedo	2	1	3
4	Calahorra	0	0	0

Final
5	Oyonesa	0	2	2
3	Arnedo	0	3	3

=== Group 17 – Aragon ===
Semi–finals
2	Cuarte	1	2	3
5	Caspe	1	1	2
3	Atlético Monzón	1	1	2
4	Épila	0	0	0

Final
2	Cuarte	2	0	2
3	Atlético Monzón	0	1	1

=== Group 18 – Castilla–La Mancha ===
Semi–finals
2	Tarancón	0	0	0
5	Manchego	0	1	1
3	Toledo	0	0	0
4	Atlético Albacete	0	1	1

Final
5	Manchego	2	0	2
4	Atlético Albacete	0	3	3

== National stage ==
=== Qualified teams ===
Group	Position	Team
1	2nd	**Compostela**
4	2nd	Leioa
5	2nd	Badalona
7	2nd	Trival Valderas
8	2nd	Guijuelo
13	2nd	**Murcia Imperial**
14	2nd	**Badajoz**
15	2nd	Pamplona
17	2nd	Cuarte

Group	Position	Team
3	3rd	Tropezón
10	3rd	**Atlético Central**
11	3rd	**Peña Deportiva**
16	3rd	**Arnedo**

Group	Position	Team
2	4th	Caudal
9	4th	Arenas
12	4th	**Tamaraceite**
18	4th	**Atlético Albacete**

Group	Position	Team
6	5th	**La Nucía**

Bold indicates teams that were promoted

=== Matches ===
Team 1	Agg.	Team 2	1st leg	2nd leg
Tropezón	1–1 (2–4)	(p) **Arnedo**	1–0	0–1
**Murcia Imperial**	3–2	Pamplona	2–1	1–1
Guijuelo	2–3	**Tamaraceite**	2–1	0–2
Trival Valderas	0–1	**La Nucía**	0–0	0–1
**Compostela**	3–2	Badalona	3–0	0–2
Arenas	3–6	**Peña Deportiva**	1–1	2–5
**Atlético Central**	3–1	Caudal	2–0	1–1
**Badajoz**	3–2	Cuarte	2–1	1–1
Leioa	1–2	**Atlético Albacete**	1–0	0–2

First leg

13 June 2026	**Leioa**	**1–0**	**Atlético Albacete**	Leioa
19:00 UTC+2	Blanco 25'	Report		Stadium: Zona Deportiva Sarriena; Referee: Benito González Barruetabeña

13 June 2026	**Tropezón**	**1–0**	**Arnedo**	Tanos
19:00 UTC+2	Gago 3'	Report		Stadium: Campo Municipal Santa Ana; Referee: Fernando Prado Núñez

14 June 2026	**Murcia Imperial**	**2–1**	**Pamplona**	Murcia
11:00 UTC+2	Meca 4', 90'	Report	Saralegui 39'	Stadium: Estadio Enrique Roca; Referee: Enrique Vicente López Herraiz

14 June 2026	**Trival Valderas**	**0–0**	**La Nucía**	Alcorcón
11:30 UTC+2		Report		Stadium: Polideportivo La Canaleja; Referee: Víctor Manuel Gallego Rodríguez

14 June 2026	**Arenas**	**1–1**	**Peña Deportiva**	Armilla
12:00 UTC+2	Cabello 23'	Report	Montori 36' (pen.)	Stadium: Estadio Municipal; Referee: Jorge Arias Silva

14 June 2026	**Guijuelo**	**2–1**	**Tamaraceite**	Guijuelo
12:00 UTC+2	Elorza 7'; Martín 76'	Report	Salgado 89'	Stadium: Estadio Municipal Luis Ramos; Referee: Jon Elorza Rodríguez

14 June 2026	**Compostela**	**3–0**	**Badalona**	Santiago de Compostela
18:00 UTC+2	Valín 5'; Guisande 47'; Vilasánchez 76'	Report		Stadium: Estadio Verónica Boquete de San Lázaro; Referee: Guillermo Íñigo Hernández

14 June 2026	**Atlético Central**	**2–0**	**Caudal**	Alcalá de Guadaíra
19:00 UTC+2	Sachetti 43'; Virtudes 90'	Report		Stadium: Nuevo Estadio Ciudad de Alcalá; Referee: Nauzet Jesús Rizo Negrín

14 June 2026	**Badajoz**	**2–1**	**Cuarte**	Badajoz
19:30 UTC+2	Quezada 14'; Bravo 90'	Report	Villaoslada 9'	Stadium: Estadio Nuevo Vivero; Referee: Rafael Jiménez Villalba

Second leg

20 June 2026	Pamplona	**1–1** (**2–3** agg.)	**Murcia Imperial**	Lizasoain
18:00 UTC+2	Amadoz 35' (pen.)	Report	Giménez 6'	Stadium: Campo de Fútbol Beitikuntze; Referee: Andrés Martínez Martínez

20 June 2026	**La Nucía**	**1–0** (**1–0** agg.)	Trival Valderas	La Nucia
19:00 UTC+2	Mazzocchi 66'	Report		Stadium: Estadi Olímpic Camilo Cano; Referee: José María Soriano Méndez

20 June 2026	**Arnedo**	**1–0** (**1–1** agg.) (**4–2** p)	Tropezón	Arnedo
19:00 UTC+2	Vidorreta 58'	Report		Stadium: Campo Municipal de Fútbol Sendero; Referee: Rubén Álvarez Pérez

20 June 2026	**Peña Deportiva**	**5–2** (**6–3** agg.)	Arenas	Santa Eulària des Riu
20:00 UTC+2	Salinas 28'; Etxaniz 53'; Montori 54', 56'; Fraile 75'	Report	Bolívar 34'; Pérez 71'	Stadium: Campo Municipal de Deportes; Referee: Jesús Izquierdo García

20 June 2026	Cuarte	**1–1** (**1–3** agg.)	**Badajoz**	Cuarte de Huerva
20:00 UTC+2	Vera 7'	Report	Bermu 59'	Stadium: Estadio Municipal Juan Guerrero

20 June 2026	Caudal	**1–1** (**1–3** agg.)	**Atlético Central**	Mieres
20:00 UTC+2	Carcaba 45'	Report	Castillo 88'	Stadium: Estadio Hermanos Antuña; Referee: Miguel Ángel Castro Castro

21 June 2026	Badalona	**2–0** (**2–3** agg.)	**Compostela**	Badalona
12:30 UTC+2	Bermúdez 70'; Maceira 90' (own)	Report		Stadium: Estadi Municipal; Referee: Juan José Pacheco Guijarro

21 June 2026	**Tamaraceite**	**2–0** (**3–2** agg.)	Guijuelo	Las Palmas
13:00 UTC+2	García 19'; Reyes 60'	Report		Stadium: Campo de Fútbol Juan Guedes; Referee: Enric Bureu Méndez

21 June 2026	**Atlético Albacete**	**2–0** (**2–1** agg.)	**Leioa**	Albacete
20:30 UTC+2	Fran 48'; Capi 82'	Report		Stadium: Estadio Carlos Belmonte; Referee: Miguel Gómez Blázquez

== Promoted teams ==
- The 18 teams that were promoted through regular season groups are included.
- The number of years after the last participation of the club in the fourth tier is referred to the previous appearance at that level. Depending on the time, it could have been Divisiones Regionales (until 1977), Tercera División (1977–2021) or Segunda Federación (2021–present).

Promoted to Segunda Federación
Arnedo (3 years later)	Arosa (4 years later)	Atlético Albacete (5 years later)	Atlético Central (First time ever)	Atlético Madrid C (11 years later)	Atlético Paso (1 year later)	Atlético Tordesillas (5 years later)	Badajoz (2 years later)	Calamocha (5 years later)
Calvo Sotelo (4 years later)	Castellonense (52 years later)	Cieza (7 years later)	Ciudad de Lucena (5 years later)	Compostela (1 year later)	Don Benito (1 year later)	Gimnástica de Torrelavega (1 year later)	La Nucía (2 years later)	Llanera (1 year later)
UD Logroñés B (3 years later)	Mallorca B (1 year later)	Manresa (2 years later)	Mijas-Las Lagunas (First time ever)	Murcia Imperial (5 years later)	Peña Deportiva (1 year later)	Peña Sport (4 years later)	Portugalete (6 years later)	Tamaraceite (4 years later)
