= 2016–17 División de Honor Juvenil de Fútbol =

División de Honor Juvenil de Fútbol
- Season: 2016–17

The 2016–17 División de Honor Juvenil de Fútbol season is the 31st since its establishment. The regular season began on 4 September 2016 and ends on 9 April 2017.

== Competition format ==
- The champion of each group and the best runner-up will play in the 2017 Copa de Campeones and the Copa del Rey.
- The other six runners-up and the two best third-placed teams qualify for the Copa del Rey.
- In each group, at least four teams (thirteenth placed on down) will be relegated to Liga Nacional.
- The champion of the Copa de Campeones will get a place for the 2017–18 UEFA Youth League.

== League tables ==
=== Group I ===
| Pos | Team | Pld | W | D | L | GF | GA | GD | Pts | Qualification or relegation |
|---|---|---|---|---|---|---|---|---|---|---|
| 1 | Celta Vigo | 30 | 23 | 5 | 2 | 89 | 22 | +67 | 74 | Qualification to Copa de Campeones |
| 2 | Sporting Gijón | 30 | 22 | 3 | 5 | 100 | 27 | +73 | 69 | Qualification to Copa del Rey |
| 3 | Deportivo La Coruña | 30 | 20 | 7 | 3 | 86 | 35 | +51 | 67 | Qualification to Copa del Rey |
| 4 | Lugo | 30 | 19 | 4 | 7 | 62 | 39 | +23 | 61 | |
| 5 | Oviedo | 30 | 15 | 10 | 5 | 66 | 42 | +24 | 55 | |
| 6 | Racing Santander | 30 | 14 | 6 | 10 | 48 | 45 | +3 | 48 | |
| 7 | Val Miñor | 30 | 11 | 4 | 15 | 51 | 53 | −2 | 37 | |
| 8 | Bansander | 30 | 10 | 7 | 13 | 46 | 57 | −11 | 37 | |
| 9 | Roces | 30 | 10 | 6 | 14 | 41 | 51 | −10 | 36 | |
| 10 | Areosa | 30 | 9 | 6 | 15 | 40 | 50 | −10 | 33 | |
| 11 | Santiago de Compostela | 30 | 8 | 9 | 13 | 55 | 59 | −4 | 33 | |
| 12 | Alondras | 30 | 8 | 8 | 14 | 38 | 59 | −21 | 32 | |
| 13 | Avilés | 30 | 9 | 4 | 17 | 40 | 53 | −13 | 31 | Relegation to Liga Nacional |
| 14 | Marina Sport | 30 | 7 | 7 | 16 | 33 | 86 | −53 | 28 | Relegation to Liga Nacional |
| 15 | Tropezón | 30 | 7 | 3 | 20 | 32 | 71 | −39 | 24 | Relegation to Liga Nacional |
| 16 | Pabellón Ourense | 30 | 2 | 3 | 25 | 19 | 97 | −78 | 9 | Relegation to Liga Nacional |

Rules for classification: 1) Points; 2) Goal difference; 3) Number of goals scored

=== Group II ===
| Pos | Team | Pld | W | D | L | GF | GA | GD | Pts | Qualification or relegation |
|---|---|---|---|---|---|---|---|---|---|---|
| 1 | Osasuna | 30 | 21 | 5 | 4 | 70 | 35 | +35 | 68 | Qualification to Copa de Campeones |
| 2 | Alavés | 30 | 18 | 8 | 4 | 64 | 34 | +30 | 62 | Qualification to Copa del Rey |
| 3 | Athletic Bilbao | 30 | 18 | 5 | 7 | 69 | 41 | +28 | 59 | |
| 4 | Real Sociedad | 30 | 16 | 5 | 9 | 74 | 38 | +36 | 53 | |
| 5 | San Juan | 30 | 14 | 7 | 9 | 41 | 30 | +11 | 49 | |
| 6 | Eibar | 30 | 13 | 9 | 8 | 41 | 36 | +5 | 48 | |
| 7 | Danok Bat | 30 | 13 | 3 | 14 | 58 | 46 | +12 | 42 | |
| 8 | Txantrea | 30 | 13 | 3 | 14 | 45 | 45 | 0 | 42 | |
| 9 | Varea | 30 | 12 | 5 | 13 | 51 | 61 | −10 | 41 | |
| 10 | Getxo | 30 | 10 | 10 | 10 | 39 | 50 | −11 | 40 | |
| 11 | Numancia | 30 | 11 | 5 | 14 | 50 | 57 | −7 | 38 | |
| 12 | Antiguoko | 30 | 8 | 11 | 11 | 40 | 41 | −1 | 35 | |
| 13 | Santutxu | 30 | 7 | 7 | 16 | 31 | 48 | −17 | 28 | Relegation to Liga Nacional |
| 14 | Aurrerá Vitoria | 30 | 6 | 7 | 17 | 29 | 59 | −30 | 25 | Relegation to Liga Nacional |
| 15 | Ardoi | 30 | 6 | 4 | 20 | 41 | 75 | −34 | 22 | Relegation to Liga Nacional |
| 16 | Oberena | 30 | 4 | 6 | 20 | 27 | 74 | −47 | 18 | Relegation to Liga Nacional |

Updated to match(es) played on 9 April 2016. Source:
Rules for classification: 1) Points; 2) Goal difference; 3) Number of goals scored

=== Group III ===
| Pos | Team | Pld | W | D | L | GF | GA | GD | Pts | Qualification or relegation |
|---|---|---|---|---|---|---|---|---|---|---|
| 1 | Barcelona | 30 | 22 | 5 | 3 | 72 | 22 | +50 | 71 | Qualification to Copa de Campeones |
| 2 | Mallorca | 30 | 19 | 7 | 4 | 59 | 17 | +42 | 64 | Qualification to Copa del Rey |
| 3 | Espanyol | 30 | 17 | 9 | 4 | 54 | 24 | +30 | 60 | |
| 4 | Cornellà | 30 | 16 | 5 | 9 | 40 | 29 | +11 | 53 | |
| 5 | Damm | 30 | 16 | 5 | 9 | 45 | 30 | +15 | 53 | |
| 6 | Zaragoza | 30 | 12 | 10 | 8 | 40 | 37 | +3 | 46 | |
| 7 | San Francisco | 30 | 10 | 14 | 6 | 29 | 19 | +10 | 44 | |
| 8 | Girona | 30 | 12 | 8 | 10 | 28 | 28 | 0 | 44 | |
| 9 | Manacor | 30 | 9 | 7 | 14 | 23 | 40 | −17 | 34 | |
| 10 | Bellvitge | 30 | 8 | 10 | 12 | 26 | 32 | −6 | 34 | |
| 11 | Gimnàstic | 30 | 9 | 7 | 14 | 36 | 49 | −13 | 34 | |
| 12 | Sant Andreu | 30 | 7 | 10 | 13 | 33 | 34 | −1 | 31 | |
| 13 | Ferriolense | 30 | 8 | 6 | 16 | 30 | 49 | −19 | 30 | Relegation to Liga Nacional |
| 14 | Atlético Baleares | 30 | 8 | 5 | 17 | 29 | 50 | −21 | 29 | Relegation to Liga Nacional |
| 15 | Santo Domingo | 30 | 6 | 5 | 19 | 31 | 64 | −33 | 23 | Relegation to Liga Nacional |
| 16 | Sabadell | 30 | 3 | 3 | 24 | 27 | 79 | −52 | 12 | Relegation to Liga Nacional |

Rules for classification: 1) Points; 2) Goal difference; 3) Number of goals scored

=== Group IV ===
| Pos | Team | Pld | W | D | L | GF | GA | GD | Pts | Qualification or relegation |
|---|---|---|---|---|---|---|---|---|---|---|
| 1 | Málaga | 34 | 23 | 6 | 5 | 94 | 34 | +60 | 75 | Qualification to Copa de Campeones |
| 2 | Sevilla | 34 | 23 | 6 | 5 | 109 | 28 | +81 | 75 | Qualification to Copa del Rey |
| 3 | Real Betis | 34 | 23 | 5 | 6 | 83 | 28 | +55 | 74 | Qualification to Copa del Rey |
| 4 | Córdoba | 34 | 22 | 6 | 6 | 84 | 39 | +45 | 72 | |
| 5 | Almería | 34 | 21 | 8 | 5 | 73 | 28 | +45 | 71 | |
| 6 | San Félix | 34 | 18 | 8 | 8 | 70 | 34 | +36 | 62 | |
| 7 | Granada | 34 | 17 | 5 | 12 | 62 | 43 | +19 | 56 | |
| 8 | Recreativo Huelva | 34 | 17 | 2 | 15 | 49 | 52 | −3 | 53 | |
| 9 | La Cañada Atlético | 34 | 15 | 7 | 12 | 48 | 40 | +8 | 52 | |
| 10 | Cádiz | 34 | 11 | 10 | 13 | 36 | 42 | −6 | 43 | |
| 11 | Tomares | 34 | 12 | 6 | 16 | 47 | 65 | −18 | 42 | |
| 12 | Sevilla Este | 34 | 11 | 3 | 20 | 47 | 69 | −22 | 36 | |
| 13 | Goyu-Ryu | 34 | 11 | 2 | 21 | 30 | 89 | −59 | 32 (Note: Goyu-Ryu was deducted 3 points.) | Relegation to Liga Nacional |
| 14 | Jaén | 34 | 9 | 4 | 21 | 43 | 74 | −31 | 31 | Relegation to Liga Nacional |
| 15 | San Juan | 34 | 8 | 6 | 20 | 34 | 68 | −34 | 30 | Relegation to Liga Nacional |
| 16 | Puerto Malagueño | 34 | 9 | 3 | 22 | 35 | 70 | −35 | 30 | Relegation to Liga Nacional |
| 17 | Rusadir | 34 | 7 | 6 | 21 | 29 | 70 | −41 | 27 | Relegation to Liga Nacional |
| 18 | Dos Hermanas (Note: Dos Hermanas withdrew.) | 34 | 1 | 3 | 30 | 13 | 113 | −100 | 0 (Note: Dos Hermanas was deducted 6 points.) | Relegation to Liga Nacional |

Rules for classification: 1) Points; 2) Goal difference; 3) Number of goals scored

=== Group V ===
| Pos | Team | Pld | W | D | L | GF | GA | GD | Pts | Qualification or relegation |
|---|---|---|---|---|---|---|---|---|---|---|
| 1 | Real Madrid | 30 | 23 | 5 | 2 | 99 | 21 | +78 | 74 | Qualification to Copa de Campeones |
| 2 | Atlético Madrid | 30 | 21 | 8 | 1 | 68 | 18 | +50 | 71 | Qualification to Copa de Campeones |
| 3 | Getafe | 30 | 17 | 7 | 6 | 55 | 22 | +33 | 58 | |
| 4 | Rayo Vallecano | 30 | 16 | 6 | 8 | 67 | 38 | +29 | 54 | |
| 5 | Valladolid | 30 | 15 | 5 | 10 | 49 | 33 | +16 | 50 | |
| 6 | Unión Adarve | 30 | 16 | 4 | 10 | 54 | 38 | +16 | 52 | |
| 7 | Diocesano | 30 | 11 | 7 | 12 | 49 | 52 | −3 | 40 | |
| 8 | Colegios Diocesanos | 30 | 11 | 6 | 13 | 42 | 55 | −13 | 39 | |
| 9 | Atlético Casarrubuelos | 30 | 11 | 5 | 14 | 34 | 51 | −17 | 38 | |
| 10 | Rayo Majadahonda | 30 | 10 | 6 | 14 | 41 | 61 | −20 | 36 | |
| 11 | Leganés | 30 | 9 | 8 | 13 | 48 | 57 | −9 | 35 | |
| 12 | Fútbol Peña | 30 | 8 | 11 | 11 | 36 | 42 | −6 | 35 | |
| 13 | Alcorcón | 30 | 9 | 6 | 15 | 31 | 49 | −18 | 33 | Relegation to Liga Nacional |
| 14 | RSD Alcalá | 30 | 8 | 6 | 16 | 26 | 48 | −22 | 30 | Relegation to Liga Nacional |
| 15 | Trival Valderas | 30 | 3 | 9 | 18 | 29 | 71 | −42 | 18 | Relegation to Liga Nacional |
| 16 | La Cruz Villanovense | 30 | 1 | 3 | 26 | 13 | 85 | −72 | 6 | Relegation to Liga Nacional |

Rules for classification: 1) Points; 2) Goal difference; 3) Number of goals scored

=== Group VI ===
| Pos | Team | Pld | W | D | L | GF | GA | GD | Pts | Qualification or relegation |
|---|---|---|---|---|---|---|---|---|---|---|
| 1 | Las Palmas | 32 | 29 | 2 | 1 | 107 | 17 | +90 | 89 | Qualification to Copa de Campeones |
| 2 | Tenerife | 32 | 20 | 4 | 8 | 64 | 30 | +34 | 64 | Qualification to Copa del Rey |
| 3 | Sobradillo | 32 | 19 | 5 | 8 | 60 | 32 | +28 | 62 | |
| 4 | San José | 32 | 19 | 4 | 9 | 66 | 36 | +30 | 61 | |
| 5 | Huracán | 32 | 18 | 6 | 8 | 58 | 31 | +27 | 60 | |
| 6 | Acodetti | 32 | 17 | 3 | 12 | 60 | 47 | +13 | 54 | |
| 7 | Orientación Marítima | 32 | 15 | 4 | 13 | 69 | 60 | +9 | 49 | |
| 8 | Laguna | 32 | 14 | 6 | 12 | 44 | 39 | +5 | 48 | |
| 9 | Longuera-Toscal | 32 | 14 | 6 | 12 | 63 | 51 | +12 | 48 | |
| 10 | Guía | 32 | 13 | 6 | 13 | 61 | 64 | −3 | 45 | |
| 11 | Arucas | 32 | 12 | 6 | 14 | 56 | 55 | +1 | 42 | |
| 12 | Estrella | 32 | 11 | 8 | 13 | 48 | 44 | +4 | 41 | |
| 13 | Marino | 32 | 11 | 4 | 17 | 56 | 72 | −16 | 37 | Relegation to Liga Nacional |
| 14 | Tahíche | 32 | 8 | 4 | 20 | 38 | 62 | −24 | 28 | Relegation to Liga Nacional |
| 15 | Las Zocas | 32 | 6 | 3 | 23 | 29 | 86 | −57 | 21 | Relegation to Liga Nacional |
| 16 | Telde | 32 | 4 | 4 | 24 | 26 | 105 | −79 | 16 | Relegation to Liga Nacional |
| 17 | San Pedro Mártir | 32 | 2 | 5 | 25 | 20 | 94 | −74 | 11 | Relegation to Liga Nacional |

Rules for classification: 1) Points; 2) Goal difference; 3) Number of goals scored

=== Group VII ===
| Pos | Team | Pld | W | D | L | GF | GA | GD | Pts | Qualification or relegation |
|---|---|---|---|---|---|---|---|---|---|---|
| 1 | Villarreal | 30 | 22 | 5 | 3 | 69 | 25 | +44 | 71 | Qualification to Copa de Campeones |
| 2 | Valencia | 30 | 18 | 11 | 1 | 65 | 28 | +37 | 65 | Qualification to Copa del Rey |
| 3 | Roda | 30 | 15 | 8 | 7 | 45 | 27 | +18 | 53 | |
| 4 | Elche | 30 | 16 | 4 | 10 | 49 | 31 | +18 | 52 | |
| 5 | Levante | 30 | 13 | 10 | 7 | 39 | 29 | +10 | 49 | |
| 6 | Ranero | 30 | 14 | 7 | 9 | 42 | 32 | +10 | 49 | |
| 7 | Kelme | 30 | 12 | 9 | 9 | 41 | 29 | +12 | 45 | |
| 8 | Atlético Madrileño | 30 | 12 | 6 | 12 | 46 | 34 | +12 | 42 | |
| 9 | Murcia | 30 | 11 | 5 | 14 | 42 | 48 | −6 | 38 | |
| 10 | Hércules | 30 | 10 | 8 | 12 | 37 | 44 | −7 | 38 | |
| 11 | UCAM Murcia | 30 | 9 | 9 | 12 | 34 | 44 | −10 | 36 | |
| 12 | Albacete | 30 | 8 | 12 | 10 | 34 | 37 | −3 | 36 | |
| 13 | Castellón | 30 | 8 | 8 | 14 | 45 | 47 | −2 | 32 | Relegation to Liga Nacional |
| 14 | Huracán Moncada | 30 | 5 | 8 | 17 | 27 | 55 | −28 | 23 | Relegation to Liga Nacional |
| 15 | Lorquí | 30 | 3 | 9 | 18 | 27 | 58 | −31 | 18 | Relegation to Liga Nacional |
| 16 | Albacer | 30 | 3 | 3 | 24 | 25 | 99 | −74 | 12 | Relegation to Liga Nacional |

Rules for classification: 1) Points; 2) Goal difference; 3) Number of goals scored

=== Ranking of second-placed teams ===
In teams with groups with more than 16 teams, matches against the teams placed 17th and 18th in each of the groups would not be included in the ranking of the second-placed teams. The best runner-up will qualify for the Copa de Campeones.

The seven best runners-up are determined by the following parameters, in this order:

1. Highest number of points
2. Goal difference
3. Highest number of goals scored

| Pos | Grp | Team | Pld | W | D | L | PF | PA | PD | Pts | Qualification |
|---|---|---|---|---|---|---|---|---|---|---|---|
| 1 | V | Atlético Madrid | 30 | 21 | 8 | 1 | 68 | 18 | +50 | 71 | Qualification to Copa de Campeones |
| 2 | I | Sporting Gijón | 30 | 22 | 3 | 5 | 100 | 27 | +73 | 69 | |
| 3 | IV | Sevilla | 30 | 21 | 4 | 5 | 98 | 27 | +71 | 67 | |
| 4 | VII | Valencia | 30 | 18 | 11 | 1 | 65 | 28 | +37 | 65 | |
| 5 | III | Mallorca | 30 | 19 | 7 | 4 | 59 | 17 | +42 | 64 | |
| 6 | II | Alavés | 30 | 18 | 8 | 4 | 64 | 34 | +30 | 62 | |
| 7 | VI | Tenerife | 30 | 18 | 4 | 8 | 58 | 30 | +28 | 58 | |

=== Ranking of third-placed teams ===
In teams with groups with more than 16 teams, matches against the teams placed 17th and 18th in each of the groups would not be included in the ranking of the third-placed teams. The two best third-placed will qualify for the Copa del Rey.

The seven best third-placed are determined by the following parameters, in this order:

1. Highest number of points
2. Goal difference
3. Highest number of goals scored

| Pos | Grp | Team | Pld | W | D | L | PF | PA | PD | Pts | Qualification |
|---|---|---|---|---|---|---|---|---|---|---|---|
| 1 | I | Deportivo La Coruña | 30 | 20 | 7 | 3 | 86 | 35 | +51 | 67 | Qualification to Copa del Rey |
| 2 | IV | Real Betis | 30 | 19 | 5 | 6 | 64 | 26 | +38 | 62 | Qualification to Copa del Rey |
| 3 | III | Espanyol | 30 | 17 | 9 | 4 | 54 | 24 | +30 | 60 | |
| 4 | II | Athletic Bilbao | 30 | 18 | 5 | 7 | 69 | 41 | +28 | 59 | |
| 5 | V | Getafe | 30 | 17 | 7 | 6 | 55 | 22 | +33 | 58 | |
| 6 | VI | Sobradillo | 30 | 17 | 5 | 8 | 55 | 31 | +24 | 56 | |
| 7 | VII | Roda | 30 | 15 | 8 | 7 | 45 | 27 | +18 | 53 | |

== Copa de Campeones ==
The seven group champions and the best runner-up were qualified to this competition whose winner will play the 2017–18 UEFA Youth League. The draw was held at the headquarters of the Galician Football Federation on 11 April 2017.

The quarterfinals will be played in Ribadumia and Portonovo, Pontevedra, while the semifinals and the finals at Estadio O Couto, in Ourense.

Quarterfinals; 1 May
IV | Málaga | 4
III | Barcelona | 2
II | Osasuna | 1
I | Celta Vigo | 2
WC | Atlético Madrid | 1
V | Real Madrid | 2
VI | Las Palmas | 0
VII | Villarreal | 2

Semifinals; 3 May
IV | Málaga | 3
I | Celta Vigo | 2
V | Real Madrid | 2
VII | Villarreal | 0

Final; 6 May
IV | Málaga | 0
V | Real Madrid (a.e.t.) | 1

=== Quarter-finals ===
| 1 May 2017 | Málaga | 4–2 | Barcelona | Portonovo |
| 10:00 | Hugo 15'; Arimany 66'; Escardó 72' (pen.); Jony 90+1' | Quarterfinal | Carles Pérez 19' (pen.), 38' | Stadium: Baltar; Attendance: 800; Referee: Óscar Martínez Santos |

| 1 May 2017 | Osasuna | 1–2 | Celta Vigo | Portonovo |
| 12:30 | Hualde 38' | | Rey 7'; Sobrido 10' | Stadium: O Couto; Attendance: 1,200; Referee: Sergio Espasandín Cores |

| 1 May 2017 | Atlético Madrid | 1–2 | Real Madrid | Ribadumia |
| 16:00 | Giovanni 9' | | Óscar 11'; Fran García 48' | Stadium: A Senra; Attendance: 2,500; Referee: Javier Iglesias Villanueva |

| 1 May 2017 | Las Palmas | 0–2 | Villarreal | Ribadumia |
| 18:30 | | | Millán 34'; Villa 59' | Stadium: A Senra; Attendance: 1,000; Referee: Alain Kevin García Martín |

=== Semifinals ===
| 3 May 2017 | Málaga | 3–2 | Celta Vigo | Ourense |
| 12:00 | Alberto García 72'; Escardó 84', 90+2' | Semifinal | Alberto Solís 26'; Ton 87' | Stadium: O Couto; Attendance: 1,000; Referee: Fernández Rodríguez |

| 3 May 2017 | Real Madrid | 2–0 | Villarreal | Ourense |
| 17:00 | Dani Gómez 4', 21' | | | Stadium: O Couto; Attendance: 2,000; Referee: Alejandro Muñiz Ruiz |

=== Final ===
| 6 May 2017 | Málaga | 0 – 1 (a.e.t.) | Real Madrid | Ourense |
| 12:00 | | Report | Óscar 115' | Stadium: O Couto; Attendance: 4,000; Referee: Pablo Brea Peón |

Copa de Campeones
winners

7th title

==== Details ====
| Málaga | Real Madrid |

MÁLAGA:
| GK | 1 | (Spain) Kellyan |
| DF | 12 | (Brazil) Eppy |
| DF | 4 | (Spain) Juande |
| DF | 3 | (Spain) Alejandro |
| DF | 2 | (Spain) Álex Robles (c) | (yellow card) 119' |
| MF | 10 | (Hungary) Mátyás Tajti | (yellow card) 20' | (substituted off) 46' |
| MF | 6 | (Spain) Iván |
| MF | 8 | (Spain) José Carlos | (yellow card) 85' | (substituted off) 89' |
| FW | 18 | (Morocco) Hicham | | (substituted off) 67' |
| FW | 9 | (Spain) Arimany |
| FW | 11 | (Spain) Alberto | (yellow card) 76' | (substituted off) 78' |
Substitutes:
| GK | 13 | (Spain) Javi Cuenca |
| DF | 5 | (Morocco) Yousef |
| DF | 14 | (Spain) Jesús Cedenilla | | (substituted on) 89' |
| MF | 7 | (Spain) Hugo | | (substituted on) 46' |
| FW | 15 | (Spain) Jony |
| FW | 16 | (Spain) Alejandro Escardó | | (substituted on) 67' |
| FW | 17 | (Spain) Antoñín | | (substituted on) 78' |
Manager:
(Panama) Julio Dely Valdés

REAL MADRID:
| GK | 1 | (Spain) Javi Belman |
| DF | 2 | (Spain) Gorka Zabarte | | (substituted off) 83' |
| DF | 5 | (Spain) Manu Hernando |
| DF | 12 | (Spain) Javi |
| DF | 3 | (Spain) Fran García |
| MF | 6 | (Spain) Martín | (yellow card) 30' (yellow-red card) 32' |
| MF | 7 | (Spain) Alberto Fernández | (yellow card) 113' |
| MF | 8 | (Spain) Toni Segura |
| MF | 10 | (Spain) Óscar (c) | (yellow card) 75' |
| MF | 11 | (Argentina) Franchu | | (substituted off) 101' |
| FW | 9 | (Spain) Dani Gómez | | (substituted off) 111' |
Substitutes:
| GK | 13 | (Spain) Dario |
| DF | 4 | (Spain) Álex |
| DF | 15 | (Spain) Soti | | (substituted on) 83' |
| MF | 14 | (Netherlands) Mink Peeters |
| MF | 16 | (Spain) Álvaro |
| MF | 17 | (Spain) Echu | | (substituted on) 101' |
| FW | 18 | (Spain) Javi Llario | | (substituted on) 111' |
Manager:
(Spain) Guti

== See also ==
- 2017 Copa del Rey Juvenil
