= 2017 Copa del Rey Juvenil =

Tournament details
- Country: Spain
- Teams: 16

Final positions
- Champions: Real Madrid
- Runners-up: Atlético Madrid

Tournament statistics
- Matches played: 29
- Goals scored: 88 (3.03 per match)

The 2017 Copa del Rey Juvenil is the 67th staging of the Copa del Rey Juvenil de Fútbol. The competition started on May 13, 2017 and finished on June 25, 2017.

== First round ==
The top two teams from each group of the 2016–17 División de Honor Juvenil de Fútbol and the two best third-placed teams were drawn into a two-game best aggregate score series. The first leg was played on May 13 and 14 and the return leg on May 20 and 21.

Team 1	Agg.	Team 2	1st leg	2nd leg
Mallorca	4–3	Betis	3–1	1–2
Atlético Madrid	3–2	Tenerife	2–1	1–1
Las Palmas	3–5	Real Madrid	1–3	2–2
Barcelona	4–1	Sporting Gijón	1–1	3–0
Sevilla	3–3 (a)	Valencia	2–0	1–3
Alavés	1–2	Celta Vigo	0–0	1–2
Deportivo La Coruña	3–0	Osasuna	2–0	1–0
Villarreal	4–3	Málaga	1–1	3–2

== Quarterfinals ==
The eight winners from the first round advance to quarterfinals, that are played in a two-game series. The first leg was played on May 27 and 28 and the second leg on June 3 and 4.

Team 1	Agg.	Team 2	1st leg	2nd leg
Celta Vigo	2–5	Atlético Madrid	1–0	1–5
Sevilla	3–1	Deportivo La Coruña	2–1	1–0
Villarreal	6–5	Barcelona	3–0	3–5
Real Madrid	6–2	Mallorca	5–1	1–1

== Semifinals ==
The four winners from the quarterfinals advance to semifinals, that are played in a two-game series. The first leg was played on June 10 and 11 and the second leg on June 18.

Team 1	Agg.	Team 2	1st leg	2nd leg
Real Madrid	3–0	Villarreal	2–0	1–0
Sevilla	3–3 (a)	Atlético Madrid	3–1	0–2

== Final ==
The semifinal winners play a one-game final at Calahorra in La Rioja on June 25.

25 June 2017
11:30 CEST (UTC+02:00)

Real Madrid	4 – 1 (a.e.t.)	Atlético Madrid
Óscar 12'; Alberto 96'; Toni 98'; César 115'	report	Óscar Clemente 44'

Municipal de La Planilla,
Calahorra, La Rioja
Attendance: 3,500
Referee: Ángel Hernández

Real Madrid	Atlético Madrid

REAL MADRID:
GK	1	(Spain) Javi Belman
DF	2	(Morocco) Achraf
DF	4	(Spain) Manu
DF	5	(Spain) Álex
DF	3	(Spain) Cobo	(substituted off) 80'
MF	6	(Spain) Martín	(substituted off) 54'
MF	7	(Spain) Alberto
MF	8	(Spain) Toni	(substituted off) 112'
MF	10	(Spain) Óscar (C)
MF	11	(Argentina) Franchu	(substituted off) 67'
FW	9	(Spain) Dani Gómez
Substitutes:
GK	13	(Spain) Darío
DF	12	(Spain) Javi	(substituted on) 54'
MF	14	(Netherlands) Mink	(substituted on) 112'
DF	15	(Spain) Soti	(substituted on) 80'
FW	16	(Spain) César	(substituted on) 67'
Manager: Guti

ATLÉTICO MADRID
GK	1	(Brazil) Álex dos Santos
DF	2	(Spain) Miguel Acosta	(substituted off) 70'
DF	4	(Spain) Aitor
DF	5	(Spain) JC
DF	3	(Spain) Lalo
MF	10	(Spain) Óscar Clemente	(substituted off) 64'
MF	6	(Spain) Mikel
MF	8	(Spain) Yael (C)	(substituted off) 81'
MF	11	(Argentina) Juan Agüero
FW	7	(Spain) Giovanni
FW	9	(Spain) Alberto Ródenas	(substituted off) 61'
Substitutes:
GK	13	(Spain) Diego Conde
MF	12	(Spain) Carlos Isaac	(substituted on) 70'
MF		(Dominican Republic) Manny	(substituted on) 64'	Booked
MF		(Spain) Relu	(substituted on) 81'
FW	16	(Spain) Pablo	(substituted on) 61'
Manager: Manolo Cano

Copa del Rey Juvenil
Winners
Real Madrid
(13th title)

== See also ==
- 2016 Copa del Rey Juvenil (final played between same clubs)
- 2018 Copa del Rey Juvenil (final played between same clubs)
- 2016–17 División de Honor Juvenil de Fútbol
