= Raúl Navas (footballer, born 1988) =

Spanish footballer

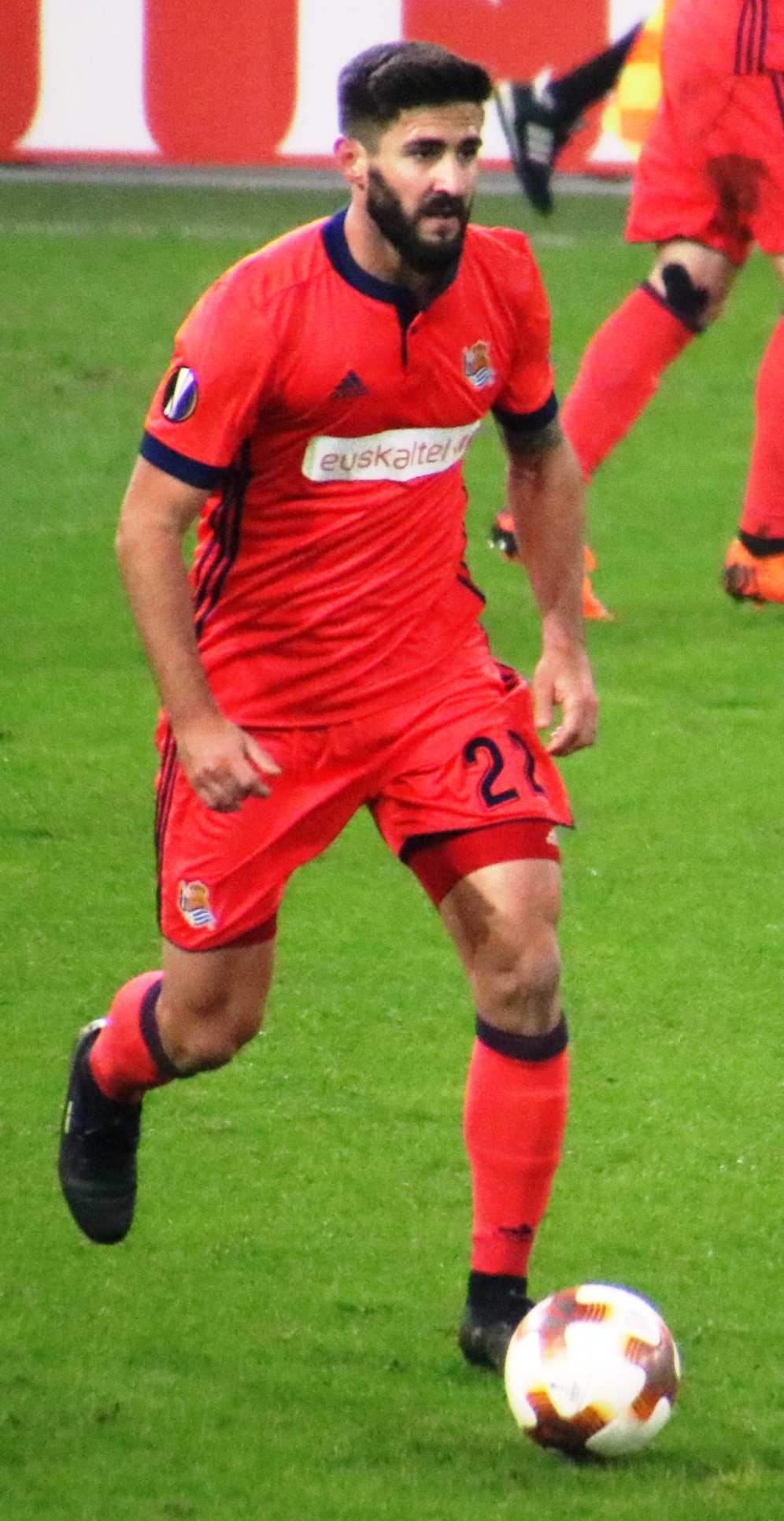
- Navas with Real Sociedad in 2018

Personal information
- Full name: Raúl Rodríguez Navas
- Date of birth: 11 May 1988 (age 38)
- Place of birth: Seville, Spain
- Height: 1.86 m (6 ft 1 in)
- Position: Centre-back

Team information
- Current team: Central

Youth career
- Sevilla

Senior career*
Years	Team	Apps	(Gls)
2007–2009	Sevilla C	46	(1)
2009	Sevilla B	2	(0)
2009–2010	Valladolid B	35	(4)
2010–2011	Valladolid	4	(0)
2011–2012	Celta B	23	(2)
2011	Celta	0	(0)
2012–2014	Eibar	73	(5)
2014–2020	Real Sociedad	68	(1)
2014–2015	→ Eibar (loan)	29	(2)
2019–2020	→ Osasuna (loan)	9	(0)
2020–2021	Osasuna	2	(0)
2021	Cartagena	16	(0)
2021–2022	Las Palmas	35	(1)
2022–2023	Mirandés	27	(1)
2023–2025	Recreativo	48	(2)
2025–	Central	37	(1)
- * Club domestic league appearances and goals as of 18:11, 30 September 2026 (UTC)

Raúl Rodríguez Navas (born 11 May 1988) is a Spanish professional footballer who plays as a centre-back for Segunda Federación club Central.

== Club career ==
Born in Seville, Andalusia, Navas played youth football with local Sevilla FC, making his senior debut in 2007–08 season with the C team in the Tercera División. He played his first professional match on 30 May 2009, appearing with the reserves in a 0–4 Segunda División home loss against CD Tenerife and also being sent off.

Navas signed with Real Valladolid in July 2009, initially being assigned to the B side. On 16 May 2010, the day the Castile and León club certified its relegation, he made his La Liga debut, starting the 4–0 away defeat to champions FC Barcelona. In his second year, he appeared in a further five official games with the first team, being released in August 2011.

In the following years, Navas competed in the Segunda División B, with Celta de Vigo B and SD Eibar. He achieved two consecutive promotions with the latter, in 2013 and in 2014.

On 12 July 2014, Navas signed a one-year deal with Real Sociedad, being immediately loaned back to Eibar. He was also utilised in their top-flight debut on 24 August, starting the 1–0 home victory over his parent club.

Navas scored his first goal in the Spanish top tier on 8 December, the third in a 5–2 home rout of UD Almería. On 3 June 2015, the Txuri-urdin activated a clause in his contract and extended his link until 2018. He missed the entire season due to a pubalgia ailment.

On 14 August 2019, Navas joined CA Osasuna on a season-long move, with an obligatory buyout clause at the end of the loan. He terminated his contract with the club on 26 January 2021, and immediately moved to second division side FC Cartagena for 18 months.

On 19 July 2021, Navas signed a 1+1 deal with UD Las Palmas also in the second tier, after exercising the rescision clause on his previous contract. He severed his ties in September 2022, and agreed to a one-year deal at CD Mirandés.

Navas spent the rest of his career in the lower leagues and amateur football. Aged 38, he achieved promotion to Segunda Federación with CA Central.

== Honours ==
Eibar

- Segunda División: 2013–14
