= Noah Lundström =

Finnish footballer (born 1999)

Personal information
- Full name: Noah Odin Lundström
- Date of birth: 9 September 1999 (age 27)
- Place of birth: Kokkola, Finland
- Height: 1.78 m (5 ft 10 in)
- Position: Forward

Team information
- Current team: Gefle IF
- Number: 23

Youth career
- Ruskon Pallo –67
- Turun Nappulaliiga
- Inter Turku

Senior career*
Years	Team	Apps	(Gls)
2014–2018	AD Las Lagunas	3	(0)
2019	EIF Akademi	11	(4)
2019–2023	Mijas-Las Lagunas	100	(27)
2023–2024	EIF	31	(6)
2025	JäPS	0	(0)
2025	AFC Eskilstuna	29	(9)
2026–	Gefle IF	26	(2)
- * Club domestic league appearances and goals as of 16 November 206

Noah Odin Lunström (born 9 September 1999) is a Finnish professional footballer who plays as a forward for Gefle IF.

== Early life ==
Born in Kokkola, Finland, to parents from Pietarsaari, Lundström moved to Turku with his family at an early age. He played football in the youth sectors of local clubs Ruskon Pallo –67, Turun Nappulaliiga and Inter Turku, before moving to Spain with his family. He continued playing football in Spain in lower divisions with AD Las Lagunas.

== Club career ==
Lundström lived in Spain for ten years in total until July 2023, when he returned to Finland and signed with Ekenäs IF (EIF) in then second-tier Ykkönen. The club went on to win the Ykkönen title and won a promotion to Veikkausliiga, and Lundström's deal was extended in November. He debuted in the league with EIF on 6 April 2024, scoring a brace in a 3–2 away loss against IFK Mariehamn.

== Career statistics ==
As of 16 November 2026

Appearances and goals by club, season and competition
Club	Season	League			Cup (Note: Includes Suomen Cup)		Other		Total	
Club	Season	Division	Apps	Goals	Apps	Goals	Apps	Goals	Apps	Goals
AD Las Lagunas	2014–15	Segunda Andaluza	1	0	–		–		1	0
AD Las Lagunas	2015–16	Cuarta Andaluza	0	0	–		–		0	0
AD Las Lagunas	2016–17	Segunda Andaluza	2	0	–		–		2	0
AD Las Lagunas	2017–18	Tercera Andaluza	0	0	–		–		0	0
AD Las Lagunas	Total		3	0	0	0	0	0	3	0
EIF Akademi	2019	Kolmonen	11	4	–		–		11	4
Mijas-Las Lagunas	2019–20	Primera Andaluza	21	4	–		–		21	4
Mijas-Las Lagunas	2020–21	Primera Andaluza	28	10	–		–		28	10
Mijas-Las Lagunas	2021–22	Primera Andaluza	30	10	–		8 (Note: Includes Copa de Andalucia)	1	38	11
Mijas-Las Lagunas	2022–23	División de Honor Andalucia	21	3	–		1	1	22	4
Mijas-Las Lagunas	Total		100	27	0	0	9	2	109	29
Ekenäs IF	2023	Ykkönen	13	4	0	0	0	0	13	4
Ekenäs IF	2024	Veikkausliiga	18	2	2	3	5 (Note: Includes Finnish League Cup)	0	25	5
Ekenäs IF	Total		31	6	2	3	5	0	38	9
EIF Akademi	2024	Kolmonen	1	1	–		–		1	1
JäPS	2025	Ykkösliiga	0	0	0	0	1	0	1	0
AFC Eskilstuna	2025	Ettan	29	9	0	0	–		29	9
Gefle IF	2026	Ettan	26	2	1	0	–		27	2
Career total			201	49	3	3	15	2	219	54

== Honours ==
EIF

- Ykkönen: 2023
