= Lucas Macazaga =

Bolivian footballer (born 2006)

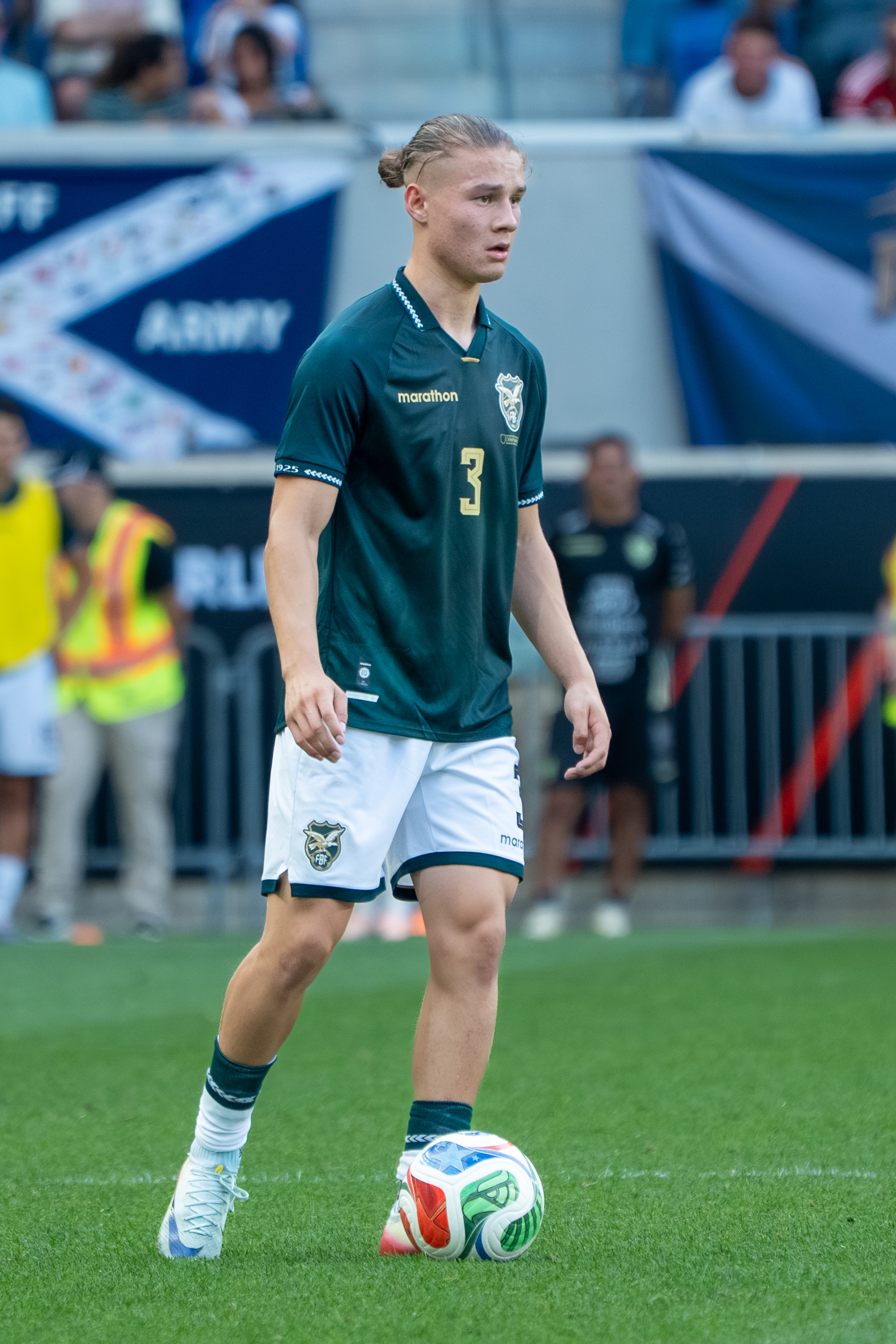
- Macazaga with Bolivia in 2026

Personal information
- Full name: Lucas Dionis Macazaga Ojopi
- Date of birth: 16 August 2006 (age 20)
- Place of birth: Madrid, Spain
- Height: 1.83 m (6 ft 0 in)
- Position: Right-back

Team information
- Current team: Ponferradina (on loan from Leganés)
- Number: 20

Youth career
- Chimenea
- 2018–2021: Getafe
- 2021–2022: Alcorcón
- 2022–2025: Leganés

Senior career*
Years	Team	Apps	(Gls)
2025–	Leganés	0	(0)
2025–	Leganés B	20	(3)
2026–	→ Ponferradina (loan)	0	(0)

International career^{‡}
2025–	Bolivia U20	6	(0)
2025–	Bolivia	7	(0)
- * Club domestic league appearances and goals as of 9 June 2026 ‡ National team caps and goals as of 10 June 2026

Lucas Dionis Macazaga Ojopi (born 17 August 2006) is a footballer who plays as a right back for Spanish club SD Ponferradina, on loan from CD Leganés. Born in Spain, he plays for the Bolivia national team.

== Club career ==
Born in Madrid, Spain, Macazaga began playing football aged 6 at Chimenea FC. He then played in the youth ranks of Getafe CF before joining CD Leganés at the beginning of his adolescence.

From 2025–26, Macazaga played for the reserve team in the fifth-tier Tercera Federación, helping the club compete for promotion with one of the best defensive records. At the start of 2026, he extended his contract to June of the following year.

On 22 July 2026, Macazaga was loaned to Primera Federación side SD Ponferradina, for one year.

== International career ==
Possessing dual nationality due to his parents being from Beni Department in Bolivia, Macazaga was approached by the Bolivian Football Federation, who called him up for the under-20 team's friendlies against Argentina in November 2024. Early in the new year, he played in the 2025 South American U-20 Championship.

In March 2025, manager Óscar Villegas called Macazaga up to the senior national team ahead of 2026 FIFA World Cup qualifiers against Peru and Uruguay. He made his debut on 14 November in a 2–0 friendly defeat away to South Korea, as a last-minute substitute.

== Personal life ==
Prior to his international debut with Bolivia, Macazaga became a subject of discussion in his country due to a perceived physical similarity to Erling Haaland or Darwin Núñez. He said that the comparisons to the Norwegian did not put him under pressure, but instead motivated him.

== Career statistics ==
=== Club ===
As of match played 24 May 2026

Appearances and goals by club, season and competition
Club	Season	League			Cup		Other		Total	
Club	Season	Division	Apps	Goals	Apps	Goals	Apps	Goals	Apps	Goals
Leganés	2025–26	Segunda División	0	0	0	0	—		0	0
Leganés B	2025–26	Tercera Federación	20	3	—		2 (Note: Appearances in 2026 Tercera Federación play-offs)	0	22	3
Ponferradina (loan)	2026–27	Primera Federación	0	0	0	0	—		0	0
career total			20	3	0	0	2	0	22	3

=== International ===
As of match played 10 June 2026

National team	Year	Apps	Goals
Bolivia	2025	1	0
Bolivia	2026	6	0
Total		7	0
