= Betancor =

Betancor is a surname. Notable people with the surname include:

- Jefté Betancor (born 1993), Spanish footballer
- Jeremy Betancor (born 1998), Spanish footballer
