= Joan Monterde =

Spanish footballer (born 1997)

Personal information
- Full name: Joan Monterde Raygal
- Date of birth: 18 December 1997 (age 28)
- Place of birth: Sagunto, Spain
- Height: 1.68 m (5 ft 6 in)
- Position: Winger

Youth career
- Villarreal
- 2011–2016: Levante

Senior career*
Years	Team	Apps	(Gls)
2016–2021	Levante B	105	(10)
2016–2017	→ Izarra (loan)	25	(0)
2020	Levante	1	(0)
2021–2023	Lleida	58	(2)
2023–2024	La Nucía	32	(0)
2024–2025	Conquense	32	(8)
2025–2026	Orihuela	31	(8)
- * Club domestic league appearances and goals as of 16 May 2026

Joan Monterde Raygal (born 18 December 1997) is a Spanish professional footballer who plays as a right winger.

== Club career ==
Born in Sagunto, Valencian Community, Monterde joined Levante UD's youth setup in 2011, from Villarreal CF. On 31 August 2016, after finishing his formation, he was loaned to Segunda División B side CD Izarra for the season, and made his senior debut on 25 September of that year by playing the last 20 minutes in a 0–2 away loss against Pontevedra CF.

Upon returning to the Granotas, Monterde was assigned to the reserves in Tercera División. On 9 January 2018, he renewed his contract until 2020, and scored his first senior goal five days later, netting his team's first in a 2–2 draw at Elche CF Ilicitano.

On 19 May 2020, Monterde extended his contract with Levante until 2021. He made his first team – and La Liga – debut on 19 July, coming on as a late substitute for Gonzalo Melero in a 1–0 home defeat of Getafe CF.
