= Esteban Sachetti =

Argentine footballer

Esteban
Personal information
- Full name: Esteban Fernando Sachetti
- Date of birth: 21 November 1985 (age 40)
- Place of birth: Tucumán, Argentina
- Height: 1.70 m (5 ft 7 in)
- Position: Defensive midfielder

Team information
- Current team: Atlético Central

Senior career*
| Years | Team | Apps | (Gls) |
| 2007–2009 | Sevilla C | 55 | (1) |
| 2009–2010 | Sevilla B | 14 | (0) |
| 2010–2011 | San Fernando | 30 | (2) |
| 2011–2013 | Doxa Katokopias | 43 | (0) |
| 2013–2015 | AEL Limassol | 47 | (2) |
| 2015–2021 | Apollon Limassol | 138 | (2) |
| 2021–2022 | Alki Oroklini | 13 | (0) |
| 2023 | Coria | 12 | (0) |
| 2023– | Atlético Central | 5 | (1) |
- * Club domestic league appearances and goals as of 13 October 2024

Esteban Fernando Sachetti (born 21 November 1985) is an Argentine footballer who plays as a defensive midfielder for Spanish Tercera Federación club Atlético Central.

== Career statistics ==
As of 11 May 2021

| Club | Season | League | | | Cup | | Continental | | Other | | Total | |
| Club | Season | Division | Apps | Goals | Apps | Goals | Apps | Goals | Apps | Goals | Apps | Goals |
|---|---|---|---|---|---|---|---|---|---|---|---|---|
| Doxa Katokopias | 2011–12 | Cypriot Second Division | 31 | 0 | 0 | 0 | — | | — | | 31 | 0 |
| Doxa Katokopias | 2012–13 | Cypriot First Division | 12 | 0 | 0 | 0 | — | | — | | 12 | 0 |
| Doxa Katokopias | Total | | 43 | 0 | 0 | 0 | — | | — | | 43 | 0 |
| AEL Limassol | 2012–13 | Cypriot First Division | 13 | 1 | 6 | 0 | — | | — | | 19 | 1 |
| AEL Limassol | 2013–14 | Cypriot First Division | 21 | 1 | 2 | 0 | — | | — | | 23 | 1 |
| AEL Limassol | 2014–15 | Cypriot First Division | 13 | 0 | 5 | 0 | 0 | 0 | — | | 18 | 0 |
| AEL Limassol | Total | | 47 | 2 | 13 | 0 | 0 | 0 | — | | 60 | 2 |
| Apollon Limassol | 2015–16 | Cypriot First Division | 23 | 0 | 3 | 0 | 6 | 0 | — | | 32 | 0 |
| Apollon Limassol | 2016–17 | Cypriot First Division | 29 | 0 | 6 | 0 | 1 | 0 | 1 | 0 | 37 | 0 |
| Apollon Limassol | 2017–18 | Cypriot First Division | 30 | 0 | 5 | 0 | 11 | 0 | 1 | 0 | 47 | 0 |
| Apollon Limassol | 2018–19 | Cypriot First Division | 23 | 1 | 2 | 0 | 13 | 1 | — | | 38 | 2 |
| Apollon Limassol | 2019–20 | Cypriot First Division | 16 | 1 | 5 | 0 | 4 | 0 | — | | 25 | 1 |
| Apollon Limassol | 2020–21 | Cypriot First Division | 17 | 0 | 0 | 0 | 3 | 0 | — | | 20 | 0 |
| Apollon Limassol | Total | | 138 | 2 | 21 | 0 | 38 | 1 | 2 | 0 | 199 | 3 |
| Career total | | | 228 | 4 | 34 | 0 | 38 | 1 | 2 | 0 | 302 | 5 |
