= Jeremy Betancor =

Spanish footballer

Personal information
- Full name: Jeremy José Betancor Santana
- Date of birth: 10 September 1998 (age 28)
- Place of birth: Las Palmas, Spain
- Position: Forward

Youth career
- Puertos LP
- 2014–2017: Las Palmas

Senior career*
Years	Team	Apps	(Gls)
2016–2020	Las Palmas B		
2016–2020	Las Palmas	0	(0)
2019	→ Tamaraceite (loan)	14	(2)
2019	→ Santa Brígida (loan)	13	(2)
2020	Unión Viera	6	(1)
- * Club domestic league appearances and goals as of 20:45, 4 June 2023 (UTC)

Jeremy José Betancor Santana (born 10 September 1998) is a Spanish footballer who plays as a forward.

== Club career ==
Born in Las Palmas, Canary Islands, Jeremy joined UD Las Palmas' youth setup in 2014, from CEF Puertos de Las Palmas. On 5 January 2016, before even having appeared for the reserves, he was called up with the first team for a Copa del Rey match against SD Eibar.

Jeremy made his professional debut on 7 January 2016, coming on as a first-half substitute for injured Asdrúbal in a 3–2 win at the Ipurua Municipal Stadium.
