= Echu =

Spanish footballer

Personal information
- Full name: Jesús Rodríguez Ortuño
- Date of birth: 11 February 1998 (age 28)
- Place of birth: Almuñécar, Spain
- Height: 1.73 m (5 ft 8 in)
- Position: Winger

Team information
- Current team: Málaga City

Youth career
- 2009–2010: Granada
- 2010–2012: Almería
- 2012–2016: Málaga
- 2016–2017: Real Madrid

Senior career*
Years	Team	Apps	(Gls)
2017–2019	Real Madrid B	0	(0)
2017–2018	→ El Ejido (loan)	32	(4)
2018–2019	→ Rayo Majadahonda (loan)	0	(0)
2019–2023	Granada B	69	(4)
2023–	Málaga City	24	(2)
- * Club domestic league appearances and goals as of 10:42, 29 July 2024 (UTC)

Jesús Rodríguez Ortuño (born 11 February 1998), commonly known as Echu, is a Spanish footballer who plays as a left winger for Málaga City.

== Club career ==
Born in Almuñécar, Granada, Andalusia, Echu joined Real Madrid's La Fábrica in 2016, from Málaga CF. On 17 July 2017, he was loaned to Segunda División B side CD El Ejido for one year.

Echu made his senior debut on 20 August 2017, coming on as a second-half substitute in a 0–0 away draw against FC Jumilla. He scored his first senior goal on 24 September 2017 by netting his team's second in a 5–1 home routing of CF Lorca Deportiva, and finished the season with four goals in 32 appearances.

On 16 July 2018, Echu joined Segunda División side CF Rayo Majadahonda also in a temporary deal. He made his professional debut on 13 September, starting in a 2–1 away defeat of UD Las Palmas, for the season's Copa del Rey.

On 20 July 2019, Echu moved to Granada CF, a club he already represented as a youth, and was assigned to the reserves in the third division.
