= Jorge Valín =

Spanish footballer

Personal information
- Full name: Jorge Valín Sánchez
- Date of birth: 7 January 2000 (age 26)
- Place of birth: A Coruña, Spain
- Height: 1.76 m (5 ft 9 in)
- Position: Right-back

Team information
- Current team: Compostela

Youth career
- Victoria
- 2014–2018: Deportivo La Coruña

Senior career*
Years	Team	Apps	(Gls)
2017–2020	Deportivo B	42	(0)
2019–2022	Deportivo La Coruña	15	(0)
2022	→ Cornellà (loan)	13	(0)
2022–2023	Numancia	34	(0)
2024	La Nucía	7	(0)
2024–2025	UE Santa Coloma	18	(1)
2025–	Compostela	5	(1)
- * Club domestic league appearances and goals as of 5 October 2025

Jorge Valín Sánchez (born 14 March 2000) is a Spanish professional footballer who plays for Tercera Federación club Compostela as a right-back.

== Club career ==
Born in A Coruña, Galicia, Valín joined Deportivo de La Coruña's youth setup in 2014, from Victoria CF. He made his senior debut with the reserves on 8 October 2017, playing the entire second half of a 1–0 Segunda División B home win against Real Valladolid B.

On 31 May 2019, after establishing himself as a starter for the B-team, Valín renewed his contract with Dépor for two further seasons. He made his first team debut on 13 October, playing the full 90 minutes in a 0–3 away loss against UD Las Palmas in the Segunda División.
