= Joel Arimany =

Spanish footballer

Personal information
- Full name: Joel Arimany Sala
- Date of birth: 28 May 1998 (age 28)
- Place of birth: Quart, Spain
- Height: 1.87 m (6 ft 1 1/2 in)
- Position: Forward

Team information
- Current team: Figueres

Youth career
- 2008–2017: Girona
- 2016–2017: → Málaga (loan)

Senior career*
Years	Team	Apps	(Gls)
2015–2018	Girona	1	(0)
2016–2017	→ Málaga B (loan)	1	(0)
2017–2018	Peralada	25	(7)
2018–2019	Málaga B	15	(2)
2019	Olot	8	(0)
2020–2021	Zaragoza B	10	(0)
2021–	Figueres	0	(0)
- * Club domestic league appearances and goals as of 9 May 2021

Joel Arimany Sala (born 28 May 1998) is a Spanish footballer who plays for UE Figueres as a forward.

== Club career ==
Born in Quart, Girona, Catalonia, Arimany was a Girona FC youth graduate. In July 2015, after being called up by first team manager Pablo Machín for the pre-season, he was linked to Málaga CF, but nothing came of it.

On 11 August 2015, Arimany signed a new four-year deal with the Blanquivermells. On 24 October, without even appearing with the reserves, Arimany made his main squad debut, coming on as a late substitute for Felipe Sanchón in a 0–0 home draw against Real Zaragoza in the Segunda División.

On 20 July 2016, Arimany was loaned to Málaga, returning to youth football. Upon returning, he was assigned to the B-team in Segunda División B before returning to Málaga on 27 August 2018; he was assigned to the reserves also in the third division.

On 8 January 2020, after a short stint at UE Olot, Arimany moved to another reserve team, Deportivo Aragón still in division three.
