= CF La Nucía =

Spanish football team

La Nucía
- Full name: Club de Fútbol La Nucía
- Founded: 1995
- Ground: Camilo Cano, La Nucía, Valencia, Spain
- Capacity: 3,000
- President: Raul Gómez Zaragoza
- Head coach: Vicente Mir
- League: Segunda Federación – Group 3
- 2025–26: Tercera Federación – Group 6, 5th of 18 (promoted via play-offs)
- Website: https://www.cflanucia.futbol/
Home colours	Away colours

Club de Fútbol La Nucía is a Spanish football team based in La Nucía, in the autonomous community of Valencia. Founded in 1995, it plays in Segunda Federación – Group 3, holding home games at Estadio Camilo Cano, which has a capacity of 3,000 spectators.

Team colours are red shirt, black shorts and socks.

== History ==
Club de Fútbol La Nucía rose from the ashes of several teams that were successively created in the city, receiving this denomination in 1995. In 1998–99, the club was promoted to the first regional division for the first time, returning again to that level five years later.

The 2006–07 season was full of unexpected events. After qualifying to the promotion playoffs for Tercera División, La Nucía was eliminated by CD Olímpic de Xàtiva (1–1 draw in the first leg and 0–1 loss in the second). During the summer, however, Club de Fútbol Dolores forfeited its berth in the competition, with La Nucía occupying its place, with a first-ever promotion to the national categories.

In its first season in the fourth division, La Nucía finished in third position in the regular season, thus qualifying for the promotion playoffs, being eliminated by UD Las Palmas Atlético (1–1 at home, 1–2 away loss). The team met the same fate in the following campaign, being ousted by RSD Alcalá in the third round (0–2 on aggregate).

On 30 June 2019, La Nucía achieved their first promotion ever to the third division after beating Linares in the last round of the promotion playoffs, with a goal in the 93rd minute. It was scored by San Julián, who achieved promotion for the club in the last game of his career.

== Season to season ==
Season	Tier	Division	Place	Copa del Rey
1995–96	7	2ª Reg.	4th	
1996–97	7	2ª Reg.	6th	
1997–98	7	2ª Reg.	2nd	
1998–99	6	1ª Reg.	5th	
1999–2000	6	1ª Reg.	7th	
2000–01	6	1ª Reg.	14th	
2001–02	7	2ª Reg.	7th	
2002–03	7	2ª Reg.	2nd	
2003–04	6	1ª Reg.	3rd	
2004–05	6	1ª Reg.	6th	
2005–06	6	1ª Reg.	1st	
2006–07	5	Reg. Pref.	1st	
2007–08	4	3ª	3rd	
2008–09	4	3ª	3rd	
2009–10	4	3ª	8th	
2010–11	4	3ª	4th	
2011–12	4	3ª	6th	
2012–13	4	3ª	5th	
2013–14	4	3ª	8th	
2014–15	4	3ª	19th	

Season	Tier	Division	Place	Copa del Rey
2015–16	5	Reg. Pref.	1st	
2016–17	5	Reg. Pref.	2nd	
2017–18	4	3ª	4th	
2018–19	4	3ª	2nd	
2019–20	3	2ª B	10th	First round
2020–21	3	2ª B	5th / 6th	Second round
2021–22	4	2ª RFEF	2nd	
2022–23	3	1ª Fed.	17th	Round of 32
2023–24	4	2ª Fed.	18th	
2024–25	5	3ª Fed.	3rd	
2025–26	5	3ª Fed.	5th	
2026–27	4	2ª Fed.		

- 1 season in Primera Federación
- 2 seasons in Segunda División B
- 3 seasons in Segunda Federación/Segunda División RFEF
- 10 seasons in Tercera División
- 2 season in Tercera Federación

== Players ==
=== Current squad ===
As of 8 February 2024.

Note: Flags indicate national team as defined under FIFA eligibility rules; some limited exceptions apply. Players may hold more than one non-FIFA nationality.

No.	Pos.	Nation	Player
1	GK	ESP	Rodrigo Gea
2	DF	ESP	Fernando Pajarero
3	DF	ESP	Jorge Valín
4	DF	IRL	Kevin Toner
5	MF	FRA	Thomas Dasquet
6	MF	ESP	Adrián León
8	FW	ESP	Eneko Delgado
9	FW	ESP	Mariano Sanz
10	FW	ESP	Rubén Sáiz
11	FW	ESP	Juan Delgado
12	MF	ESP	Agustín Murillo
14	MF	ESP	Alberto Rubio

No.	Pos.	Nation	Player
15	DF	ESP	Álex Salto
16	MF	ESP	Mario Robles
17	DF	ESP	Miguel Acosta
18	FW	ESP	Joan Monterde
19	DF	ESP	Víctor Savall
20	FW	ESP	Jaume Galiana
21	MF	ESP	David López
22	FW	ESP	Christian Martínez
23	MF	ESP	Francisco Caler
24	MF	ESP	Rodrigo Moleón
25	GK	ROU	Fernando Arcana

=== Reserve team ===
Note: Flags indicate national team as defined under FIFA eligibility rules; some limited exceptions apply. Players may hold more than one non-FIFA nationality.

No.	Pos.	Nation	Player
28	MF	ESP	Mario Espinosa

=== Out of loan ===
Note: Flags indicate national team as defined under FIFA eligibility rules; some limited exceptions apply. Players may hold more than one non-FIFA nationality.

No.	Pos.	Nation	Player

== Former Managers ==
- (Spain) Manuel Jiménez González (1986–87)
- (Spain) Pepe Soler (2009–11)
- (Spain) Miguel Ángel Martínez (2018–19)
- (Spain) César Ferrando (2018) (2019–23)
