= Mink Peeters =

Dutch footballer

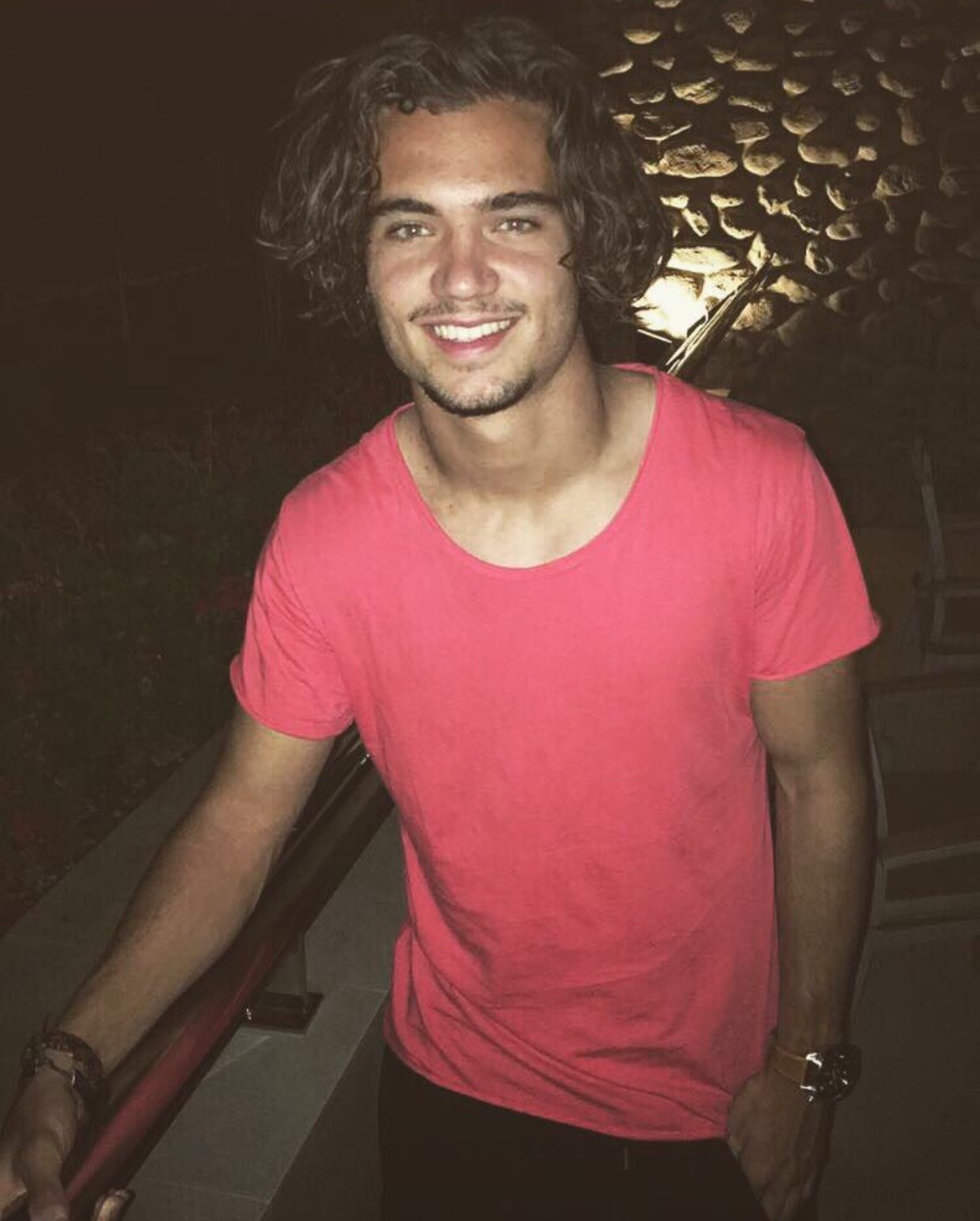
- Peeters in 2017

Personal information
- Full name: Mink Martin Peeters
- Date of birth: 28 May 1998 (age 28)
- Place of birth: Nijmegen, Netherlands
- Height: 1.82 m (6 ft 0 in)
- Position: Forward

Youth career
- 2007–2011: PSV
- 2011–2014: Ajax
- 2014–2017: Real Madrid

Senior career*
Years	Team	Apps	(Gls)
2017–2019	Real Madrid B	0	(0)
2017–2018	→ VVV-Venlo (loan)	0	(0)
2018	→ Almere City (loan)	3	(0)
2018	→ Lleida (loan)	2	(0)
2019–2020	Čukarički	0	(0)
2020–2021	FC Volendam II	4	(0)
2022–2023	Gulf United	19	(7)
2024–2025	SV Lafnitz	3	(0)
2025	Westchester SC	4	(0)
Total		35	(7)

International career
2013	Netherlands U15	3	(0)
2014	Netherlands U16	2	(0)
2014–2015	Netherlands U17	8	(0)
2015	Netherlands U18	5	(1)
2017	Netherlands U20	1	(0)
- * Club domestic league appearances and goals

Mink Martin Peeters (born 28 May 1998) is a Dutch former professional footballer who played as a forward.

== Club career ==
Born in Nijmegen, Peeters started his youth career with academy of PSV Eindhoven in 2007. Four years later, he switched to Ajax. As he progressed through the C1, B2 and B1 teams, he attracted the interest of foreign clubs including Atlético Madrid and Real Madrid. In 2014, he signed with Spanish club Real Madrid and was assigned to the youth team. While playing for the Juvenil A team (10 goals, 16 assists), he went on to win the 2017 Copa de Campeones with the side, besides reaching the semifinal of the UEFA Youth League. Subsequently, his contract was extended by three years at the end of the season.

On 19 August 2017, Peeters was loaned out to Dutch Eredivisie club VVV-Venlo for the remainder of the season. Because of contractual transfer issues, and physical problems (Pfeiffer's disease) his entrance at VVV-Venlo was anything but prosperous. On 21 September, he made his competitive debut, playing the whole 90 minutes of a KNVB Cup match against Blauw Geel '38. In November, he was suspended by manager Maurice Steijn for three days because he trained outside the club without its permission. Without having featured any further for VVV-Venlo, Peeters left the club at the end of January 2018.

Peeters joined second tier Eerste Divisie club Almere City on loan for the remainder of the season on 28 January 2018. Because of acute appendicitis he first was able to attend the training of his new club after two months. On 2 April, he made his debut in a 4–0 victory against RKC Waalwijk.

On 10 August 2018, he was loaned to Lleida for the 2018–19 season, but because of financial transfer issues he was not able to play for Lleida for a couple of months. He next returned to Real Madrid (Real Madrid Castilla, actually) in January 2019, but he rescinded his contract with Los Blancos, in consultation, because loan regulations prohibited him to play for Real Madrid Castilla anymore.

On 5 August 2019, Peeters signed a three-year contract with Serbian club FK Čukarički. He had arrived at Belgrade-based club immediately at the start of the preparations for new season, however, an injury delayed his signing and participation in the club's 2019–20 UEFA Europa League qualifiers. Peeters left FK Čukarički after five months without playing a game for them. Shortly after leaving Čukarički, Peeters signed a one-year contract with FC Volendam who were competing in the Eerste Divisie.

He then played with Gulf United FC from the United Arab Emirates, (19 games, 7 goals, 8 assists). On 15 February 2024, Peeters joined Austrian side SV Lafnitz. He would then join expansion club Westchester SC in 2025. He missed most of the 2025 season due to injury.

On 24 April 2026, Peeters would post a TikTok video announcing his retirement from professional football, just five months after leaving Westchester.

== International career ==
Peeters has been capped by the under-15, under-16, under-17, Netherlands U18 and under-20 teams. He represented the under-17 team in 2015 UEFA European Under-17 Championship.

== Career statistics ==
Appearances and goals by club, season and competition
Club	Season	League			Cup (Note: Includes KNVB Cup, Copa del Rey, Austrian Cup and U.S. Open Cup)		(Note: Includes USL Cup)Other		Total	
Club	Season	Division	Apps	Goals	Apps	Goals	Apps	Goals	Apps	Goals
VVV-Venlo (loan)	2017–18	Eredivisie	0	0	1	0	—		1	0
Almere City (loan)	2017–18	Eerste Divisie	3	0	0	0	—		3	0
Lleida (loan)	2018–19	Segunda División B	1	0	1	0	—		2	0
Jong Volendam	2019–20	Tweede Divisie	4	0	—		—		4	0
Gulf United	2022–23	UAE Division 2	19	7	0	0	—		19	7
Lafnitz	2023–24	Austrian Football Second League	1	0	0	0	—		1	0
Lafnitz	2024–25	Austrian Football Second League	2	0	1	0	—		3	0
Lafnitz	Total		3	0	1	0	0	0	4	0
Westchester	2025	USL League One	4	0	2	0	1	0	7	0
Career total			34	7	5	0	1	0	40	7
