= 2026–27 Segunda Federación =

Segunda Federación
- Season: 2026–27
- Dates: 5 September 2026 – June 2027

The 2026–27 Segunda Federación season will be the sixth for the Segunda Federación, the fourth highest level in the Spanish football league system. Ninety teams will participate, divided into five groups of eighteen clubs each based on geographical proximity. In each group, the champions automatically promoted to Primera Federación, and the second to fifth placers will play promotion play-offs. The last five teams in each group will be relegated to the Tercera Federación; in addition, the four worst teams classified 13th in their group will play play-offs to define the last two relegation places.

== Overview before the season ==
A total of 90 teams will join the league: ten relegated from the 2025–26 Primera Federación, 53 retained from the 2025–26 Segunda Federación and 27 promoted from the 2025–26 Tercera Federación. Groups were defined on 24 June 2026.

Teams relegated from 2025–26 Primera Federación

- Atlético Sanluqueño
- Betis Deportivo
- Guadalajara
- Marbella
- Osasuna B
- Ourense CF
- Sevilla Atlético
- Talavera de la Reina

Teams retained from 2025–26 Segunda Federación

- Alavés B
- Alcalá
- Alcoyano
- Amorebieta
- Atlético Antoniano
- Atlético Astorga
- Atlético Baleares
- Ávila
- Barbastro
- Barcelona Atlètic
- Basconia
- Bergantiños
- Castellón B (Note: Bought the place of Tarazona after the club suffered administrative relegation.)
- Conquense
- Coruxo
- Ebro
- Eibar B
- Elche Ilicitano
- Espanyol B
- Estepona
- Gernika
- Getafe B
- Gimnástica Segoviana
- Girona B
- Intercity
- Las Palmas Atlético
- Linares
- SD Logroñés
- Lorca Deportiva
- Marino Luanco
- Minera
- Navalcarnero
- Náxara
- Numancia
- Olot
- Orihuela
- Oviedo Vetusta
- Poblense
- Puente Genil (Note: Retained after La Unión Atlético/Malacitano was not allowed registration in the division.)
- Rayo Cantabria
- Real Madrid C (Note: Bought the place of Arenteiro after the club suffered administrative relegation.)
- Recreativo
- Reus FCR
- Salamanca
- San Sebastián de los Reyes
- Sestao River
- Tenerife B
- Terrassa
- Tudelano
- UCAM Murcia
- Utebo
- Valencia Mestalla
- Valladolid Promesas
- Xerez
- Yeclano

Teams promoted from 2025–26 Tercera Federación

- Arnedo
- Arosa
- Atlético Albacete
- Atlético Central
- Atlético Madrid C
- Atlético Paso
- Atlético Tordesillas
- Badajoz
- Calamocha
- Calvo Sotelo
- Castellonense
- Cieza
- Ciudad de Lucena
- Compostela
- Don Benito
- Gimnástica Torrelavega
- La Nucía
- Llanera
- UD Logroñés B
- Mallorca B
- Manresa
- Mijas-Las Lagunas
- Murcia Imperial
- Peña Deportiva
- Peña Sport
- Portugalete
- Tamaraceite

== Group 1 ==
Location of teams in 2026–27 Segunda Federación – Group 1
Location of teams in 2026–27 Segunda Federación – Group 1 (Basque Country)

Team	Home city	Autonomous Community	Stadium	Capacity
Alavés B	Vitoria	Basque Country	José Luis Compañón	2,500
Amorebieta	Amorebieta-Etxano	Basque Country	Urritxe	3,000
Arosa	Vilagarcía de Arousa	Galicia	A Lomba	5,000
Atlético Astorga	Astorga	Castile and León	La Eragudina	2,332
Basconia	Basauri	Basque Country	Artunduaga	5,000
Bergantiños	Carballo	Galicia	As Eiroas	5,000
Compostela	Santiago de Compostela	Galicia	Vero Boquete	16,666
Coruxo	Vigo	Galicia	O Vao	2,200
Eibar B	Eibar	Basque Country	Unbe	4,000
Gernika	Gernika-Lumo	Basque Country	Urbieta	3,000
Gimnástica Torrelavega	Torrelavega	Cantabria	El Malecón	6,007
Llanera	Llanera	Asturias	Pepe Quimarán	1,000
Marino Luanco	Luanco	Asturias	Miramar	3,500
Ourense CF	Ourense	Galicia	O Couto	5,659
Oviedo Vetusta	Oviedo	Asturias	El Requexón	3,000
Portugalete	Portugalete	Basque Country	La Florida	5,000
Rayo Cantabria	Santander	Cantabria	La Albericia	600
Sestao River	Sestao	Basque Country	Las Llanas	8,905

=== League table ===
Pos	Team	Pld	W	D	L	GF	GA	GD	Pts	Qualification
1	Sestao River	12	9	2	1	17	5	+12	29	Promotion to Primera Federación and qualification to Copa del Rey
2	Alavés B	12	7	3	2	25	15	+10	24	Qualification for the promotion play-offs
3	Eibar B	12	6	4	2	22	12	+10	22	Qualification for the promotion play-offs
4	Oviedo Vetusta	12	6	3	3	17	18	−1	21	Qualification for the promotion play-offs
5	Bergantiños	12	5	4	3	24	17	+7	19	Qualification for the promotion play-offs and Copa del Rey
6	Portugalete	12	5	4	3	19	14	+5	19	Qualification for the Copa del Rey
7	Compostela	12	5	3	4	14	11	+3	18	Qualification for the Copa del Rey
8	Basconia	12	4	5	3	16	16	0	17	
9	Amorebieta	12	5	2	5	14	14	0	17	Qualification for the Copa del Rey
10	Ourense CF	12	5	2	5	10	14	−4	17	
11	Gernika	12	3	6	3	19	12	+7	15	
12	Coruxo	12	4	3	5	13	14	−1	15	
13	Rayo Cantabria	12	4	2	6	16	21	−5	14	Qualification for the relegation play-offs
14	Llanera	12	4	1	7	19	27	−8	13	Relegation to Tercera Federación
15	Arosa	12	1	7	4	19	25	−6	10	Relegation to Tercera Federación
16	Gimnástica Torrelavega	12	2	3	7	9	21	−12	9	Relegation to Tercera Federación
17	Atlético Astorga	12	2	2	8	14	21	−7	8	Relegation to Tercera Federación
18	Marino Luanco	12	2	2	8	9	19	−10	8	Relegation to Tercera Federación

Updated to match(es) played on 22 November 2026. Source:
Rules for classification: 1) points; 2) head-to-head points; 3) head-to-head goal difference; 4) goal difference; 5) number of goals scored
(Note: Head-to-head record is used only after all the matches between the teams in question have been played)

=== Results ===
Home \ Away	ALA	AMO	ARO	AST	BAS	BER	COM	COR	EIB	GER	GIM	LLA	MAR	OUR	OVI	POR	RCA	SES
Alavés B	—						1–1	0–2	2–1	1–1					3–1		3–3	
Amorebieta		—	2–2					2–1	1–1		1–0			0–1		1–2		
Arosa	2–5		—			2–2	1–2		2–2	0–4		4–1						
Atlético Astorga		0–1	1–1	—						1–1			3–0	4–0		0–1		
Basconia	0–1	2–1	2–2	3–2	—							1–1				2–2		
Bergantiños		1–0			0–1	—		3–1						1–1	3–0	3–2		1–1
Compostela				4–1	0–0		—						0–3	0–1	1–2			2–0
Coruxo							0–1	—		1–1		3–1					1–1	0–2
Eibar B				4–1	1–1	3–2	1–0		—		1–0							
Gernika		1–2				2–2				—		4–0	0–0		1–2		3–1	1–2
Gimnástica Torrelavega	1–5					0–3				0–0	—	2–1	1–2			1–0		
Llanera	1–2					4–3	1–3					—	4–2	2–0			2–1	
Marino Luanco					1–2			0–1					—	0–2	0–0		0–1	0–1
Ourense CF			0–0		2–1			0–1	0–2		3–0			—		0–3		
Oviedo Vetusta				2–1				1–1	2–1		3–3	2–1			—		2–1	
Portugalete	0–2		3–3				0–0	2–1	0–0				4–1			—		
Rayo Cantabria		0–2		2–0	3–1				1–5		2–1						—	0–1
Sestao River	2–0	3–1	1–0	2–0							0–0				2–0			—

Updated to match(es) played on 22 November 2026. Source:
Legend: Blue = home team win; Yellow = draw; Red = away team win.

== Group 2 ==
Location of teams in 2026–27 Segunda Federación – Group 2

Team	Home city	Autonomous Community	Stadium	Capacity
Arnedo	Arnedo	La Rioja	Sendero	5,000
Barbastro	Barbastro	Aragon	Municipal de Deportes	5,000
Barcelona Atlètic	Barcelona	Catalonia	Johan Cruyff	6,000
Calamocha	Calamocha	Aragon	Jumaya	1,000
Ebro	Zaragoza	Aragon	El Carmen	400
Espanyol B	Barcelona	Catalonia	Dani Jarque	1,520
Girona B	Girona	Catalonia	Torres de Palau	1,000
SD Logroñés	Logroño	La Rioja	Las Gaunas	16,000
UD Logroñés B	Logroño	La Rioja	Ciudad Deportiva UD Logroñés	2,000
Manresa	Manresa	Catalonia	Nou Congost	5,000
Náxara	Nájera	La Rioja	La Salera	1,000
Olot	Olot	Catalonia	Municipal d'Olot	3,000
Osasuna B	Pamplona	Navarre	Tajonar	4,500
Peña Sport	Tafalla	Navarre	San Francisco	4,000
Reus FCR	Reus	Catalonia	Municipal de Reus	4,300
Terrassa	Terrassa	Catalonia	Olímpic	11,500
Tudelano	Tudela	Navarre	Ciudad de Tudela	11,000
Utebo	Utebo	Aragon	Santa Ana	5,000

=== League table ===
Pos	Team	Pld	W	D	L	GF	GA	GD	Pts	Qualification
1	Barcelona Atlètic	12	8	2	2	20	6	+14	26	Promotion to Primera Federación
2	Terrassa	12	7	3	2	13	6	+7	24	Qualification for the promotion play-offs and Copa del Rey
3	Girona B	12	7	2	3	22	12	+10	23	Qualification for the promotion play-offs
4	Espanyol B	11	6	4	1	22	8	+14	22	Qualification for the promotion play-offs
5	Olot	12	6	4	2	17	13	+4	22	Qualification for the promotion play-offs and Copa del Rey
6	Ebro	12	6	3	3	22	14	+8	21	Qualification for the Copa del Rey
7	Manresa	12	6	2	4	17	11	+6	20	Qualification for the Copa del Rey
8	Osasuna B	12	6	2	4	14	8	+6	20	
9	Reus FCR	12	5	2	5	12	14	−2	17	Qualification for the Copa del Rey
10	Utebo	12	3	6	3	13	12	+1	15	
11	Barbastro	12	2	7	3	13	14	−1	13	
12	Peña Sport	12	3	4	5	17	20	−3	13	
13	Tudelano	12	3	3	6	16	22	−6	12	Qualification for the relegation play-offs
14	SD Logroñés	12	2	5	5	11	17	−6	11	Relegation to Tercera Federación
15	UD Logroñés B	12	2	5	5	11	18	−7	11	Relegation to Tercera Federación
16	Náxara	11	1	4	6	6	18	−12	7	Relegation to Tercera Federación
17	Arnedo	12	1	4	7	11	27	−16	7	Relegation to Tercera Federación
18	Calamocha	12	1	2	9	5	22	−17	5	Relegation to Tercera Federación

Updated to match(es) played on 22 November 2026. Source:
Rules for classification: 1) points; 2) head-to-head points; 3) head-to-head goal difference; 4) goal difference; 5) number of goals scored
(Note: Head-to-head record is used only after all the matches between the teams in question have been played)

=== Results ===
Home \ Away	ARN	BRB	BAT	CAL	EBR	ESP	GIR	SDL	UDL	MAN	NAX	OLO	OSA	PSP	RED	TER	TUD	UTE
Arnedo	—			1–1	1–2					1–4	2–1					0–1	2–2	
Barbastro	2–2	—	0–1				4–3			0–0				1–2				1–1
Barcelona Atlètic	2–1		—				0–1	1–0			5–0			4–0				2–1
Calamocha				—			0–1		3–2					1–1	0–1	0–1	0–3	
Ebro				2–0	—		0–1	2–2							2–0	1–0		3–1
Espanyol B	5–0	2–2	0–0	5–0		—							1–0					
Girona B						1–2	—				3–0	4–0	3–2				3–1	
SD Logroñés				1–0		1–2	2–2	—			1–1	0–2				0–0		
UD Logroñés B		2–1	0–0			1–3			—			2–4		2–2				
Manresa			0–3		3–2				0–1	—			0–0	2–0				
Náxara		0–0								0–2	—	1–2		1–0				1–1
Olot			2–0		2–2	0–0				1–0		—				1–1		1–2
Osasuna B	4–1	0–1		2–0	1–0			2–0				0–0	—				2–0	
Peña Sport						2–1		4–0						—	1–1	2–3		1–1
Reus FCR						1–1			1–0	1–4	1–0		0–1		—			
Terrassa		0–0					1–0		3–0						2–1	—	1–0	
Tudelano		1–1	1–2		2–5				0–0	2–1					1–3		—	
Utebo	0–0							1–1	1–1				2–0		0–1			—

Updated to match(es) played on 21 November 2026. Source:
Legend: Blue = home team win; Yellow = draw; Red = away team win.

== Group 3 ==
Location of teams in 2026–27 Segunda Federación – Group 3

Team	Home city	Autonomous Community	Stadium	Capacity
Alcoyano	Alcoy	Valencian Community	El Collao	4,850
Atlético Baleares	Palma	Balearic Islands	Estadi Balear	6,000
Castellón B	Castellón	Valencian Community	Gaetà Huguet	5,000
Castellonense	Castelló	Valencian Community	Camp Municipal de L'Almenà	1,500
Cieza	Cieza	Murcia	La Arboleja	3,500
Elche Ilicitano	Elche	Valencian Community	José Díaz Iborra	1,500
Intercity	Alicante	Valencian Community	Antonio Solana	2,500
La Nucía	La Nucía	Valencian Community	Camilo Cano	3,000
Lorca Deportiva	Lorca	Murcia	Francisco Artés Carrasco	8,120
Mallorca B	Palma	Balearic Islands	Son Bibiloni	1,500
Minera	Llano del Beal	Murcia	Ángel Cedrán	2,000
Murcia Imperial	Murcia	Murcia	Campus de Espinardo	3,000
Orihuela	Orihuela	Valencian Community	Los Arcos	7,000
Peña Deportiva	Santa Eulària des Riu	Balearic Islands	Municipal de Santa Eulària	1,500
Poblense	Sa Pobla	Balearic Islands	Nou Camp	8,000
UCAM Murcia	Murcia	Murcia	La Condomina	6,000
Valencia Mestalla	Paterna	Valencian Community	Antonio Puchades	2,300
Yeclano	Yecla	Murcia	La Constitución	4,000

=== League table ===
Pos	Team	Pld	W	D	L	GF	GA	GD	Pts	Qualification
1	Minera	12	7	3	2	17	11	+6	24	Promotion to Primera Federación and qualification to Copa del Rey
2	UCAM Murcia	11	7	1	3	23	11	+12	22	Qualification for the promotion play-offs and Copa del Rey
3	Castellón B	11	7	0	4	23	12	+11	21	Qualification for the promotion play-offs
4	Cieza	11	5	3	3	17	9	+8	18	Qualification for the promotion play-offs and Copa del Rey
5	Castellonense	11	5	3	3	18	13	+5	18	Qualification for the promotion play-offs and Copa del Rey
6	La Nucía	11	5	2	4	17	16	+1	17	Qualification for the Copa del Rey
7	Alcoyano	11	5	2	4	16	15	+1	17	
8	Lorca Deportiva	11	4	4	3	15	12	+3	16	
9	Atlético Baleares	11	4	4	3	18	17	+1	16	
10	Poblense	12	5	1	6	10	14	−4	16	
11	Yeclano	11	3	5	3	10	10	0	14	
12	Orihuela	11	3	5	3	10	15	−5	14	
13	Intercity	11	3	4	4	15	18	−3	13	Qualification for the relegation play-offs
14	Mallorca B	11	3	3	5	12	16	−4	12	Relegation to Tercera Federación
15	Elche Ilicitano	12	3	3	6	15	25	−10	12	Relegation to Tercera Federación
16	Peña Deportiva	11	2	2	7	9	15	−6	8	Relegation to Tercera Federación
17	Valencia Mestalla	11	1	5	5	10	17	−7	8	Relegation to Tercera Federación
18	Murcia Imperial	10	2	2	6	9	18	−9	8	Relegation to Tercera Federación

Updated to match(es) played on 21 November 2026. Source:
Rules for classification: 1) points; 2) head-to-head points; 3) head-to-head goal difference; 4) goal difference; 5) number of goals scored
(Note: Head-to-head record is used only after all the matches between the teams in question have been played)

=== Results ===
Home \ Away	ALC	ATB	CAB	CSN	CIE	ELC	INT	LNU	LOR	MLL	MIN	MUR	ORI	PDE	POB	UCM	VAL	YEC
Alcoyano	—				1–1	1–2	4–1				2–0	1–1			2–0			
Atlético Baleares	2–0	—						1–2		2–2					2–1	1–4		
Castellón B	3–0		—				1–2	2–1	2–1		3–0			0–1				
Castellonense	3–4			—	1–0			2–2				3–0	0–0			2–1		
Cieza		1–1			—	1–0	3–1				0–1			1–1			2–0	
Elche Ilicitano		1–2	1–5			—					2–2			1–0		1–5	4–1	
Intercity		2–2		0–2		2–2	—								0–1			1–1
La Nucía							1–4	—	1–3	2–0		5–1			1–0		1–1	
Lorca Deportiva		2–2		1–0		1–1	0–0		—	2–1					2–0			
Mallorca B	0–1					4–0				—	0–0		0–2					2–1
Minera				3–2				2–0			—		2–2	1–0	2–0			2–0
Murcia Imperial									3–2	0–1	0–2	—	1–2			0–1		1–1
Orihuela			1–4		0–4				1–0				—			0–0	1–1	
Peña Deportiva		1–3										0–2	3–1	—		0–1		1–1
Poblense			2–1	1–1	1–0									1–0	—		1–0	
UCAM Murcia	2–0				2–4		1–2			5–1						—	1–0	
Valencia Mestalla			1–2	1–1					1–1	1–1				3–2			—	
Yeclano		1–0	2–0			1–0		0–1					0–0		2–2			—

Updated to match(es) played on 21 November 2026. Source:
Legend: Blue = home team win; Yellow = draw; Red = away team win.

== Group 4 ==
Location of teams in 2026–27 Segunda Federación – Group 4

Team	Home city	Autonomous Community	Stadium	Capacity
Atlético Antoniano	Lebrija	Andalusia	Municipal de Lebrija	3,500
Atlético Central	Seville	Andalusia	Centro Deportivo Vega de Triana	1,000
Atlético Sanluqueño	Sanlúcar de Barrameda	Andalusia	El Palmar	5,000
Badajoz	Badajoz	Extremadura	Nuevo Vivero	14,898
Betis Deportivo	Seville	Andalusia	Luis del Sol	1,300
Ciudad de Lucena	Lucena	Andalusia	Ciudad de Lucena	5,046
Don Benito	Don Benito	Extremadura	Vicente Sanz	5,000
Estepona	Estepona	Andalusia	Francisco Muñoz Pérez	3,800
Las Palmas Atlético	Las Palmas	Canary Islands	Anexo Gran Canaria	2,000
Linares	Linares	Andalusia	Linarejos	10,000
Marbella	Marbella	Andalusia	Municipal de Marbella	7,300
Mijas-Las Lagunas	Las Lagunas, Mijas	Andalusia	Juan Gambero Culebra	1,000
Puente Genil	Puente Genil	Andalusia	Manuel Polinario	2,000
Recreativo	Huelva	Andalusia	Nuevo Colombino	21,670
Sevilla Atlético	Seville	Andalusia	Jesús Navas	8,000
Tamaraceite	Las Palmas	Canary Islands	Juan Guedes	2,000
Tenerife B	Santa Cruz de Tenerife	Canary Islands	Centro Insular	1,000
Xerez	Jerez de la Frontera	Andalusia	Chapín	20,523

=== League table ===
Pos	Team	Pld	W	D	L	GF	GA	GD	Pts	Qualification
1	Recreativo	10	6	3	1	21	8	+13	21	Promotion to Primera Federación and qualification to Copa del Rey
2	Estepona	12	6	3	3	26	18	+8	21	Qualification for the promotion play-offs and Copa del Rey
3	Don Benito	11	6	2	3	19	15	+4	20	Qualification for the promotion play-offs and Copa del Rey
4	Badajoz	11	5	5	1	12	8	+4	20	Qualification for the promotion play-offs and Copa del Rey
5	Ciudad de Lucena	11	5	4	2	20	14	+6	19	Qualification for the promotion play-offs and Copa del Rey
6	Xerez	11	5	3	3	14	7	+7	18	
7	Betis Deportivo	10	5	3	2	13	7	+6	18	
8	Linares	11	4	5	2	15	14	+1	17	
9	Mijas-Las Lagunas	11	3	6	2	21	18	+3	15	
10	Puente Genil	11	4	3	4	13	10	+3	15	
11	Atlético Central	11	5	0	6	13	17	−4	15	
12	Sevilla Atlético	11	3	5	3	18	20	−2	14	
13	Marbella	11	3	4	4	9	11	−2	13	Qualification for the relegation play-offs
14	Tenerife B	11	4	1	6	14	17	−3	13	Relegation to Tercera Federación
15	Atlético Sanluqueño	11	2	4	5	15	19	−4	10	Relegation to Tercera Federación
16	Las Palmas Atlético	11	2	2	7	9	21	−12	8	Relegation to Tercera Federación
17	Atlético Antoniano	11	1	3	7	10	21	−11	6	Relegation to Tercera Federación
18	Tamaraceite	12	2	0	10	9	26	−17	6	Relegation to Tercera Federación

Updated to match(es) played on 21 November 2026. Source:
Rules for classification: 1) points; 2) head-to-head points; 3) head-to-head goal difference; 4) goal difference; 5) number of goals scored
(Note: Head-to-head record is used only after all the matches between the teams in question have been played)

=== Results ===
Home \ Away	ANT	CEN	ASL	BAD	BET	CLU	DBE	EST	LPA	LIN	MAR	MIJ	PNG	REC	SEV	TAM	TEN	XER
Atlético Antoniano	—					0–3	1–2	4–1				1–1			3–3			
Atlético Central	1–0	—								0–1				2–0	2–0	1–0		
Atlético Sanluqueño			—		0–1				4–1			2–2		3–3		1–0		0–4
Badajoz			1–0	—	0–1		2–1			1–1	1–0						2–1	
Betis Deportivo	0–0				—					4–0				0–2				1–1
Ciudad de Lucena			2–1	1–1		—	4–2						1–0				1–2	
Don Benito		4–2	1–0				—		3–0	1–1			3–2					
Estepona		3–2				2–2	3–1	—		1–4					4–0	5–0		0–0
Las Palmas Atlético		0–1		0–0	0–1	4–3			—				1–2				1–1	
Linares	2–1					1–1			0–1	—				0–0	3–3			
Marbella		4–1	2–2		0–2			0–0	2–1		—	0–0						
Mijas-Las Lagunas					1–1	1–1		3–4				—			3–1	6–2		
Puente Genil		2–0		0–0				0–2			0–0	4–0	—			1–0		
Recreativo	5–0								4–0			1–1	2–1	—				1–0
Sevilla Atlético			2–2	2–2							3–0		1–1		—		2–0	
Tamaraceite	1–0				3–2						0–1			1–3	0–1	—		1–3
Tenerife B		3–1					0–1	2–1		1–2		1–3				2–1	—	
Xerez	2–0			1–2		0–1	0–0				1–0						2–1	—

Updated to match(es) played on 21 November 2026. Source:
Legend: Blue = home team win; Yellow = draw; Red = away team win.

== Group 5 ==
Location of teams in 2026–27 Segunda Federación – Group 5
Location of teams in 2026–27 Segunda Federación – Group 5 (Community of Madrid)

Team	Home city	Autonomous Community	Stadium	Capacity
Alcalá	Alcalá de Henares	Madrid	Municipal del Val	7,000
Atlético Albacete	Albacete	Castilla–La Mancha	Ciudad Deportiva Andrés Iniesta	3,000
Atlético Madrid C	Majadahonda	Madrid	Cerro del Espino	3,500
Atlético Paso	El Paso	Canary Islands	Municipal El Paso	5,000
Atlético Tordesillas	Tordesillas	Castile and León	Las Salinas	3,500
Ávila	Ávila	Castile and León	Adolfo Suárez	6,000
Calvo Sotelo	Puertollano	Castilla–La Mancha	Ciudad de Puertollano	7,240
Conquense	Cuenca	Castilla–La Mancha	La Fuensanta	6,000
Getafe B	Getafe	Madrid	Ciudad Deportiva	1,500
Gimnástica Segoviana	Segovia	Castile and León	La Albuera	6,000
Guadalajara	Guadalajara	Castilla–La Mancha	Pedro Escartín	8,000
Navalcarnero	Navalcarnero	Madrid	Mariano González	2,500
Numancia	Soria	Castile and León	Los Pajaritos	8,261
Real Madrid C	Madrid	Madrid	Ciudad Real Madrid	3,000
Salamanca	Salamanca	Castile and León	Helmántico	17,341
San Sebastián de los Reyes	San Sebastián de los Reyes	Madrid	Matapiñonera	3,000
Talavera de la Reina	Talavera de la Reina	Castilla–La Mancha	El Prado	5,000
Valladolid Promesas	Valladolid	Castile and León	Anexos José Zorrilla	1,500

=== League table ===
Pos	Team	Pld	W	D	L	GF	GA	GD	Pts	Qualification
1	Numancia	12	6	5	1	19	7	+12	23	Promotion to Primera Federación and qualification to Copa del Rey
2	Conquense	10	6	3	1	23	12	+11	21	Qualification for the promotion play-offs and Copa del Rey
3	Atlético Madrid C	11	6	3	2	20	14	+6	21	Qualification for the promotion play-offs
4	Salamanca	11	6	2	3	16	11	+5	20	Qualification for the promotion play-offs and Copa del Rey
5	San Sebastián de los Reyes	11	6	2	3	15	11	+4	20	Qualification for the promotion play-offs and Copa del Rey
6	Valladolid Promesas	11	5	3	3	23	17	+6	18	
7	Navalcarnero	11	4	5	2	19	16	+3	17	Qualification for the Copa del Rey
8	Talavera de la Reina	10	4	3	3	12	12	0	15	
9	Atlético Tordesillas	11	3	4	4	19	18	+1	13	
10	Gimnástica Segoviana	11	3	4	4	15	15	0	13	
11	Guadalajara	11	3	4	4	21	23	−2	13	
12	Atlético Albacete	11	3	4	4	13	24	−11	13	
13	Real Madrid C	12	2	6	4	6	8	−2	12	Qualification for the relegation play-offs
14	Atlético Paso	11	2	4	5	13	16	−3	10	Relegation to Tercera Federación
15	Alcalá	11	2	4	5	16	20	−4	10	Relegation to Tercera Federación
16	Getafe B	11	1	6	4	14	18	−4	9	Relegation to Tercera Federación
17	Calvo Sotelo	11	2	3	6	10	21	−11	9	Relegation to Tercera Federación
18	Ávila	11	2	1	8	8	19	−11	7	Relegation to Tercera Federación

Updated to match(es) played on 21 November 2026. Source:
Rules for classification: 1) points; 2) head-to-head points; 3) head-to-head goal difference; 4) goal difference; 5) number of goals scored
(Note: Head-to-head record is used only after all the matches between the teams in question have been played)

=== Results ===
Home \ Away	ALC	ALB	ATM	ATP	TOR	AVI	CSO	CON	GET	GSE	GUA	NAV	NUM	RMC	SAL	SSR	TAL	VAL
Alcalá	—		2–5							5–2		1–3		0–0		1–2	3–0	
Atlético Albacete		—	2–1	2–2	4–3					1–0							0–4	
Atlético Madrid C			—		3–3	2–1		3–2		1–1				2–0			1–0	
Atlético Paso	1–1		0–1	—		3–0							0–2	1–0				
Atlético Tordesillas				3–2	—						3–0	2–2	1–2		2–0	1–3		
Ávila						—	2–1		1–0				1–1	0–1	1–3			
Calvo Sotelo	0–0			0–0	1–0		—			0–3	1–2						4–1	
Conquense	2–2	4–0		2–2				—	2–2		3–1				1–0			
Getafe B		2–2					2–2		—				0–0			2–0	1–1	
Gimnástica Segoviana					1–1	1–0		1–2		—						2–0		1–1
Guadalajara	2–1								4–1	3–3	—	2–2			2–3			4–4
Navalcarnero			1–1	3–1		2–1		1–3	1–1			—						
Numancia			2–0				6–0				1–0	2–3	—				0–0	
Real Madrid C		0–0			0–0			0–2			1–1		1–2	—				3–0
Salamanca	3–0	0–0							1–0	1–0		1–1			—	3–2		
San Sebastián de los Reyes		2–1				3–0	2–1						0–0	0–0		—		1–0
Talavera de la Reina				2–1										0–0	2–1		—	2–1
Valladolid Promesas		6–1				2–1	3–0		4–3			1–0	1–1					—

Updated to match(es) played on 21 November 2026. Source:
Legend: Blue = home team win; Yellow = draw; Red = away team win.

== Ranking of 13th-place teams ==
Pos	Grp	Team	Pld	W	D	L	GF	GA	GD	Pts	Qualification or relegation
1	1	Rayo Cantabria	12	4	2	6	16	21	−5	14	
2	4	Marbella	11	3	4	4	9	11	−2	13	Qualification for the relegation play-offs
3	3	Intercity	11	3	4	4	15	18	−3	13	Qualification for the relegation play-offs
4	5	Real Madrid C	12	2	6	4	6	8	−2	12	Qualification for the relegation play-offs
5	2	UD Logroñés B	11	2	4	5	11	18	−7	10	Qualification for the relegation play-offs

Updated to match(es) played on 22 November 2026. Source:
Rules for classification: 1) points; 2) goal difference; 3) number of goals scored

== See also ==
- 2026–27 La Liga
- 2026–27 Segunda División
- 2026–27 Primera Federación
- 2026–27 Tercera Federación
