= CD Ciudad de Lucena =

Association football club in Spain

Ciudad de Lucena
- Full name: Club Deportivo Ciudad de Lucena
- Founded: 2008
- Ground: Ciudad de Lucena; Lucena, Spain
- Capacity: 5,000
- Chairman: Jorge Torres
- Manager: Dimas Carrasco
- League: Segunda Federación – Group 4
- 2025–26: Tercera Federación – Group 10, 1st of 18 (champions)
Home colours	Away colours

Club Deportivo Ciudad de Lucena is a Spanish football team based in Lucena, Córdoba, in the autonomous community of Andalusia. Founded in 2008, it plays in Segunda Federación – Group 4, holding their home matches at Estadio Ciudad de Lucena, which can hold 5.000 people.

== Season to season ==
Season	Tier	Division	Place	Copa del Rey
2008–09	7	1ª Prov.	3rd	
2009–10	6	Reg. Pref.	7th	
2010–11	6	Reg. Pref.	7th	
2011–12	6	Reg. Pref.	13th	
2012–13	6	Reg. Pref.	1st	
2013–14	5	1ª And.	13th	
2014–15	5	1ª And.	14th	
2015–16	5	1ª And.	6th	
2016–17	5	Div. Hon.	4th	
2017–18	4	3ª	10th	
2018–19	4	3ª	9th	
2019–20	4	3ª	2nd	
2020–21	4	3ª	2nd / 3rd	
2021–22	5	3ª RFEF	4th	
2022–23	5	3ª Fed.	6th	
2023–24	5	3ª Fed.	2nd	
2024–25	5	3ª Fed.	2nd	First round
2025–26	5	3ª Fed.	1st	First round
2026–27	4	2ª Fed.		TBD

- 1 season in Segunda Federación
- 4 seasons in Tercera División
- 5 seasons in Tercera Federación/Tercera División RFEF
