= David García (footballer, born 1982) =

Spanish footballer

Personal information
- Full name: David García Santana
- Date of birth: 25 February 1982 (age 44)
- Place of birth: Maspalomas, Spain
- Height: 1.82 m (6 ft 0 in)
- Position: Centre-back

Team information
- Current team: Tamaraceite

Youth career
- Maspalomas

Senior career*
Years	Team	Apps	(Gls)
2001–2003	Vecindario	65	(2)
2003–2019	Las Palmas	439	(16)
2019–2021	Tamaraceite	44	(3)
2021–2022	Arucas	27	(3)
2022–	Tamaraceite	105	(6)
- * Club domestic league appearances and goals as of 21:12, 6 October 2026 (UTC)

David García Santana (born 25 February 1982) is a Spanish footballer who plays as a central defender for Tercera Federación club UD Tamaraceite.

He spent his entire professional career with Las Palmas, appearing in 474 competitive games.

== Club career ==
García was born in Maspalomas, Gran Canaria. After finishing his youth career with CD Maspalomas, he made his debut as a senior with UD Vecindario in 2001, in Segunda División B.

In the summer of 2003, García joined Segunda División club UD Las Palmas. He made his professional debut on 17 September, starting in a 2–1 away win against Elche CF. He appeared in only seven matches during the season, as his team suffered relegation.

García scored his first professional goal on 10 December 2006, the last in a 1–1 draw at Albacete Balompié. He was an undisputed starter for the side the following seasons, being also named captain in 2008.

García played 37 matches in the 2014–15 campaign, helping Las Palmas get promoted to La Liga after a 13-year absence. He made his debut in the competition at the age of 33, starting in a 0–2 home loss to SD Eibar on 3 October 2015.

On 5 March 2016, García scored his first goal of the season to help his team to their third consecutive win, heading home from an assist by Jonathan Viera for the game's only goal at Villarreal CF. He left the Estadio Gran Canaria at the end of 2018–19, with the club back in the second tier.

García subsequently continued his career in the lower leagues while remaining in his native region, retiring in his 40s.

== Career statistics ==
As of match played 9 May 2021

Appearances and goals by club, season and competition
Club	Season	League			National Cup		Other		Total	
Club	Season	Division	Apps	Goals	Apps	Goals	Apps	Goals	Apps	Goals
Vecindario	2001–02	Segunda División B	31	2	3	0	—		34	2
Las Palmas	2003–04	Segunda División	7	0	0	0	—		7	0
Las Palmas	2004–05	Segunda División B	32	1	1	0	—		33	1
Las Palmas	2005–06	Segunda División B	33	2	3	0	4 (Note: Appearances in promotion playoffs)	0	40	2
Las Palmas	2006–07	Segunda División	35	2	2	0	—		37	2
Las Palmas	2007–08	Segunda División	40	0	3	0	—		43	0
Las Palmas	2008–09	Segunda División	36	2	0	0	—		36	2
Las Palmas	2009–10	Segunda División	39	0	2	0	—		41	0
Las Palmas	2010–11	Segunda División	35	0	0	0	—		35	0
Las Palmas	2011–12	Segunda División	17	3	0	0	—		17	3
Las Palmas	2012–13	Segunda División	27	1	4	0	2	0	33	1
Las Palmas	2013–14	Segunda División	31	0	2	0	0	0	33	0
Las Palmas	2014–15	Segunda División	33	0	0	0	4	0	37	0
Las Palmas	2015–16	La Liga	19	2	4	1	—		23	3
Las Palmas	2016–17	La Liga	22	1	3	0	—		25	1
Las Palmas	2017–18	La Liga	11	1	1	0	—		12	1
Las Palmas	2018–19	Segunda División	22	1	0	0	—		22	1
Las Palmas	Total		439	16	25	1	10	0	474	17
Tamaraceite	2019–20	Tercera División	20	2	2	0	—		22	2
Tamaraceite	2020–21	Segunda División B	24	1	0	0	—		24	1
Tamaraceite	Total		44	3	2	0	0	0	46	3
Career total			514	21	30	1	10	0	554	22
