= Albertito =

Spanish footballer

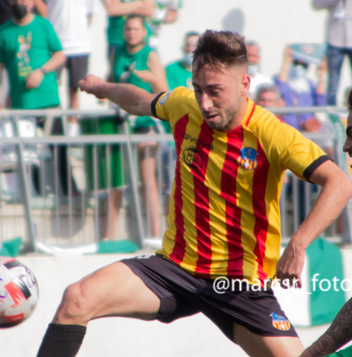
- Albertito playing for Sant Andreu in 2021

Personal information
- Full name: Alberto García Nieto
- Date of birth: 11 September 1998 (age 28)
- Place of birth: Barcelona, Spain
- Height: 1.76 m (5 ft 9 in)
- Position: Midfielder

Team information
- Current team: Sant Andreu
- Number: 8

Youth career
- Espanyol
- Damm
- Sant Gabriel
- Sant Andreu
- 2016–2017: Málaga

Senior career*
Years	Team	Apps	(Gls)
2016	Sant Andreu	4	(2)
2017–2018	Málaga B	0	(0)
2017–2018	→ Sant Andreu (loan)	26	(3)
2018–2020	Pobla Mafumet	55	(3)
2020–	Sant Andreu	158	(22)

International career^{‡}
2025–	Catalonia	1	(0)
- * Club domestic league appearances and goals as of 14 May 2026 ‡ National team caps and goals as of 18 November 2025

Alberto García Nieto (born 11 September 1998), known as Albertito or Tito, is a Spanish professional footballer who plays as a midfielder for UE Sant Andreu, which he captains.

== Club career ==
Born in Barcelona, Catalonia, Albertito played for RCD Espanyol, CF Damm, CE Sant Gabriel and UE Sant Andreu as a youth. He made his first team debut with the latter in 2016, in Tercera División, scoring twice in four matches.

On 11 July 2016, Albertito signed for Málaga CF and returned to youth football. On 31 August 2017, after playing for the Juvenil team, he returned to his previous club on loan for one year.

On 12 July 2018, Albertito agreed to a deal with Gimnàstic de Tarragona, being assigned to farm team CF Pobla de Mafumet also in the fourth division. On 21 September 2020, after two seasons as a regular starter, he returned to the Quadribarrats, and renewed his contract for another season the following 13 July.

On 30 May 2022, Albertito signed a new one-year deal with Sant Andreu, and extended his link for a further year on 20 June 2023. He was named team captain on 26 August, and agreed to a one-year extension on 27 May 2024.

== International career ==
On 13 November 2025, Albertito was called up to the Catalonia national team for a friendly against Palestine. He made his international debut five days later, playing the entire second half in the 2–1 win at the Estadi Olímpic Lluís Companys.
