= UD Castellonense =

Spanish football club

Castellonense
- Full name: Unión Deportiva Castellonense
- Founded: 1946
- Ground: Antonio Escuriet, Castelló, Valencian Community, Spain
- Capacity: 1,500
- President: Miguel Ángel Pla
- Manager: Iñaki Rodríguez
- League: Segunda Federación – Group 3
- 2025–26: Tercera Federación – Group 6, 1st of 18 (champions)
Home colours	Away colours

Unión Deportiva Castellonense is a football team based in Castelló in the autonomous community of Valencian Community. Founded in 1946, the team plays in Segunda Federación – Group 3. The club's home ground is Camp Poliesportiu Municipal Antonio Escuriet, which has a capacity of 1,500 spectators.

== History ==
Founded in 1946, Castellonense reached Tercera División after ten years of existence, and played for two seasons in the division. The club subsequently played in the regional leagues before achieving promotion to Tercera Federación in June 2023, 65 years after their last participation in a national competition.

== Season to season ==
Season	Tier	Division	Place	Copa del Rey
1948–49	5	2ª Reg.	3rd	
1949–50	DNP			
1950–51	DNP			
1951–52	5	2ª Reg.	9th	
1952–53	6	3ª Reg.		
1953–54	DNP			
1954–55	5	2ª Reg.	1st	
1955–56	4	1ª Reg.	7th	
1956–57	3	3ª	14th	
1957–58	3	3ª	18th	
1958–59	4	1ª Reg.	7th	
1959–60	4	1ª Reg.	12th	
1960–61	4	1ª Reg.	7th	
1961–62	4	1ª Reg.	10th	
1962–63	4	1ª Reg.	10th	
1963–64	4	1ª Reg.	12th	
1964–65	4	1ª Reg.	19th	
1965–66	4	1ª Reg.	12th	
1966–67	4	1ª Reg.	12th	
1967–68	4	1ª Reg.	6th	

Season	Tier	Division	Place	Copa del Rey
1968–69	4	1ª Reg.	17th	
1969–70	4	1ª Reg.	11th	
1970–71	4	Reg. Pref.	14th	
1971–72	4	Reg. Pref.	16th	
1972–73	5	1ª Reg.	2nd	
1973–74	4	Reg. Pref.	15th	
1974–75	5	1ª Reg.	7th	
1975–76	5	1ª Reg.	18th	
1976–77	5	1ª Reg.	17th	
1977–78	6	1ª Reg.	20th	
1978–79	7	2ª Reg.	4th	
1979–80	7	2ª Reg.	1st	
1980–81	6	1ª Reg.	4th	
1981–82	6	1ª Reg.	4th	
1982–83	6	1ª Reg.	13th	
1983–84	6	1ª Reg.	13th	
1984–85	6	1ª Reg.	11th	
1985–86	6	1ª Reg.	21st	
1986–87	7	2ª Reg.	11th	
1987–88	7	2ª Reg.	1st	

Season	Tier	Division	Place	Copa del Rey
1988–89	6	1ª Reg.	12th	
1989–90	6	1ª Reg.	16th	
1990–91	6	1ª Reg.	20th	
1991–92	7	2ª Reg.	1st	
1992–93	6	1ª Reg.	2nd	
1993–94	5	Reg. Pref.	7th	
1994–95	5	Reg. Pref.	19th	
1995–96	6	1ª Reg.	15th	
1996–97	6	1ª Reg.	16th	
1997–98	6	1ª Reg.	7th	
1998–99	6	1ª Reg.	2nd	
1999–2000	5	Reg. Pref.	16th	
2000–01	6	1ª Reg.	14th	
2001–02	7	2ª Reg.	1st	
2002–03	6	1ª Reg.	10th	
2003–04	6	1ª Reg.	16th	
2004–05	7	2ª Reg.	5th	
2005–06	7	2ª Reg.	6th	
2006–07	7	2ª Reg.	1st	
2007–08	6	1ª Reg.	12th	

Season	Tier	Division	Place	Copa del Rey
2008–09	6	1ª Reg.	12th	
2009–10	6	1ª Reg.	2nd	
2010–11	5	Reg. Pref.	9th	
2011–12	5	Reg. Pref.	3rd	
2012–13	5	Reg. Pref.	9th	
2013–14	5	Reg. Pref.	18th	
2014–15	6	1ª Reg.	4th	
2015–16	6	1ª Reg.	1st	
2016–17	5	Reg. Pref.	7th	
2017–18	5	Reg. Pref.	2nd	
2018–19	5	Reg. Pref.	2nd	
2019–20	5	Reg. Pref.	1st	
2020–21	5	Reg. Pref.	1st	
2021–22	6	Reg. Pref.	2nd	
2022–23	6	Reg. Pref.	3rd	
2023–24	5	3ª Fed.	11th	
2024–25	5	3ª Fed.	4th	
2025–26	5	3ª Fed.	1st	
2026–27	4	2ª Fed.		TBD

- 1 season in Segunda Federación
- 2 seasons in Tercera División
- 3 seasons in Tercera Federación
