= Segunda Federación =

Spanish association football league

- Organising body: RFEF
- Founded: 6 May 2020; 6 years ago
- First season: 2021–22
- Country: Spain
- Divisions: 5
- Number of clubs: 5 groups of 18 teams each (90)
- Level on pyramid: 4
- Promotion to: Primera Federación
- Relegation to: Tercera Federación
- Domestic cup(s): Copa del Rey; Copa Federación
- Broadcasters: Footters, TVG2, ETB 4, 7RM, IB3, CMM, Aragón TV, PTV Córdoba
- Website: rfef.es/segunda-federacion
- Current: 2026–27 Segunda Federación

Segunda Federación, previously called Segunda RFEF, also officially known as Segunda B, is the fourth tier of the Spanish football league system containing 90 teams divided into five groups. It is administered by the Royal Spanish Football Federation. It is the second tier outside the top two professional leagues, the Primera División (also known as La Liga) and Segunda División (also known as La Liga 2), being behind Primera Federación and above Tercera Federación. The division also includes the reserve teams of a number of La Liga and La Liga 2 teams.

== History ==
On 6 May 2020, the RFEF announced the creation of a new, two-group, 40-team third division called Primera División RFEF, which resulted in the former third division, Segunda División B, dropping down a level and becoming Segunda División RFEF; the changes were made effective for the 2021–22 campaign.

In July 2022, the division was renamed Segunda Federación.

== Current format ==
Segunda Federación features 90 teams divided into 5 groups of 18. The champions of each group achieve automatic promotion to Primera Federación, while the other top four teams qualify for a play-off round, where five of the 20 teams qualified also achieve promotion. However reserve teams are only eligible for promotion to the Primera Federación if their senior team is in one division above it. The bottom five teams in each group are relegated to the Tercera Federación. Also, the four worst 13th-placed teams enter into relegation play-offs to determine the two teams to be relegated.

== Eligibility of players ==
Each team of Segunda Federación can have 22 players in their squad, with these two limitations:

- A maximum of 16 players over 23 years old.
- A minimum of 10 players under professional contract.

== Groups ==
Locations of teams in 2026–27 Segunda Federación
Group 1; Group 2; Group 3; Group 4; Group 5

The member clubs of the Segunda Federación for the 2026–27 season are listed below.

Group 1	Group 2	Group 3	Group 4	Group 5
Alavés B; Amorebieta; Arosa; Atlético Astorga; Basconia; Bergantiños; Compostela; Coruxo; Eibar B; Gernika; Gimnástica Torrelavega; Llanera; Marino Luanco; Ourense CF; Oviedo Vetusta; Portugalete; Rayo Cantabria; Sestao River	Arnedo; Barbastro; Barcelona Atlètic; Calamocha; Ebro; Espanyol B; Girona B; SD Logroñés; UD Logroñés B; Manresa; Náxara; Olot; Osasuna B; Peña Sport; Reus FCR; Terrassa; Tudelano; Utebo	Alcoyano; Atlético Baleares; Castellonense; Castellón B; Cieza; Elche Ilicitano; Intercity; La Nucía; Lorca Deportiva; Mallorca B; Minera; Murcia Imperial; Orihuela; Peña Deportiva; Poblense; UCAM Murcia; Valencia Mestalla; Yeclano	Atlético Antoniano; Atlético Central; Atlético Paso; Atlético Sanluqueño; Badajoz; Betis Deportivo; Ciudad de Lucena; Don Benito; Estepona; Las Palmas Atlético; Linares; Marbella; Mijas-Las Lagunas; Recreativo; Sevilla Atlético; Tamaraceite; Tenerife B; Xerez	Alcalá; Atlético Albacete; Atlético Madrid C; Atlético Tordesillas; Ávila; Calvo Sotelo; Conquense; Getafe B; Gimnástica Segoviana; Guadalajara; Navalcarnero; Numancia; Real Madrid C; Salamanca; San Sebastián de los Reyes; Talavera de la Reina; Valladolid Promesas

== Winners and promotions ==
Season	Group winners					Other promoted teams
Season	Group 1	Group 2	Group 3	Group 4	Group 5	Other promoted teams
2021–22	Pontevedra	Osasuna B	Numancia	Córdoba	Intercity	Ceuta, Eldense, La Nucía, Mérida, Murcia
2022–23	Arenteiro	Sestao River	Teruel	Antequera	Melilla	Atlético Madrid B, Atlético Sanluqueño, Recreativo Granada, Recreativo Huelva, Tarazona
2023–24	Ourense	Bilbao Athletic	Hércules	Sevilla Atlético	Gimnástica Segoviana	Barakaldo, Betis Deportivo, Marbella, Yeclano, Zamora
2024–25	Pontevedra	Arenas	Europa	Juventud Torremolinos	Guadalajara	Avilés, Cacereño, Sabadell, Talavera de la Reina, Teruel
2025–26	Deportivo Fabril	Real Unión	Sant Andreu	Extremadura	Rayo Majadahonda	Águilas, Coria, Jaén, UD Logroñés, UD Ourense

== Top scorers ==
Goals in playoffs are not counted.

Season	Top scorer	Club	Goals
2021–22	(Brazil) Charles	Pontevedra	19
2022–23	(Spain) Carlos Martín	Atlético Madrid B	18
2023–24	(Spain) Urko Izeta	Bilbao Athletic	22
2024–25	(Spain) Alfredo Sualdea	Utebo	18
2025–26	(Spain) Iñigo Alayeto	Tudelano	21

== See also ==
- Spanish football league system
