= CP Mijas-Las Lagunas =

Association football club in Spain

Mijas-Las Lagunas
- Full name: Club Polideportivo Mijas-Las Lagunas
- Founded: 1991 (as AD Las Lagunas)
- Ground: Juan Gambero Culebra, Las Lagunas, Mijas, Málaga, Andalusia, Spain
- Capacity: 2,000
- President: José Manuel Quero
- Manager: José Fiera
- League: Segunda Federación – Group 4
- 2025–26: Tercera Federación – Group 9, 1st of 18 (champions)
- Website: https://clubpolideportivomijas.es/
Home colours	Away colours

Club Polideportivo Mijas-Las Lagunas is a Spanish football team based in Las Lagunas, Mijas, Málaga, in the autonomous community of Andalusia. Founded in 1991 as Associación Deportiva Las Lagunas, they currently play in Segunda Federación – Group 4, holding home matches at Campo Municipal Juan Gambero Culebra, with a capacity of 2,000 spectators.

== Season to season ==
=== AD Las Lagunas ===
Season	Tier	Division	Place	Copa del Rey
1994–95	6	1ª Reg.		
1995–96	6	1ª Reg.		
1996–97	6	1ª Reg.		
1997–98	6	1ª Reg.	1st	
1998–99	5	Reg. Pref.	14th	
1999–2000	5	Reg. Pref.	9th	
2000–01	5	Reg. Pref.	5th	
2001–02	5	Reg. Pref.	8th	
2002–03	5	Reg. Pref.	15th	
2003–04	6	1ª Reg.	3rd	
2004–05	6	Reg. Pref.	9th	

Season	Tier	Division	Place	Copa del Rey
2005–06	6	Reg. Pref.	3rd	
2006–07	6	Reg. Pref.	5th	
2007–08	6	Reg. Pref.	13th	
2008–09	6	Reg. Pref.	12th	
2009–10	6	Reg. Pref.	7th	
2010–11	6	Reg. Pref.	14th	
2011–12	6	Reg. Pref.	11th	
2012–13	6	Reg. Pref.	10th	
2013–14	6	Reg. Pref.	13th	
2014–15	6	2ª And.	16th	
2015–16	7	3ª And.	1st	

=== CP Mijas-Las Lagunas ===
Season	Tier	Division	Place	Copa del Rey
2016–17	7	2ª And.	7th	
2017–18	7	2ª And.	6th	
2018–19	6	1ª And.	7th	
2019–20	6	1ª And.	2nd	
2020–21	6	1ª And.	6th	
2021–22	7	1ª And.	6th	
2022–23	6	Div. Hon.	3rd	
2023–24	6	Div. Hon.	1st	Preliminary
2024–25	5	3ª Fed.	7th	
2025–26	5	3ª Fed.	1st	
2026–27	4	2ª Fed.		First round

- 1 season in Segunda Federación
- 2 seasons in Tercera Federación
