= UD Tamaraceite =

Spanish football club

Tamaraceite
- Full name: Unión Deportiva Tamaraceite
- Nickname: El Támara
- Founded: 1966; 60 years ago
- Ground: Juan Guedes, Las Palmas, Canary Islands, Spain
- Capacity: 2,000
- President: (Spain) Héctor Ramírez
- Head coach: (Spain) Chus Trujillo
- League: Segunda Federación – Group 4
- 2025–26: Tercera Federación – Group 12, 4th of 18 (promoted via play-offs)
Home colours	Away colours

Unión Deportiva Tamaraceite is a Spanish football team based in Las Palmas, in the autonomous community of Canary Islands. Founded in 1966, it plays in Segunda Federación – Group 4, holding home matches at Campo de Fútbol Juan Guedes, with a capacity of 2,000 seats.

== History ==
In the 2017–18 season the club won the Regional Preferente Canarias Division, Group 1 and promoted to the Tercera División.

== Season to season ==
Season	Tier	Division	Place	Copa del Rey
1966–67	6	3ª Reg.	4th	
1967–68	6	3ª Reg.	2nd	
1968–69	5	2ª Reg.	5th	
1969–70	5	2ª Reg.	10th	
1970–71	5	2ª Reg.	6th	
1971–72	5	2ª Reg.	10th	
1972–73	5	2ª Reg.	4th	
1973–74	5	2ª Reg.	8th	
1974–75	5	2ª Reg.	8th	
1975–76	5	2ª Reg.	3rd	
1976–77	5	2ª Reg.	4th	
1977–78	6	1ª Reg.	11th	
1978–79	7	2ª Reg.	1st	
1979–80	6	1ª Reg.	2nd	
1980–81	5	Reg. Pref.	1st	
1981–82	4	3ª	16th	
1982–83	4	3ª	15th	
1983–84	4	3ª	19th	
1984–85	5	Reg. Pref.	11th	
1985–86	DNP			

Season	Tier	Division	Place	Copa del Rey
1986–87	DNP			
1987–88	7	2ª Reg.	2nd	
1988–89	6	1ª Reg.	18th	
1989–90	7	2ª Reg.	2nd	
1990–91	6	1ª Reg.	4th	
1991–92	6	1ª Reg.	15th	
1992–93	7	2ª Reg.	1st	
1993–94	6	1ª Reg.	13th	
1994–95	6	1ª Reg.	5th	
1995–96	6	1ª Reg.	18th	
1996–97	7	2ª Reg.	7th	
1997–98	7	2ª Reg.	15th	
1998–99	7	2ª Reg.	12th	
1999–2000	7	2ª Reg.	14th	
2000–01	7	2ª Reg.	1st	
2001–02	6	1ª Reg.	4th	
2002–03	6	1ª Reg.	15th	
2003–04	7	2ª Reg.	11th	
2004–05	7	2ª Reg.	8th	
2005–06	7	2ª Reg.	7th	

Season	Tier	Division	Place	Copa del Rey
2006–07	7	2ª Reg.	15th	
2007–08	7	2ª Reg.	3rd	
2008–09	6	1ª Reg.	18th	
2009–10	7	2ª Reg.	12th	
2010–2015	DNP			
2015–16	7	2ª Reg.	1st	
2016–17	6	1ª Reg.	1st	
2017–18	5	Int. Pref.	1st	
2018–19	4	3ª	1st	
2019–20	4	3ª	4th	Second round
2020–21	3	2ª B	5th	
2021–22	4	2ª RFEF	18th	
2022–23	5	3ª Fed.	9th	
2023–24	5	3ª Fed.	10th	
2024–25	5	3ª Fed.	3rd	
2025–26	5	3ª Fed.	4th	
2026–27	4	2ª Fed.		

- 1 season in Segunda División B
- 2 seasons in Segunda Federación/Segunda División RFEF
- 5 seasons in Tercera División
- 4 seasons in Tercera Federación

== Current squad ==
As of 9 April 2021

Note: Flags indicate national team as defined under FIFA eligibility rules; some limited exceptions apply. Players may hold more than one non-FIFA nationality.

No.	Pos.	Nation	Player
1	GK	ESP	Nauzet García
2	DF	ESP	Aythami Álvarez
3	DF	ESP	Toni Segura
4	MF	ESP	Alberto Rodríguez
5	DF	ESP	David García
6	DF	ESP	Héctor Marrero
7	MF	ESP	Alexis Ramos (on loan from Las Palmas C)
8	MF	ESP	Juan Andrés Montesdeoca (captain)
9	FW	ESP	Eros Delgado
10	MF	ESP	David González
11	FW	ESP	Jonathan Quintero

No.	Pos.	Nation	Player
12	FW	ESP	Isma Fagir (on loan from Las Palmas B)
13	GK	ESP	Raúl Perera
14	FW	ESP	Aníbal Padrón
15	FW	ESP	Asdrúbal Padrón
17	FW	ESP	Lucas Acosta
18	MF	ESP	Julio Báez
19	FW	ESP	José María López Silva
20	MF	ESP	Pitu
21	DF	ESP	Jordan Hernández
22	DF	ESP	Álex Pérez
-	FW	ESP	Carlos Cid (on loan from Las Palmas B)
