= Toni Segura =

Spanish footballer (born 1998)

Personal information
- Full name: Antonio Segura González
- Date of birth: 31 March 1998 (age 28)
- Place of birth: Las Palmas, Spain
- Height: 1.75 m (5 ft 9 in)
- Position: Attacking midfielder

Team information
- Current team: Panadería Pulido

Youth career
- Unión Viera
- 2006–2012: Las Palmas
- 2012–2015: Betis
- 2016–2017: Real Madrid

Senior career*
Years	Team	Apps	(Gls)
2015–2016	Betis B	15	(1)
2017–2018	Real Madrid B	4	(0)
2018	→ Recreativo (loan)	7	(1)
2018–2020	Las Palmas B	33	(1)
2019–2020	Las Palmas	4	(0)
2020	Legia Warsaw II	1	(0)
2020–2021	Tamaraceite	17	(1)
2021	Arka Gdynia	0	(0)
2021	→ KKS 1925 Kalisz (loan)	15	(0)
2022–2023	Mensajero	45	(6)
2023–2024	Herbania	30	(3)
2024–	Panadería Pulido	6	(0)

International career
2014	Spain U16	3	(0)
2015	Spain U17	1	(0)
- * Club domestic league appearances and goals as of 12 October 2024

Antonio "Toni" Segura González (born 31 March 1998) is a Spanish footballer who plays as an attacking midfielder for Panadería Pulido.

== Club career ==
Toni was born in Las Palmas, Canary Islands, and joined Real Betis' youth setup in July 2012, from UD Las Palmas. Promoted to the reserves ahead of the 2015–16 season, he made his senior debut on 30 August 2015 by coming on as a second-half substitute for Julio Gracia in a 0–1 home loss against La Hoya Lorca CF.

Toni scored his first senior goal on 6 September 2015, netting the winner in a 4–3 home defeat of FC Jumilla. He finished the campaign with one goal in 15 appearances, as his side suffered relegation.

On 20 July 2016, Toni moved to Real Madrid and returned to youth football. He was promoted to the B-team in June of the following year, but only appeared sparingly before being loaned to fellow third division side Recreativo de Huelva on 20 January 2018.

On 8 August 2018, Toni terminated his contract with Los Blancos, and signed for another reserve team, UD Las Palmas Atlético two days later. He made his first team debut on 14 April 2019, replacing Deivid in a 0–3 home loss against Cádiz CF.

On 3 February 2020, Toni joined the Polish club Legia Warsaw to play for their reserve team. The Polish club confirmed on 8 July 2020 that Toni was to leave the club. Toni then returned to Spain and signed with UD Tamaraceite on 17 October 2020.

== Personal life ==
Toni's father, also named Antonio, was also a footballer and a midfielder. He also represented Las Palmas.
