= CA Central =

Association football club in Spain

Atlético Central
- Full name: Club Atlético Central
- Nickname: CAC
- Founded: 2018
- Ground: Centro Deportivo Vega de Triana, Seville, Andalusia, Spain
- Capacity: 1,000
- President: Jaime Soto and Alberto Herrera
- Manager: Josemi Márquez
- League: Segunda Federación – Group 4
- 2025–26: Tercera Federación – Group 10, 3rd of 18 (promoted via play-offs)
Home colours	Away colours

Club Atlético Central, is a Spanish football team based in Seville, in the autonomous community of Andalusia. Founded in 2018, they play in Segunda Federación – Group 4, holding home matches at Centro Deportivo Vega de Triana.

== History ==
Founded in August 2018 by Jaime Soto and Alberto Herrera, sons of singer José Manuel Soto and journalist Carlos Herrera, respectively, Atlético Central achieved three consecutive promotions in their first three senior seasons, reaching the División de Honor. In April 2024, after three campaigns in the sixth tier, the club achieved a first-ever promotion to Tercera División with two rounds to go.

== Season to season ==
Season	Tier	Division	Place	Copa del Rey
2018–19	8	3ª And.	3rd	
2019–20	7	2ª And.	1st	
2020–21	6	1ª And.	1st	
2021–22	6	Div. Hon.	10th	
2022–23	6	Div. Hon.	11th	
2023–24	6	Div. Hon.	3rd	
2024–25	5	3ª Fed.	4th	
2025–26	5	3ª Fed.	3rd	
2026–27	4	2ª Fed.		

- 1 season in Segunda Federación
- 2 seasons in Tercera Federación
