= 2016–17 UEFA Youth League group stage =

Football tournament group stage

The 2016–17 UEFA Youth League UEFA Champions League Path (group stage) was played from 13 September to 7 December 2016. A total of 32 teams competed in the UEFA Champions League Path (group stage) to decide 16 of the 24 places in the knockout phase of the 2016–17 UEFA Youth League.

== Draw ==
The youth teams of the 32 clubs which qualified for the 2016–17 UEFA Champions League group stage entered the UEFA Champions League Path.

For the UEFA Champions League Path, the 32 teams were drawn into eight groups of four. There was no separate draw held, with the group compositions identical to the draw for the 2016–17 UEFA Champions League group stage, which was held on 25 August 2016, 18:00 CEST, at the Grimaldi Forum in Monaco.

Key to colours
Group winners advanced to the round of 16
Group runners-up advanced to the play-offs

Pot 1 Team (Spain) Real Madrid (Spain) Barcelona (England) Leicester City (Germany) Bayern Munich (Italy) Juventus (Portugal) Benfica (France) Paris Saint-Germain (Russia) CSKA Moscow	Pot 2 Team (Spain) Atlético Madrid (Germany) Borussia Dortmund (England) Arsenal (England) Manchester City (Spain) Sevilla (Portugal) Porto (Italy) Napoli (Germany) Bayer Leverkusen	Pot 3 Team (Switzerland) Basel (England) Tottenham Hotspur (Ukraine) Dynamo Kyiv (France) Lyon (Netherlands) PSV Eindhoven (Portugal) Sporting CP (Belgium) Club Brugge (Germany) Borussia Mönchengladbach	Pot 4 Team (Scotland) Celtic (France) Monaco (Turkey) Beşiktaş (Poland) Legia Warsaw (Croatia) Dinamo Zagreb (Bulgaria) Ludogorets Razgrad (Denmark) Copenhagen (Russia) Rostov

== Format ==
In each group, teams played against each other home-and-away in a round-robin format. The eight group winners advanced to the round of 16, while the eight runners-up advanced to the play-offs, where they were joined by the eight second round winners from the Domestic Champions Path.

=== Tiebreakers ===
The teams were ranked according to points (3 points for a win, 1 point for a draw, 0 points for a loss). If two or more teams were equal on points on completion of the group matches, the following criteria were applied in the order given to determine the rankings (regulations Article 14.03):

1. higher number of points obtained in the group matches played among the teams in question;
2. superior goal difference from the group matches played among the teams in question;
3. higher number of goals scored in the group matches played among the teams in question;
4. higher number of goals scored away from home in the group matches played among the teams in question;
5. if, after having applied criteria 1 to 4, teams still had an equal ranking, criteria 1 to 4 were reapplied exclusively to the matches between the teams in question to determine their final rankings. If this procedure did not lead to a decision, criteria 6 to 12 applied;
6. superior goal difference in all group matches;
7. higher number of goals scored in all group matches;
8. higher number of away goals scored in all group matches;
9. higher number of wins in all group matches;
10. higher number of away wins in all group matches;
11. lower disciplinary points total based only on yellow and red cards received in all group matches (red card = 3 points, yellow card = 1 point, expulsion for two yellow cards in one match = 3 points);
12. drawing of lots.

== Groups ==
The matchdays were 13–14 September, 27–28 September, 18–19 October, 1–2 November, 22–23 November, and 6–7 December 2016.

Times up to 29 October 2016 (matchdays 1–3) were CEST (UTC+2), thereafter (matchdays 4–6) times were CET (UTC+1).

=== Group A ===
Pos	Team	Pld	W	D	L	GF	GA	GD	Pts	Qualification	PAR	BSL	ARS	LUD
1	(France) Paris Saint-Germain	6	4	2	0	21	7	+14	14	Advance to round of 16	—	4–1	0–0	4–1
2	(Switzerland) Basel	6	3	1	2	11	9	+2	10	Advance to play-offs	2–3	—	1–1	1–0
3	(England) Arsenal	6	1	4	1	8	6	+2	7		2–2	1–2	—	3–0
4	(Bulgaria) Ludogorets Razgrad	6	0	1	5	3	21	−18	1		1–8	0–4	1–1	—

Source: UEFA
13 September 2016
16:00

Basel (Switzerland)	1–0	(Bulgaria) Ludogorets Razgrad
Pacheco 90+1'	Report

Leichtathletik Stadion St. Jakob, Basel
Attendance: 250
Referee: Boris Marhefka (Slovakia)
13 September 2016
18:00

Paris Saint-Germain (France)	0–0	(England) Arsenal
	Report

Stade Municipal Georges Lefèvre, Saint-Germain-en-Laye
Attendance: 315
Referee: Jonathan Lardot (Belgium)

28 September 2016
15:00

Ludogorets Razgrad (Bulgaria)	1–8	(France) Paris Saint-Germain
Aleksandrov 38'	Report	Essende 9', 32'; Weah 29', 48', 85'; Nkunku 39', 79' (pen.); Diaby 88'

Georgi Asparuhov Stadium, Sofia
Attendance: 300
Referee: Radu Petrescu (Romania)
28 September 2016
15:00

Arsenal (England)	1–2	(Switzerland) Basel
Dragomir 55'	Report	Cümart 40'; Manzambi 90+4' (pen.)

Meadow Park, Borehamwood
Attendance: 324
Referee: Tim Marshall (Northern Ireland)

19 October 2016
14:00

Arsenal (England)	3–0	(Bulgaria) Ludogorets Razgrad
Nelson 3'; Nketiah 81' (pen.), 87'	Report

Meadow Park, Borehamwood
Attendance: 226
Referee: Anders Poulsen (Denmark)
19 October 2016
16:00

Paris Saint-Germain (France)	4–1	(Switzerland) Basel
Dembélé 35'; Diaby 47'; Giacomini 74'; Nkunku 87'	Report	Manzambi 76'

Stade Municipal Georges Lefèvre, Saint-Germain-en-Laye
Attendance: 482
Referee: Nikola Dabanović (Montenegro)

1 November 2016
15:00

Ludogorets Razgrad (Bulgaria)	1–1	(England) Arsenal
P. Petrov 73'	Report	Nelson 33'

Georgi Asparuhov Stadium, Sofia
Attendance: 300
Referee: Charalambos Kalogeropoulos (Greece)
1 November 2016
16:00

Basel (Switzerland)	2–3	(France) Paris Saint-Germain
Liechti 16'; Heric 47'	Report	Diaby 40'; Nkunku 76', 80'

Leichtathletik Stadion St. Jakob, Basel
Attendance: 700
Referee: Aleksandrs Anufrijevs (Latvia)

23 November 2016
14:00

Arsenal (England)	2–2	(France) Paris Saint-Germain
Mavididi 40' (pen.), 90+2'	Report	Bernede 17'; Eboa Eboa 83'

Meadow Park, Borehamwood
Attendance: 272
Referee: Andrew Dallas (Scotland)
23 November 2016
14:00

Ludogorets Razgrad (Bulgaria)	0–4	(Switzerland) Basel
	Report	Rashiti 37', 53', 84' (pen.); Manzambi 61' (pen.)

Georgi Asparuhov Stadium, Sofia
Attendance: 120
Referee: Fyodor Zammit (Malta)

6 December 2016
15:00

Paris Saint-Germain (France)	4–1	(Bulgaria) Ludogorets Razgrad
Ikoné 32', 62'; Essende 74', 90'	Report	P. Petrov 34'

Stade Municipal Georges Lefèvre, Saint-Germain-en-Laye
Attendance: 250
Referee: Johnny Casanova (San Marino)
6 December 2016
16:00

Basel (Switzerland)	1–1	(England) Arsenal
Liechti 90+2'	Report	Nketiah 80'

Leichtathletik Stadion St. Jakob, Basel
Attendance: 650
Referee: Peter Kralović (Slovakia)

=== Group B ===
Pos	Team	Pld	W	D	L	GF	GA	GD	Pts	Qualification	DKV	BEN	NAP	BES
1	(Ukraine) Dynamo Kyiv	6	5	1	0	16	7	+9	16	Advance to round of 16	—	2–1	4–1	3–1
2	(Portugal) Benfica	6	3	1	2	10	6	+4	10	Advance to play-offs	1–2	—	2–0	0–0
3	(Italy) Napoli	6	1	1	4	6	13	−7	4		0–2	2–3	—	2–2
4	(Turkey) Beşiktaş	6	0	3	3	6	12	−6	3		3–3	0–3	0–1	—

Source: UEFA
13 September 2016
13:00

Dynamo Kyiv (Ukraine)	4–1	(Italy) Napoli
Rusyn 50', 77'; Mykhaylychenko 54'; Lednev 81'	Report	Alibekov 25' (o.g.)

Valeriy Lobanovskyi Dynamo Stadium, Kyiv
Attendance: 1,511
Referee: Tihomir Pejin (Croatia)
13 September 2016
16:00

Benfica (Portugal)	0–0	(Turkey) Beşiktaş
	Report

Caixa Futebol Campus, Seixal
Attendance: 576
Referee: Bartosz Frankowski (Poland)

28 September 2016
13:00

Beşiktaş (Turkey)	3–3	(Ukraine) Dynamo Kyiv
Öztürk 3'; Abay 24'; Enes Durmuş 40'	Report	Lednev 59'; Yanakov 66'; Akıncı 69' (o.g.)

Yusuf Ziya Öniş Stadium, Istanbul
Attendance: 700
Referee: Enea Jorgji (Albania)
28 September 2016
16:00

Napoli (Italy)	2–3	(Portugal) Benfica
De Simone 79', 85'	Report	Félix 24'; Soares 55' (pen.); Florentino 86'

Stadio Comunale Pasquale Ianniello, Frattamaggiore
Attendance: 1,024
Referee: Alain Bieri (Switzerland)

19 October 2016
13:00

Dynamo Kyiv (Ukraine)	2–1	(Portugal) Benfica
Yanakov 20'; Buletsa 57'	Report	Djú 90+3'

Valeriy Lobanovskyi Dynamo Stadium, Kyiv
Attendance: 876
Referee: Sándor Szabó (Hungary)
19 October 2016
15:00

Napoli (Italy)	2–2	(Turkey) Beşiktaş
Russo 35'; Liguori 85'	Report	Çelebi 28'; Durmuş 59'

Stadio Comunale Pasquale Ianniello, Frattamaggiore
Attendance: 523
Referee: Edin Jakupović (Bosnia and Herzegovina)

1 November 2016
12:00

Beşiktaş (Turkey)	0–1	(Italy) Napoli
	Report	Negro 12' (pen.)

Yusuf Ziya Öniş Stadium, Istanbul
Attendance: 309
Referee: Erez Papir (Israel)
1 November 2016
16:00

Benfica (Portugal)	1–2	(Ukraine) Dynamo Kyiv
Félix 18' (pen.)	Report	Lednev 47'; Alibekov 86' (pen.)

Caixa Futebol Campus, Seixal
Attendance: 1,199
Referee: Alain Durieux (Luxembourg)

23 November 2016
12:00

Beşiktaş (Turkey)	0–3	(Portugal) Benfica
	Report	Gomes 76'; Fernandes 87'; Jorginho 90+1'

Yusuf Ziya Öniş Stadium, Istanbul
Attendance: 350
Referee: Dimitrios Massias (Cyprus)
23 November 2016
15:00

Napoli (Italy)	0–2	(Ukraine) Dynamo Kyiv
	Report	Yanakov 20'; Lednev 58'

Stadio Comunale Pasquale Ianniello, Frattamaggiore
Attendance: 622
Referee: Boris Marhefka (Slovakia)

6 December 2016
13:00

Dynamo Kyiv (Ukraine)	3–1	(Turkey) Beşiktaş
Lednev 39', 64'; Buletsa 73'	Report	Öztürk 43'

Valeriy Lobanovskyi Dynamo Stadium, Kyiv
Attendance: 712
Referee: Denis Scherbakov (Belarus)
6 December 2016
18:00

Benfica (Portugal)	2–0	(Italy) Napoli
Félix 47'; Carvalho 75' (pen.)	Report

Caixa Futebol Campus, Seixal
Attendance: 300
Referee: Jonathan Lardot (Belgium)

=== Group C ===
Pos	Team	Pld	W	D	L	GF	GA	GD	Pts	Qualification	BAR	MCI	BMG	CEL
1	(Spain) Barcelona	6	5	0	1	13	5	+8	15	Advance to round of 16	—	1–0	1–2	2–1
2	(England) Manchester City	6	4	0	2	13	7	+6	12	Advance to play-offs	0–2	—	4–1	3–2
3	(Germany) Borussia Mönchengladbach	6	2	1	3	10	12	−2	7		1–3	1–2	—	4–1
4	(Scotland) Celtic	6	0	1	5	6	18	−12	1		1–4	0–4	1–1	—

Source: UEFA
13 September 2016
16:00

Barcelona (Spain)	2–1	(Scotland) Celtic
Pérez 3'; Guillemenot 64'	Report	Aitchison 72'

Mini Estadi, Barcelona
Attendance: 480
Referee: Fábio Veríssimo (Portugal)
13 September 2016
16:00

Manchester City (England)	4–1	(Germany) Borussia Mönchengladbach
Nmecha 6' (pen.), 10'; Hanraths 58' (o.g.); Sancho 78'	Report	Yosef 75'

Academy Stadium, Manchester
Attendance: 502
Referee: Gunnar Jarl Jónsson (Iceland)

28 September 2016
14:00

Borussia Mönchengladbach (Germany)	1–3	(Spain) Barcelona
Schikowski 45+1'	Report	Dani García 9'; Guillemenot 39'; Mboula 90+1'

Fohlenplatz, Mönchengladbach
Attendance: 1,332
Referee: Benoît Millot (France)
28 September 2016
18:00

Celtic (Scotland)	0–4	(England) Manchester City
	Report	Dilrosun 25'; Kongolo 32'; Buckley-Ricketts 71', 89'

Cappielow Park, Greenock
Attendance: 246
Referee: Bart Vertenten (Belgium)

19 October 2016
15:00

Celtic (Scotland)	1–1	(Germany) Borussia Mönchengladbach
Johnston 22'	Report	Jahn 57'

Cappielow Park, Greenock
Attendance: 341
Referee: Paul McLaughlin (Republic of Ireland)
19 October 2016
16:00

Barcelona (Spain)	1–0	(England) Manchester City
Pérez 86'	Report

Mini Estadi, Barcelona
Attendance: 1,303
Referee: Sandro Schärer (Switzerland)

1 November 2016
14:00

Borussia Mönchengladbach (Germany)	4–1	(Scotland) Celtic
Schikowski 21', 28', 31'; Hanraths 83'	Report	Hendry 12' (pen.)

Fohlenplatz, Mönchengladbach
Attendance: 777
Referee: Nikola Dabanović (Montenegro)
1 November 2016
16:00

Manchester City (England)	0–2	(Spain) Barcelona
	Report	Mboula 19'; Cucurella 45'

Academy Stadium, Manchester
Attendance: 1,190
Referee: Arnold Hunter (Northern Ireland)

23 November 2016
15:00

Celtic (Scotland)	1–4	(Spain) Barcelona
Aitchison 84'	Report	Mboula 8', 36'; Guillemenot 44'; Dani García 55'

Cappielow Park, Greenock
Attendance: 296
Referee: Martin Lundby (Norway)
23 November 2016
16:00

Borussia Mönchengladbach (Germany)	1–2	(England) Manchester City
Jahn 33'	Report	Fernandes 7'; Brahim 58'

Fohlenplatz, Mönchengladbach
Attendance: 551
Referee: Bartosz Frankowski (Poland)

6 December 2016
14:00

Manchester City (England)	3–2	(Scotland) Celtic
Kongolo 50'; Sancho 81'; González 90+3'	Report	Johnston 5' (pen.); Archibald 32'

Academy Stadium, Manchester
Attendance: 613
Referee: Alex Troleis (Faroe Islands)
6 December 2016
16:00

Barcelona (Spain)	1–2	(Germany) Borussia Mönchengladbach
Mboula 79'	Report	Jahn 22'; Simakala 85'

Mini Estadi, Barcelona
Attendance: 1,138
Referee: João Pinheiro (Portugal)

=== Group D ===
Pos	Team	Pld	W	D	L	GF	GA	GD	Pts	Qualification	PSV	ATM	BAY	RST
1	(Netherlands) PSV Eindhoven	6	4	1	1	16	2	+14	13	Advance to round of 16	—	0–0	2–0	6–0
2	(Spain) Atlético Madrid	6	3	2	1	8	5	+3	11	Advance to play-offs	2–0	—	1–3	1–0
3	(Germany) Bayern Munich	6	3	1	2	9	8	+1	10		0–2	1–1	—	4–2
4	(Russia) Rostov	6	0	0	6	3	21	−18	0		0–6	1–3	0–1	—

Source: UEFA
13 September 2016
14:00

Bayern Munich (Germany)	4–2	(Russia) Rostov
Shabani 17'; Friedl 43', 77' (pen.); Crnički 87' (pen.)	Report	Solovyev 37', 90'

Grünwalder Stadion, Munich
Attendance: 315
Referee: Jørgen Burchardt (Denmark)
13 September 2016
16:00

PSV Eindhoven (Netherlands)	0–0	(Spain) Atlético Madrid
	Report

De Herdgang, Eindhoven
Attendance: 350
Referee: Petr Ardeleanu (Czech Republic)

28 September 2016
13:00

Rostov (Russia)	0–6	(Netherlands) PSV Eindhoven
	Report	Rigo 7', 11' (pen.); Daneels 22'; Sukhomlinov 30' (o.g.); Scamacca 49'; Sviridov 60' (o.g.)

Lokomotiv Stadium, Bataysk
Attendance: 350
Referee: Lasha Silagava (Georgia)
28 September 2016
16:00

Atlético Madrid (Spain)	1–3	(Germany) Bayern Munich
Isherwood 72' (o.g.)	Report	Tillman 4'; Crnički 60'; Fein 90+3'

Cerro del Espino, Majadahonda
Attendance: 600
Referee: Robert Madley (England)

19 October 2016
13:00

Rostov (Russia)	1–3	(Spain) Atlético Madrid
Veber 64'	Report	Neskoromny 45+1' (o.g.); Ballesteros 62'; Salomón 83'

Lokomotiv Stadium, Bataysk
Attendance: 1,500
Referee: Srđan Jovanović (Serbia)
19 October 2016
18:00

Bayern Munich (Germany)	0–2	(Netherlands) PSV Eindhoven
	Report	Abels 28'; Lammers 55'

Grünwalder Stadion, Munich
Attendance: 550
Referee: Zbynek Proske (Czech Republic)

1 November 2016
12:00

Atlético Madrid (Spain)	1–0	(Russia) Rostov
Navarro 72'	Report

Cerro del Espino, Majadahonda
Attendance: 393
Referee: Kevin Clancy (Scotland)
1 November 2016
14:00

PSV Eindhoven (Netherlands)	2–0	(Germany) Bayern Munich
Friedl 38' (o.g.); Verreth 68'	Report

De Herdgang, Eindhoven
Attendance: 800
Referee: Sergejus Slyva (Lithuania)

23 November 2016
10:00

Rostov (Russia)	0–1	(Germany) Bayern Munich
	Report	Wintzheimer 53'

Lokomotiv Stadium, Bataysk
Attendance: 300
Referee: Suren Baliyan (Armenia)
23 November 2016
16:00

Atlético Madrid (Spain)	2–0	(Netherlands) PSV Eindhoven
Navarro 29'; Moya 90+2'	Report

Cerro del Espino, Majadahonda
Attendance: 302
Referee: Frank Schneider (France)

6 December 2016
14:00

Bayern Munich (Germany)	1–1	(Spain) Atlético Madrid
Meier 38'	Report	Schiappacasse 79'

Grünwalder Stadion, Munich
Attendance: 521
Referee: Nikola Popov (Bulgaria)
6 December 2016
16:00

PSV Eindhoven (Netherlands)	6–0	(Russia) Rostov
Fernandes 1'; Lammers 12'; Daneels 19', 25'; Gakpo 73', 75'	Report

De Herdgang, Eindhoven
Attendance: 660
Referee: Mohammed Al-Hakim (Sweden)

=== Group E ===
Pos	Team	Pld	W	D	L	GF	GA	GD	Pts	Qualification	CSKA	MON	LEV	TOT
1	(Russia) CSKA Moscow	6	4	1	1	15	6	+9	13	Advance to round of 16	—	4–1	2–1	3–2
2	(France) Monaco	6	4	0	2	10	14	−4	12	Advance to play-offs	0–5	—	2–1	2–1
3	(Germany) Bayer Leverkusen	6	2	0	4	9	10	−1	6		2–1	1–2	—	3–1
4	(England) Tottenham Hotspur	6	1	1	4	8	12	−4	4		0–0	2–3	2–1	—

Source: UEFA
14 September 2016
14:00

Bayer Leverkusen (Germany)	2–1	(Russia) CSKA Moscow
Rhein 28'; Akkaynak 39'	Report	Pukhov 35' (pen.)

Ulrich Haberland Stadion, Leverkusen
Attendance: 450
Referee: Sergejus Slyva (Lithuania)
14 September 2016
15:00

Tottenham Hotspur (England)	2–3	(France) Monaco
Shashoua 24'; Harrison 78' (pen.)	Report	Walkes 7' (o.g.); Cardona 43', 62'

Tottenham Hotspur Training Centre, London
Attendance: 178
Referee: Andrew Dallas (Scotland)

27 September 2016
13:00

CSKA Moscow (Russia)	3–2	(England) Tottenham Hotspur
Zhamaletdinov 59'; Oleynikov 66'; Kuchaev 90+3'	Report	Griffiths 39', 90'

Oktyabr Stadium, Moscow
Attendance: 350
Referee: Juri Frischer (Estonia)
27 September 2016
15:00

Monaco (France)	2–1	(Germany) Bayer Leverkusen
Cardona 45+3' (pen.), 76'	Report	Akkaynak 13'

Stade de formation AS Monaco 1, La Turbie
Attendance: 194
Referee: Marius Avram (Romania)

18 October 2016
13:00

CSKA Moscow (Russia)	4–1	(France) Monaco
Zhamaletdinov 24', 54'; Ouedraogo 79' (o.g.); Chalov 89'	Report	Muyumba 30'

Oktyabr Stadium Artificial Turf, Moscow
Attendance: 250
Referee: Zaven Hovhannisyan (Armenia)
18 October 2016
16:00

Bayer Leverkusen (Germany)	3–1	(England) Tottenham Hotspur
Bednarczyk 57'; Walkes 67' (o.g.); Handwerker 90+2' (pen.)	Report	Roles 18'

Ulrich Haberland Stadion, Leverkusen
Attendance: 783
Referee: Fran Jović (Croatia)

2 November 2016
15:00

Monaco (France)	0–5	(Russia) CSKA Moscow
	Report	Chalov 8', 43' (pen.), 45', 49'; Zhamaletdinov 79'

Stade de formation AS Monaco 1, La Turbie
Attendance: 239
Referee: Fedayi San (Switzerland)
2 November 2016
18:00

Tottenham Hotspur (England)	2–1	(Germany) Bayer Leverkusen
Boeder 35' (o.g.); Harrison 55'	Report	Rhein 90+4'

Tottenham Hotspur Training Centre, London
Attendance: 117
Referee: Neil Doyle (Republic of Ireland)

22 November 2016
12:00

CSKA Moscow (Russia)	2–1	(Germany) Bayer Leverkusen
Khosonov 24'; Zhamaletdinov 74'	Report	Schreck 30'

Oktyabr Stadium Artificial Turf, Moscow
Attendance: 350
Referee: Aleksandrs Golubevs (Latvia)
22 November 2016
15:00

Monaco (France)	2–1	(England) Tottenham Hotspur
Walkes 62' (o.g.); Sylla 67'	Report	Sterling 52'

Stade de formation AS Monaco 1, La Turbie
Attendance: 187
Referee: Pavel Orel (Czech Republic)

7 December 2016
14:00

Bayer Leverkusen (Germany)	1–2	(France) Monaco
Handwerker 9'	Report	Appin 36'; Cardona 59'

Ulrich Haberland Stadion, Leverkusen
Attendance: 365
Referee: Nenad Djokić (Serbia)
7 December 2016
15:00

Tottenham Hotspur (England)	0–0	(Russia) CSKA Moscow
	Report

Tottenham Hotspur Training Centre, London
Attendance: 147
Referee: Tim Marshall (Northern Ireland)

=== Group F ===
Pos	Team	Pld	W	D	L	GF	GA	GD	Pts	Qualification	RMA	DOR	SPO	LEG
1	(Spain) Real Madrid	6	4	1	1	15	10	+5	13	Advance to round of 16	—	1–3	1–1	3–2
2	(Germany) Borussia Dortmund	6	2	2	2	11	11	0	8	Advance to play-offs	2–5	—	0–1	3–3
3	(Portugal) Sporting CP	6	1	3	2	6	9	−3	6		1–3	1–1	—	2–2
4	(Poland) Legia Warsaw	6	1	2	3	10	12	−2	5		1–2	0–2	2–0	—

Source: UEFA
14 September 2016
16:00

Legia Warsaw (Poland)	0–2	(Germany) Borussia Dortmund
	Report	Arweiler 10'; Małachowski 68' (o.g.)

MOSiR Stadium, Ząbki
Attendance: 1,160
Referee: Roomer Tarajev (Estonia)
14 September 2016
18:00

Real Madrid (Spain)	1–1	(Portugal) Sporting CP
Díaz 55'	Report	Marques 90+3'

Alfredo di Stéfano, Madrid
Attendance: 437
Referee: Frank Schneider (France)

27 September 2016
16:00

Borussia Dortmund (Germany)	2–5	(Spain) Real Madrid
Arweiler 12'; Amenyido 52'	Report	Óscar 10'; Hakimi 28'; M. Rodríguez 35'; Díaz 57'; García 63'

Montanhydraulik-Stadion, Holzwickede
Attendance: 1,509
Referee: Nikola Popov (Bulgaria)
27 September 2016
16:00

Sporting CP (Portugal)	2–2	(Poland) Legia Warsaw
Marques 31'; Moreira 79'	Report	Kulenović 38'; Szczepański 90+4'

CGD Stadium Aurélio Pereira, Alcochete
Attendance: 185
Referee: Alexander Harkam (Austria)

18 October 2016
16:00

Sporting CP (Portugal)	1–1	(Germany) Borussia Dortmund
Marques 45'	Report	Kyeremateng 63'

CGD Stadium Aurélio Pereira, Alcochete
Attendance: 239
Referee: Alexandre Boucaut (Belgium)
18 October 2016
16:00

Real Madrid (Spain)	3–2	(Poland) Legia Warsaw
Franchu 4'; Gómez 61'; Szymański 76' (o.g.)	Report	Kulenović 41'; Bondarenko 65'

Alfredo di Stéfano, Madrid
Attendance: 465
Referee: Petr Ardeleanu (Czech Republic)

2 November 2016
14:00

Borussia Dortmund (Germany)	0–1	(Portugal) Sporting CP
	Report	Leão 41'

Montanhydraulik-Stadion, Holzwickede
Attendance: 659
Referee: Srđan Jovanović (Serbia)
2 November 2016
16:00

Legia Warsaw (Poland)	1–2	(Spain) Real Madrid
Nawotka 90+4'	Report	Segura 40'; Alberto 45'

MOSiR Stadium, Ząbki
Attendance: 653
Referee: Alan Mario Sant (Malta)

22 November 2016
14:00

Sporting CP (Portugal)	1–3	(Spain) Real Madrid
Bragança 69'	Report	Díaz 7'; Hernando 38'; Franchu 73'

CGD Stadium Aurélio Pereira, Alcochete
Attendance: 263
Referee: Mads-Kristoffer Kristoffersen (Denmark)
22 November 2016
14:00

Borussia Dortmund (Germany)	3–3	(Poland) Legia Warsaw
Kyeremateng 10'; Bruun Larsen 59'; Amenyido 79'	Report	Szymański 31', 88'; Szczepański 41'

Dortmund Brackel Training Ground, Dortmund
Attendance: 135
Referee: Yaroslav Kozyk (Ukraine)

7 December 2016
16:00

Legia Warsaw (Poland)	2–0	(Portugal) Sporting CP
Praszelik 3'; Michalak 55'	Report

Stadion Znicza Pruszków, Pruszków
Attendance: 823
Referee: Dennis Antamo (Finland)
7 December 2016
18:00

Real Madrid (Spain)	1–3	(Germany) Borussia Dortmund
Llario 45+3'	Report	Baxmann 52'; Amenyido 68'; Kopacz 82'

Alfredo di Stéfano, Madrid
Attendance: 483
Referee: Paul McLaughlin (Republic of Ireland)

=== Group G ===
Pos	Team	Pld	W	D	L	GF	GA	GD	Pts	Qualification	POR	CPH	BRU	LEI
1	(Portugal) Porto	6	4	0	2	12	8	+4	12	Advance to round of 16	—	4–1	1–3	2–1
2	(Denmark) Copenhagen	6	3	1	2	12	10	+2	10	Advance to play-offs	3–1	—	0–0	3–2
3	(Belgium) Club Brugge	6	3	1	2	8	9	−1	10		0–2	0–3	—	2–1
4	(England) Leicester City	6	1	0	5	9	14	−5	3		0–2	3–2	2–3	—

Source: UEFA
13 September 2016
19:00

Club Brugge (Belgium)	2–1	(England) Leicester City
Van Vaerenbergh 15', 39' (pen.)	Report	Muskwe 43'

Schiervelde Stadion, Roeselare
Attendance: 690
Referee: Laurent Kopriwa (Luxembourg)
14 September 2016
16:00

Porto (Portugal)	4–1	(Denmark) Copenhagen
Cassamá 19'; Rui Pedro 51', 59'; Rui Pires 90+3' (pen.)	Report	Wind 12'

CTFD PortoGaia, Vila Nova de Gaia
Attendance: 408
Referee: Fedayi San (Switzerland)

27 September 2016
15:00

Leicester City (England)	0–2	(Portugal) Porto
	Report	Bruno Costa 69'; Rui Pedro 86'

Loughborough University Stadium, Loughborough
Attendance: 523
Referee: Andrew Davey (Northern Ireland)
27 September 2016
16:00

Copenhagen (Denmark)	0–0	(Belgium) Club Brugge
	Report

Østerbro Stadium, Copenhagen
Attendance: 687
Referee: Martin Lundby (Norway)

18 October 2016
14:00

Leicester City (England)	3–2	(Denmark) Copenhagen
Pașcanu 45+1'; Ndukwu 51', 66'	Report	Røjkjær 12'; Wind 72'

Loughborough University Stadium, Loughborough
Attendance: 300
Referee: Bryn Markham-Jones (Wales)
18 October 2016
14:00

Club Brugge (Belgium)	0–2	(Portugal) Porto
	Report	Rui Pedro 43', 58'

Schiervelde Stadion, Roeselare
Attendance: 470
Referee: Dominik Ouschan (Austria)

2 November 2016
15:00

Porto (Portugal)	1–3	(Belgium) Club Brugge
Rui Pedro 90+3'	Report	Osei-Berkoe 20', 36'; Schryvers 86'

CTFD PortoGaia, Vila Nova de Gaia
Attendance: 409
Referee: Manuel Schuettengruber (Austria)
2 November 2016
16:00

Copenhagen (Denmark)	3–2	(England) Leicester City
Kristoffersen 1'; Røjkjær 8'; Hjulmand 90+3'	Report	Barnes 14', 51'

Østerbro Stadium, Copenhagen
Attendance: 374
Referee: Ville Nevalainen (Finland)

22 November 2016
15:45

Leicester City (England)	2–3	(Belgium) Club Brugge
Muskwe 65'; Ughelumba 71'	Report	Van Vaerenbergh 18', 39' (pen.); Ito 53'

Leicester City Training Ground, Leicester
Attendance: 80
Referee: Vilhjálmur Alvar Þórarinsson (Iceland)
22 November 2016
16:00

Copenhagen (Denmark)	3–1	(Portugal) Porto
Nartey 50'; Røjkjær 51'; Kristoffersen 90'	Report	Cassamá 45'

Østerbro Stadium, Copenhagen
Attendance: 450
Referee: Juri Frischer (Estonia)

7 December 2016
14:00

Porto (Portugal)	2–1	(England) Leicester City
Cardoso 21', 56'	Report	Moore 55'

CTFD PortoGaia, Vila Nova de Gaia
Attendance: 311
Referee: Laurent Kopriwa (Luxembourg)
7 December 2016
16:00

Club Brugge (Belgium)	0–3	(Denmark) Copenhagen
	Report	Vesterlund 13'; Kristoffersen 56'; Wind 77' (pen.)

Schiervelde Stadion, Roeselare
Attendance: 750
Referee: Tihomir Pejin (Croatia)

=== Group H ===
Pos	Team	Pld	W	D	L	GF	GA	GD	Pts	Qualification	SEV	JUV	LYO	DZG
1	(Spain) Sevilla	6	3	1	2	9	8	+1	10	Advance to round of 16	—	0–2	2–1	1–1
2	(Italy) Juventus	6	3	0	3	8	5	+3	9	Advance to play-offs	2–1	—	0–1	0–1
3	(France) Lyon	6	3	0	3	6	7	−1	9		0–1	0–3	—	2–0
4	(Croatia) Dinamo Zagreb	6	2	1	3	7	10	−3	7		2–4	2–1	1–2	—

Source: UEFA
14 September 2016
15:00

Lyon (France)	2–0	(Croatia) Dinamo Zagreb
Vieira 18'; Maolida 58'	Report

Groupama Academy Stadium, Décines
Attendance: 670
Referee: Manuel Schuettengruber (Austria)
14 September 2016
16:00

Juventus (Italy)	2–1	(Spain) Sevilla
Kean 35'; Bove 90+5'	Report	Mena 53'

Juventus Center, Vinovo
Attendance: 490
Referee: Christian Dingert (Germany)

27 September 2016
14:00

Sevilla (Spain)	2–1	(France) Lyon
Mena 35'; González 90'	Report	Aouar 6' (pen.)

Felipe Del Valle, La Rinconada
Attendance: 672
Referee: Sven Bindels (Luxembourg)
27 September 2016
16:00

Dinamo Zagreb (Croatia)	2–1	(Italy) Juventus
Božić 17', 90+2'	Report	Kean 12'

Stadion Hitrec-Kacian, Zagreb
Attendance: 1,372
Referee: Nikola Dabanović (Montenegro)

18 October 2016
14:00

Lyon (France)	0–3	(Italy) Juventus
	Report	Caligara 34'; Léris 61'; Clemenza 72'

Groupama Academy Stadium, Décines
Attendance: 878
Referee: Antti Munukka (Finland)
18 October 2016
15:00

Dinamo Zagreb (Croatia)	2–4	(Spain) Sevilla
Božić 6', 31'	Report	Pérez 3'; Colmenero 14', 45+1', 89'

Stadion Hitrec-Kacian, Zagreb
Attendance: 850
Referee: Dimitrios Massias (Cyprus)

2 November 2016
14:00

Sevilla (Spain)	1–1	(Croatia) Dinamo Zagreb
Soldo 5' (o.g.)	Report	Božić 58'

Felipe Del Valle, La Rinconada
Attendance: 500
Referee: Bart Vertenten (Belgium)
2 November 2016
18:00

Juventus (Italy)	0–1	(France) Lyon
	Report	Aouar 37'

Juventus Center, Vinovo
Attendance: 490
Referee: Ognjen Valjić (Bosnia and Herzegovina)

22 November 2016
14:00

Dinamo Zagreb (Croatia)	1–2	(France) Lyon
Špikić 8'	Report	Aouar 66'; Maolida 83'

Stadion Hitrec-Kacian, Zagreb
Attendance: 936
Referee: Marius Avram (Romania)
22 November 2016
16:00

Sevilla (Spain)	0–2	(Italy) Juventus
	Report	Clemenza 4'; Zeqiri 63'

Felipe Del Valle, La Rinconada
Attendance: 670
Referee: Robert Madley (England)

7 December 2016
15:00

Lyon (France)	0–1	(Spain) Sevilla
	Report	Colmenero 19'

Groupama Academy Stadium, Décines
Attendance: 584
Referee: Georgios Kominis (Greece)
7 December 2016
15:00

Juventus (Italy)	0–1	(Croatia) Dinamo Zagreb
	Report	Đurić 78'

Juventus Stadium, Turin
Attendance: 470
Referee: Alain Durieux (Luxembourg)
