= 2016–17 UEFA Youth League Domestic Champions Path =

European club football tournament

The 2016–17 UEFA Youth League Domestic Champions Path was played from 21 September to 30 November 2016. A total of 32 teams competed in the Domestic Champions Path to decide 8 of the 24 places in the knockout phase of the 2016–17 UEFA Youth League.

Times up to 29 October 2016 (first round) were CEST (UTC+2), thereafter (second round) times were CET (UTC+1).

== Draw ==
The youth domestic champions of the top 32 associations according to their 2015 UEFA country coefficients entered the Domestic Champions Path. Associations without a youth domestic champion as well as domestic champions already included in the UEFA Champions League path were replaced by the next association in the UEFA ranking.

For the Domestic Champions Path, the 32 teams were drawn into two rounds of two-legged home-and-away ties. The draw was held on 30 August 2016, 13:45 CEST, at the UEFA headquarters in Nyon, Switzerland. There were no seedings, but the 32 teams were split into four groups defined by sporting and geographical criteria prior to the draw.

- In the first round, teams in the same group were drawn against each other, with the order of legs decided by draw.
- In the second round, the 16 winners of the first round were divided into two groups: Group A contained the winners from Groups 1 and 2, while Group B contained the winners from Groups 3 and 4. Teams in the same group were drawn against each other, with the order of legs decided by draw.

Key to colours
Second round winners advanced to the play-offs

Group 1 Team (Spain) Málaga (Italy) Roma (Greece) PAOK (Cyprus) APOEL (Serbia) Čukarički (Slovenia) Domžale (Slovakia) Nitra (Hungary) Puskás Akadémia	Group 2 Team (Netherlands) Ajax (Belgium) Anderlecht (Denmark) Midtjylland (Sweden) AIK (Norway) Rosenborg (Finland) HJK (Iceland) Breiðablik (Republic of Ireland) Cork City	Group 3 Team (Switzerland) Zürich (Czech Republic) Sparta Prague (Romania) Viitorul Constanța (Austria) Red Bull Salzburg (Moldova) Sheriff Tiraspol (Bosnia and Herzegovina) Zrinjski Mostar (North Macedonia) Vardar (Montenegro) Mladost Podgorica	Group 4 Team (Russia) Dynamo Moscow (Turkey) Altınordu (Israel) Maccabi Haifa (Belarus) Shakhtyor Soligorsk (Bulgaria) Levski Sofia (Azerbaijan) Gabala (Kazakhstan) Kairat (Georgia (country)) Dinamo Tbilisi

== Format ==
In the Domestic Champions Path, each tie was played over two legs, with each team playing one leg at home. The team that scored more goals on aggregate over the two legs advanced to the next round. If the aggregate score was level, the away goals rule is applied, i.e., the team that scored more goals away from home over the two legs advances. If away goals were also equal, the match would be decided by a penalty shoot-out (no extra time is played).

The eight second round winners advanced to the play-offs, where they were joined by the eight group runners-up from the UEFA Champions League Path.

== First round ==
The first legs were played on 21, 27, 28, 29 September and 5 October, and the second legs were played on 19 October 2016.

=== Summary ===
Team 1	Agg.	Team 2	1st leg	2nd leg
Nitra (Slovakia)	2–8	(Spain) Málaga	2–3	0–5
Puskás Akadémia (Hungary)	1–1 (a)	(Greece) PAOK	1–1	0–0
APOEL (Cyprus)	1–9	(Italy) Roma	0–3	1–6
Domžale (Slovenia)	2–5	(Serbia) Čukarički	1–1	1–4
Breiðablik (Iceland)	0–7	(Netherlands) Ajax	0–3	0–4
HJK (Finland)	0–1	(Republic of Ireland) Cork City	0–0	0–1
Anderlecht (Belgium)	1–3	(Denmark) Midtjylland	0–0	1–3
Rosenborg (Norway)	3–1	(Sweden) AIK	0–0	3–1
Viitorul Constanța (Romania)	5–1	(Moldova) Sheriff Tiraspol	4–1	1–0
Zrinjski Mostar (Bosnia and Herzegovina)	0–9	(Switzerland) Zürich	0–3	0–6
Red Bull Salzburg (Austria)	8–0	(North Macedonia) Vardar	5–0	3–0
Sparta Prague (Czech Republic)	9–0	(Montenegro) Mladost Podgorica	4–0	5–0
Gabala (Azerbaijan)	0–7	(Russia) Dynamo Moscow	0–2	0–5
Maccabi Haifa (Israel)	8–2	(Belarus) Shakhtyor Soligorsk	5–0	3–2
Dinamo Tbilisi (Georgia (country))	1–8	(Kazakhstan) Kairat	0–3	1–5
Altınordu (Turkey)	6–1	(Bulgaria) Levski Sofia	5–0	1–1

=== Matches ===
28 September 2016
18:00

Nitra (Slovakia)	2–3	(Spain) Málaga
Balaj 14'; A. Fábry 57'	Report	Kuki 56', 87'; Boussefiane 90+2'

Štadión pod Zoborom, Nitra
Attendance: 4,600
Referee: Ferenc Karakó (Hungary)
19 October 2016
18:00

Málaga (Spain)	5–0	(Slovakia) Nitra
Ontiveros 27'; Kuki 44'; Arimany 58', 62'; Joni 90+1'	Report

La Rosaleda, Málaga
Attendance: 3,378
Referee: Laurent Kopriwa (Luxembourg)

Málaga won 8–2 on aggregate.

28 September 2016
18:00

Puskás Akadémia (Hungary)	1–1	(Greece) PAOK
Óvári 58'	Report	Stathopoulos 75'

Pancho Arena, Felcsút
Attendance: 629
Referee: Sergei Ivanov (Russia)
19 October 2016
17:00

PAOK (Greece)	0–0	(Hungary) Puskás Akadémia
	Report

Kaftanzoglio Stadium, Thessaloniki
Attendance: 718
Referee: Farrugia Cann Trustin (Malta)

1–1 on aggregate; PAOK won on away goals.

28 September 2016
15:00

APOEL (Cyprus)	0–3	(Italy) Roma
	Report	Tumminello 28', 29'; Spinozzi 78'

Makario Stadium, Nicosia
Attendance: 600
Referee: Stavros Mantalos (Greece)
19 October 2016
15:30

Roma (Italy)	6–1	(Cyprus) APOEL
Tumminello 22', 59', 90+1'; Soleri 42', 73'; Marcucci 83'	Report	Papakonstantinou 81'

Campo Agostino Di Bartolomei, Rome
Attendance: 350
Referee: Markus Hameter (Austria)

Roma won 9–1 on aggregate.

28 September 2016
18:00

Domžale (Slovenia)	1–1	(Serbia) Čukarički
Žužek 54'	Report	Šarić 63'

Domžale Sports Park, Domžale
Attendance: 1,500
Referee: Yaroslav Kozyk (Ukraine)
19 October 2016
18:00

Čukarički (Serbia)	4–1	(Slovenia) Domžale
Mašović 9'; Mehmedović 49' (pen.); Vidosavljević 73'; Šarić 89'	Report	Kene 82'

Čukarički Stadium, Belgrade
Attendance: 1,200
Referee: Irfan Peljto (Bosnia and Herzegovina)

Čukarički won 5–2 on aggregate.

28 September 2016
18:00

Breiðablik (Iceland)	0–3	(Netherlands) Ajax
	Report	Sierhuis 5'; De Ligt 25'; D. De Wit 69'

Kópavogsvöllur, Kópavogur
Attendance: 841
Referee: Alex Troleis (Faroe Islands)
19 October 2016
19:00

Ajax (Netherlands)	4–0	(Iceland) Breiðablik
Antonucci 9'; Sierhuis 13'; D. De Wit 40'; Kemper 82'	Report

Sportpark De Toekomst, Ouder-Amstel
Attendance: 528
Referee: Jens Maae (Denmark)

Ajax won 7–0 on aggregate.

28 September 2016
18:00

HJK (Finland)	0–0	(Republic of Ireland) Cork City
	Report

Sonera Stadium, Helsinki
Attendance: 321
Referee: Glenn Nyberg (Sweden)
19 October 2016
20:00

Cork City (Republic of Ireland)	1–0	(Finland) HJK
Drinan 47' (pen.)	Report

Turners Cross, Cork
Attendance: 1,287
Referee: Petur Reinert (Faroe Islands)

Cork City won 1–0 on aggregate.

27 September 2016
19:00

Anderlecht (Belgium)	0–0	(Denmark) Midtjylland
	Report

Constant Vanden Stock Stadium, Brussels
Attendance: 1,427
Referee: Danilo Grujić (Serbia)
19 October 2016
19:00

Midtjylland (Denmark)	3–1	(Belgium) Anderlecht
Vang 45'; Thychosen 65'; Torp 90+3'	Report	Bernier 72'

MCH Arena, Herning
Attendance: 1,661
Referee: Vladimir Vnuk (Slovakia)

Midtjylland won 3–1 on aggregate.

28 September 2016
18:00

Rosenborg (Norway)	0–0	(Sweden) AIK
	Report

Lerkendal Stadion, Trondheim
Attendance: 355
Referee: Jari Järvinen (Finland)
19 October 2016
18:00

AIK (Sweden)	1–3	(Norway) Rosenborg
Gravius 25' (pen.)	Report	Erlien 7', 17', 90+1'

Skytteholms IP, Solna
Attendance: 811
Referee: Roomer Tarajev (Estonia)

Rosenborg won 3–1 on aggregate.

28 September 2016
18:00

Viitorul Constanța (Romania)	4–1	(Moldova) Sheriff Tiraspol
Ciobanu 10', 65', 90+3'; Cicâldău 32'	Report	Căruntu 45' (pen.)

Central Stadium Hagi Academy, Ovidiu
Attendance: 270
Referee: Peter Kralović (Czech Republic)
19 October 2016
17:00

Sheriff Tiraspol (Moldova)	0–1	(Romania) Viitorul Constanța
	Report	Cicâldău 45+1' (pen.)

Malaya Sportivnaya Arena, Tiraspol
Attendance: 840
Referee: Dejan Jakimovski (Macedonia)

Viitorul Constanța won 5–1 on aggregate.

28 September 2016
18:00

Zrinjski Mostar (Bosnia and Herzegovina)	0–3	(Switzerland) Zürich
	Report	Rüegg 9', 76'; Aliu 33'

Stadion pod Bijelim Brijegom, Mostar
Attendance: 1,100
Referee: Mitja Žganec (Slovenia)
19 October 2016
17:00

Zürich (Switzerland)	6–0	(Bosnia and Herzegovina) Zrinjski Mostar
Domgjoni 20', 90+3'; Ribeiro 24', 68'; Kurtović 82'; Rexhepi 85'	Report

Utogrund, Zürich
Attendance: 459
Referee: Erik Lambrechts (Belgium)

Zürich won 9–0 on aggregate.

27 September 2016
18:00

Red Bull Salzburg (Austria)	5–0	(North Macedonia) Vardar
Haidara 21', 33'; Berisha 43', 88'; Schlager 66'	Report

Untersberg-Arena, Grödig
Attendance: 764
Referee: Fran Jović (Croatia)
19 October 2016
19:00

Vardar (North Macedonia)	0–3	(Austria) Red Bull Salzburg
	Report	Sturm 69'; Filip 84', 86'

Philip II Arena, Skopje
Attendance: 150
Referee: Suren Baliyan (Armenia)

Red Bull Salzburg won 8–0 on aggregate.

28 September 2016
14:00

Sparta Prague (Czech Republic)	4–0	(Montenegro) Mladost Podgorica
Mustedanagić 20', 45+2' (pen.); Scekic 45' (o.g.); Mareček 69'	Report

FK Viktoria Stadion, Prague
Attendance: 1,254
Referee: Filip Glova (Slovakia)
19 October 2016
13:30

Mladost Podgorica (Montenegro)	0–5	(Czech Republic) Sparta Prague
	Report	Fortelný 10'; Novotný 32', 49'; Mustedanagić 41'; Burda 58'

Podgorica City Stadium, Podgorica
Attendance: 375
Referee: Alexandru Tean (Moldova)

Sparta Prague won 9–0 on aggregate.

21 September 2016
17:00

Gabala (Azerbaijan)	0–2	(Russia) Dynamo Moscow
	Report	Kalugin 42'; Obolsky 48'

Gabala City Stadium, Qabala
Attendance: 800
Referee: Alper Ulusoy (Turkey)
19 October 2016
17:00

Dynamo Moscow (Russia)	5–0	(Azerbaijan) Gabala
Terekhov 29'; Obolsky 50', 73'; Grulyov 85'; Sedykh 89'	Report

Rodina Stadium, Khimki
Attendance: 72
Referee: Dumitri Muntean (Moldova)

Dynamo Moscow won 7–0 on aggregate.

5 October 2016
17:00

Maccabi Haifa (Israel)	5–0	(Belarus) Shakhtyor Soligorsk
Awaed 42', 68' (pen.), 74'; Zenati 71'; Bura 90+1'	Report

Sammy Ofer Stadium, Haifa
Attendance: 2,700
Referee: Alexandros Aretopoulos (Greece)
19 October 2016
18:00

Shakhtyor Soligorsk (Belarus)	2–3	(Israel) Maccabi Haifa
Lisakovich 68', 90' (pen.)	Report	Butbul 8'; Abu Fani 18'; Awaed 37'

Stroitel Stadium, Salihorsk
Attendance: 1,200
Referee: Oleksandr Derdo (Ukraine)

Maccabi Haifa won 8–2 on aggregate.

29 September 2016
18:00

Dinamo Tbilisi (Georgia (country))	0–3	(Kazakhstan) Kairat
	Report	Kotov 55'; Bakhtiyarov 60', 72'

Boris Paichadze Dinamo Arena, Tbilisi
Attendance: 2,680
Referee: Zaven Hovhannisyan (Moldova)
19 October 2016
15:00

Kairat (Kazakhstan)	5–1	(Georgia (country)) Dinamo Tbilisi
Bakhtiyarov 53'; Kotov 71' (pen.); Kharabadze 80' (o.g.); Popov 87'; Orazov 90+2'	Report	Chakvetadze 7'

Almaty Central Stadium, Almaty
Attendance: 2,000
Referee: Mikhail Vilkov (Russia)

Kairat won 8–1 on aggregate.

28 September 2016
17:00

Altınordu (Turkey)	5–0	(Bulgaria) Levski Sofia
Özfesli 33', 61'; Balakkiz 36'; Aktaş 50'; Durak 59'	Report

İzmir Atatürk Stadium, İzmir
Attendance: 2,320
Referee: Dumitri Muntean (Moldova)
19 October 2016
16:00

Levski Sofia (Bulgaria)	1–1	(Turkey) Altınordu
T. Dimitrov 41'	Report	M. Arslan 80'

Georgi Asparuhov Stadium, Sofia
Attendance: 300
Referee: Mario Zebec (Croatia)

Altınordu won 6–1 on aggregate.

== Second round ==
The first legs were played on 2, 9 and 16 November, and the second legs were played on 22, 23 and 30 November 2016.

=== Summary ===
Team 1	Agg.	Team 2	1st leg	2nd leg
PAOK (Greece)	1–4	(Netherlands) Ajax	0–2	1–2
Cork City (Republic of Ireland)	1–4 (Note: Order of legs reversed after original draw.)	(Italy) Roma	1–3	0–1
Málaga (Spain)	2–4	(Denmark) Midtjylland	2–0	0–4
Rosenborg (Norway)	2–1	(Serbia) Čukarički	0–1	2–0
Altınordu (Turkey)	8–5	(Czech Republic) Sparta Prague	6–2	2–3
Viitorul Constanța (Romania)	5–2	(Switzerland) Zürich	5–0	0–2
Maccabi Haifa (Israel)	1–1 (a)	(Russia) Dynamo Moscow	0–0	1–1
Red Bull Salzburg (Austria)	9–1	(Kazakhstan) Kairat	8–1	1–0

=== Matches ===
2 November 2016
14:00

PAOK (Greece)	0–2	(Netherlands) Ajax
	Report	Kluivert 24'; Sierhuis 75'

Kaftanzoglio Stadium, Thessaloniki
Attendance: 989
Referee: Kirill Levnikov (Russia)
22 November 2016
19:00

Ajax (Netherlands)	2–1	(Greece) PAOK
Sierhuis 73' (pen.), 75'	Report	Dimitriou 86'

Sportpark De Toekomst, Ouder-Amstel
Attendance: 521
Referee: Gunnar Jarl Jónsson (Iceland)

Ajax won 4–1 on aggregate.

2 November 2016
20:00

Cork City (Republic of Ireland)	1–3	(Italy) Roma
Drinan 20'	Report	Frattesi 10'; Soleri 86'; Franchi 90+3'

Turners Cross, Cork
Attendance: 3,015
Referee: Jørgen Burchardt (Denmark)
23 November 2016
15:00

Roma (Italy)	1–0	(Republic of Ireland) Cork City
Coly 61'	Report

Stadio Tre Fontane, Rome
Attendance: 1,550
Referee: Zbyněk Proske (Czech Republic)

Roma won 4–1 on aggregate.

2 November 2016
18:00

Málaga (Spain)	2–0	(Denmark) Midtjylland
Joni 78' (pen.); Mendes 90+5'	Report

Estadio Ciudad de Málaga, Málaga
Attendance: 3,500
Referee: Tiago Martins (Portugal)
23 November 2016
19:00

Midtjylland (Denmark)	4–0	(Spain) Málaga
Thychosen 7', 24'; Poulsen 85'; Vang 88'	Report

Arena Herning, Herning
Attendance: 1,024
Referee: Jari Järvinen (Finland)

Midtjylland won 4–2 on aggregate.

2 November 2016
18:00

Rosenborg (Norway)	0–1	(Serbia) Čukarički
	Report	S. Ilić 76'

Lerkendal Stadion, Trondheim
Attendance: 355
Referee: Glenn Nyberg (Sweden)
23 November 2016
18:00

Čukarički (Serbia)	0–2	(Norway) Rosenborg
	Report	Vinje 88' (pen.); Nordskag 90'

Čukarički Stadium, Belgrade
Attendance: 1,900
Referee: Alexandru Tean (Moldova)

Rosenborg won 2–1 on aggregate.

9 November 2016
14:00

Altınordu (Turkey)	6–2	(Czech Republic) Sparta Prague
Aktay 3', 23', 41', 47', 60'; Y. Arslan 90+5'	Report	Havelka 45'; Frýdek 82'

Bornova Stadyumu, İzmir
Attendance: 876
Referee: Ferenc Karakó (Hungary)
30 November 2016
15:00

Sparta Prague (Czech Republic)	3–2	(Turkey) Altınordu
Fortelný 55'; Köstl 66'; Mareček 78'	Report	Aktay 4'; Aktaş 89'

FK Viktoria Stadion, Prague
Attendance: 412
Referee: Mitja Žganec (Slovenia)

Altınordu won 8–5 on aggregate.

2 November 2016
17:00

Viitorul Constanța (Romania)	5–0	(Switzerland) Zürich
Casap 4'; C. Ene 39'; Coman 74' (pen.), 82'; Manole 89'	Report

Central Stadium Hagi Academy, Ovidiu
Attendance: 500
Referee: Farrugia Cann Trustin (Malta)
23 November 2016
17:00

Zürich (Switzerland)	2–0	(Romania) Viitorul Constanța
Ribeiro 14' (pen.); Xhemajli 19'	Report

Utogrund, Zürich
Attendance: 315
Referee: Mario Zebec (Croatia)

Viitorul Constanța won 5–2 on aggregate.

16 November 2016
16:00

Maccabi Haifa (Israel)	0–0	(Russia) Dynamo Moscow
	Report

Sammy Ofer Stadium, Haifa
Attendance: 3,500
Referee: Georgios Kyzas (Greece)
23 November 2016
11:30

Dynamo Moscow (Russia)	1–1	(Israel) Maccabi Haifa
Sedykh 55'	Report	Arad 64'

Rodina Stadium, Khimki
Attendance: 170
Referee: Dominik Ouschan (Austria)

1–1 on aggregate; Maccabi Haifa won on away goals.

2 November 2016
18:00

Red Bull Salzburg (Austria)	8–1	(Kazakhstan) Kairat
Wolf 16', 68', 79'; Berisha 24', 70', 80', 87', 90'	Report	Soltanov 55'

Red Bull Arena, Salzburg
Attendance: 623
Referee: Sascha Amhof (Switzerland)
23 November 2016
14:00

Kairat (Kazakhstan)	0–1	(Austria) Red Bull Salzburg
	Report	Meisl 17'

Almaty Central Stadium, Almaty
Attendance: 100
Referee: Giorgi Kruashvili (Georgia)

Red Bull Salzburg won 9–1 on aggregate.
