= 2016–17 in Croatian football =

Football in Croatia
- Season: 2016–17

Men's football
- Prva HNL: Rijeka
- Druga HNL: Rudeš
- Treća HNL: Vinogradar (West); Hajduk Split II (South); Međimurje (East)
- Croatian Cup: Rijeka

The following article presents a summary of the 2016–17 football season in Croatia, which will be the 26th season of competitive football in the country.

== National teams ==
=== Croatia ===
Date	Venue	Opponents	Score	Croatia scorer(s)	Report
UEFA Euro 2016 - Group stage
12 June 2016	Parc des Princes, Paris	Turkey	1–0	Modrić	UEFA.com
17 June 2016	Stade Geoffroy-Guichard, Saint-Étienne	Czech Republic	2–2	Perišić, Rakitić	UEFA.com
21 June 2016	Nouveau Stade de Bordeaux, Bordeaux	Spain	2–1	Kalinić, Perišić	UEFA.com
UEFA Euro 2016 - Knockout stage
25 June 2016	Stade Bollaert-Delelis, Lens	Portugal	0–1 (a.e.t.)		UEFA.com
2018 FIFA World Cup qualification - Group stage
5 September 2016	Stadion Maksimir, Zagreb	Turkey	1–1	Rakitić	UEFA.com
6 October 2016	Loro Boriçi Stadium, Shkodër	Kosovo	6–0	Mandžukić (3), Mitrović, Perišić, Kalinić	UEFA.com
9 October 2016	Tampere Stadium, Tampere	Finland	1–0	Mandžukić	UEFA.com
12 November 2016	Stadion Maksimir, Zagreb	Iceland	2–0	Brozović (2)	UEFA.com
24 March 2017	Stadion Maksimir, Zagreb	Ukraine	1–0	Kalinić	UEFA.com
11 June 2017	Laugardalsvöllur, Reykjavík	Iceland	0–1		UEFA.com
Friendly fixtures
15 November 2016	Windsor Park, Belfast	Northern Ireland	3–0	Mandžukić, Čop, Kramarić	HNS-CFF.hr
11 January 2017	Nanning, Guangxi	Chile	1–1 (1–4 p)	Andrijašević	HNS-CFF.hr
14 January 2017	Nanning, Guangxi	China	1–1 (3–4 p)	Ivanušec	HNS-CFF.hr
28 March 2017	A. Le Coq Arena, Tallinn	Estonia	0–3		HNS-CFF.hr
27 May 2017	L.A. Memorial Coliseum, Los Angeles	Mexico	2–1	Čop, Tudor	HNS-CFF.hr

=== Croatia U21 ===
Date	Venue	Opponents	Score	Croatia scorer(s)	Report
2017 UEFA European Under-21 Championship qualification - Group stage
1 September 2016	Gradski stadion, Koprivnica	Sweden	1–1	Perica	UEFA.com
6 September 2016	David Abashidze Stadium, Zestaponi	Georgia	2–2	Perica (2)	UEFA.com
10 October 2016	Vångavallen, Trelleborg	Sweden	2–4	Perica, Benković	UEFA.com

=== Croatia U19 ===
Date	Venue	Opponents	Score	Croatia scorer(s)	Report
2016 UEFA European Under-19 Championship - Group stage
12 July 2016	Donaustadion, Ulm	Netherlands	1–3	Brekalo	UEFA.com
15 July 2016	Städtisches Waldstadion, Aalen	France	0–2		UEFA.com
18 July 2016	Voith-Arena, Heidenheim	England	1–2	Moro	UEFA.com
2017 UEFA European Under-19 Championship qualification - Qualifying round
9 November 2016	FAM Training Camp, Podgorica	Cyprus	4–0	Lovren, Soldo, Majić, Majer	UEFA.com
11 November 2016	FAM Training Camp, Podgorica	Faroe Islands	5–0	Soldo, Brekalo, Kulenović, Gjira, Moro	UEFA.com
14 November 2016	Stadion pod Malim brdom, Petrovac	Montenegro	2–1	Špikić, Halilović	UEFA.com
2017 UEFA European Under-19 Championship qualification - Elite round
23 March 2017	Estádio da Mata Real, Paços de Ferreira	Portugal	1–2	Ivanušec	UEFA.com
25 March 2017	Estádio dos Arcos, Vila do Conde	Poland	2–0	Kalaica, Brekalo	UEFA.com
28 March 2017	Estádio Dr. Machado de Matos, Felgueiras	Turkey	0–0		UEFA.com

=== Croatia U17 ===
Date	Venue	Opponents	Score	Croatia scorer(s)	Report
2017 UEFA European Under-17 Championship - Group stage
3 May 2017	Stadion Rujevica, Rijeka	Italy	0–1		UEFA.com
6 May 2017	Stadion Rujevica, Rijeka	Turkey	1–4	Marin	UEFA.com
9 May 2017	Stadion Rujevica, Rijeka	Spain	1–1	Čolina	UEFA.com

=== Croatia Women's ===
Date	Venue	Opponents	Score	Croatia scorer(s)	Report
UEFA Women's Euro 2017 qualifying - Group stage
20 September 2016	Arena Khimki, Khimki	Russia	0–5		UEFA.com

== League tables ==
=== Croatian First Football League ===
Pos	Team	Pld	W	D	L	GF	GA	GD	Pts	Qualification or relegation
1	Rijeka (C)	36	27	7	2	71	23	+48	88	Qualification to Champions League second qualifying round
2	Dinamo Zagreb	36	27	5	4	68	24	+44	86	Qualification to Europa League third qualifying round (Note: Since winners of 2016–17 Croatian Football Cup, Rijeka, qualified for Champions League, the spot awarded to the cup winner (Europa League third qualifying round) was passed to the runners-up and all other spots were adjusted accordingly.)
3	Hajduk Split	36	20	9	7	70	31	+39	69	Qualification to Europa League second qualifying round
4	Osijek	36	20	6	10	52	37	+15	66	Qualification to Europa League first qualifying round
5	Lokomotiva	36	12	8	16	41	38	+3	44	
6	Istra 1961	36	10	9	17	33	49	−16	39	
7	Slaven Belupo	36	9	11	16	36	45	−9	38	
8	Inter Zaprešić	36	5	13	18	26	57	−31	28	
9	Cibalia (O)	36	4	9	23	26	79	−53	21	Qualification to Relegation play-offs
10	RNK Split (R)	36	3	9	24	12	52	−40	18	Relegation to Croatian Third Football League

Source: Prva HNL (in Croatian), Soccerway
Rules for classification: 1) Points; 2) Head-to-head points; 3) Head-to-head goal difference; 4) Head-to-head goals scored (away goals if tied); 5) Goal difference; 6) Goals scored; 7) Play-off
(Note: Criteria 2-4 and 7 is only used if deciding Champion, teams to international competition or teams for relegation and in that case criteria 6 will not be used).
(C) Champions; (O) Play-off winners; (R) Relegated

=== Croatian Second Football League ===
Pos	Team	Pld	W	D	L	GF	GA	GD	Pts	Qualification or relegation
1	Rudeš (C, P)	33	17	9	7	43	27	+16	60	Promotion to the Croatian First Football League
2	Gorica	33	15	12	6	53	31	+22	57	Qualification to the promotion play-off
3	Solin	33	16	7	10	40	36	+4	55	
4	Sesvete	33	15	7	11	53	36	+17	52	
5	Dinamo Zagreb II	33	12	11	10	39	32	+7	47	Reserve teams are ineligible for promotion to the Croatian First Football League
6	Dugopolje	33	12	10	11	36	32	+4	46	
7	Šibenik	33	12	9	12	32	33	−1	45	
8	Novigrad	33	11	9	13	28	35	−7	42	
9	Lučko	33	9	11	13	34	48	−14	38	
10	Hrvatski Dragovoljac	33	9	9	15	30	39	−9	36	Relegation to the Croatian Third Football League
11	Imotski (R)	33	8	7	18	36	58	−22	31	Relegation to the Croatian Third Football League
12	NK Zagreb (R)	33	6	11	16	34	50	−16	29	Relegation to the Croatian Third Football League

Source: Druga-HNL.com
Rules for classification: 1) Points; 2) Head-to-head points; 3) Head-to-head goal difference; 4) Head-to-head away goals scored
(C) Champions; (P) Promoted; (R) Relegated

== Croatian clubs in Europe ==
=== Summary ===
Club	Competition	Starting round	Final round	Matches played
Dinamo Zagreb	Champions League	2nd qualifying round	Group stage	12
Rijeka	Europa League	3rd qualifying round		2
Hajduk Split	Europa League	2nd qualifying round	Play-off round	6
Lokomotiva	Europa League	1st qualifying round	Play-off round	8
Osijek	Women's Champions League	Qualifying round		3
Dinamo Zagreb U19	UEFA Youth League	Group stage		6

=== Dinamo Zagreb ===
Date	Venue	Opponents	Score	Dinamo Zagreb scorer(s)	Report
2016–17 Champions League - Second qualifying round
12 July 2016	Philip II Arena, Skopje	(North Macedonia) Vardar	2–1	Mijušković (o.g.), Rog	UEFA.com
20 July 2016	Stadion Maksimir, Zagreb	(North Macedonia) Vardar	3–2	Pjaca (2), Machado	UEFA.com
2016–17 Champions League - Third qualifying round
26 July 2016	Stadion Maksimir, Zagreb	(Georgia (country)) Dinamo Tbilisi	2–0	Soudani, Ćorić	UEFA.com
2 August 2016	Boris Paichadze Dinamo Arena, Tbilisi	(Georgia (country)) Dinamo Tbilisi	1–0	Rog	UEFA.com
2016–17 Champions League - Play-off round
16 August 2016	Stadion Maksimir, Zagreb	(Austria) Red Bull Salzburg	1–1	Rog	UEFA.com
24 August 2016	Red Bull Arena, Wals-Siezenheim	(Austria) Red Bull Salzburg	2–1 (a.e.t.)	Fernandes, Soudani	UEFA.com
2016–17 Champions League - Group stage
14 September 2016	Parc Olympique Lyonnais, Décines-Charpieu	(France) Lyon	0–3		UEFA.com
27 September 2016	Stadion Maksimir, Zagreb	(Italy) Juventus	0–4		UEFA.com
18 October 2016	Stadion Maksimir, Zagreb	(Spain) Sevilla	0–1		UEFA.com
2 November 2016	Ramón Sánchez Pizjuán Stadium, Seville	(Spain) Sevilla	0–4		UEFA.com
22 November 2016	Stadion Maksimir, Zagreb	(France) Lyon	0–1		UEFA.com
7 December 2016	Juventus Stadium, Turin	(Italy) Juventus	0–2		UEFA.com

=== Rijeka ===
Date	Venue	Opponents	Score	Rijeka scorer(s)	Report
2016–17 Europa League - Third qualifying round
28 July 2016	Başakşehir Fatih Terim Stadium, Istanbul	(Turkey) İstanbul Başakşehir	0–0		UEFA.com
4 August 2016	Stadion Rujevica, Rijeka	(Turkey) İstanbul Başakşehir	2–2	Bezjak (2)	UEFA.com

=== Hajduk Split ===
Date	Venue	Opponents	Score	Hajduk Split scorer(s)	Report
2016–17 Europa League - Second qualifying round
14 July 2016	Stadionul Emil Alexandrescu, Iași	(Romania) CSMS Iași	2–2	Ohandza, Said	UEFA.com
21 July 2016	Stadion Poljud, Split	(Romania) CSMS Iași	2–1	Tudor, Ohandza	UEFA.com
2016–17 Europa League - Third qualifying round
28 July 2016	CSC Nika Stadium, Oleksandriia	(Ukraine) FC Oleksandriya	3–0	Ćosić, Erceg, Ohandza	UEFA.com
4 August 2016	Stadion Poljud, Split	(Ukraine) FC Oleksandriya	3–1	Nižić, Sušić (2)	UEFA.com
2016–17 Europa League - Play-off round
18 August 2016	Netanya Stadium, Netanya	(Israel) Maccabi Tel Aviv	1–2	Said	UEFA.com
25 August 2016	Stadion Poljud, Split	(Israel) Maccabi Tel Aviv	2–1 (3–4 p)	Ćosić (2)	UEFA.com

=== Lokomotiva ===
Date	Venue	Opponents	Score	Lokomotiva scorer(s)	Report
2016–17 Europa League - First qualifying round
30 June 2016	Estadi Comunal, Andorra la Vella	(Andorra) UE Santa Coloma	3–1	Marić (2), Prenga	UEFA.com
7 July 2016	Stadion Kranjčevićeva, Zagreb	(Andorra) UE Santa Coloma	4–1	Ćorić, Prenga, Marić, Perić	UEFA.com
2016–17 Europa League - Second qualifying round
14 July 2016	Rovaniemen keskuskenttä, Rovaniemi	(Finland) RoPS	1–1	Jammeh (o.g.)	UEFA.com
21 July 2016	Stadion Kranjčevićeva, Zagreb	(Finland) RoPS	3–0	Fiolić, Marić (2)	UEFA.com
2016–17 Europa League - Third qualifying round
28 July 2016	Stadion Kranjčevićeva, Zagreb	(Ukraine) Vorskla Poltava	0–0		UEFA.com
4 August 2016	Oleksiy Butovskyi Vorskla Stadium, Poltava	(Ukraine) Vorskla Poltava	3–2	Bočkaj, Fiolić, Perić	UEFA.com
2016–17 Europa League - Play-off round
18 August 2016	Stadion Maksimir, Zagreb	(Belgium) Genk	2–2	Marić, Fiolić	UEFA.com
25 August 2016	Cristal Arena, Genk	(Belgium) Genk	0–2		UEFA.com

=== ŽNK Osijek ===
Date	Venue	Opponents	Score	ŽNK Osijek scorer(s)	Report
2016–17 UEFA Women's Champions League - Qualifying round
23 August 2016	Stadion Gradski vrt, Osijek	(North Macedonia) ŽFK Dragon 2014	14–1	Trpeska (o.g.), Culek, Joščak (4), Šalek (5), Bojčić, Andrlić (2)	UEFA.com
25 August 2016	Stadion Gradski vrt, Osijek	(Belarus) FC Minsk	0–5		UEFA.com
28 August 2016	Stadion Gradski vrt, Osijek	(Belgium) Standard Liège	1–1	Kunštek	UEFA.com

=== Dinamo Zagreb U19 ===
Date	Venue	Opponents	Score	Dinamo Zagreb U19 scorer(s)	Report
2016–17 UEFA Youth League - Group stage
14 September 2016	Groupama Academy Stadium, Décines	(France) Lyon	0–2		UEFA.com
27 September 2016	Stadion Hitrec-Kacian, Zagreb	(Italy) Juventus	2–1	Božić (2)	UEFA.com
18 October 2016	Stadion Hitrec-Kacian, Zagreb	(Spain) Sevilla	2–4	Božić (2)	UEFA.com
2 November 2016	Felipe Del Valle, La Rinconada	(Spain) Sevilla	1–1	Božić	UEFA.com
22 November 2016	Stadion Hitrec-Kacian, Zagreb	(France) Lyon	1–2	Špikić	UEFA.com
7 December 2016	Juventus Stadium, Turin	(Italy) Juventus	1–0	Đurić	UEFA.com
