= 2016–17 UEFA Youth League knockout phase =

International football tournament

The 2016–17 UEFA Youth League knockout phase began on 7 February 2017 and concluded on 24 April 2017 with the final at Colovray Stadium in Nyon, Switzerland, to decide the champions of the 2016–17 UEFA Youth League. A total of 24 teams competed in the knockout phase.

Times up to 25 March 2017 (knockout round play-offs, round of 16 and quarter-finals) are CET (UTC+1), thereafter times (semi-finals and final) are CEST (UTC+2).

== Round and draw dates ==
The schedule of the knockout phase was as follows (all draws were held at the UEFA headquarters in Nyon, Switzerland).

| Round | Draw | Match dates |
|---|---|---|
| Knockout round play-offs | 12 December 2016 | 7–8 February 2017 |
| Round of 16 | 10 February 2017 | 21–22 February 2017 |
| Quarter-finals | 10 February 2017 | 7–8 March 2017 |
| Semi-finals | 10 February 2017 | 21 April 2017 at Colovray Stadium, Nyon |
| Final | 10 February 2017 | 24 April 2017 at Colovray Stadium, Nyon |

== Format ==
The knockout phase involved 24 teams: 16 teams which qualified from the UEFA Champions League Path (eight group winners and eight group runners-up), and eight teams which qualified from the Domestic Champions Path (eight second round winners):

- The eight group winners from the UEFA Champions League Path entered the round of 16.
- The eight group runners-up from the UEFA Champions League Path and the eight second round winners from the Domestic Champions Path entered the knockout round play-offs. The eight play-off winners advanced to the round of 16.

Each tie in the knockout phase was played over one match. If the scores were level after full-time, the match was decided by a penalty shoot-out (no extra time was played).

The mechanism of the draws for each round was as follows:

- In the draw for the knockout round play-offs, the eight second round winners from the Domestic Champions Path were drawn against the eight group runners-up from the UEFA Champions League Path, with the teams from the Domestic Champions Path hosting the match. Teams from the same association could not be drawn against each other.
- In the draw for the round of 16, the eight group winners from the UEFA Champions League Path were drawn against the eight play-off winners. Teams from the same UEFA Champions League Path group could not be drawn against each other, but teams from the same association could be drawn against each other. The draw also decided the home team for each round of 16 match.
- In the draws for the quarter-finals onwards, there were no seedings, and teams from the same UEFA Champions League Path group or the same association could be drawn against each other. The draws also decided the home team for each quarter-final, and the "home" team for administrative purposes for each semi-final and final (which were played at a neutral venue).

On 17 July 2014, the UEFA emergency panel ruled that Ukrainian and Russian clubs would not be drawn against each other "until further notice" due to the political unrest between the countries. This restriction, if necessary, applied to the draws for the knockout round play-offs, round of 16 and quarter-finals (should such meeting be possible given that the identity of the quarter-finalists were not known at the time of the draw), where matches were hosted by one of the teams, but not to the semi-finals and final, which were played at a neutral venue.

== Qualified teams ==
=== UEFA Champions League Path ===
| Group | Winners (enter round of 16) | Runners-up (enter play-offs as away team) |
|---|---|---|
| A | (France) Paris Saint-Germain | (Switzerland) Basel |
| B | (Ukraine) Dynamo Kyiv | (Portugal) Benfica |
| C | (Spain) Barcelona | (England) Manchester City |
| D | (Netherlands) PSV Eindhoven | (Spain) Atlético Madrid |
| E | (Russia) CSKA Moscow | (France) Monaco |
| F | (Spain) Real Madrid | (Germany) Borussia Dortmund |
| G | (Portugal) Porto | (Denmark) Copenhagen |
| H | (Spain) Sevilla | (Italy) Juventus |

=== Domestic Champions Path ===
Second round winners
(enter play-offs as home team)
(Netherlands) Ajax
(Italy) Roma
(Denmark) Midtjylland
(Norway) Rosenborg
(Turkey) Altınordu
(Romania) Viitorul Constanța
(Israel) Maccabi Haifa
(Austria) Red Bull Salzburg

== Bracket ==
The draw for the round of 16 onwards was held on 10 February 2017, 13:00 CET, at the UEFA headquarters in Nyon, Switzerland.

Knockout round play-offs
(Italy) Roma | 1
(France) Monaco | 2
(Netherlands) Ajax | 2
(Italy) Juventus | 0
(Norway) Rosenborg | 1
(Switzerland) Basel | 0
(Denmark) Midtjylland | 1 (5)
(Portugal) Benfica (p) | 1 (6)
(Israel) Maccabi Haifa | 0
(Germany) Borussia Dortmund | 1
(Romania) Viitorul Constanța | 4
(Denmark) Copenhagen | 2
(Austria) Red Bull Salzburg (p) | 1 (4)
(England) Manchester City | 1 (3)
(Turkey) Altınordu | 0
(Spain) Atlético Madrid | 2

Round of 16
(France) Monaco | 3
(Spain) Real Madrid | 4
(Netherlands) Ajax | 3
(Ukraine) Dynamo Kyiv | 0
(Russia) CSKA Moscow | 2
(Norway) Rosenborg | 1
(Netherlands) PSV Eindhoven | 1 (4)
(Portugal) Benfica (p) | 1 (5)
(Spain) Barcelona | 4
(Germany) Borussia Dortmund | 1
(Portugal) Porto | 3
(Romania) Viitorul Constanța | 0
(Austria) Red Bull Salzburg | 5
(France) Paris Saint-Germain | 0
(Spain) Atlético Madrid | 3
(Spain) Sevilla | 2

Quarter-finals
(Spain) Real Madrid | 2
(Netherlands) Ajax | 1
(Russia) CSKA Moscow | 0
(Portugal) Benfica | 2
(Spain) Barcelona | 2
(Portugal) Porto | 1
(Austria) Red Bull Salzburg | 2
(Spain) Atlético Madrid | 1

Semi-finals
21 April – Nyon
(Spain) Real Madrid | 2
(Portugal) Benfica | 4
21 April – Nyon
(Spain) Barcelona | 1
(Austria) Red Bull Salzburg | 2

Final
24 April – Nyon
(Portugal) Benfica | 1
(Austria) Red Bull Salzburg | 2

== Knockout round play-offs ==
The draw for the knockout round play-offs was held on 12 December 2016, 14:00 CET, at the UEFA headquarters in Nyon, Switzerland.

=== Summary ===
The matches were played on 7 and 8 February 2017.

| Home team | Score | Away team |
|---|---|---|
| Red Bull Salzburg (Austria) | 1–1 (4–3 p) | (England) Manchester City |
| Midtjylland (Denmark) | 1–1 (5–6 p) | (Portugal) Benfica |
| Viitorul Constanța (Romania) | 4–2 | (Denmark) Copenhagen |
| Roma (Italy) | 1–2 | (France) Monaco |
| Rosenborg (Norway) | 1–0 | (Switzerland) Basel |
| Altınordu (Turkey) | 0–2 | (Spain) Atlético Madrid |
| Maccabi Haifa (Israel) | 0–1 | (Germany) Borussia Dortmund |
| Ajax (Netherlands) | 2–0 | (Italy) Juventus |

=== Matches ===
8 February 2017
18:00

| Red Bull Salzburg (Austria) | 1–1 | (England) Manchester City |
|---|---|---|
| Wolf 12' | Report | Nmecha 30' |
Penalties
| Igor (penalty missed); Wolf (penalty scored); Meisl (penalty scored); Meister (penalty scored); Berisha (penalty scored) | 4–3 | (penalty scored) Nmecha; (penalty scored) Adarabioyo; (penalty scored) Sancho; (penalty missed) Brahim; (penalty missed) Fernandes |

Stadion Salzburg, Wals-Siezenheim
Attendance: 1,890
Referee: Kristo Tohver (Estonia)

7 February 2017
16:00

| Midtjylland (Denmark) | 1–1 | (Portugal) Benfica |
|---|---|---|
| Torp 84' | Report | Gonçalves 42' |
Penalties
| Vang (penalty scored); Olsen (penalty missed); Thychosen (penalty scored); Torp (penalty scored); Essaisi (penalty scored); Kirk (penalty scored); Nicolaisen (penalty missed) | 5–6 | (penalty scored) Dias; (penalty missed) Álvaro; (penalty scored) Fernandes; (penalty scored) Mendes; (penalty scored) Gomes; (penalty scored) Buta; (penalty scored) Gonçalves |

MCH Arena, Herning
Attendance: 1,612
Referee: Svein-Erik Edvartsen (Norway)

8 February 2017
16:00

| Viitorul Constanța (Romania) | 4–2 | (Denmark) Copenhagen |
|---|---|---|
| Casap 32', 83'; C. Ene 67'; Coman 79' | Report | Holse 35'; Wind 90+2' |

Central Stadium Hagi Academy, Ovidiu
Attendance: 200
Referee: Sergei Lapochkin (Russia)

8 February 2017
14:00

| Roma (Italy) | 1–2 | (France) Monaco |
|---|---|---|
| Grossi 12' | Report | Bongiovanni 56' (pen.); Sylla 58' |

Stadio Tre Fontane, Rome
Attendance: 1,379
Referee: Roi Reinshreiber (Israel)

8 February 2017
18:00

| Rosenborg (Norway) | 1–0 | (Switzerland) Basel |
|---|---|---|
| Solli 76' | Report |

Lerkendal Stadion Training Ground, Trondheim
Attendance: 273
Referee: Thorvaldur Árnason (Iceland)

8 February 2017
16:00

| Altınordu (Turkey) | 0–2 | (Spain) Atlético Madrid |
|---|---|---|
| | Report | Moya 12' (pen.); De Castro 90' |

Bornova Stadyumu, İzmir
Attendance: 3,700
Referee: Anatoliy Zhabchenko (Ukraine)

7 February 2017
16:30

| Maccabi Haifa (Israel) | 0–1 | (Germany) Borussia Dortmund |
|---|---|---|
| | Report | Schwermann 60' |

Sammy Ofer Stadium, Haifa
Attendance: 10,124
Referee: Stephan Klossner (Switzerland)

7 February 2017
18:00

| Ajax (Netherlands) | 2–0 | (Italy) Juventus |
|---|---|---|
| Eiting 44'; Sierhuis 48' | Report |

Sportpark De Toekomst, Ouder-Amstel
Attendance: 2,554
Referee: Bojan Pandžić (Sweden)

== Round of 16 ==
=== Summary ===
The round of 16 matches were played on 21 and 22 February 2017.

| Home team | Score | Away team |
|---|---|---|
| CSKA Moscow (Russia) | 2–1 | (Norway) Rosenborg |
| Atlético Madrid (Spain) | 3–2 | (Spain) Sevilla |
| Barcelona (Spain) | 4–1 | (Germany) Borussia Dortmund |
| Ajax (Netherlands) | 3–0 | (Ukraine) Dynamo Kyiv |
| Monaco (France) | 3–4 | (Spain) Real Madrid |
| Red Bull Salzburg (Austria) | 5–0 | (France) Paris Saint-Germain |
| PSV Eindhoven (Netherlands) | 1–1 (4–5 p) | (Portugal) Benfica |
| Porto (Portugal) | 3–0 | (Romania) Viitorul Constanța |

=== Matches ===
22 February 2017
12:00

| CSKA Moscow (Russia) | 2–1 | (Norway) Rosenborg |
|---|---|---|
| Zhamaletdinov 26'; Pukhov 89' (pen.) | Report | Vinje 36' (pen.) |

Oktyabr Stadium Artificial Turf, Moscow
Attendance: 350
Referee: Mete Kalkavan (Turkey)

21 February 2017
16:00

| Atlético Madrid (Spain) | 3–2 | (Spain) Sevilla |
|---|---|---|
| Acosta 13'; Salomón 63'; Clemente Mues 86' | Report | Amo 57' (pen.), 83' (pen.) |

Cerro del Espino, Majadahonda
Attendance: 630
Referee: Benoît Millot (France)

22 February 2017
18:00

| Barcelona (Spain) | 4–1 | (Germany) Borussia Dortmund |
|---|---|---|
| Pérez 41'; Ruiz 51'; Lee 62'; Mboula 68' | Report | Wanner 6' |

Mini Estadi, Barcelona
Attendance: 1,660
Referee: Alexander Harkam (Austria)

21 February 2017
18:00

| Ajax (Netherlands) | 3–0 | (Ukraine) Dynamo Kyiv |
|---|---|---|
| Sierhuis 11', 87'; D. de Wit 62' | Report |

Sportpark De Toekomst, Ouder-Amstel
Attendance: 2,401
Referee: Alejandro Hernández (Spain)

22 February 2017
16:00

| Monaco (France) | 3–4 | (Spain) Real Madrid |
|---|---|---|
| Cardona 24' (pen.); Mbaé 33'; Bongiovanni 90+4' | Report | Peeters 57', 90'; Díaz 67' (pen.); Gómez 71' |

Stade Louis II, Monaco
Attendance: 1,300
Referee: Christian Dingert (Germany)

21 February 2017
18:00

| Red Bull Salzburg (Austria) | 5–0 | (France) Paris Saint-Germain |
|---|---|---|
| Wolf 15'; Filip 31', 34', 61'; Mensah 73' | Report |

Stadion Salzburg, Wals-Siezenheim
Attendance: 3,037
Referee: Sandro Schärer (Switzerland)

21 February 2017
18:00

| PSV Eindhoven (Netherlands) | 1–1 | (Portugal) Benfica |
|---|---|---|
| Piroe 44' | Report | Félix 47' |
Penalties
| Rigo (penalty scored); Sadílek (penalty scored); Lammers (penalty scored); Soulas (penalty scored); Piroe (penalty missed); Konings (penalty missed) | 4–5 | (penalty scored) Dias; (penalty scored) Gonçalves; (penalty scored) Fernandes; (penalty missed) Mendes; (penalty scored) Gomes; (penalty scored) Buta |

Philips Stadion, Eindhoven
Attendance: 4,500
Referee: Radu Petrescu (Romania)

21 February 2017
15:00

| Porto (Portugal) | 3–0 | (Romania) Viitorul Constanța |
|---|---|---|
| Abou 54'; Rui Pedro 69'; Queta 90+1' | Report |

CTFD PortoGaia, Vila Nova de Gaia
Attendance: 308
Referee: Kevin Clancy (Scotland)

== Quarter-finals ==
=== Summary ===
The quarter-finals were played on 7 and 8 March 2017.

| Home team | Score | Away team |
|---|---|---|
| Real Madrid (Spain) | 2–1 | (Netherlands) Ajax |
| CSKA Moscow (Russia) | 0–2 | (Portugal) Benfica |
| Barcelona (Spain) | 2–1 | (Portugal) Porto |
| Red Bull Salzburg (Austria) | 2–1 | (Spain) Atlético Madrid |

=== Matches ===
8 March 2017
16:00

| Real Madrid (Spain) | 2–1 | (Netherlands) Ajax |
|---|---|---|
| Gómez 5'; Martín 78' (pen.) | Report | Lang 66' |

Alfredo di Stéfano, Madrid
Attendance: 830
Referee: Marco Guida (Italy)

7 March 2017
14:00

| CSKA Moscow (Russia) | 0–2 | (Portugal) Benfica |
|---|---|---|
| | Report | Gonçalves 16'; Leonov 47' (o.g.) |

Oktyabr Stadium Artificial Turf, Moscow
Attendance: 400
Referee: Aliyar Aghayev (Azerbaijan)

7 March 2017
18:00

| Barcelona (Spain) | 2–1 | (Portugal) Porto |
|---|---|---|
| Ruiz 75'; Mboula 87' (pen.) | Report | Bruno Costa 62' |

Mini Estadi, Barcelona
Attendance: 2,133
Referee: Bart Vertenten (Belgium)

7 March 2017
16:00

| Red Bull Salzburg (Austria) | 2–1 | (Spain) Atlético Madrid |
|---|---|---|
| Igor 48'; Wolf 61' | Report | Navarro 79' |

Stadion Salzburg, Wals-Siezenheim
Attendance: 5,380
Referee: Bastian Dankert (Germany)

== Semi-finals ==
=== Summary ===
The semi-finals were played on 21 April 2017 at Colovray Stadium, Nyon.

| Team 1 | Score | Team 2 |
|---|---|---|
| Real Madrid (Spain) | 2–4 | (Portugal) Benfica |
| Barcelona (Spain) | 1–2 | (Austria) Red Bull Salzburg |

=== Matches ===
21 April 2017
17:00

| Real Madrid (Spain) | 2–4 | (Portugal) Benfica |
|---|---|---|
| Gómez 28'; Seoane 55' | Report | Félix 5', 19'; Filipe 17', 90+6' |

Colovray Stadium, Nyon
Attendance: 4,000
Referee: Bartosz Frankowski (Poland)

21 April 2017
13:00

| Barcelona (Spain) | 1–2 | (Austria) Red Bull Salzburg |
|---|---|---|
| Mboula 19' | Report | Wolf 63'; Daka 84' |

Colovray Stadium, Nyon
Attendance: 3,870
Referee: Andris Treimanis (Latvia)

== Final ==
The final was played on 24 April 2017 at Colovray Stadium, Nyon.

24 April 2017
17:00

| Benfica (Portugal) | 1–2 | (Austria) Red Bull Salzburg |
|---|---|---|
| Gomes 29' | Report | Daka 72'; Schmidt 76' |

Colovray Stadium, Nyon
Attendance: 4,000
Referee: Ali Palabıyık (Turkey)
