= Tartaglione =

Tartaglione (Italian: [tartaʎˈʎone], meaning "stutterer") is an Italian surname. Notable people with this surname include:

- Antonio Tartaglione (born 1998), Italian footballer
- Christine Tartaglione (born 1960), Democratic member of the Pennsylvania State Senate for the 2nd District
- John Tartaglione (1921–2003), American comic book artist
- Margaret Tartaglione (1933–2019), Philadelphia City Commissioner through January 2012, mother of Christine Tartaglione
- Nicholas Tartaglione (born 1967), American former police officer and cell mate of Jeffrey Epstein
