= Preslav Petrov =

Preslav Petrov may refer to:

- Preslav Petrov (footballer, born 1995), Bulgarian defender for PFC Dunav Ruse and formerly for PFC Ludogorets Razgrad
- Preslav Petrov (footballer, born 1997), Bulgarian defender for PFC Ludogorets Razgrad
