= Emanuele Spinozzi =

Italian footballer (born 1998)

Personal information
- Date of birth: 23 July 1998 (age 28)
- Place of birth: Rome, Italy
- Height: 1.78 m (5 ft 10 in)
- Position: Midfielder

Team information
- Current team: Lodigiani
- Number: 16

Youth career
- –2017: Roma

Senior career*
Years	Team	Apps	(Gls)
2016–2019	Roma	0	(0)
2017–2018	→ Pontedera (loan)	29	(1)
2018–2019	→ Piacenza (loan)	6	(0)
2019	→ Teramo (loan)	10	(0)
2019–2021	Pistoiese	56	(0)
2021–2022	Latina	6	(0)
2022–2023	Vis Artena	29	(2)
2023	Gladiator	11	(0)
2023–2024	Roma City	11	(0)
2024–	Lodigiani	28	(2)

International career
2013	Italy U16	2	(0)
2015–2016	Italy U18	3	(0)
- * Club domestic league appearances and goals as of 21 February 2026

Emanuele Spinozzi (born 23 July 1998) is an Italian footballer who plays as a midfielder for Serie D club Lodigiani.

== Club career ==
=== Roma ===
Born in Rome, Spinozzi was a youth exponent of Roma.

==== Loan to Pontedera ====
On 1 July 2017, Spinozzi was signed by Serie C side Pontedera on a season-long loan deal. On 3 September he made his Serie C debut for Pontedera as a substitute replacing Riccardo Mastrilli in the 71st minute of a 1–0 away defeat against Lucchese. One week later, on 10 September, he played his first entire match for Pontedera, a 1–1 home draw against Giana Erminio. Three months later, on 10 December, Spinozzi scored his first professional goal and the winning goal of the match in the 62nd minute of a 1–0 away win over Prato. Spinozzi ended his season-long loan to Pontedera with 30 appearances, including 23 as a starter, and 1 goal.

==== Loan to Piacenza and Teramo ====
On 20 July 2018, Spinozzi was loaned to Serie C club Piacenza on a season-long loan deal. On 30 September he made his Serie C debut for Piacenza as a substitute replacing Alessio Sestu in the 88th minute of a 3–0 home win over Pisa. Two weeks later, on 14 October, Spinozzi played his first match as a starter, a 1–1 away draw against Albissola, he was replaced after 79 minutes by Jacopo Silva. His loan was terminated during the 2018–19 season winter break and Spinozzi returned to Roma leaving Piacenza with only 6 appearances, including only 1 as a starter, however he remained an unused substitute 16 times during this loan.

On 30 January 2019, Spinozzi was loaned to Teramo on a 6-month loan. Ten days later, on 9 February, he made his debut for the club as a substitute replacing Lorenzo De Grazia in the 80th minute of a 1–0 home win over Rimini. Two weeks later, on 23 February, Spinozzi played his first match as a starter for the club, a 3–1 away win over Ravenna, he was replaced after 60 minutes by Lorenzo De Grazia. On 24 March he played his first entire match for Teramo, a 2–1 away win over Giana Erminio. Spinozzi ended his loan with 10 appearances, including 7 as a starter.

=== Pistoiese ===
On 21 August 2019, Spinozzi joined to Serie C club Pistoiese on an undisclosed fee and he signed a 2-year contract. Four days later, on 25 August, he made his debut for the club as a substitute replacing Antonio Tartaglione in the 46th minute of a 2–1 home defeat against AlbinoLeffe. On 21 September, Spinozzi played his first match as a stater for Pistoiese, a 1–1 home draw against Como, he was replaced by Alessandro Bordin in the 80th minute. Four days later, on 25 September, he played his first entire match for the club, a 0–0 home draw against Renate. However at the end of 2020–21 season Pistoiese was relegated in Serie D, but it was returned to Serie C due to other clubs dropping out for the 2021–22 season.

=== Latina ===
On 19 August 2021, Spinozzi signed a one-year contract with Latina in Serie C. After starting the first four league games, he was moved to the bench. In early November, he underwent surgery to repair an ACL tear he suffered in training and his recovery was estimated to take six months.

=== Vis Artena ===
On 26 July 2022, Spinozzi signed with Vis Artena in Serie D, reuniting with manager Agenore Maurizi, who previously coached him at Teramo.

== International career ==
Spinozzi represented Italy at under-16 and under-18 level.

== Career statistics ==
As of match played 16 April 2022

Club	Season	League			Cup		Europe		Other		Total	
Club	Season	League	Apps	Goals	Apps	Goals	Apps	Goals	Apps	Goals	Apps	Goals
Pontedera (loan)	2017–18	Serie C	29	1	0	0	—		1 (Note: Appearance(s) in Serie C play-off.)	0	30	1
Piacenza (loan)	2018–19	Serie C	6	0	0	0	—		—		6	0
Teramo (loan)	2018–19	Serie C	10	0	—		—		—		10	0
Pistoiese	2019–20	Serie C	23	0	0	0	—		—		23	0
Pistoiese	2020–21	Serie C	33	0	0	0	—		—		33	0
Pistoiese	Total		56	0	0	0	—		0	0	56	0
Latina	2021–22	Serie C	6	0	—		—		—		6	0
Career total			107	1	0	0	—		1	0	108	1

== Honours ==
=== Club ===
Roma Primavera

- Campionato Nazionale Primavera: 2015–16
- Coppa Italia Primavera: 2016–17
- Supercoppa Primavera: 2017
