= 2015–16 Danish Under-19 League =

Danish Under-19 League
- Season: 2015–16

The 2015–16 Danish Under-19 League season is the 13th season of the Danish Under-19 League, which decides the Danish Youth Football Champions. Midtjylland are the defending champions.

The season started on August 15, 2015, and is supposed to end on July 4, 2016.

== Teams ==
Teams consisted of ten teams from the 2015-16 Danish Superliga, with Viborg FF and Hobro IK missing. They are replaced with Vejle BK and Silkeborg IF.

=== Stadia and locations ===
Locations of the Danish Superliga 2015–16 teams

Club	Location	Stadium	Turf	Capacity
AaB	Aalborg	Nordjyske Arena	Natural	13,797
AGF	Aarhus	Ceres Park	Natural	20,032
Brøndby IF	Brøndby	Brøndby Stadium	Natural	29,000
Esbjerg fB	Esbjerg	Blue Water Arena	Natural	18,000
FC Copenhagen	Copenhagen	Telia Parken	Natural	38,065
FC Midtjylland	Herning	MCH Arena	Natural	11,800
FC Nordsjælland	Farum	Farum Park	Artificial	9,900
OB	Odense	TRE-FOR Park	Natural	15,633
Randers FC	Randers	AutoC Park Randers	Natural	12,000
Silkeborg IF	Silkeborg	MASCOT Park	Natural	10,000
SønderjyskE	Haderslev	Sydbank Park	Natural	10,000
Vejle BK	Vejle	Vejle Stadion	Natural	10,418

=== Personnel and sponsoring ===
Note: Flags indicate national team as has been defined under FIFA eligibility rules. Players and Managers may hold more than one non-FIFA nationality.

Team	Kit manufacturer	Shirt sponsor
AaB	hummel	Spar Nord
AGF	hummel	Ceres
Brøndby IF	hummel	Bet25.dk
Esbjerg fB	Nike	Sydenergi
F.C. Copenhagen	adidas	Carlsberg
FC Midtjylland	Nike	Hessel
FC Nordsjælland	Diadora	DHL
OB	hummel	Carlsberg
Randers FC	Puma	Verdo
Silkeborg IF	uhlsport	Mascot International
SønderjyskE	hummel	Frøs Herreds Sparekasse
Vejle BK	Hummel	Frøs Herreds Sparekasse

== League table ==
Pos	Team	Pld	W	D	L	GF	GA	GD	Pts	Qualification or relegation
1	FC Midtjylland	22	18	2	2	57	16	+41	56	Qualification for UEFA Youth League
2	FC Nordsjælland	22	16	2	4	65	35	+30	50	
3	AaB	22	14	2	6	50	26	+24	44	
4	Esbjerg fB	22	11	6	5	39	38	+1	39	
5	FC København	22	9	2	11	38	37	+1	29	
6	Silkeborg	22	8	4	10	36	37	−1	28	
7	Brøndby IF	22	7	5	10	27	31	−4	26	
8	Vejle	22	7	5	10	34	45	−11	26	
9	OB	22	8	2	12	28	45	−17	26	
10	Lyngby	22	5	5	12	23	41	−18	20	
11	AGF	22	6	0	16	25	47	−22	18	
12	Randers Freja	22	3	5	14	23	47	−24	14	

Updated to match(es) played on unknown. Source: DBU
