= Julian Schwermann =

German footballer

Personal information
- Date of birth: 8 July 1999 (age 27)
- Place of birth: Sundern, Germany
- Height: 1.83 m (6 ft 0 in)
- Position: Defensive midfielder

Team information
- Current team: SV Rödinghausen
- Number: 8

Youth career
- –2012: TuS Sundern
- 2012–2018: Borussia Dortmund

Senior career*
Years	Team	Apps	(Gls)
2018–2020	Borussia Dortmund II	32	(3)
2020–2022	SC Verl	53	(1)
2022–2025	Alemannia Aachen	49	(0)
2025–	SV Rödinghausen	27	(0)

International career^{‡}
2013	Germany U15	1	(1)
2014–2015	Germany U16	4	(0)
2015	Germany U17	2	(0)
2016	Germany U18	3	(0)
- * Club domestic league appearances and goals as of 24 June 2026 ‡ National team caps and goals as of 21:17, 19 September 2020 (UTC)

Julian Schwermann (born 8 July 1999) is a German professional footballer who plays as a defensive midfielder for SV Rödinghausen.

== Club career ==
Born in Sundern, Schwermann played youth football with TuS Sundern and Borussia Dortmund and senior football with Borussia Dortmund II in the Regionalliga West before signing for SC Verl in the 3. Liga in July 2020 after his contract with Borussia Dortmund II expired.

After leaving Verl in summer 2022, he signed for Regionalliga West club Alemannia Aachen. In March 2023, he extended his contract with the club. He left Aachen in summer 2025, and signed for Regionalliga West club SV Rödinghausen.

== International career ==
Schwermann has represented Germany at under-15, under-16, under-17 and under-18 level.
