= 2016–17 UEFA Youth League =

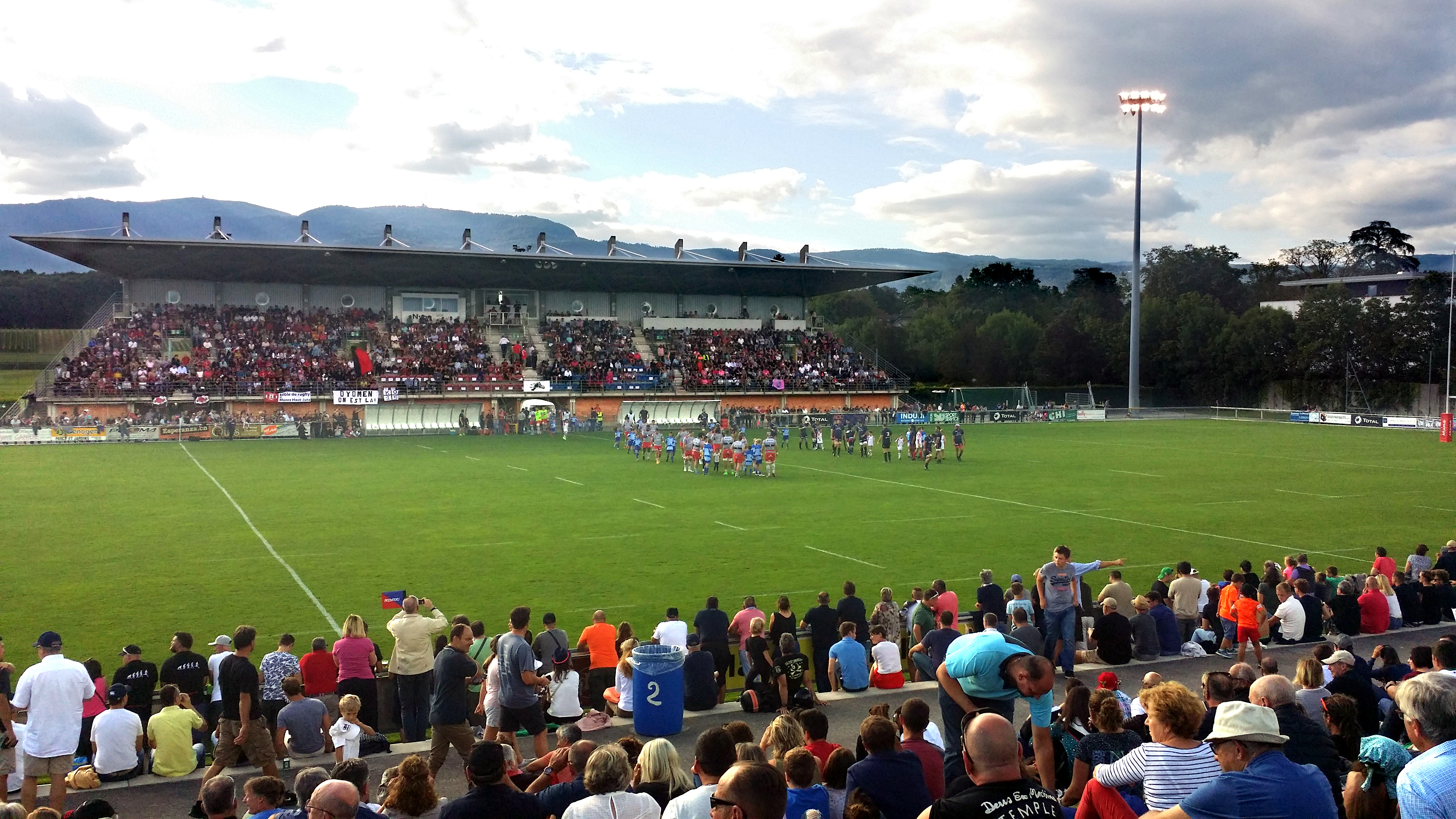
- The Colovray Stadium in Nyon hosted the semi-finals and final.

Tournament details
- Dates: 13 September 2016 – 24 April 2017
- Teams: 64 (from 40 associations)

Final positions
- Champions: (Austria) Red Bull Salzburg (1st title)
- Runners-up: (Portugal) Benfica

Tournament statistics
- Matches played: 167
- Goals scored: 550 (3.29 per match)
- Top scorer(s): (Spain) Jordi Mboula (Barcelona) (Netherlands) Kaj Sierhuis (Ajax); 8 goals each

The 2016–17 UEFA Youth League was the fourth season of the UEFA Youth League, a European youth club football competition organised by UEFA.

Chelsea were the title holders after winning the previous two editions. However, since the UEFA Youth League title holders were not given an automatic qualifying place, and both the Chelsea senior team failed to qualify for the 2016–17 UEFA Champions League and the Chelsea academy team failed to win the 2015–16 Professional U18 Development League 1, they did not qualify for this tournament to defend their title.

Red Bull Salzburg won their first title after defeating Benfica 2–1 in the final. This was the first occasion that the winner (or a finalist) had come through the Domestic Champions Path of the competition and as of 2022 the only season not to won by a side whom previously have won a European trophy.

== Teams ==
A total of 64 teams from 40 of the 55 UEFA member associations entered the tournament, with Macedonia, Republic of Ireland and Montenegro entering for the first time. They were split into two sections:

- The youth teams of the 32 clubs which qualified for the 2016–17 UEFA Champions League group stage entered the UEFA Champions League Path.
- The youth domestic champions of the top 32 associations according to their 2015 UEFA country coefficients entered the Domestic Champions Path. Associations without a youth domestic champion as well as domestic champions already included in the UEFA Champions League path were replaced by the next association in the UEFA ranking.

Rank	Association	Teams	
Rank	Association	UEFA Champions League Path	Domestic Champions Path
1	Spain	Barcelona; Real Madrid; Atlético Madrid; Sevilla	Málaga (2015–16 División de Honor Juvenil U19)
2	England	Leicester City; Arsenal; Tottenham Hotspur; Manchester City (2015–16 Professional U18 Development League 1)	
3	Germany	Bayern Munich; Borussia Dortmund (2015–16 U19 Bundesliga); Bayer Leverkusen; Borussia Mönchengladbach	
4	Italy	Juventus; Napoli	Roma (2015–16 Campionato Primavera U19)
5	Portugal	Benfica; Sporting CP; Porto (2015–16 Campeonato Nacional Juniores S19)	
6	France	Paris Saint-Germain (2015–16 Championnat National U19); Lyon; Monaco	
7	Russia	CSKA Moscow; Rostov	Dynamo Moscow (2015 U17 RFS Cup)
8	Ukraine	Dynamo Kyiv (2015–16 Ukrainian U19 League)	
9	Netherlands	PSV Eindhoven	Ajax (2015–16 U19 Eredivisie)
10	Belgium	Club Brugge	Anderlecht (2015–16 Belgian U17 League)
11	Switzerland	Basel	Zürich (2015–16 Swiss U18 League)
12	Turkey	Beşiktaş	Altınordu (2016 U19 Süper Kupa)
13	Greece		PAOK (2015–16 Superleague K17)
14	Czech Republic		Sparta Prague (2015–16 Czech U19 League)
15	Romania		Viitorul Constanța (2015–16 Romanian U19 League)
16	Austria		FC Salzburg (2015–16 U18 Jugendliga)
17	Croatia	Dinamo Zagreb (2015–16 1. HNL Juniori U19)	
18	Cyprus		APOEL (2015–16 Cypriot U17 League)
19	Poland	Legia Warsaw (2015–16 Central Junior League U19)	
20	Israel		Maccabi Haifa (2015–16 Israeli U19 Premier League)
21	Belarus		Shakhtyor Soligorsk (2015–16 Belarusian U19 League)
22	Denmark	Copenhagen	Midtjylland (2015–16 U19 Ligaen)
23	Scotland	Celtic (2015–16 Scottish U17 League)	
24	Sweden		AIK (2015 Swedish U17 League)
25	Bulgaria	Ludogorets Razgrad	Levski Sofia (2016 U18 BFU Cup)
26	Norway		Rosenborg (2015 Norwegian U19 Cup)
27	Serbia		Čukarički (2015–16 Serbian U19 League)
28	Slovenia		Domžale (2015–16 Slovenian U19 League)
29	Azerbaijan		Gabala (2015–16 Azerbaijani U19 League)
30	Slovakia		Nitra (2015–16 Slovak U19 League)
31	Hungary		Puskás Akadémia (2015–16 Hungarian U19 League)
32	Kazakhstan		Kairat (2015 Kazakhstani U18 League)
33	Moldova		Sheriff Tiraspol (2015–16 Divizia Națională U18)
34	Georgia		Dinamo Tbilisi (2015–16 Georgian U18 League)
35	Finland		HJK (2015 U17 B-Junior League)
36	Iceland		Breiðablik (2015 Icelandic U19 League)
37	Bosnia and Herzegovina		Zrinjski Mostar (2015–16 Bosnia and Herzegovina U19 Junior League)
39	Macedonia		Vardar (2015–16 Macedonian U19 League)
40	Republic of Ireland		Cork City (2015 League of Ireland U19 Division)
41	Montenegro		Mladost Podgorica (2015–16 Montenegrin U19 League)
Associations which did not enter a team (no teams qualified for UEFA Champions League group stage, and association either not ranked high enough or no youth domestic competition)
38	Liechtenstein		No youth domestic competition
42	Albania		
43	Luxembourg		
44	Northern Ireland		
45	Lithuania		
46	Latvia		
47	Malta		
48	Estonia		
49	Faroe Islands		
50	Wales		
51	Armenia		
52	Andorra		
53	San Marino		
54	Gibraltar		
55	Kosovo		

Notes

1. ^{†} Teams which were also youth domestic champions.
2. Bulgaria (BUL): The Bulgarian youth domestic champions Litex Lovech did not meet the entry criteria, and so the berth was given to the runners-up Levski Sofia.

== Squads ==
Players had to be born on or after 1 January 1998, with a maximum of three players per team born between 1 January 1997 and 31 December 1997 are allowed.

== Round and draw dates ==
The schedule of the competition was as follows (all draws were held at the UEFA headquarters in Nyon, Switzerland, unless stated otherwise).

Phase	Round	Draw date	First leg	Second leg
UEFA Champions League Path; Group stage	Matchday 1	25 August 2016 (Monaco)	13–14 September 2016	
UEFA Champions League Path; Group stage	Matchday 2	25 August 2016 (Monaco)	27–28 September 2016	
UEFA Champions League Path; Group stage	Matchday 3	25 August 2016 (Monaco)	18–19 October 2016	
UEFA Champions League Path; Group stage	Matchday 4	25 August 2016 (Monaco)	1–2 November 2016	
UEFA Champions League Path; Group stage	Matchday 5	25 August 2016 (Monaco)	22–23 November 2016	
UEFA Champions League Path; Group stage	Matchday 6	25 August 2016 (Monaco)	6–7 December 2016	
Domestic Champions Path	First round	30 August 2016	28 September 2016	19 October 2016
Domestic Champions Path	Second round	30 August 2016	2 November 2016	23 November 2016
Knockout phase	Knockout round play-offs	12 December 2016	7–8 February 2017	
Knockout phase	Round of 16	10 February 2017	21–22 February 2017	
Knockout phase	Quarter-finals	10 February 2017	7–8 March 2017	
Knockout phase	Semi-finals	10 February 2017	21 April 2017 at Colovray Stadium, Nyon	
Knockout phase	Final	10 February 2017	24 April 2017 at Colovray Stadium, Nyon	

Notes

- For the UEFA Champions League Path group stage, in principle the teams played their matches on Tuesdays and Wednesdays, the same day as the corresponding senior teams in the UEFA Champions League; however, matches could also be played on other dates, including Mondays and Thursdays.
- For the Domestic Champions Path first and second rounds, in principle matches were played on Wednesdays; however, matches could also be played on other dates, including Mondays, Tuesdays and Thursdays.
- For the play-offs, round of 16 and quarter-finals, in principle matches were played on Tuesdays and Wednesdays; however, matches could also be played on other dates, provided they were completed before the following dates:
  - Play-offs: 10 February 2017
  - Round of 16: 24 February 2017
  - Quarter-finals: 17 March 2017

== UEFA Champions League Path ==
For the UEFA Champions League Path, the 32 teams were drawn into eight groups of four. There was no separate draw held, with the group compositions identical to the draw for the 2016–17 UEFA Champions League group stage, which was held on 25 August 2016, 18:00 CEST, at the Grimaldi Forum in Monaco.

In each group, teams played against each other home-and-away in a round-robin format. The eight group winners advanced to the round of 16, while the eight runners-up advanced to the play-offs, where they were joined by the eight second round winners from the Domestic Champions Path. The matchdays were 13–14 September, 27–28 September, 18–19 October, 1–2 November, 22–23 November, and 6–7 December 2016.

Tiebreakers
The teams were ranked according to points (3 points for a win, 1 point for a draw, 0 points for a loss). If two or more teams were equal on points on completion of the group matches, the following criteria were applied in the order given to determine the rankings (regulations Article 14.03):
1. higher number of points obtained in the group matches played among the teams in question;
2. superior goal difference from the group matches played among the teams in question;
3. higher number of goals scored in the group matches played among the teams in question;
4. higher number of goals scored away from home in the group matches played among the teams in question;
5. if, after having applied criteria 1 to 4, teams still had an equal ranking, criteria 1 to 4 were reapplied exclusively to the matches between the teams in question to determine their final rankings. If this procedure did not lead to a decision, criteria 6 to 12 applied;
6. superior goal difference in all group matches;
7. higher number of goals scored in all group matches;
8. higher number of away goals scored in all group matches;
9. higher number of wins in all group matches;
10. higher number of away wins in all group matches;
11. lower disciplinary points total based only on yellow and red cards received in all group matches (red card = 3 points, yellow card = 1 point, expulsion for two yellow cards in one match = 3 points);
12. drawing of lots.

=== Group A ===
Pos	Team	Pld	W	D	L	GF	GA	GD	Pts	Qualification	PAR	BSL	ARS	LUD
1	(France) Paris Saint-Germain	6	4	2	0	21	7	+14	14	Advance to round of 16	—	4–1	0–0	4–1
2	(Switzerland) Basel	6	3	1	2	11	9	+2	10	Advance to play-offs	2–3	—	1–1	1–0
3	(England) Arsenal	6	1	4	1	8	6	+2	7		2–2	1–2	—	3–0
4	(Bulgaria) Ludogorets Razgrad	6	0	1	5	3	21	−18	1		1–8	0–4	1–1	—

Source: UEFA

=== Group B ===
Pos	Team	Pld	W	D	L	GF	GA	GD	Pts	Qualification	DKV	BEN	NAP	BES
1	(Ukraine) Dynamo Kyiv	6	5	1	0	16	7	+9	16	Advance to round of 16	—	2–1	4–1	3–1
2	(Portugal) Benfica	6	3	1	2	10	6	+4	10	Advance to play-offs	1–2	—	2–0	0–0
3	(Italy) Napoli	6	1	1	4	6	13	−7	4		0–2	2–3	—	2–2
4	(Turkey) Beşiktaş	6	0	3	3	6	12	−6	3		3–3	0–3	0–1	—

Source: UEFA

=== Group C ===
Pos	Team	Pld	W	D	L	GF	GA	GD	Pts	Qualification	BAR	MCI	BMG	CEL
1	(Spain) Barcelona	6	5	0	1	13	5	+8	15	Advance to round of 16	—	1–0	1–2	2–1
2	(England) Manchester City	6	4	0	2	13	7	+6	12	Advance to play-offs	0–2	—	4–1	3–2
3	(Germany) Borussia Mönchengladbach	6	2	1	3	10	12	−2	7		1–3	1–2	—	4–1
4	(Scotland) Celtic	6	0	1	5	6	18	−12	1		1–4	0–4	1–1	—

Source: UEFA

=== Group D ===
Pos	Team	Pld	W	D	L	GF	GA	GD	Pts	Qualification	PSV	ATM	BAY	RST
1	(Netherlands) PSV Eindhoven	6	4	1	1	16	2	+14	13	Advance to round of 16	—	0–0	2–0	6–0
2	(Spain) Atlético Madrid	6	3	2	1	8	5	+3	11	Advance to play-offs	2–0	—	1–3	1–0
3	(Germany) Bayern Munich	6	3	1	2	9	8	+1	10		0–2	1–1	—	4–2
4	(Russia) Rostov	6	0	0	6	3	21	−18	0		0–6	1–3	0–1	—

Source: UEFA

=== Group E ===
Pos	Team	Pld	W	D	L	GF	GA	GD	Pts	Qualification	CSKA	MON	LEV	TOT
1	(Russia) CSKA Moscow	6	4	1	1	15	6	+9	13	Advance to round of 16	—	4–1	2–1	3–2
2	(France) Monaco	6	4	0	2	10	14	−4	12	Advance to play-offs	0–5	—	2–1	2–1
3	(Germany) Bayer Leverkusen	6	2	0	4	9	10	−1	6		2–1	1–2	—	3–1
4	(England) Tottenham Hotspur	6	1	1	4	8	12	−4	4		0–0	2–3	2–1	—

Source: UEFA

=== Group F ===
Pos	Team	Pld	W	D	L	GF	GA	GD	Pts	Qualification	RMA	DOR	SPO	LEG
1	(Spain) Real Madrid	6	4	1	1	15	10	+5	13	Advance to round of 16	—	1–3	1–1	3–2
2	(Germany) Borussia Dortmund	6	2	2	2	11	11	0	8	Advance to play-offs	2–5	—	0–1	3–3
3	(Portugal) Sporting CP	6	1	3	2	6	9	−3	6		1–3	1–1	—	2–2
4	(Poland) Legia Warsaw	6	1	2	3	10	12	−2	5		1–2	0–2	2–0	—

Source: UEFA

=== Group G ===
Pos	Team	Pld	W	D	L	GF	GA	GD	Pts	Qualification	POR	CPH	BRU	LEI
1	(Portugal) Porto	6	4	0	2	12	8	+4	12	Advance to round of 16	—	4–1	1–3	2–1
2	(Denmark) Copenhagen	6	3	1	2	12	10	+2	10	Advance to play-offs	3–1	—	0–0	3–2
3	(Belgium) Club Brugge	6	3	1	2	8	9	−1	10		0–2	0–3	—	2–1
4	(England) Leicester City	6	1	0	5	9	14	−5	3		0–2	3–2	2–3	—

Source: UEFA

=== Group H ===
Pos	Team	Pld	W	D	L	GF	GA	GD	Pts	Qualification	SEV	JUV	LYO	DZG
1	(Spain) Sevilla	6	3	1	2	9	8	+1	10	Advance to round of 16	—	0–2	2–1	1–1
2	(Italy) Juventus	6	3	0	3	8	5	+3	9	Advance to play-offs	2–1	—	0–1	0–1
3	(France) Lyon	6	3	0	3	6	7	−1	9		0–1	0–3	—	2–0
4	(Croatia) Dinamo Zagreb	6	2	1	3	7	10	−3	7		2–4	2–1	1–2	—

Source: UEFA

== Domestic Champions Path ==
For the Domestic Champions Path, the 32 teams were drawn into two rounds of two-legged home-and-away ties. The draw was held on 30 August 2016, 13:45 CEST, at the UEFA headquarters in Nyon, Switzerland. There were no seedings, but the 32 teams were split into four groups defined by sporting and geographical criteria prior to the draw.

The eight second round winners advanced to the play-offs, where they were joined by the eight group runners-up from the UEFA Champions League Path. If the aggregate scores were level after full-time of the second leg, the away goals rule was used to decide the winner. If still tied, the match was decided by a penalty shoot-out (no extra time was played).

=== First round ===
The first legs were played on 21, 27, 28, 29 September and 5 October, and the second legs were played on 19 October 2016.

Team 1	Agg.	Team 2	1st leg	2nd leg
Nitra (Slovakia)	2–8	(Spain) Málaga	2–3	0–5
Puskás Akadémia (Hungary)	1–1 (a)	(Greece) PAOK	1–1	0–0
APOEL (Cyprus)	1–9	(Italy) Roma	0–3	1–6
Domžale (Slovenia)	2–5	(Serbia) Čukarički	1–1	1–4
Breiðablik (Iceland)	0–7	(Netherlands) Ajax	0–3	0–4
HJK (Finland)	0–1	(Republic of Ireland) Cork City	0–0	0–1
Anderlecht (Belgium)	1–3	(Denmark) Midtjylland	0–0	1–3
Rosenborg (Norway)	3–1	(Sweden) AIK	0–0	3–1
Viitorul Constanța (Romania)	5–1	(Moldova) Sheriff Tiraspol	4–1	1–0
Zrinjski Mostar (Bosnia and Herzegovina)	0–9	(Switzerland) Zürich	0–3	0–6
Red Bull Salzburg (Austria)	8–0	(North Macedonia) Vardar	5–0	3–0
Sparta Prague (Czech Republic)	9–0	(Montenegro) Mladost Podgorica	4–0	5–0
Gabala (Azerbaijan)	0–7	(Russia) Dynamo Moscow	0–2	0–5
Maccabi Haifa (Israel)	8–2	(Belarus) Shakhtyor Soligorsk	5–0	3–2
Dinamo Tbilisi (Georgia (country))	1–8	(Kazakhstan) Kairat	0–3	1–5
Altınordu (Turkey)	6–1	(Bulgaria) Levski Sofia	5–0	1–1

=== Second round ===
The first legs were played on 2, 9 and 16 November, and the second legs were played on 22, 23 and 30 November 2016.

Team 1	Agg.	Team 2	1st leg	2nd leg
PAOK (Greece)	1–4	(Netherlands) Ajax	0–2	1–2
Cork City (Republic of Ireland)	1–4 (Note: Order of legs reversed after original draw.)	(Italy) Roma	1–3	0–1
Málaga (Spain)	2–4	(Denmark) Midtjylland	2–0	0–4
Rosenborg (Norway)	2–1	(Serbia) Čukarički	0–1	2–0
Altınordu (Turkey)	8–5	(Czech Republic) Sparta Prague	6–2	2–3
Viitorul Constanța (Romania)	5–2	(Switzerland) Zürich	5–0	0–2
Maccabi Haifa (Israel)	1–1 (a)	(Russia) Dynamo Moscow	0–0	1–1
Red Bull Salzburg (Austria)	9–1	(Kazakhstan) Kairat	8–1	1–0

== Knockout phase ==
For the knockout phase (round of 16 onwards), the 16 teams were drawn into a single-elimination tournament, with all ties played over one match. The draw was held on 10 February 2017, 13:00 CET, at the UEFA headquarters in Nyon, Switzerland. The mechanism of the draws for each round was as follows:

- In the draw for the round of 16, the eight group winners from the UEFA Champions League Path were drawn against the eight play-off winners. Teams from the same UEFA Champions League Path group could not be drawn against each other, but teams from the same association could be drawn against each other. The draw also decided the home team for each round of 16 match.
- In the draws for the quarter-finals onwards, there were no seedings, and teams from the same UEFA Champions League Path group or the same association could be drawn against each other. The draws also decided the home team for each quarter-final, and the "home" team for administrative purposes for each semi-final and final (which were played at a neutral venue).

If the scores were level after full-time, the match was decided by a penalty shoot-out (no extra time was played).

=== Bracket ===
Knockout round play-offs
(Italy) Roma	1
(France) Monaco	2
(Netherlands) Ajax	2
(Italy) Juventus	0
(Norway) Rosenborg	1
(Switzerland) Basel	0
(Denmark) Midtjylland	1 (5)
(Portugal) Benfica (p)	1 (6)
(Israel) Maccabi Haifa	0
(Germany) Borussia Dortmund	1
(Romania) Viitorul Constanța	4
(Denmark) Copenhagen	2
(Austria) Red Bull Salzburg (p)	1 (4)
(England) Manchester City	1 (3)
(Turkey) Altınordu	0
(Spain) Atlético Madrid	2

Round of 16
(France) Monaco	3
(Spain) Real Madrid	4
(Netherlands) Ajax	3
(Ukraine) Dynamo Kyiv	0
(Russia) CSKA Moscow	2
(Norway) Rosenborg	1
(Netherlands) PSV Eindhoven	1 (4)
(Portugal) Benfica (p)	1 (5)
(Spain) Barcelona	4
(Germany) Borussia Dortmund	1
(Portugal) Porto	3
(Romania) Viitorul Constanța	0
(Austria) Red Bull Salzburg	5
(France) Paris Saint-Germain	0
(Spain) Atlético Madrid	3
(Spain) Sevilla	2

Quarter-finals
(Spain) Real Madrid	2
(Netherlands) Ajax	1
(Russia) CSKA Moscow	0
(Portugal) Benfica	2
(Spain) Barcelona	2
(Portugal) Porto	1
(Austria) Red Bull Salzburg	2
(Spain) Atlético Madrid	1

Semi-finals
21 April – Nyon
(Spain) Real Madrid	2
(Portugal) Benfica	4
21 April – Nyon
(Spain) Barcelona	1
(Austria) Red Bull Salzburg	2

Final
24 April – Nyon
(Portugal) Benfica	1
(Austria) Red Bull Salzburg	2

=== Knockout round play-offs ===
For the knockout round play-offs, the 16 teams were drawn into eight ties played over one match. The draw was held on 12 December 2016, 14:00 CET, at the UEFA headquarters in Nyon, Switzerland. The eight second round winners from the Domestic Champions Path were drawn against the eight group runners-up from the UEFA Champions League Path, with the teams from the Domestic Champions Path hosting the match. Teams from the same association could not be drawn against each other.

The eight play-off winners advanced to the round of 16, where they were joined by the eight group winners from the UEFA Champions League Path. If the scores were level after full-time, the match was decided by a penalty shoot-out (no extra time was played). The play-offs were played on 7 and 8 February 2017.

Home team	Score	Away team
Red Bull Salzburg (Austria)	1–1 (4–3 p)	(England) Manchester City
Midtjylland (Denmark)	1–1 (5–6 p)	(Portugal) Benfica
Viitorul Constanța (Romania)	4–2	(Denmark) Copenhagen
Roma (Italy)	1–2	(France) Monaco
Rosenborg (Norway)	1–0	(Switzerland) Basel
Altınordu (Turkey)	0–2	(Spain) Atlético Madrid
Maccabi Haifa (Israel)	0–1	(Germany) Borussia Dortmund
Ajax (Netherlands)	2–0	(Italy) Juventus

=== Round of 16 ===
The round of 16 matches were played on 21 and 22 February 2017.

Home team	Score	Away team
CSKA Moscow (Russia)	2–1	(Norway) Rosenborg
Atlético Madrid (Spain)	3–2	(Spain) Sevilla
Barcelona (Spain)	4–1	(Germany) Borussia Dortmund
Ajax (Netherlands)	3–0	(Ukraine) Dynamo Kyiv
Monaco (France)	3–4	(Spain) Real Madrid
Red Bull Salzburg (Austria)	5–0	(France) Paris Saint-Germain
PSV Eindhoven (Netherlands)	1–1 (4–5 p)	(Portugal) Benfica
Porto (Portugal)	3–0	(Romania) Viitorul Constanța

=== Quarter-finals ===
The quarter-finals were played on 7 and 8 March 2017.

Home team	Score	Away team
Real Madrid (Spain)	2–1	(Netherlands) Ajax
CSKA Moscow (Russia)	0–2	(Portugal) Benfica
Barcelona (Spain)	2–1	(Portugal) Porto
Red Bull Salzburg (Austria)	2–1	(Spain) Atlético Madrid

=== Semi-finals ===
The semi-finals were played on 21 April 2017 at Colovray Stadium, Nyon.

Team 1	Score	Team 2
Real Madrid (Spain)	2–4	(Portugal) Benfica
Barcelona (Spain)	1–2	(Austria) Red Bull Salzburg

=== Final ===
The final was played on 24 April 2017 at the Colovray Stadium in Nyon, Switzerland.

24 April 2017
17:00 UTC+2

Benfica (Portugal)	1–2	(Austria) Red Bull Salzburg
Gomes 29'	Report	Daka 72'; Schmidt 76'

Colovray Stadium, Nyon
Attendance: 4,000
Referee: Ali Palabıyık (Turkey)

== Statistics ==
=== Top goalscorers ===
Rank	Player	Team	Goals	Minutes played
1	(Spain) Jordi Mboula	(Spain) Barcelona	8	503
1	(Netherlands) Kaj Sierhuis	(Netherlands) Ajax	8	616
3	(Portugal) Rui Pedro	(Portugal) Porto	7	525
3	(Austria) Hannes Wolf	(Austria) Red Bull Salzburg	7	590
3	(Germany) Mërgim Berisha	(Austria) Red Bull Salzburg	7	630
6	(Turkey) Fatih Aktay	(Turkey) Altınordu	6	442
6	(Ukraine) Bogdan Lednev	(Ukraine) Dynamo Kyiv	6	609
6	(Malta) Irvin Cardona	(France) Monaco	6	618
6	(Russia) Timur Zhamaletdinov	(Russia) CSKA Moscow	6	720
6	(Portugal) João Félix	(Portugal) Benfica	6	807

Source: UEFA

=== Top assists ===
Rank	Player	Team	Assists	Minutes played
1	(Austria) Xaver Schlager	(Austria) Red Bull Salzburg	5	417
1	(Netherlands) Justin Kluivert	(Netherlands) Ajax	5	540
1	(Denmark) Nicklas Røjkjær	(Denmark) Copenhagen	5	603
1	(Paraguay) Sergio Díaz	(Spain) Real Madrid	5	641
5	(Germany) Ba-Muaka Simakala	(Germany) Borussia Mönchengladbach	4	540
5	(Austria) Hannes Wolf	(Austria) Red Bull Salzburg	4	590
5	(Germany) Mërgim Berisha	(Austria) Red Bull Salzburg	4	630
5	(Mali) Moussa Sylla	(France) Monaco	4	720

Source: UEFA
