= Gabriele Bove =

Italian football player

Personal information
- Date of birth: 16 April 1998 (age 28)
- Place of birth: Turin, Italy
- Height: 1.78 m (5 ft 10 in)
- Position: Midfielder

Team information
- Current team: Fanfulla

Youth career
- 2008–2017: Juventus

Senior career*
Years	Team	Apps	(Gls)
2017–2020	Sambenedettese	53	(2)
2020	Gubbio	4	(0)
2021	Recanatese	11	(0)
2021–2022	Chieri	25	(1)
2022–2023	Chisola	30	(4)
2023–	Fanfulla	8	(1)
- * Club domestic league appearances and goals as of 20 December 2023

Gabriele Bove (born 16 April 1998) is an Italian football player who plays for Serie D club Fanfulla.

== Club career ==
He made his Serie C debut for Sambenedettese on 27 August 2017 in a game against Modena.

On 31 January 2020, he signed with Gubbio.
