= Keba Coly =

Senegalese footballer

Personal information
- Full name: Sidy Keba Coly
- Date of birth: 20 February 1998 (age 28)
- Place of birth: Dakar, Senegal
- Height: 1.84 m (6 ft 0 in)
- Position: Forward

Team information
- Current team: Scafatese
- Number: 37

Youth career
- 2015: Pescara Sud
- 2015–2016: Spoltore
- 2016–2018: Roma

Senior career*
Years	Team	Apps	(Gls)
2018–2020	Roma	0	(0)
2018–2019	→ Ascoli (loan)	2	(0)
2019–2020	→ Rende (loan)	4	(0)
2022	Castelnuovo Vomano	11	(5)
2022	Tivoli	0	(0)
2023–2024	San Marzano	6	(2)
2024–	Scafatese	0	(0)
- * Club domestic league appearances and goals as of 17 November 2024

Sidy Keba Coly, known as Keba Coly (born 20 February 1998) is a Senegalese football player who plays for Italian Serie D club Scafatese.

== Club career ==
=== Roma ===
He began playing for the Roma's Under-19 squad in the 2016–17 season and scored 16 goals in all competitions in his first season. He made his debut for the senior squad during the summer 2017 pre-season camp. On 28 September 2017, he signed a 4-year senior contract with the club.

==== Loan to Ascoli ====
On 17 August 2018, he joined Serie B club Ascoli on loan with option to purchase.

He made his Serie B debut for Ascoli on 4 May 2019 in a game against Palermo, as an 87th-minute substitute for Moutir Chajia.

==== Loan to Rende ====
On 31 August 2019, he joined Serie C club Rende on loan.
