= Lavdrim Rexhepi =

Kosovo-Albanian footballer (born 1998)

Personal information
- Full name: Lavdrim Rexhepi
- Date of birth: 12 February 1998 (age 28)
- Place of birth: Zürich, Switzerland
- Height: 1.75 m (5 ft 9 in)
- Position: Midfielder

Team information
- Current team: FC Rapperswil-Jona (on loan from FC Zürich)
- Number: 24

Youth career
- 2003–2017: FC Zürich

Senior career*
Years	Team	Apps	(Gls)
2017–	FC Zürich	3	(0)
2018–	→ FC Rapperswil-Jona (loan)	13	(2)
- * Club domestic league appearances and goals as of 10 June 2019

Lavdrim Rexhepi (born 12 February 1998) is a Swiss footballer who plays as a midfielder for FC Zürich in the Swiss Super League.

== Professional career ==
Rexhepi made his professional debut for FCZ in a 1–1 Swiss Super League tie with FC Luzern on 18 February 2018.

On 23 November 2018, Rexhepi was loaned out to FC Rapperswil-Jona until the end of 2018. The loan was later extended for the rest of the season. This was confirmed on 8 January 2019.

== Personal life ==
Rexhepi was born in Switzerland and is of Kosovan–Albanian descent.
