= Diogo Mendes =

Cape Verdean footballer

Personal information
- Full name: Diogo Alexandre de Almeida Mendes
- Date of birth: 24 January 1998 (age 28)
- Place of birth: Faro, Portugal
- Height: 1.81 m (5 ft 11 in)
- Position: Midfielder

Youth career
- 2006–2009: Louletano
- 2010–2017: Benfica

Senior career*
Years	Team	Apps	(Gls)
2017–2021	Benfica B	72	(3)
2021–2024	Marítimo	79	(2)
2024–2026	Rapid București	2	(0)

International career^{‡}
2014	Portugal U16	1	(0)
2016	Portugal U18	3	(0)
2023–	Cape Verde	4	(0)
- * Club domestic league appearances and goals as of 18 August 2024 ‡ National team caps and goals as of 11 June 2024

Diogo Alexandre de Almeida Mendes (born 24 January 1998), known as Diogo Mendes, is a professional footballer who plays as a midfielder. Born in Portugal, he plays for the Cape Verde national team.

== International career ==
Born in Portugal, Mendes is of Cape Verdean descent. He is a former youth international for Portugal. In October 2023, he was called up to the Cape Verde national team for a set of friendlies.

=== International stats ===
As of match played 11 June 2024

Appearances and goals by national team and year
National team	Year	Apps	Goals
Cape Verde	2023	1	0
Cape Verde	2024	3	0
Total		4	0
