= Lorenzo Grossi =

Italian footballer

Personal information
- Date of birth: 25 March 1998 (age 28)
- Place of birth: Rome, Italy
- Height: 1.83 m (6 ft 0 in)
- Position: Midfielder

Team information
- Current team: Termoli
- Number: 23

Youth career
- –2017: Roma

Senior career*
Years	Team	Apps	(Gls)
2017–2020	Pro Vercelli	11	(0)
2018–2019	→ Gozzano (loan)	12	(0)
2020–2022	Fermana	25	(0)
2022	Nuova Florida	15	(1)
2022–2023	Aprilia	32	(2)
2023–	Termoli	14	(1)

International career^{‡}
2013	Italy U15	2	(0)
2013	Italy U16	2	(1)
2015–2016	Italy U18	3	(0)
- * Club domestic league appearances and goals as of 20 December 2023 ‡ National team caps and goals as of 13 April 2016

Lorenzo Grossi (born 25 March 1998) is an Italian professional footballer who plays as a midfielder for Serie D club Termoli.

== Club career ==
Born in Rome, Grossi was formed in Roma youth sector.

On 5 October 2020, he joined Serie B club Pro Vercelli. Grossi was loaned to Gozzano for the 2018–19 Serie C season, and made his professional debut on 17 August 2018 against Virtus Entella.

On 5 October 2020, he joined Serie C club Fermana. On 31 January 2022, his contract was terminated by mutual consent.

On 31 January 2022, he signed with Serie D club Nuova Florida Calcio.

== International career ==
Grossi was a youth international for Italy.
