= Simon Rhein =

German footballer

Personal information
- Date of birth: 18 May 1998 (age 28)
- Place of birth: Hilden, Germany
- Height: 1.80 m (5 ft 11 in)
- Position: Midfielder

Youth career
- –2005: SC Unterbach
- 2005–2017: Bayer Leverkusen

Senior career*
Years	Team	Apps	(Gls)
2017–2019	1. FC Nürnberg II	44	(4)
2018–2021	1. FC Nürnberg	10	(0)
2019–2020	→ Würzburger Kickers (loan)	29	(1)
2021–2024	Hansa Rostock	76	(1)
- * Club domestic league appearances and goals as of 22 May 2024

Simon Rhein (born 18 May 1998) is a German professional footballer who plays as a midfielder.

== Career ==
Rhein made his professional debut for 1. FC Nürnberg in the Bundesliga on 28 October 2018, starting in the home match against Eintracht Frankfurt, which finished as a 1–1 draw.

On 2 September 2019, Rhein was loaned out to Würzburger Kickers until the end of 2019–20 season.
