= Preslav Petrov (footballer, born 1997) =

Bulgarian footballer

Personal information
- Full name: Preslav Milenov Petrov
- Date of birth: 14 February 1997 (age 29)
- Place of birth: Ruse, Bulgaria
- Position: Full-back

Team information
- Current team: Spartak Varna
- Number: 3

Youth career
- –2017: Ludogorets

Senior career*
Years	Team	Apps	(Gls)
2015–2020	Ludogorets II	99	(4)
2018–2020	Ludogorets	1	(0)
2020	Montana	4	(1)
2021	Dobrudzha Dobrich	9	(2)
2021–2022	Yantra Gabrovo	32	(3)
2022–2023	CSKA 1948 II	5	(0)
2023–	Spartak Varna	12	(0)

International career
2017–2018	Bulgaria U21	2	(0)
- * Club domestic league appearances and goals as of 20 June 2024

Preslav Milenov Petrov (Bulgarian: Преслав Миленов Петров; born 14 February 1997) is a Bulgarian footballer who plays as a defender for Spartak Varna.

== Career ==
=== Ludogorets Razgrad ===
Petrov made his professional debut for the first team on 20 May 2018 in a league match against Botev Plovdiv.

=== Spartak Varna ===
In June 2023, Petrov joined Spartak Varna.

== Career statistics ==
=== Club ===
As of 19 June 2019

Club performance			League		Cup		Continental		Other		Total	
Club	League	Season	Apps	Goals	Apps	Goals	Apps	Goals	Apps	Goals	Apps	Goals
Bulgaria			League		Bulgarian Cup		Europe		Other (Note: Includes Bulgarian Supercup matches.)		Total	
Ludogorets Razgrad II	B Group	2015–16	9	2	–		–		–		9	2
Ludogorets Razgrad II	Second League	2016–17	15	0	–		–		–		15	0
Ludogorets Razgrad II	Second League	2017–18	27	2	–		–		–		27	2
Ludogorets Razgrad II	Second League	2017–18	28	0	–		–		–		28	0
Ludogorets Razgrad II	Total		79	4	0	0	0	0	0	0	79	4
Ludogorets Razgrad	First League	2017–18	0	0	0	0	0	0	—		1	0
Ludogorets Razgrad	Total		1	0	0	0	0	0	0	0	1	0
Career statistics			80	4	0	0	0	0	0	0	80	4
