= Antonio Tartaglione =

Italian footballer (born 1998)

Personal information
- Full name: Antonio Tartaglione
- Date of birth: 21 August 1998 (age 28)
- Place of birth: San Vincenzo, Tuscany, Italy
- Height: 1.73 m (5 ft 8 in)
- Position: Midfielder

Team information
- Current team: Aglianese

Youth career
- –2017: Pistoiese

Senior career*
Years	Team	Apps	(Gls)
2017–2019	Pistoiese	30	(1)
2019–	Aglianese	10	(0)
- * Club domestic league appearances and goals as of 23:09, 2 April 2020 (UTC)

Antonio Tartaglione (born 21 August 1998) is an Italian football player. He plays for Aglianese as a midfielder.

== Club career ==
=== Pistoiese ===
On 3 September 2017, Tartaglione made his professional debut for Pistoiese as a starter in a 1–0 home win over Monza, he was replaced by Gregorio Luperini in the 56th minute. On 15 October he scored his first professional goal in the 25th minute of a 2–2 home draw against Lucchese. On 23 October he played his first entire match, a 2–2 away draw against Pontedera. His contract with Pistoiese was dissolved by mutual consent on 30 November 2019.

=== Aglianese ===
On 1 December 2019, he joined Aglianese in Serie D.

== Career statistics ==
=== Club ===
As of 29 May 2018

Club	Season	League			Cup		Europe		Other		Total	
Club	Season	League	Apps	Goals	Apps	Goals	Apps	Goals	Apps	Goals	Apps	Goals
Pistoiese (loan)	2017–18	Serie C	10	1	0	0	—		—		10	1
Career total			10	1	0	0	—		—		10	1
