= Ivan Božić (footballer, born 1997) =

Croatian footballer

Personal information
- Date of birth: 8 June 1997 (age 29)
- Place of birth: Vinkovci, Croatia
- Height: 1.81 m (5 ft 11 in)
- Position: Forward

Team information
- Current team: Slaven Belupo
- Number: 9

Youth career
- 2005–2009: Croatia Novi Jankovci
- 2009–2010: Cibalia
- 2010–2011: Croatia Novi Jankovci
- 2011: Cibalia
- 2012: HAŠK Sokol Stari Jankovci
- 2012–2014: Cibalia
- 2014–2016: Dinamo Zagreb

Senior career*
Years	Team	Apps	(Gls)
2015–2021	Dinamo Zagreb II	57	(14)
2016–2021	Dinamo Zagreb	1	(0)
2018	→ Lokomotiva (loan)	5	(0)
2019	→ Rudeš (loan)	16	(0)
2019–2021	→ Celje (loan)	63	(16)
2021–2023	Celje	40	(7)
2023–2025	Šibenik	62	(15)
2025–	Slaven Belupo	6	(1)

International career
2013	Croatia U17	1	(0)
2015	Croatia U18	2	(2)
2015–2016	Croatia U19	11	(3)
2018	Croatia U20	1	(0)
- * Club domestic league appearances and goals as of 5 June 2026

Ivan Božić (born 8 June 1997) is a Croatian footballer who plays as a forward for Slaven Belupo.

== Club career ==
Božić made his professional debut in the Croatian First Football League for GNK Dinamo Zagreb on 6 May 2016 in a game against NK Slaven Belupo.

He joined NK Rudeš on 22 January 2019.

In the summer of 2025, Božić joined Slaven Belupo. However, after only five games played, having scored one goal, he had injured his right ankle, which required an operation, keeping him off the pitch for most of the season.

== Honours ==
Dinamo Zagreb

- Croatian First League: 2015–16
- Croatian Cup: 2015–16

Celje

- Slovenian PrvaLiga: 2019–20
