= 2022–23 Real Madrid CF season =

Real Madrid
2022–23 season
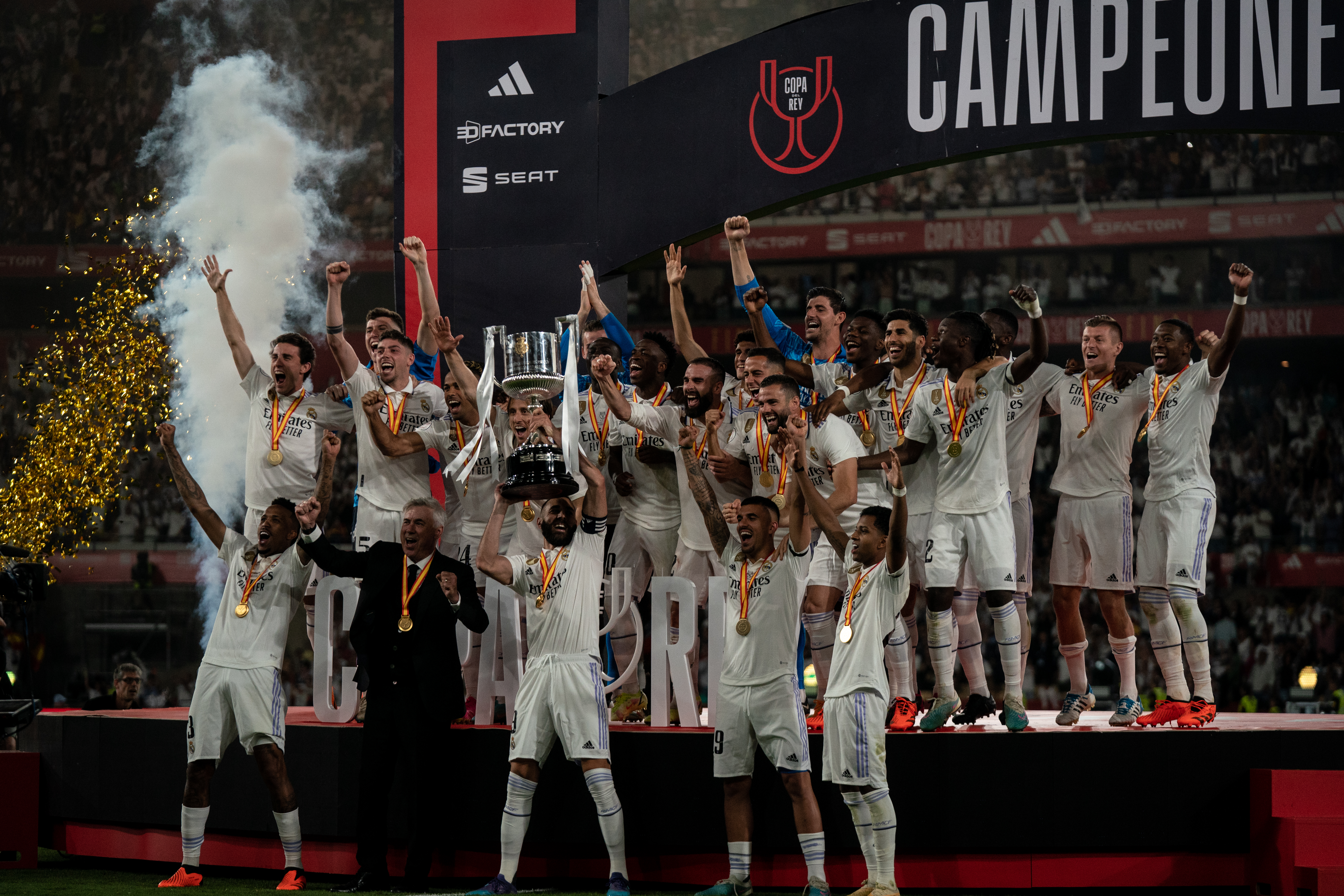
- Real Madrid celebrating their 20th Copa del Rey on 6 May 2023
- President: Florentino Pérez
- Head coach: Carlo Ancelotti
- Stadium: Santiago Bernabéu
- La Liga: 2nd
- Copa del Rey: Winners
- Supercopa de España: Runners-up
- UEFA Champions League: Semi-finals
- UEFA Super Cup: Winners
- FIFA Club World Cup: Winners
- Top goalscorer: League: Karim Benzema (19); All: Karim Benzema (31)
- Highest home attendance: 68,000 vs Atlético Madrid
- Lowest home attendance: 44,319 vs Elche
- Average home league attendance: 56,649
- Biggest win: Real Madrid 6–0 Valladolid
- Biggest defeat: Manchester City 4–0 Real Madrid
Home colours	Away colours	Third colours

The 2022–23 season was Real Madrid Club de Fútbol's 119th season in existence and the club's 92nd consecutive season in the top flight of Spanish football. In addition to the domestic league, Real Madrid participated in this season's editions of the Copa del Rey, the Supercopa de España, and the UEFA Champions League. As the reigning European champions, they contested the UEFA Super Cup against Eintracht Frankfurt, winning 2–0 and claiming a record-equalling fifth title, and then went on to win a record-extending fifth FIFA Club World Cup title in February 2023.

Real Madrid did not play any official matches between 10 November and 30 December due to a mid-season break in accommodation of the 2022 FIFA World Cup in Qatar. La Liga was suspended after matchday 14, and the Champions League group stage wrapped up earlier than usual, at the beginning of November.

This season was the first since 2005–06 without Marcelo, who departed as a free agent in the summer, first since 2012–13 without Gareth Bale and Isco, and the first season since 2014–15 without Casemiro, who departed to Manchester United.

== Kits ==
Home	Home alt. (Note: Only worn in the away match against Chelsea.)	Away	Third	Goalkeeper 1	Goalkeeper 2	Goalkeeper 3

== Summary ==
=== Pre-season ===
On 1 June, right after the conclusion of the 2021–22 season, the club announced the departures of Isco and Gareth Bale due to the expiration of their contracts, both players having spent nine seasons playing for Los Blancos. On 2 June, Madrid announced the arrival of Antonio Rüdiger on a free transfer from Chelsea, with the German signing a four-year deal. On 8 June, Luka Modrić renewed his contract with Real Madrid until 2023. Three days later, Madrid announced the signing of Aurélien Tchouaméni from Monaco, penning a six-year contract with the player. On 12 June, Madrid announced the departure of the team's captain, Marcelo, after 15 years of service; he won 25 titles with Real Madrid, more than any other player in the history of the club. On 8 July, the club announced that they had reached an agreement with Fiorentina for the permanent transfer of Luka Jović. Eleven days later, Madrid announced the departure of Takefusa Kubo to Real Sociedad. On 1 August, Borja Mayoral left the club to join Getafe on a permanent transfer.

=== August ===
On 10 August, Real Madrid opened the season with a 2–0 victory over Eintracht Frankfurt in the UEFA Super Cup. David Alaba and Karim Benzema scored the goals, with the latter breaking the tie with Raúl and becoming the club's outright second-highest goalscorer. The win marked Madrid's fifth European Super Cup title, a tournament record shared with Milan and Barcelona. Four days later, Lucas Vázquez and Alaba scored two second-half goals, as Madrid started their La Liga title defense with a 2–1 win at Almería. On 19 August, the club announced an agreement with Manchester United on the transfer of Casemiro, who spent nine years at Real Madrid and won 18 trophies. On 20 August, Celta Vigo was beaten 4–1 on the road, with Benzema, Luka Modrić, Vinícius Júnior and Federico Valverde on the scoresheet. Eight days later, a goal from Vinícius and a late Benzema brace got Madrid a 3–1 win at Espanyol, their third straight away win.

=== September ===
On the third day of the new month, goals from Vinícius and Rodrygo secured Madrid a 2–1 win over Real Betis at the Santiago Bernabéu, ending a five-year winless and goalless home run against Los Verdiblancos. On 6 September, Madrid faced Celtic away from home in the first match of the UEFA Champions League and won 3–0, with Vinícius, Modrić and Eden Hazard scoring the goals. Five days later, a strike from Valverde and goals from Vinícius, Rodrygo and Rüdiger, a debut one for the German, earned Real a 4–1 home victory over Mallorca. On 14 September, Madrid defeated RB Leipzig 2–0 at home on matchday 2 of the Champions League, thanks to goals from Valverde and Marco Asensio. Four days later, Rodrygo and Valverde scored two first-half goals for a 2–1 away win against Atlético Madrid in the Madrid derby.

=== October ===
After the international break, play resumed on 2 October and Madrid's winning run came to an end after a 1–1 home draw against Osasuna, with Vinícius scoring the only goal for the team. Three days later, goals from Rodrygo and Vinícius gave Madrid a 2–1 home win over Shakhtar Donetsk in the third matchday of the Champions League. On 8 October, Madrid registered a 1–0 win at Getafe, with the lone goal being scored by Éder Militão in the third minute. Three days later, Real played Shakhtar Donetsk in a Champions League game in Poland and came away with a 1–1 draw, thanks to an injury time goal from Rüdiger, which also officially qualified them for the round of 16. On 16 October, Madrid won the first El Clásico of the season, beating Barcelona 3–1 at the Santiago Bernabéu with goals from Benzema, Valverde and Rodrygo. Three days later, Madrid defeated Elche 3–0 away from home, with Valverde, Benzema and Asensio on the scoresheet. On 22 October, Sevilla was beaten at the Bernabéu, as goals from Modrić, Vázquez and Valverde gave Madrid a suffered 3–1 victory. Three days later, Madrid got defeated 2–3 in an away Champions League game against RB Leipzig, with the two goals being scored by Vinícius and Rodrygo. This loss was their first in the season, also ending the team's twenty-game unbeaten streak. On 30 October, Madrid dropped points against Girona at home. The game ended tied at 1–1, with Vinícius initially giving Real the lead before Cristhian Stuani equalised it with a penalty for the guests.

=== November ===
On the second day of the new month, Real Madrid produced a 5–1 home victory over Celtic in the Champions League and advanced to the round of 16 as group winners. Modrić, Rodrygo, Asensio, Vinícius and Valverde each scored one goal. On 7 November, the league match at Rayo Vallecano ended in a 2–3 loss, as Madrid gave away the league's number one spot to their rivals Barcelona. Modrić and Militão scored to give Madrid a temporary 2–1 lead. This was Real's first La Liga loss of the season. Three days later, Madrid managed to beat Cádiz in their last game before the World Cup break, winning 2–1 at home after Militão's header and a strike from Toni Kroos.

=== December ===
Ancelotti's side returned to action on 30 December after a 1.5 month break for the World Cup and managed to beat Real Valladolid away 2–0 in what was the only match of the month, with Benzema scoring a late brace to end the year on a high.

=== January ===
The new year kicked off with the start of the Copa del Rey on 3 January, which Madrid joined in the round of 32. The team travelled to fourth-tier Cacereño, winning there 1–0, thanks to a solo Rodrygo goal, and progressing to the round of 16. Four days later, Madrid lost 1–2 in the away league match against Villarreal, with the only goal coming from Benzema. This match also marked the first time in its history that the club fielded a line-up with no Spanish players. On 11 January, Madrid defeated Valencia 4–3 in a penalty shootout of the first 2023 Supercopa de España semi-final to advance to the final, after the extra time ended 1–1, as Benzema scored the only goal for Ancelotti's team. On 15 January, Madrid suffered a 1–3 defeat in the Supercopa de España final against Barcelona, with the only goal coming from a Benzema strike in injury time. This was Real's first Clásico loss in a Spanish Super Cup match since August 2012. Four days later, Madrid progressed to the quarter-finals of the Copa del Rey, thanks to a 3–2 comeback win over Villarreal, trailing 0–2 at half-time. The goals came from Vinícius, Militão and Dani Ceballos, as Real ended a six-match winless run at the Estadio de la Cerámica. On 22 January, Benzema and Kroos scored two goals to give Madrid a 2–0 El Viejo Clásico win at Athletic Bilbao. Four days later, Madrid produced a comeback versus Atlético Madrid at home, winning 3–1 to book their place in the Copa del Rey semi-finals, thanks to a score-equaling Rodrygo shot and overtime goals from Benzema and Vinícius. On 29 January, Madrid's home game against Real Sociedad ended in a goalless stalemate, as Real failed to score for the first time in the season.

=== February ===
The month began for Madrid on 2 February, after Asensio and Vinícius scored twice in the second half for a 2–0 win over Valencia at the Bernabéu. Three days later, Madrid suffered their third league defeat of the season, losing 0–1 away to Mallorca. On 8 February, goals from Vinícius, Valverde, Rodrygo and Sergio Arribas, a debut one for the club's academy player, helped Madrid to take a smashing 4–1 victory over Al Ahly in the semi-finals of the FIFA Club World Cup. Three days later, Madrid claimed a record-extending fifth Club World Cup title, beating Al-Hilal 5–3 in the final, with braces from Vinícius and Valverde and a Benzema goal. On 15 February, Madrid got a 4–0 home win over Elche, with Asensio, Benzema twice from the penalty spot and Modrić all on the scoresheet. Three days later, two late goals from Valverde and Asensio earned Madrid a 2–0 league win at Osasuna. On 21 February, Madrid met Liverpool at the Anfield in the first leg of the Champions League round of 16. Trailing 0–2 in the very beginning of the match, Real managed to take a crushing 5–2 comeback victory, after two first-half goals from Vinícius were followed up by a Militão header and a brace from Benzema. Four days later, the third Madrid derby of the season against Atlético Madrid ended in a 1–1 draw at the Bernabéu, thanks to an equalizer by academy player Álvaro Rodríguez, who scored his debut goal for the first team.

=== March ===
On the second day of the new month, the third Clásico of the season was lost 0–1 to Barcelona at home in the first leg of the Copa del Rey semi-finals, with an own goal from Militão being the only goal of the match. Three days later, Madrid dropped points in a 0–0 away draw against Real Betis. On 11 March, Madrid ended their three-match winless streak, beating Espanyol 3–1 at home, thanks to goals from Vinícius, Militão and Asensio. Four days later, the home leg of the Champions League round of 16 was won 1–0 (6–2 on aggregate), with a Benzema goal sending Madrid through to the quarter-finals. On 19 March, the crucial league Clásico was lost 1–2 away from home, with Real having opened the scoring via an own goal.

=== April ===
Madrid kicked off the month with a 6–0 home win over Real Valladolid, as goal from Rodrygo and Benzema first-half hat-trick were followed by strikes from Asensio and Vázquez. On 5 April, Real achieved a 4–0 away victory over Barcelona in the return leg of the Copa del Rey semi-finals and advanced to the final for the first time since 2014. Vinícius opened the scoring and Benzema then got his second hat-trick in a row. The final scoreline marked the first time that Madrid had scored at least four goals against Barcelona in any competition since a 4–1 La Liga victory in May 2008, and for the first time at the Camp Nou since a 5–1 league win in January 1963. Three days later, Madrid suffered a 2–3 home loss to Villarreal, despite having been 2–1 up after an own goal and a Vinícius strike. On 12 April, Madrid hosted Chelsea at home in the first leg of the Champions League quarter-finals and beat the English side 2–0, as Benzema and Asensio got on the scoresheet. Three days later, goals from Nacho and Asensio gave Madrid a 2–0 away league win over Cádiz. On 18 April, Madrid played the Champions League quarter-finals return leg against Chelsea, getting another 2–0 win and progressing to the semi-finals 4–0 on aggregate, thanks to a Rodrygo brace. Four days later, Ancelotti's side managed to beat Celta Vigo 2–0 at the Bernabéu with goals from Asensio and Militão. On 25 April, Madrid suffered a 2–4 away defeat against Girona, with the goals being scored by Vinícius and Vazquez. Four days later, Benzema scored another first-half hat-trick, which was followed by a goal from Rodrygo, as Madrid sealed a 4–2 home win over Almería.

=== May ===
The month began on a sour note on 2 May, when Real was beaten 0–2 by Real Sociedad at the Anoeta and dropped down to third place in the La Liga standings. But, fortunes improved four days later, when a brace from Rodrygo helped Madrid to triumph 2–1 over Osasuna in the Copa del Rey final at the Estadio La Cartuja in Seville for their first La Copa in 9 years, and Ancelotti's second with the club. On 9 May, Madrid hosted Manchester City in the Champions League semi-finals first leg, rematching the last season's encounter at the same stage of the competition. The match ended in a 1–1 draw, as Vinícius scored a wondergoal from outside the box. Four days later, an Asensio goal secured three points against Getafe. On 17 May, the return leg of the Champions League semi-final against Manchester City was played and Real were beaten by a scoreline of 0–4, knocking them out of the competition. Four days later, Madrid lost an away game versus Valencia 0–1. On 24 May, Ancelotti's team managed to beat Rayo Vallecano 2–1 at home, as Benzema and Rodrygo got on the scoresheet. A Rodrygo brace secured Madrid three points in a 2–1 win at Sevilla on 27 May.

=== June ===
In the last game of the season, on 4 June, Benzema scored his last goal for the club as the match against Athletic Bilbao ended in a 1–1 draw, which settled Madrid at the second place in the league.

== Players ==
Note: Flags indicate national team as defined under FIFA eligibility rules; some limited exceptions apply. Players may hold more than one non-FIFA nationality.

No.	Pos.	Nation	Player
1	GK	BEL	Thibaut Courtois
2	DF	ESP	Dani Carvajal (4th captain)
3	DF	BRA	Éder Militão
4	DF	AUT	David Alaba
5	DF	ESP	Jesús Vallejo
6	DF	ESP	Nacho (vice-captain)
7	FW	BEL	Eden Hazard
8	MF	GER	Toni Kroos
9	FW	FRA	Karim Benzema (captain)
10	MF	CRO	Luka Modrić (3rd captain)
11	FW	ESP	Marco Asensio
12	MF	FRA	Eduardo Camavinga

No.	Pos.	Nation	Player
13	GK	UKR	Andriy Lunin
14	MF	BRA	Casemiro (until 19 August 2022)
15	MF	URU	Federico Valverde
16	DF	ESP	Álvaro Odriozola
17	DF	ESP	Lucas Vázquez
18	MF	FRA	Aurélien Tchouaméni
19	MF	ESP	Dani Ceballos
20	FW	BRA	Vinícius Júnior
21	FW	BRA	Rodrygo
22	DF	GER	Antonio Rüdiger
23	DF	FRA	Ferland Mendy
24	FW	DOM	Mariano Díaz

== Transfers ==
=== In ===
Date	Pos.	Player	From	Type	Ref.
1 July 2022	DF	(Spain) Álvaro Odriozola	(Italy) Fiorentina	End of loan	
1 July 2022	DF	(Germany) Antonio Rüdiger	(England) Chelsea	Free transfer	
1 July 2022	MF	(France) Aurélien Tchouaméni	(France) Monaco	Transfer	
1 July 2022	FW	(Spain) Borja Mayoral	Getafe	End of loan	

=== Out ===
Date	Pos.	Player	To	Type	Ref.
1 July 2022	DF	(Brazil) Marcelo	(Greece) Olympiacos	End of contract	
1 July 2022	MF	(Spain) Isco	(Spain) Sevilla	End of contract	
1 July 2022	FW	(Wales) Gareth Bale	(United States) Los Angeles	End of contract	
8 July 2022	FW	(Serbia) Luka Jović	(Italy) Fiorentina	Transfer	
1 August 2022	FW	(Spain) Borja Mayoral	Getafe	Transfer	
19 August 2022	MF	(Brazil) Casemiro	(England) Manchester United	Transfer	

== Pre-season and friendlies ==
On 10 June 2022, Real Madrid announced they would travel to the United States to participate in the pre-season Soccer Champions Tour. El Clásico against Barcelona marked the second time the teams face each other on American soil after the 2017 International Champions Cup match.

23 July 2022 1	Real Madrid	0–1	Barcelona	Paradise, United States
20:06 UTC−7		Report	Raphinha 29'	Stadium: Allegiant Stadium; Attendance: 61,299; Referee: Mark Allatin (United States)

26 July 2022 2	Real Madrid	2–2	América	San Francisco, United States
19:30 UTC−7	Benzema 22'; Hazard 54' (pen.)	Report	Martín 5'; Fidalgo 82' (pen.)	Stadium: Oracle Park; Attendance: 40,630; Referee: Joseph Dickerson (United States)

30 July 2022 3	Real Madrid	2–0	Juventus	Pasadena, United States
19:00 UTC−7	Benzema 19' (pen.); Asensio 69'	Report		Stadium: Rose Bowl; Attendance: 93,702; Referee: Michael Radchuk (United States)

15 December 2022 4	Real Madrid	1–1	Leganés	Madrid
11:00 UTC+1	Kroos	Report	Undabarrena	Stadium: Ciudad Real Madrid; Attendance: 0 (Note: The match was played behind closed doors.)
Note: The match was played in two thirty-minute halves.

23 December 2022 5	Real Madrid	0–0	Getafe	Madrid
11:00 UTC+1		Report		Stadium: Ciudad Real Madrid; Attendance: 0
Note: The match was played in two thirty-minute halves.

== Competitions ==
=== Overview ===
Competition	First match	Last match	Starting round	Final position	Record							
Competition	First match	Last match	Starting round	Final position	Pld	W	D	L	GF	GA	GD	Win %
La Liga	14 August 2022	4 June 2023	Matchday 1	2nd	38	24	6	8	75	36	+39	63.16
Copa del Rey	3 January 2023	6 May 2023	Round of 32	Winners	6	5	0	1	13	5	+8	83.33
Supercopa de España	11 January 2023	15 January 2023	Semi-finals	Runners-up	2	0	1	1	2	4	−2	0.00
UEFA Champions League	6 September 2022	17 May 2023	Group stage	Semi-finals	12	8	2	2	26	13	+13	66.67
UEFA Super Cup	10 August 2022		Final	Winners	1	1	0	0	2	0	+2	100.00
FIFA Club World Cup	8 February 2023	11 February 2023	Semi-finals	Winners	2	2	0	0	9	4	+5	100.00
Total					61	40	9	12	127	62	+65	65.57

Source: Soccerway

=== La Liga ===
==== League table ====
Pos	Team	Pld	W	D	L	GF	GA	GD	Pts	Qualification or relegation
1	Barcelona (C)	38	28	4	6	70	20	+50	88	Qualification for the Champions League group stage
2	Real Madrid	38	24	6	8	75	36	+39	78	Qualification for the Champions League group stage
3	Atlético Madrid	38	23	8	7	70	33	+37	77	Qualification for the Champions League group stage
4	Real Sociedad	38	21	8	9	51	35	+16	71	Qualification for the Champions League group stage
5	Villarreal	38	19	7	12	59	40	+19	64	Qualification for the Europa League group stage

Source: LaLiga Santander
Rules for classification: 1) Points; 2) Head-to-head points; 3) Head-to-head goal difference; 4) Goal difference; 5) Goals scored; 6) Fair-play points (Note: Head-to-head record is used only after all the matches between the teams in question have been played)
(C) Champions

==== Results summary ====
Overall								Home						Away					
Pld	W	D	L	GF	GA	GD	Pts	W	D	L	GF	GA	GD	W	D	L	GF	GA	GD
38	24	6	8	75	36	+39	78	13	5	1	44	16	+28	11	1	7	31	20	+11

Source: La Liga

==== Results by round ====
Round	1	2	3	4	5	6	7	8	9	10	11	12	13	14	15	16	17	18	19	20	21	22	23	24	25	26	27	28	29	30	31	32	33	34	35	36	37	38
Ground	A	A	A	H	H	A	H	A	H	A	H	H	A	H	A	A	A	H	H	A	H	A	H	A	H	A	H	H	A	H	A	H	A	H	A	H	A	H
Result	W	W	W	W	W	W	D	W	W	W	W	D	L	W	W	L	W	D	W	L	W	W	D	D	W	L	W	L	W	W	L	W	L	W	L	W	W	D
Position	4	2	1	1	1	1	2	2	1	1	1	1	2	2	2	2	2	2	2	2	2	2	2	2	2	2	2	2	2	2	2	2	3	2	3	2	2	2

Source: La Liga
A = Away; H = Home; W = Win; D = Draw; L = Loss

==== Matches ====
The league fixtures were announced on 23 June 2022.

14 August 2022 1	Almería	1–2	Real Madrid	Almería
22:00 UTC+2	Ramazani 6'	Report	Vázquez 61'; Alaba 75'	Stadium: Power Horse Stadium; Attendance: 6,103; Referee: Juan Martínez Munuera

20 August 2022 2	Celta Vigo	1–4	Real Madrid	Vigo
22:00 UTC+2	Aspas 23' (pen.)	Report	Benzema 14' (pen.); Modrić 42'; Vinícius 56'; Valverde 66'	Stadium: Abanca-Balaídos; Attendance: 15,681; Referee: Jesús Gil Manzano

28 August 2022 3	Espanyol	1–3	Real Madrid	Cornellà de Llobregat
22:00 UTC+2	Joselu 43'; Lecomte (red card) 90+6'	Report	Vinícius 12'; Benzema 88', 90+10'	Stadium: RCDE Stadium; Attendance: 25,778; Referee: Mario Melero López

3 September 2022 4	Real Madrid	2–1	Real Betis	Madrid
16:15 UTC+2	Vinícius 9'; Rodrygo 65'	Report	Canales 17'	Stadium: Santiago Bernabéu; Attendance: 58,579; Referee: José María Sánchez Martínez

11 September 2022 5	Real Madrid	4–1	Mallorca	Madrid
14:00 UTC+2	Valverde 45+3'; Vinícius 72'; Rodrygo 89'; Rüdiger 90+3'	Report	Muriqi 35'	Stadium: Santiago Bernabéu; Attendance: 54,816; Referee: Jorge Figueroa Vázquez

18 September 2022 6	Atlético Madrid	1–2	Real Madrid	Madrid
21:00 UTC+2	Hermoso 83', (yellow card) 89' (yellow-red card) 90+1'	Report	Rodrygo 18'; Valverde 36'	Stadium: Cívitas Metropolitano; Attendance: 66,881; Referee: José Luis Munuera Montero

2 October 2022 7	Real Madrid	1–1	Osasuna	Madrid
21:00 UTC+2	Vinícius 42'	Report	Kike 50'; D. García (red card) 78'	Stadium: Santiago Bernabéu; Attendance: 55,410; Referee: Guillermo Cuadra Fernández

8 October 2022 8	Getafe	0–1	Real Madrid	Getafe
21:00 UTC+2		Report	Militão 3'	Stadium: Coliseum Alfonso Pérez; Attendance: 14,502; Referee: Antonio Mateu Lahoz

16 October 2022 9	Real Madrid	3–1	Barcelona	Madrid
16:15 UTC+2	Benzema 12'; Valverde 35'; Rodrygo 90+1' (pen.)	Report	Torres 83'	Stadium: Santiago Bernabéu; Attendance: 62,876; Referee: José María Sánchez Martínez

19 October 2022 10	Elche	0–3	Real Madrid	Elche
21:00 UTC+2		Report	Valverde 11'; Benzema 75'; Asensio 89'	Stadium: Martínez Valero; Attendance: 30,236; Referee: Jesús Gil Manzano

22 October 2022 11	Real Madrid	3–1	Sevilla	Madrid
21:00 UTC+2	Modrić 5'; Vázquez 79'; Valverde 81'	Report	Lamela 54'	Stadium: Santiago Bernabéu; Attendance: 59,625; Referee: Alejandro Hernández Hernández

30 October 2022 12	Real Madrid	1–1	Girona	Madrid
16:15 UTC+1	Kroos (yellow card) 55' (yellow-red card) 90+1'; Vinícius 70'	Report	Stuani 80' (pen.)	Stadium: Santiago Bernabéu; Attendance: 58,367; Referee: Mario Melero López

7 November 2022 13	Rayo Vallecano	3–2	Real Madrid	Madrid
21:00 UTC+1	Comesaña 5'; A. García 44'; Trejo 67' (pen.)	Report	Modrić 37' (pen.); Militão 41'	Stadium: Vallecas; Attendance: 14,216; Referee: Juan Martínez Munuera

10 November 2022 14	Real Madrid	2–1	Cádiz	Madrid
21:30 UTC+1	Militão 40'; Kroos 70'	Report	Pérez 82'	Stadium: Santiago Bernabéu; Attendance: 53,190; Referee: César Soto Grado

30 December 2022 15	Valladolid	0–2	Real Madrid	Valladolid
21:30 UTC+1	León (red card) 82'	Report	Benzema 83' (pen.), 89'	Stadium: José Zorrilla; Attendance: 25,950; Referee: José Luis Munuera Montero

7 January 2023 16	Villarreal	2–1	Real Madrid	Villarreal
16:15 UTC+1	Pino 47'; Gerard 63' (pen.)	Report	Benzema 60' (pen.)	Stadium: Estadio de la Cerámica; Attendance: 21,088; Referee: César Soto Grado

22 January 2023 17	Athletic Bilbao	0–2	Real Madrid	Bilbao
21:00 UTC+1		Report	Benzema 24'; Kroos 90'	Stadium: San Mamés; Attendance: 49,402; Referee: José María Sánchez Martínez

29 January 2023 18	Real Madrid	0–0	Real Sociedad	Madrid
21:00 UTC+1		Report		Stadium: Santiago Bernabéu; Attendance: 58,129; Referee: Mario Melero López

2 February 2023 19	Real Madrid	2–0	Valencia	Madrid
21:00 UTC+1	Asensio 52'; Vinícius 55'	Report	Gabriel (red card) 72'	Stadium: Santiago Bernabéu; Attendance: 51,926; Referee: Javier Alberola Rojas
Note: The match date was pushed back due to both teams' involvement in the Supercopa de España.

5 February 2023 20	Mallorca	1–0	Real Madrid	Palma
14:00 UTC+1	Nacho 13' (o.g.)	Report		Stadium: Mallorca Son Moix; Attendance: 18,258; Referee: Alejandro Hernández Hernández

15 February 2023 21	Real Madrid	4–0	Elche	Madrid
21:00 UTC+1	Asensio 8'; Benzema 31' (pen.), 45+2' (pen.); Modrić 80'	Report		Stadium: Santiago Bernabéu; Attendance: 44,319; Referee: Ricardo de Burgos Bengoetxea
Note: The match date was pushed back due to Real Madrid's involvement in the FIFA Club World Cup.

18 February 2023 22	Osasuna	0–2	Real Madrid	Pamplona
21:00 UTC+1		Report	Valverde 78'; Asensio 90+2'	Stadium: El Sadar; Attendance: 21,668; Referee: José Luis Munuera Montero

25 February 2023 23	Real Madrid	1–1	Atlético Madrid	Madrid
18:30 UTC+1	Rodríguez 85'	Report	Correa (red card) 64'; Giménez 78'	Stadium: Santiago Bernabéu; Attendance: 64,721; Referee: Jesús Gil Manzano

5 March 2023 24	Real Betis	0–0	Real Madrid	Seville
21:00 UTC+1		Report		Stadium: Benito Villamarín; Attendance: 52,212; Referee: César Soto Grado

11 March 2023 25	Real Madrid	3–1	Espanyol	Madrid
14:00 UTC+1	Vinícius 22'; Militão 39'; Asensio 90+3'	Report	Joselu 8'	Stadium: Santiago Bernabéu; Attendance: 59,872; Referee: Jorge Figueroa Vázquez

19 March 2023 26	Barcelona	2–1	Real Madrid	Barcelona
21:00 UTC+1	Roberto 45'; Kessié 90+2'	Report	Araújo 9' (o.g.)	Stadium: Spotify Camp Nou; Attendance: 95,745; Referee: Ricardo de Burgos Bengoetxea

2 April 2023 27	Real Madrid	6–0	Valladolid	Madrid
16:15 UTC+2	Rodrygo 22'; Benzema 29', 32', 36'; Asensio 73'; Vázquez 90+1'	Report		Stadium: Santiago Bernabéu; Attendance: 59,400; Referee: Juan Luis Pulido Santana

8 April 2023 28	Real Madrid	2–3	Villarreal	Madrid
21:00 UTC+2	Torres 16' (o.g.); Vinícius 48'	Report	Chukwueze 39', 80'; Morales 70'	Stadium: Santiago Bernabéu; Attendance: 57,887; Referee: Javier Alberola Rojas

15 April 2023 29	Cádiz	0–2	Real Madrid	Cádiz
21:00 UTC+2		Report	Nacho 72'; Asensio 76'	Stadium: Nuevo Mirandilla; Attendance: 19,833; Referee: Jesús Gil Manzano

22 April 2023 30	Real Madrid	2–0	Celta Vigo	Madrid
21:00 UTC+2	Asensio 42'; Militão 48'	Report		Stadium: Santiago Bernabéu; Attendance: 60,386; Referee: Antonio Mateu Lahoz

25 April 2023 31	Girona	4–2	Real Madrid	Girona
19:30 UTC+2	Castellanos 12', 24', 46', 62'	Report	Vinícius 34'; Vázquez 85'	Stadium: Montilivi; Attendance: 13,306; Referee: Javier Iglesias Villanueva

29 April 2023 32	Real Madrid	4–2	Almería	Madrid
18:30 UTC+2	Benzema 5', 17', 42' (pen.); Rodrygo 47'	Report	Lázaro 45+1'; Robertone 61'	Stadium: Santiago Bernabéu; Attendance: 58,036; Referee: Guillermo Cuadra Fernández

2 May 2023 33	Real Sociedad	2–0	Real Madrid	San Sebastián
22:00 UTC+2	Kubo 47'; Barrenetxea 85'	Report	Carvajal (yellow card) 53' (yellow-red card) 61'	Stadium: Reale Arena; Attendance: 35,314; Referee: Juan Luis Pulido Santana

13 May 2023 34	Real Madrid	1–0	Getafe	Madrid
21:00 UTC+2	Asensio 70'	Report		Stadium: Santiago Bernabéu; Attendance: 52,201; Referee: Juan Martínez Munuera

21 May 2023 35	Valencia	1–0	Real Madrid	Valencia
18:30 UTC+2	López 33'	Report	Vinícius (red card) 90+7'	Stadium: Mestalla; Attendance: 46,002; Referee: Ricardo de Burgos Bengoetxea

24 May 2023 36	Real Madrid	2–1	Rayo Vallecano	Madrid
19:30 UTC+2	Benzema 31'; Rodrygo 89'	Report	De Tomás 84'	Stadium: Santiago Bernabéu; Attendance: 45,811; Referee: Jesús Gil Manzano

27 May 2023 37	Sevilla	1–2	Real Madrid	Seville
19:00 UTC+2	Mir 3'; Acuña (red card) 83'	Report	Rodrygo 29', 69'	Stadium: Ramón Sánchez Pizjuán; Attendance: 29,856; Referee: César Soto Grado

4 June 2023 38	Real Madrid	1–1	Athletic Bilbao	Madrid
18:30 UTC+2	Benzema 72' (pen.)	Report	Sancet 49'	Stadium: Santiago Bernabéu; Attendance: 60,781; Referee: Isidro Díaz de Mera Escuderos

=== Copa del Rey ===
Madrid entered the tournament in the round of 32, as they had qualified for the 2023 Supercopa de España.

3 January 2023 Round of 32	Cacereño	0–1	Real Madrid	Cáceres
21:00 UTC+1		Report	Rodrygo 69'	Stadium: Príncipe Felipe; Attendance: 15,000; Referee: Guillermo Cuadra Fernández

19 January 2023 Round of 16	Villarreal	2–3	Real Madrid	Villarreal
21:00 UTC+1	Capoue 4'; Chukwueze 42'	Report	Vinícius 57'; Militão 69'; Ceballos 86'	Stadium: Estadio de la Cerámica; Attendance: 20,124; Referee: Jesús Gil Manzano

26 January 2023 Quarter-finals	Real Madrid	3–1 (a.e.t.)	Atlético Madrid	Madrid
21:00 UTC+1	Rodrygo 79'; Benzema 104'; Vinícius 120+1'	Report	Morata 19'; Savić (yellow card) 96' (yellow-red card) 99'	Stadium: Santiago Bernabéu; Attendance: 68,000; Referee: César Soto Grado

2 March 2023 Semi-finals, 1st leg	Real Madrid	0–1	Barcelona	Madrid
21:00 UTC+1		Report	Militão 26' (o.g.)	Stadium: Santiago Bernabéu; Attendance: 81,044; Referee: José Luis Munuera Montero

5 April 2023 Semi-finals, 2nd leg	Barcelona	0–4 (1–4 agg.)	Real Madrid	Barcelona
21:00 UTC+2		Report	Vinícius 45+1'; Benzema 50', 58' (pen.), 81'	Stadium: Spotify Camp Nou; Attendance: 94,902; Referee: Juan Martínez Munuera

6 May 2023 Final	Real Madrid	2–1	Osasuna	Seville
22:00 UTC+2	Rodrygo 2', 70'	Report	Torró 58'	Stadium: La Cartuja; Attendance: 55,579; Referee: José María Sánchez Martínez

=== Supercopa de España ===
11 January 2023 Semi-finals	Real Madrid	1–1 (a.e.t.) (4–3 p)	Valencia	Riyadh, Saudi Arabia
22:00 UTC+3	Benzema 39' (pen.)	Report	Lino 46'	Stadium: King Fahd International Stadium; Attendance: 50,492; Referee: Alejandro Hernández Hernández
	Penalties
	Benzema (penalty scored); Modrić (penalty scored); Kroos (penalty scored); Asensio (penalty scored)		(penalty scored) Cavani; (penalty missed) Cömert; (penalty scored) Moriba; (penalty scored) Guillamón; (penalty missed) Gayà

15 January 2023 Final	Real Madrid	1–3	Barcelona	Riyadh, Saudi Arabia
22:00 UTC+3	Benzema 90+3'	Report	Gavi 33'; Lewandowski 45'; Pedri 69'	Stadium: King Fahd International Stadium; Attendance: 57,340; Referee: Ricardo de Burgos Bengoetxea

=== UEFA Champions League ===
==== Group stage ====
The group stage draw was held on 25 August 2022.

Pos	Team	Pld	W	D	L	GF	GA	GD	Pts	Qualification	RMA	RBL	SHK	CEL
1	(Spain) Real Madrid	6	4	1	1	15	6	+9	13	Advance to knockout phase	—	2–0	2–1	5–1
2	(Germany) RB Leipzig	6	4	0	2	13	9	+4	12	Advance to knockout phase	3–2	—	1–4	3–1
3	(Ukraine) Shakhtar Donetsk	6	1	3	2	8	10	−2	6	Transfer to Europa League	1–1	0–4	—	1–1
4	(Scotland) Celtic	6	0	2	4	4	15	−11	2		0–3	0–2	1–1	—

Source: UEFA
Rules for classification: Group stage tiebreakers

6 September 2022 1	Celtic (Scotland)	0–3	(Spain) Real Madrid	Glasgow, Scotland
20:00 UTC+1		Report	Vinícius 56'; Modrić 60'; Hazard 77'	Stadium: Celtic Park; Attendance: 57,057; Referee: Sandro Schärer (Switzerland)

14 September 2022 2	Real Madrid (Spain)	2–0	(Germany) RB Leipzig	Madrid, Spain
21:00 UTC+2	Valverde 80'; Asensio 90+1'	Report		Stadium: Santiago Bernabéu; Attendance: 54,289; Referee: Maurizio Mariani (Italy)

5 October 2022 3	Real Madrid (Spain)	2–1	(Ukraine) Shakhtar Donetsk	Madrid, Spain
21:00 UTC+2	Rodrygo 13'; Vinícius 28'	Report	Zubkov 39'	Stadium: Santiago Bernabéu; Attendance: 56,011; Referee: Ivan Kružliak (Slovakia)

11 October 2022 4	Shakhtar Donetsk (Ukraine)	1–1	(Spain) Real Madrid	Warsaw, Poland (Note: Due to the Russian invasion of Ukraine, Ukrainian teams are required to play their home matches at neutral venues until further notice. Therefore, Shakhtar Donetsk have played their home matches at Stadion Wojska Polskiego, Warsaw, Poland, instead of their regular stadium, the Donbas Arena in Donetsk.)
21:00 UTC+2	Zubkov 46'	Report	Rüdiger 90+5'	Stadium: Stadion Wojska Polskiego; Attendance: 29,030; Referee: Orel Grinfeld (Israel)

25 October 2022 5	RB Leipzig (Germany)	3–2	(Spain) Real Madrid	Leipzig, Germany
21:00 UTC+2	Gvardiol 13'; Nkunku 18'; Werner 81'	Report	Vinícius 44'; Rodrygo 90+3' (pen.)	Stadium: Red Bull Arena; Attendance: 45,228; Referee: Daniele Orsato (Italy)

2 November 2022 6	Real Madrid (Spain)	5–1	(Scotland) Celtic	Madrid, Spain
18:45 UTC+1	Modrić 6' (pen.); Rodrygo 21' (pen.); Asensio 51'; Vinícius 61'; Valverde 71'	Report	Jota 84'	Stadium: Santiago Bernabéu; Attendance: 52,511; Referee: Stéphanie Frappart (France)

==== Knockout phase ====
===== Round of 16 =====
The draw for the round of 16 was held on 7 November 2022.

21 February 2023 First leg	Liverpool (England)	2–5	(Spain) Real Madrid	Liverpool, England
20:00 UTC+0	Núñez 4'; Salah 14'	Report	Vinícius 21', 36'; Militão 47'; Benzema 55', 67'	Stadium: Anfield; Attendance: 52,337; Referee: István Kovács (Romania)

15 March 2023 Second leg	Real Madrid (Spain)	1–0 (6–2 agg.)	(England) Liverpool	Madrid, Spain
21:00 UTC+1	Benzema 78'	Report		Stadium: Santiago Bernabéu; Attendance: 63,127; Referee: Felix Zwayer (Germany)

===== Quarter-finals =====
The draw for the quarter-finals and semi-finals was held on 17 March 2023.

12 April 2023 First leg	Real Madrid (Spain)	2–0	(England) Chelsea	Madrid, Spain
21:00 UTC+2	Benzema 21'; Asensio 74'	Report	Chilwell (red card) 59'	Stadium: Santiago Bernabéu; Attendance: 63,142; Referee: François Letexier (France)

18 April 2023 Second leg	Chelsea (England)	0–2 (0–4 agg.)	(Spain) Real Madrid	London, England
20:00 UTC+1		Report	Rodrygo 58', 80'	Stadium: Stamford Bridge; Attendance: 39,453; Referee: Daniele Orsato (Italy)

===== Semi-finals =====
9 May 2023 First leg	Real Madrid (Spain)	1–1	(England) Manchester City	Madrid, Spain
21:00 UTC+2	Vinícius 36'	Report	De Bruyne 67'	Stadium: Santiago Bernabéu; Attendance: 63,485; Referee: Artur Soares Dias (Portugal)

17 May 2023 Second leg	Manchester City (England)	4–0 (5–1 agg.)	(Spain) Real Madrid	Manchester, England
20:00 UTC+1	Silva 23', 37'; Akanji 76'; Álvarez 90+1'	Report		Stadium: City of Manchester Stadium; Attendance: 52,313; Referee: Szymon Marciniak (Poland)

=== UEFA Super Cup ===
10 August 2022	Real Madrid (Spain)	2–0	(Germany) Eintracht Frankfurt	Helsinki, Finland
22:00 UTC+3	Alaba 37'; Benzema 65'	Report		Stadium: Olympic Stadium; Attendance: 31,042; Referee: Michael Oliver (England)

=== FIFA Club World Cup ===
Madrid entered the tournament in the semi-finals as the UEFA representative.

8 February 2023 Semi-finals	Al Ahly (Egypt)	1–4	(Spain) Real Madrid	Rabat, Morocco
20:00 UTC+1	Maâloul 65' (pen.)	Report	Vinícius 42'; Valverde 46'; Rodrygo 90+2'; Arribas 90+8'	Stadium: Prince Moulay Abdellah Stadium; Attendance: 43,508; Referee: Andrés Matonte (Uruguay)

11 February 2023 Final	Real Madrid (Spain)	5–3	(Saudi Arabia) Al-Hilal	Rabat, Morocco
20:00 UTC+1	Vinícius 13', 69'; Valverde 18', 58'; Benzema 54'	Report	Marega 26'; Vietto 63', 79'	Stadium: Prince Moulay Abdellah Stadium; Attendance: 44,439; Referee: Anthony Taylor (England)

== Statistics ==
=== Squad statistics ===
No.	Pos	Nat	Player	Total		La Liga		Copa del Rey		Champions League		Other^{1}	
No.	Pos	Nat	Player	Apps	Goals	Apps	Goals	Apps	Goals	Apps	Goals	Apps	Goals
1	GK	(Belgium)	Thibaut Courtois	49	0	31	0	5	0	10	0	3	0
2	DF	(Spain)	Dani Carvajal	45	0	27	0	3	0	11	0	4	0
3	DF	(Brazil)	Éder Militão	50	7	32	5	6	1	9	1	3	0
4	DF	(Austria)	David Alaba	39	2	23	1	2	0	11	0	3	1
5	DF	(Spain)	Jesús Vallejo	4	0	1	0	1	0	1	0	1	0
6	DF	(Spain)	Nacho	44	1	27	1	5	0	8	0	4	0
7	MF	(Belgium)	Eden Hazard	11	1	6	0	1	0	3	1	1	0
8	MF	(Germany)	Toni Kroos	52	2	30	2	5	0	12	0	5	0
9	FW	(France)	Karim Benzema	43	31	24	19	5	4	10	4	4	4
10	MF	(Croatia)	Luka Modrić	51	6	33	4	4	0	10	2	4	0
11	FW	(Spain)	Marco Asensio	51	12	31	9	5	0	12	3	3	0
12	MF	(France)	Eduardo Camavinga	59	0	37	0	6	0	11	0	5	0
13	GK	(Ukraine)	Andriy Lunin	12	0	7	0	1	0	2	0	2	0
14	MF	(Brazil)	Casemiro †	2	0	1	0	0	0	0	0	1	0
15	MF	(Uruguay)	Federico Valverde	56	12	34	7	6	0	11	2	5	3
16	DF	(Spain)	Álvaro Odriozola	6	0	3	0	2	0	0	0	1	0
17	FW	(Spain)	Lucas Vázquez	31	4	23	4	1	0	5	0	2	0
18	MF	(France)	Aurélien Tchouaméni	50	0	33	0	4	0	10	0	3	0
19	MF	(Spain)	Dani Ceballos	46	1	31	0	4	1	7	0	4	0
20	FW	(Brazil)	Vinícius Júnior	55	23	33	10	5	3	12	7	5	3
21	FW	(Brazil)	Rodrygo	56	19	34	9	6	4	12	5	4	1
22	DF	(Germany)	Antonio Rüdiger	53	2	33	1	5	0	10	1	5	0
23	DF	(France)	Ferland Mendy	28	0	18	0	2	0	5	0	3	0
24	FW	(Dominican Republic)	Mariano	12	0	9	0	0	0	1	0	2	0
31	MF	(Spain)	Mario Martín	1	0	0	0	1	0	0	0	0	0
33	MF	(Spain)	Sergio Arribas	4	1	2	0	1	0	0	0	1	1
39	FW	(Uruguay)	Álvaro Rodríguez	8	1	6	1	2	0	0	0	0	0

Source: FBREF

^{1} Includes Supercopa de España, UEFA Super Cup and FIFA Club World Cup.
^{†} Player left Madrid during the season.

=== Goals ===
Rank	Player	La Liga	Copa del Rey	Champions League	Supercopa	Super Cup	Club World Cup	Total
1	(France) Karim Benzema	19	4	4	2	1	1	31
2	(Brazil) Vinícius Júnior	10	3	7	0	0	3	23
3	(Brazil) Rodrygo	9	4	5	0	0	1	19
4	(Spain) Marco Asensio	9	0	3	0	0	0	12
4	(Uruguay) Federico Valverde	7	0	2	0	0	3	12
6	(Brazil) Éder Militão	5	1	1	0	0	0	7
7	(Croatia) Luka Modrić	4	0	2	0	0	0	6
8	(Spain) Lucas Vázquez	4	0	0	0	0	0	4
9	(Austria) David Alaba	1	0	0	0	1	0	2
9	(Germany) Toni Kroos	2	0	0	0	0	0	2
9	(Germany) Antonio Rüdiger	1	0	1	0	0	0	2
12	(Spain) Sergio Arribas	0	0	0	0	0	1	1
12	(Spain) Dani Ceballos	0	1	0	0	0	0	1
12	(Spain) Nacho	1	0	0	0	0	0	1
12	(Belgium) Eden Hazard	0	0	1	0	0	0	1
12	(Uruguay) Álvaro Rodríguez	1	0	0	0	0	0	1
Own goals		2	0	0	0	0	0	2
Total		75	13	26	2	2	9	127

Source: FBREF

=== Clean sheets ===
Rank	Name	La Liga	CdR	UCL	Other^{1}	Total
1	(Belgium) Thibaut Courtois	10	1	5	1	17
2	(Ukraine) Andriy Lunin	3	1	0	0	4
Total		13	2	5	1	21

Source: FBREF
^{1} Includes Supercopa de España, UEFA Super Cup and FIFA Club World Cup.

=== Disciplinary record ===
N	P	Nat.	Name	La Liga			CdR			UCL			Other^{1}			Total			Notes
N	P	Nat.	Name	Yellow card	Second yellow card	Red card	Yellow card	Second yellow card	Red card	Yellow card	Second yellow card	Red card	Yellow card	Second yellow card	Red card	Yellow card	Second yellow card	Red card	Notes
2	DF	(Spain)	Dani Carvajal	6	1		1			3						10	1		
8	MF	(Germany)	Toni Kroos		1					2						2	1		
20	FW	(Brazil)	Vinícius Júnior	10			5			1						16			
12	MF	(France)	Eduardo Camavinga	6			3			3			1			13			
3	DF	(Brazil)	Éder Militão	4			2			3						9			
6	DF	(Spain)	Nacho	7			1						1			9			
19	MF	(Spain)	Dani Ceballos	8			1									9			
10	MF	(Croatia)	Luka Modrić	7												7			
15	MF	(Uruguay)	Federico Valverde	2			3						1			6			
18	MF	(France)	Aurélien Tchouaméni	2			1						1			4			
21	FW	(Brazil)	Rodrygo	4												4			
23	DF	(France)	Ferland Mendy	2						1			1			4			
4	DF	(Austria)	David Alaba	3												3			
17	MF	(Spain)	Lucas Vázquez	2						1						3			
22	DF	(Germany)	Antonio Rüdiger	1			1									2			
24	FW	(Dominican Republic)	Mariano	2												2			
1	GK	(Belgium)	Thibaut Courtois				1									1			
9	FW	(France)	Karim Benzema	1												1			
11	FW	(Spain)	Marco Asensio	1												1			

Source: FBREF
Ordered by (red card) , (second yellow card) and (yellow card)
(yellow card) = Number of bookings; (second yellow card) = Number of sending offs after a second yellow card; (red card) = Number of sending offs by a direct red card.
^{1} Includes Supercopa de España, UEFA Super Cup and FIFA Club World Cup.

== Awards ==
=== La Liga Player of the Month ===
Month	Player	Ref.
September	(Uruguay) Federico Valverde	

=== Mahou Player of the Month ===
Month	Player	Ref.
August	(Brazil) Vinícius Júnior	
September	(Uruguay) Federico Valverde	
October	(Uruguay) Federico Valverde	
November	Not awarded due to the FIFA World Cup	
December	Not awarded due to the FIFA World Cup	
January	(France) Eduardo Camavinga	
February	(Brazil) Vinícius Júnior	
March	(Brazil) Vinícius Júnior	
April	(Brazil) Vinícius Júnior	

=== Annual Awards ===
Award	Player	Ref.
Mahou Player of the Season	(Brazil) Vinícius Júnior	
