= 2022–23 in German football =

Football in Germany
- Season: 2022–23

Men's football
- Bundesliga: Bayern Munich
- 2. Bundesliga: 1. FC Heidenheim
- 3. Liga: SV Elversberg
- DFB-Pokal: RB Leipzig
- DFL-Supercup: Bayern Munich

Women's football
- Frauen-Bundesliga: Bayern Munich
- 2. Frauen-Bundesliga: RB Leipzig
- DFB-Pokal: VfL Wolfsburg

The 2022–23 season was the 113th season of competitive football in Germany.

== Promotion and relegation ==
=== Pre-season ===
| League | Promoted to league | Relegated from league |
|---|---|---|
| Bundesliga | Schalke 04; Werder Bremen | Arminia Bielefeld; Greuther Fürth |
| 2. Bundesliga | 1. FC Magdeburg; Eintracht Braunschweig; 1. FC Kaiserslautern | Dynamo Dresden; Erzgebirge Aue; FC Ingolstadt |
| 3. Liga | SpVgg Bayreuth; SV Elversberg; Rot-Weiss Essen; VfB Oldenburg | Viktoria Berlin; Würzburger Kickers; TSV Havelse; Türkgücü München |
| Frauen-Bundesliga | SV Meppen; MSV Duisburg | SC Sand; Carl Zeiss Jena |
| 2. Frauen-Bundesliga | SC Freiburg II; 1. FC Köln II; Turbine Potsdam II | SV Elversberg; SV Henstedt-Ulzburg; Borussia Bocholt |

=== Post-season ===
| League | Promoted to league | Relegated from league |
|---|---|---|
| Bundesliga | 1. FC Heidenheim; Darmstadt 98 | Schalke 04; Hertha BSC |
| 2. Bundesliga | SV Elversberg; VfL Osnabrück; Wehen Wiesbaden | Arminia Bielefeld; Jahn Regensburg; SV Sandhausen |
| 3. Liga | VfB Lübeck; Preußen Münster; SSV Ulm; SpVgg Unterhaching | SV Meppen; VfB Oldenburg; FSV Zwickau; SpVgg Bayreuth |
| Frauen-Bundesliga | RB Leipzig; 1. FC Nürnberg | SV Meppen; Turbine Potsdam |
| 2. Frauen-Bundesliga | SV 67 Weinberg; Borussia Mönchengladbach; Hamburger SV | SC Freiburg II; 1. FC Köln II; Turbine Potsdam II |

== National teams ==
Win Draw Loss

=== Germany national football team ===
==== Kits ====
| Home | Away |

==== 2022–23 UEFA Nations League ====
===== 2022–23 UEFA Nations League A Group 3 =====
| Pos | Team | Pld | W | D | L | GF | GA | GD | Pts | Qualification or relegation | (Italy) | (Hungary) | (Germany) | (England) |
|---|---|---|---|---|---|---|---|---|---|---|---|---|---|---|
| 1 | Italy | 6 | 3 | 2 | 1 | 8 | 7 | +1 | 11 | Qualification for Nations League Finals | — | 2–1 | 1–1 | 1–0 |
| 2 | Hungary | 6 | 3 | 1 | 2 | 8 | 5 | +3 | 10 | | 0–2 | — | 1–1 | 1–0 |
| 3 | Germany | 6 | 1 | 4 | 1 | 11 | 9 | +2 | 7 | | 5–2 | 0–1 | — | 1–1 |
| 4 | England (R) | 6 | 0 | 3 | 3 | 4 | 10 | −6 | 3 | Relegation to League B | 0–0 | 0–4 | 3–3 | — |

Source: UEFA
Rules for classification: Tiebreakers
(R) Relegated

===== 2022–23 UEFA Nations League fixtures and results =====
| 23 September 2022 2022–23 UEFA Nations League A | Germany | 0–1 | Hungary | Leipzig |
| 20:45 (20:45 UTC+2) | | Report | Szalai 17' | Stadium: Red Bull Arena; Attendance: 39,513; Referee: Slavko Vinčić (Slovenia) |

| 26 September 2022 2022–23 UEFA Nations League A | England | 3–3 | Germany | London |
| 20:45 (19:45 UTC+1) | Shaw 71'; Mount 75'; Kane 83' (pen.) | Report | Gündoğan 52' (pen.); Havertz 67', 87' | Stadium: Wembley Stadium; Attendance: 78,949; Referee: Danny Makkelie (Netherlands) |

==== 2022 FIFA World Cup ====
===== 2022 FIFA World Cup Group E =====
| Pos | Team | Pld | W | D | L | GF | GA | GD | Pts | Qualification |
|---|---|---|---|---|---|---|---|---|---|---|
| 1 | Japan | 3 | 2 | 0 | 1 | 4 | 3 | +1 | 6 | Advanced to knockout stage |
| 2 | Spain | 3 | 1 | 1 | 1 | 9 | 3 | +6 | 4 | Advanced to knockout stage |
| 3 | Germany | 3 | 1 | 1 | 1 | 6 | 5 | +1 | 4 | |
| 4 | Costa Rica | 3 | 1 | 0 | 2 | 3 | 11 | −8 | 3 | |

Source: FIFA
Rules for classification: Group stage tiebreakers

===== 2022 FIFA World Cup fixtures and results =====
| 23 November 2022 Group E | Germany | 1–2 | Japan | Al Rayyan, Qatar |
| 14:00 (16:00 UTC+3) | Gündoğan 33' (pen.) | Report | Dōan 75'; Asano 83' | Stadium: Khalifa International Stadium; Attendance: 42,608; Referee: Iván Barton (El Salvador) |

| 27 November 2022 Group E | Spain | 1–1 | Germany | Al Khor, Qatar |
| 20:00 (22:00 UTC+3) | Morata 62' | Report | Füllkrug 83' | Stadium: Al Bayt Stadium; Attendance: 68,895; Referee: Danny Makkelie (Netherlands) |

| 1 December 2022 Group E | Costa Rica | 2–4 | Germany | Al Khor, Qatar |
| 20:00 (22:00 UTC+3) | Tejeda 58'; Neuer 70' (o.g.) | Report | Gnabry 10'; Havertz 73', 85'; Füllkrug 89' | Stadium: Al Bayt Stadium; Attendance: 67,054; Referee: Stéphanie Frappart (France) |

==== Friendly matches ====
| 16 November 2022 Friendly | Oman | 0–1 | Germany | Muscat |
| 18:00 (21:00 UTC+4) | | Report | Füllkrug 80' | Stadium: Sultan Qaboos Sports Complex; Attendance: 25,654; Referee: Mohammed Al-Hoish (Saudi Arabia) |

| 25 March 2023 Friendly | Germany | 2–0 | Peru | Mainz |
| 20:45 (20:45 UTC+2) | Füllkrug 12', 33' | Report | | Stadium: Mewa Arena; Attendance: 25,358; Referee: Maria Sole Ferrieri Caputi (Italy) |

| 28 March 2023 Friendly | Germany | 2–3 | Belgium | Cologne |
| 20:45 (20:45 UTC+2) | Füllkrug 44' (pen.); Gnabry 87' | Report | Carrasco 6'; Lukaku 9'; De Bruyne 78' | Stadium: RheinEnergieStadion; Attendance: 42,910; Referee: Willy Delajod (France) |

| 12 June 2023 Friendly | Germany | 3–3 | Ukraine | Bremen |
| 18:00 (18:00 UTC+2) | Füllkrug 6'; Havertz 83'; Kimmich 90+1' (pen.) | Report | Tsyhankov 19', 56'; Rüdiger 23' (o.g.) | Stadium: Weserstadion; Attendance: 35,795; Referee: Anastasios Sidiropoulos (Greece) |

| 16 June 2023 Friendly | Poland | 1–0 | Germany | Warsaw |
| 20:45 (20:45 UTC+2) | Kiwior 31' | Report | | Stadium: Stadion Narodowy; Attendance: 57,098; Referee: Orel Grinfeld (Israel) |

| 20 June 2023 Friendly | Germany | 0–2 | Colombia | Gelsenkirchen |
| 20:45 (20:45 UTC+2) | | Report | Díaz 54'; Cuadrado 82' (pen.) | Stadium: Arena AufSchalke; Attendance: 50,421; Referee: Halil Umut Meler (Turkey) |

=== Germany women's national football team ===
==== Kits ====
| Old home | New home | Away |

==== UEFA Women's Euro 2022 ====
===== UEFA Women's Euro 2022 Group B =====
| Pos | Team | Pld | W | D | L | GF | GA | GD | Pts | Qualification |
|---|---|---|---|---|---|---|---|---|---|---|
| 1 | Germany | 3 | 3 | 0 | 0 | 9 | 0 | +9 | 9 | Advance to knockout stage |
| 2 | Spain | 3 | 2 | 0 | 1 | 5 | 3 | +2 | 6 | Advance to knockout stage |
| 3 | Denmark | 3 | 1 | 0 | 2 | 1 | 5 | −4 | 3 | |
| 4 | Finland | 3 | 0 | 0 | 3 | 1 | 8 | −7 | 0 | |

Source: UEFA
Rules for classification: Group stage tiebreakers

===== UEFA Women's Euro 2022 fixtures and results =====
| 8 July 2022 Group B | Germany | 4–0 | Denmark | London, England |
| 21:00 (20:00 UTC+1) | Magull 21'; Schüller 57'; Lattwein 78'; Popp 86' | Report | | Stadium: Brentford Community Stadium; Attendance: 15,736; Referee: Esther Staubli (Switzerland) |

| 12 July 2022 Group B | Germany | 2–0 | Spain | London, England |
| 21:00 (20:00 UTC+1) | Bühl 3'; Popp 37' | Report | | Stadium: Brentford Community Stadium; Attendance: 16,037; Referee: Stéphanie Frappart (France) |

| 16 July 2022 Group B | Finland | 0–3 | Germany | Milton Keynes, England |
| 21:00 (20:00 UTC+1) | | Report | Kleinherne 40'; Popp 48'; Anyomi 63' | Stadium: Stadium MK; Attendance: 20,721; Referee: Emikar Calderas Barrera (Venezuela) |

| 21 July 2022 Quarter-final | Germany | 2–0 | Austria | London, England |
| 21:00 (20:00 UTC+1) | Magull 25'; Popp 90' | Report | | Stadium: Brentford Community Stadium; Attendance: 16,025; Referee: Rebecca Welch (England) |

| 27 July 2022 Semi-final | Germany | 2–1 | France | Milton Keynes, England |
| 21:00 (20:00 UTC+1) | Popp 40', 76' | Report | Frohms 44' (o.g.) | Stadium: Stadium MK; Attendance: 27,445; Referee: Cheryl Foster (Wales) |

| 31 July 2022 Final | England | 2–1 (a.e.t.) | Germany | London |
| 18:00 (17:00 UTC+1) | Toone 62'; Kelly 111' | Report | Magull 79' | Stadium: Wembley Stadium; Attendance: 87,192; Referee: Kateryna Monzul (Ukraine) |

==== 2023 FIFA Women's World Cup qualification ====
===== 2023 FIFA Women's World Cup qualification Group H =====
| Pos | Team | Pld | W | D | L | GF | GA | GD | Pts | Qualification | (Germany) | (Portugal) | (Serbia) | (Turkey) | (Israel) | (Bulgaria) |
|---|---|---|---|---|---|---|---|---|---|---|---|---|---|---|---|---|
| 1 | Germany | 10 | 9 | 0 | 1 | 47 | 5 | +42 | 27 | 2023 FIFA Women's World Cup | — | 3–0 | 5–1 | 8–0 | 7–0 | 7–0 |
| 2 | Portugal | 10 | 7 | 1 | 2 | 26 | 9 | +17 | 22 | Play-offs | 1–3 | — | 2–1 | 4–0 | 4–0 | 3–0 |
| 3 | Serbia | 10 | 7 | 0 | 3 | 26 | 14 | +12 | 21 | | 3–2 | 1–2 | — | 2–0 | 4–0 | 3–0 |
| 4 | Turkey | 10 | 3 | 1 | 6 | 9 | 26 | −17 | 10 | | 0–3 | 1–1 | 2–5 | — | 3–2 | 1–0 |
| 5 | Israel | 10 | 3 | 0 | 7 | 7 | 25 | −18 | 9 | | 0–1 | 0–4 | 0–2 | 1–0 | — | 2–0 |
| 6 | Bulgaria | 10 | 0 | 0 | 10 | 1 | 37 | −36 | 0 | | 0–8 | 0–5 | 1–4 | 0–2 | 0–2 | — |

Source: UEFA
Rules for classification: Tiebreakers

===== 2023 FIFA Women's World Cup qualification fixtures and results =====
| 3 September 2022 2023 Women's World Cup qualification | Turkey | 0–3 | Germany | Bursa |
| 14:45 (15:45 UTC+3) | | Report | Rauch 57' (pen.); Bühl 59'; Schüller 77' | Stadium: Timsah Park; Attendance: 2,000; Referee: Maria Marotta (Italy) |

| 6 September 2022 2023 Women's World Cup qualification | Bulgaria | 0–8 | Germany | Plovdiv |
| 18:30 (19:30 UTC+3) | | Report | Schüller 35', 45+1', 52'; Freigang 45', 64', 87'; Lohmann 54'; Huth 81' (pen.) | Stadium: Stadion Lokomotiv; Attendance: 200; Referee: Elvira Nurmustafina (Kazakhstan) |

==== Friendly matches ====
| 7 October 2022 Friendly | Germany | 2–1 | France | Dresden |
| 20:30 (20:30 UTC+2) | Popp 45', 48' | Report | Asseyi 84' (pen.) | Stadium: Rudolf-Harbig-Stadion; Attendance: 26,538; Referee: Tess Olofsson (Sweden) |

| 11 November 2022 Friendly | United States | 1–2 | Germany | Fort Lauderdale |
| 01:00 (10 November 19:00 UTC−5) | Rapinoe 86' | Report | Murphy 52' (o.g.); Krumbiegel 90' | Stadium: DRV PNK Stadium; Attendance: 16,500; Referee: Odette Hamilton (Jamaica) |

| 13 November 2022 Friendly | United States | 2–1 | Germany | Harrison |
| 23:00 (17:00 UTC−5) | Smith 54'; Pugh 56' | Report | Brand 18' | Stadium: Red Bull Arena; Attendance: 26,317; Referee: Marianela Araya Cruz (Costa Rica) |

| 21 February 2023 Friendly | Germany | 0–0 | Sweden | Duisburg |
| 18:15 (18:15 UTC+1) | | Report | | Stadium: MSV-Arena; Attendance: 20,169; Referee: Shona Shukrula (Netherlands) |

| 7 April 2023 Friendly | Netherlands | 0–1 | Germany | Sittard |
| 20:00 (20:00 UTC+2) | | Report | Lohmann 53' | Stadium: Fortuna Sittard Stadion; Attendance: 10,789; Referee: Olatz Rivera Olmedo (Spain) |

| 11 April 2023 Friendly | Germany | 1–2 | Brazil | Nuremberg |
| 18:00 (18:00 UTC+2) | Brand 90+2' | Report | Tamires 11'; Borges 39' | Stadium: Max-Morlock-Stadion; Attendance: 32,587; Referee: Esther Staubli (Switzerland) |

| 24 June 2023 Friendly | Germany | 2–1 | Vietnam | Offenbach am Main |
| 18:15 (18:15 UTC+2) | Krumbiegel 3'; Minge 80' | Report | Nguyễn Thị Thanh Nhã 90+3' | Stadium: Sparda-Bank-Hessen-Stadion; Attendance: 13,652; Referee: Rebecca Welch (England) |

== League season ==
=== Men ===
==== Bundesliga ====
===== Bundesliga standings =====
| Pos | Team | Pld | W | D | L | GF | GA | GD | Pts | Qualification or relegation |
|---|---|---|---|---|---|---|---|---|---|---|
| 1 | Bayern Munich (C) | 34 | 21 | 8 | 5 | 92 | 38 | +54 | 71 | Qualification for the Champions League group stage |
| 2 | Borussia Dortmund | 34 | 22 | 5 | 7 | 83 | 44 | +39 | 71 | Qualification for the Champions League group stage |
| 3 | RB Leipzig | 34 | 20 | 6 | 8 | 64 | 41 | +23 | 66 | Qualification for the Champions League group stage |
| 4 | Union Berlin | 34 | 18 | 8 | 8 | 51 | 38 | +13 | 62 | Qualification for the Champions League group stage |
| 5 | SC Freiburg | 34 | 17 | 8 | 9 | 51 | 44 | +7 | 59 | Qualification for the Europa League group stage (Note: Since the 2022–23 DFB-Pokal winners, RB Leipzig, qualified for the Champions League based on league position, the Europa League group stage spot was passed to the sixth-placed team, and the Europa Conference League play-off round spot was passed to the seventh-placed team.) |
| 6 | Bayer Leverkusen | 34 | 14 | 8 | 12 | 57 | 49 | +8 | 50 | Qualification for the Europa League group stage |
| 7 | Eintracht Frankfurt | 34 | 13 | 11 | 10 | 58 | 52 | +6 | 50 | Qualification for the Europa Conference League play-off round |
| 8 | VfL Wolfsburg | 34 | 13 | 10 | 11 | 57 | 48 | +9 | 49 | |
| 9 | Mainz 05 | 34 | 12 | 10 | 12 | 54 | 55 | −1 | 46 | |
| 10 | Borussia Mönchengladbach | 34 | 11 | 10 | 13 | 52 | 55 | −3 | 43 | |
| 11 | 1. FC Köln | 34 | 10 | 12 | 12 | 49 | 54 | −5 | 42 | |
| 12 | 1899 Hoffenheim | 34 | 10 | 6 | 18 | 48 | 57 | −9 | 36 | |
| 13 | Werder Bremen | 34 | 10 | 6 | 18 | 51 | 64 | −13 | 36 | |
| 14 | VfL Bochum | 34 | 10 | 5 | 19 | 40 | 72 | −32 | 35 | |
| 15 | FC Augsburg | 34 | 9 | 7 | 18 | 42 | 63 | −21 | 34 | |
| 16 | VfB Stuttgart (O) | 34 | 7 | 12 | 15 | 45 | 57 | −12 | 33 | Qualification for the relegation play-offs |
| 17 | Schalke 04 (R) | 34 | 7 | 10 | 17 | 35 | 71 | −36 | 31 | Relegation to 2. Bundesliga |
| 18 | Hertha BSC (R) | 34 | 7 | 8 | 19 | 42 | 69 | −27 | 29 | Relegation to 2. Bundesliga |

Source: DFB
Rules for classification: 1) Points; 2) Goal difference; 3) Goals scored; 4) Head-to-head results; 5) Head-to-head away goals scored; 6) Away goals scored; 7) Play-off.
(C) Champions; (O) Play-off winners; (R) Relegated

==== 2. Bundesliga ====
===== 2. Bundesliga standings =====
| Pos | Team | Pld | W | D | L | GF | GA | GD | Pts | Promotion, qualification or relegation |
|---|---|---|---|---|---|---|---|---|---|---|
| 1 | 1. FC Heidenheim (C, P) | 34 | 19 | 10 | 5 | 67 | 36 | +31 | 67 | Promotion to Bundesliga |
| 2 | Darmstadt 98 (P) | 34 | 20 | 7 | 7 | 50 | 33 | +17 | 67 | Promotion to Bundesliga |
| 3 | Hamburger SV | 34 | 20 | 6 | 8 | 70 | 45 | +25 | 66 | Qualification for promotion play-offs |
| 4 | Fortuna Düsseldorf | 34 | 17 | 7 | 10 | 60 | 43 | +17 | 58 | |
| 5 | FC St. Pauli | 34 | 16 | 10 | 8 | 55 | 39 | +16 | 58 | |
| 6 | SC Paderborn | 34 | 16 | 7 | 11 | 68 | 44 | +24 | 55 | |
| 7 | Karlsruher SC | 34 | 13 | 7 | 14 | 56 | 53 | +3 | 46 | |
| 8 | Holstein Kiel | 34 | 12 | 10 | 12 | 58 | 61 | −3 | 46 | |
| 9 | 1. FC Kaiserslautern | 34 | 11 | 12 | 11 | 47 | 48 | −1 | 45 | |
| 10 | Hannover 96 | 34 | 12 | 8 | 14 | 50 | 55 | −5 | 44 | |
| 11 | 1. FC Magdeburg | 34 | 12 | 7 | 15 | 48 | 55 | −7 | 43 | |
| 12 | Greuther Fürth | 34 | 10 | 11 | 13 | 47 | 50 | −3 | 41 | |
| 13 | Hansa Rostock | 34 | 12 | 5 | 17 | 32 | 48 | −16 | 41 | |
| 14 | 1. FC Nürnberg | 34 | 10 | 9 | 15 | 32 | 49 | −17 | 39 | |
| 15 | Eintracht Braunschweig | 34 | 9 | 9 | 16 | 42 | 59 | −17 | 36 | |
| 16 | Arminia Bielefeld (R) | 34 | 9 | 7 | 18 | 50 | 62 | −12 | 34 | Qualification for relegation play-offs |
| 17 | Jahn Regensburg (R) | 34 | 8 | 7 | 19 | 34 | 58 | −24 | 31 | Relegation to 3. Liga |
| 18 | SV Sandhausen (R) | 34 | 7 | 7 | 20 | 35 | 63 | −28 | 28 | Relegation to 3. Liga |

Source: DFB
Rules for classification: 1) Points; 2) Goal difference; 3) Goals scored; 4) Head-to-head results; 5) Head-to-head away goals scored; 6) Away goals scored; 7) Play-off.
(C) Champions; (P) Promoted; (R) Relegated

==== 3. Liga ====
===== 3. Liga standings =====
| Pos | Team | Pld | W | D | L | GF | GA | GD | Pts | Promotion, qualification or relegation |
|---|---|---|---|---|---|---|---|---|---|---|
| 1 | SV Elversberg (C, P) | 38 | 22 | 8 | 8 | 80 | 40 | +40 | 74 | Promotion to 2. Bundesliga and qualification for DFB-Pokal |
| 2 | SC Freiburg II (Note: Reserve teams are ineligible for promotion or DFB-Pokal qualification.) | 38 | 21 | 10 | 7 | 54 | 34 | +20 | 73 | |
| 3 | VfL Osnabrück (P) | 38 | 21 | 7 | 10 | 70 | 49 | +21 | 70 | Promotion to 2. Bundesliga and qualification for DFB-Pokal |
| 4 | Wehen Wiesbaden (O, P) | 38 | 21 | 7 | 10 | 71 | 51 | +20 | 70 | Qualification for promotion play-offs and DFB-Pokal |
| 5 | 1. FC Saarbrücken | 38 | 20 | 9 | 9 | 64 | 39 | +25 | 69 | Qualification for DFB-Pokal |
| 6 | Dynamo Dresden | 38 | 20 | 9 | 9 | 65 | 44 | +21 | 69 | |
| 7 | Waldhof Mannheim | 38 | 19 | 3 | 16 | 63 | 65 | −2 | 60 | |
| 8 | 1860 Munich | 38 | 16 | 9 | 13 | 61 | 52 | +9 | 57 | |
| 9 | Viktoria Köln | 38 | 14 | 13 | 11 | 58 | 53 | +5 | 55 | |
| 10 | SC Verl | 38 | 13 | 10 | 15 | 60 | 58 | +2 | 49 | |
| 11 | FC Ingolstadt | 38 | 14 | 5 | 19 | 54 | 56 | −2 | 47 | |
| 12 | MSV Duisburg | 38 | 11 | 13 | 14 | 54 | 58 | −4 | 46 | |
| 13 | Borussia Dortmund II | 38 | 13 | 6 | 19 | 47 | 49 | −2 | 45 | |
| 14 | Erzgebirge Aue | 38 | 12 | 9 | 17 | 49 | 62 | −13 | 45 | |
| 15 | Rot-Weiss Essen | 38 | 9 | 15 | 14 | 43 | 56 | −13 | 42 | |
| 16 | Hallescher FC | 38 | 10 | 11 | 17 | 49 | 60 | −11 | 41 | |
| 17 | SV Meppen (R) | 38 | 8 | 13 | 17 | 43 | 65 | −22 | 37 | Relegation to Regionalliga |
| 18 | VfB Oldenburg (R) | 38 | 9 | 8 | 21 | 42 | 64 | −22 | 35 | Relegation to Regionalliga |
| 19 | FSV Zwickau (R) | 38 | 9 | 8 | 21 | 42 | 72 | −30 | 35 | Relegation to Regionalliga |
| 20 | SpVgg Bayreuth (R) | 38 | 9 | 5 | 24 | 39 | 81 | −42 | 32 | Relegation to Regionalliga |

Source: DFB
Rules for classification: 1) Points; 2) Goal difference; 3) Goals scored; 4) Head-to-head results; 5) Head-to-head away goals scored; 6) Away goals scored; 7) Play-off.
(C) Champions; (O) Play-off winners; (P) Promoted; (R) Relegated

=== Women ===
==== Frauen-Bundesliga ====
===== Frauen-Bundesliga standings =====
| Pos | Team | Pld | W | D | L | GF | GA | GD | Pts | Qualification or relegation |
|---|---|---|---|---|---|---|---|---|---|---|
| 1 | Bayern Munich (C) | 22 | 19 | 2 | 1 | 67 | 8 | +59 | 59 | Qualification for Champions League group stage |
| 2 | VfL Wolfsburg | 22 | 19 | 0 | 3 | 75 | 17 | +58 | 57 | Qualification for Champions League second round |
| 3 | Eintracht Frankfurt | 22 | 17 | 3 | 2 | 57 | 22 | +35 | 54 | Qualification for Champions League first round |
| 4 | 1899 Hoffenheim | 22 | 15 | 3 | 4 | 55 | 25 | +30 | 48 | |
| 5 | Bayer Leverkusen | 22 | 9 | 3 | 10 | 31 | 28 | +3 | 30 | |
| 6 | SC Freiburg | 22 | 7 | 3 | 12 | 36 | 47 | −11 | 24 | |
| 7 | SGS Essen | 22 | 6 | 5 | 11 | 26 | 42 | −16 | 23 | |
| 8 | Werder Bremen | 22 | 5 | 6 | 11 | 16 | 39 | −23 | 21 | |
| 9 | 1. FC Köln | 22 | 5 | 4 | 13 | 20 | 44 | −24 | 19 | |
| 10 | MSV Duisburg | 22 | 5 | 3 | 14 | 15 | 47 | −32 | 18 | |
| 11 | SV Meppen (R) | 22 | 5 | 2 | 15 | 16 | 40 | −24 | 17 | Relegation to 2. Bundesliga |
| 12 | Turbine Potsdam (R) | 22 | 2 | 2 | 18 | 13 | 68 | −55 | 8 | Relegation to 2. Bundesliga |

Source: DFB
Rules for classification: 1) Points; 2) Goal difference; 3) Goals scored; 4) Head-to-head points; 5) Head-to-head goal difference; 6) Head-to-head goals scored; 7) Head-to-head away goals scored; 8) Away goals scored; 9) Play-off.
(C) Champions; (R) Relegated

==== 2. Frauen-Bundesliga ====
===== 2. Frauen-Bundesliga standings =====
| Pos | Team | Pld | W | D | L | GF | GA | GD | Pts | Promotion or relegation |
|---|---|---|---|---|---|---|---|---|---|---|
| 1 | RB Leipzig (C, P) | 26 | 21 | 1 | 4 | 84 | 23 | +61 | 64 | Promotion to Bundesliga |
| 2 | 1. FC Nürnberg (P) | 26 | 17 | 1 | 8 | 54 | 31 | +23 | 52 | Promotion to Bundesliga |
| 3 | FSV Gütersloh | 26 | 16 | 3 | 7 | 49 | 29 | +20 | 51 | |
| 4 | Bayern Munich II (Note: Reserve teams cannot compete in the Frauen-Bundesliga and are therefore ineligible for promotion.) | 26 | 13 | 4 | 9 | 35 | 28 | +7 | 43 | |
| 5 | SG Andernach | 26 | 11 | 9 | 6 | 62 | 39 | +23 | 42 | |
| 6 | VfL Wolfsburg II | 26 | 10 | 7 | 9 | 32 | 41 | −9 | 37 | |
| 7 | SC Sand | 26 | 9 | 8 | 9 | 24 | 25 | −1 | 35 | |
| 8 | Carl Zeiss Jena | 26 | 10 | 4 | 12 | 43 | 44 | −1 | 34 | |
| 9 | Eintracht Frankfurt II | 26 | 10 | 4 | 12 | 38 | 43 | −5 | 34 | |
| 10 | 1899 Hoffenheim II | 26 | 9 | 6 | 11 | 37 | 49 | −12 | 33 | |
| 11 | FC Ingolstadt | 26 | 9 | 4 | 13 | 27 | 43 | −16 | 31 | |
| 12 | SC Freiburg II (R) | 26 | 8 | 4 | 14 | 39 | 43 | −4 | 28 | Relegation to Regionalliga |
| 13 | 1. FC Köln II (R) | 26 | 4 | 6 | 16 | 28 | 68 | −40 | 18 | Relegation to Regionalliga |
| 14 | Turbine Potsdam II (R) | 26 | 3 | 3 | 20 | 28 | 74 | −46 | 12 | Relegation to Regionalliga |

Source: DFB
Rules for classification: 1) Points; 2) Goal difference; 3) Goals scored; 4) Head-to-head results; 5) Head-to-head away goals scored; 6) Away goals scored; 7) Play-off.
(C) Champions; (P) Promoted; (R) Relegated

== Cup competitions ==
=== Men ===
==== DFB-Pokal ====
===== Final =====
3 June 2023
20:00 CEST

| RB Leipzig | 2–0 | Eintracht Frankfurt |
|---|---|---|
| Nkunku 71'; Szoboszlai 85' | Report |

Olympiastadion, Berlin
Attendance: 74,322
Referee: Daniel Siebert (Berlin)

==== DFL-Supercup ====
30 July 2022
20:30 CEST

| RB Leipzig | 3–5 | Bayern Munich |
|---|---|---|
| Halstenberg 59'; Nkunku 77' (pen.); Olmo 89' | Report | Musiala 14'; Mané 31'; Pavard 45'; Gnabry 66'; Sané 90+8' |

Red Bull Arena, Leipzig
Attendance: 47,069
Referee: Robert Schröder (Hanover)

=== Women ===
==== DFB-Pokal Frauen ====
18 May 2023
16:45

| VfL Wolfsburg | 4–1 | SC Freiburg |
|---|---|---|
| Karl 4' (o.g.); Blomqvist 58'; Popp 84'; Janssen 90' (pen.) | Report | Minge 42' |

RheinEnergieStadion, Cologne
Attendance: 44,808
Referee: Fabienne Michel

== German clubs in Europe ==
=== UEFA Super Cup ===
10 August 2022
22:00 UTC+3

| Real Madrid (Spain) | 2–0 | (Germany) Eintracht Frankfurt |
|---|---|---|
| Alaba 37'; Benzema 65' | Report |

Olympic Stadium, Helsinki
Attendance: 31,042
Referee: Michael Oliver (England)

=== UEFA Champions League ===
==== Group stage ====
===== Group B =====
| Pos | Team | Pld | W | D | L | GF | GA | GD | Pts | Qualification | POR | BRU | LEV | ATM |
|---|---|---|---|---|---|---|---|---|---|---|---|---|---|---|
| 1 | (Portugal) Porto | 6 | 4 | 0 | 2 | 12 | 7 | +5 | 12 | Advance to knockout phase | — | 0–4 | 2–0 | 2–1 |
| 2 | (Belgium) Club Brugge | 6 | 3 | 2 | 1 | 7 | 4 | +3 | 11 | Advance to knockout phase | 0–4 | — | 1–0 | 2–0 |
| 3 | (Germany) Bayer Leverkusen | 6 | 1 | 2 | 3 | 4 | 8 | −4 | 5 (Note: Head-to-head points: Bayer Leverkusen 4, Atlético Madrid 1.) | Transfer to Europa League | 0–3 | 0–0 | — | 2–0 |
| 4 | (Spain) Atlético Madrid | 6 | 1 | 2 | 3 | 5 | 9 | −4 | 5 | | 2–1 | 0–0 | 2–2 | — |

Source: UEFA

===== Group C =====
| Pos | Team | Pld | W | D | L | GF | GA | GD | Pts | Qualification | BAY | INT | BAR | PLZ |
|---|---|---|---|---|---|---|---|---|---|---|---|---|---|---|
| 1 | (Germany) Bayern Munich | 6 | 6 | 0 | 0 | 18 | 2 | +16 | 18 | Advance to knockout phase | — | 2–0 | 2–0 | 5–0 |
| 2 | (Italy) Inter Milan | 6 | 3 | 1 | 2 | 10 | 7 | +3 | 10 | Advance to knockout phase | 0–2 | — | 1–0 | 4–0 |
| 3 | (Spain) Barcelona | 6 | 2 | 1 | 3 | 12 | 12 | 0 | 7 | Transfer to Europa League | 0–3 | 3–3 | — | 5–1 |
| 4 | (Czech Republic) Viktoria Plzeň | 6 | 0 | 0 | 6 | 5 | 24 | −19 | 0 | | 2–4 | 0–2 | 2–4 | — |

Source: UEFA

===== Group D =====
| Pos | Team | Pld | W | D | L | GF | GA | GD | Pts | Qualification | TOT | FRA | SPO | MAR |
|---|---|---|---|---|---|---|---|---|---|---|---|---|---|---|
| 1 | (England) Tottenham Hotspur | 6 | 3 | 2 | 1 | 8 | 6 | +2 | 11 | Advance to knockout phase | — | 3–2 | 1–1 | 2–0 |
| 2 | (Germany) Eintracht Frankfurt | 6 | 3 | 1 | 2 | 7 | 8 | −1 | 10 | Advance to knockout phase | 0–0 | — | 0–3 | 2–1 |
| 3 | (Portugal) Sporting CP | 6 | 2 | 1 | 3 | 8 | 9 | −1 | 7 | Transfer to Europa League | 2–0 | 1–2 | — | 0–2 |
| 4 | (France) Marseille | 6 | 2 | 0 | 4 | 8 | 8 | 0 | 6 | | 1–2 | 0–1 | 4–1 | — |

Source: UEFA

===== Group F =====
| Pos | Team | Pld | W | D | L | GF | GA | GD | Pts | Qualification | RMA | RBL | SHK | CEL |
|---|---|---|---|---|---|---|---|---|---|---|---|---|---|---|
| 1 | (Spain) Real Madrid | 6 | 4 | 1 | 1 | 15 | 6 | +9 | 13 | Advance to knockout phase | — | 2–0 | 2–1 | 5–1 |
| 2 | (Germany) RB Leipzig | 6 | 4 | 0 | 2 | 13 | 9 | +4 | 12 | Advance to knockout phase | 3–2 | — | 1–4 | 3–1 |
| 3 | (Ukraine) Shakhtar Donetsk | 6 | 1 | 3 | 2 | 8 | 10 | −2 | 6 | Transfer to Europa League | 1–1 | 0–4 | — | 1–1 |
| 4 | (Scotland) Celtic | 6 | 0 | 2 | 4 | 4 | 15 | −11 | 2 | | 0–3 | 0–2 | 1–1 | — |

Source: UEFA

===== Group G =====
| Pos | Team | Pld | W | D | L | GF | GA | GD | Pts | Qualification | MCI | DOR | SEV | CPH |
|---|---|---|---|---|---|---|---|---|---|---|---|---|---|---|
| 1 | (England) Manchester City | 6 | 4 | 2 | 0 | 14 | 2 | +12 | 14 | Advance to knockout phase | — | 2–1 | 3–1 | 5–0 |
| 2 | (Germany) Borussia Dortmund | 6 | 2 | 3 | 1 | 10 | 5 | +5 | 9 | Advance to knockout phase | 0–0 | — | 1–1 | 3–0 |
| 3 | (Spain) Sevilla | 6 | 1 | 2 | 3 | 6 | 12 | −6 | 5 | Transfer to Europa League | 0–4 | 1–4 | — | 3–0 |
| 4 | (Denmark) Copenhagen | 6 | 0 | 3 | 3 | 1 | 12 | −11 | 3 | | 0–0 | 1–1 | 0–0 | — |

Source: UEFA

==== Knockout phase ====
===== Round of 16 =====
| Team 1 | Agg. | Team 2 | 1st leg | 2nd leg |
|---|---|---|---|---|
| RB Leipzig (Germany) | 1–8 | (England) Manchester City | 1–1 | 0–7 |
| Eintracht Frankfurt (Germany) | 0–5 | (Italy) Napoli | 0–2 | 0–3 |
| Borussia Dortmund (Germany) | 1–2 | (England) Chelsea | 1–0 | 0–2 |
| Paris Saint-Germain (France) | 0–3 | (Germany) Bayern Munich | 0–1 | 0–2 |

===== Quarter-finals =====
| Team 1 | Agg. | Team 2 | 1st leg | 2nd leg |
|---|---|---|---|---|
| Manchester City (England) | 4–1 | (Germany) Bayern Munich | 3–0 | 1–1 |

=== UEFA Europa League ===
==== Group stage ====
===== Group D =====
| Pos | Team | Pld | W | D | L | GF | GA | GD | Pts | Qualification | USG | UBE | BRA | MAL |
|---|---|---|---|---|---|---|---|---|---|---|---|---|---|---|
| 1 | (Belgium) Union Saint-Gilloise | 6 | 4 | 1 | 1 | 11 | 7 | +4 | 13 | Advance to round of 16 | — | 0–1 | 3–3 | 3–2 |
| 2 | (Germany) Union Berlin | 6 | 4 | 0 | 2 | 4 | 2 | +2 | 12 | Advance to knockout round play-offs | 0–1 | — | 1–0 | 1–0 |
| 3 | (Portugal) Braga | 6 | 3 | 1 | 2 | 9 | 7 | +2 | 10 | Transfer to Europa Conference League | 1–2 | 1–0 | — | 2–1 |
| 4 | (Sweden) Malmö FF | 6 | 0 | 0 | 6 | 3 | 11 | −8 | 0 | | 0–2 | 0–1 | 0–2 | — |

Source: UEFA

===== Group G =====
| Pos | Team | Pld | W | D | L | GF | GA | GD | Pts | Qualification | FRE | NAN | QRB | OLY |
|---|---|---|---|---|---|---|---|---|---|---|---|---|---|---|
| 1 | (Germany) SC Freiburg | 6 | 4 | 2 | 0 | 13 | 3 | +10 | 14 | Advance to round of 16 | — | 2–0 | 2–1 | 1–1 |
| 2 | (France) Nantes | 6 | 3 | 0 | 3 | 6 | 11 | −5 | 9 | Advance to knockout round play-offs | 0–4 | — | 2–1 | 2–1 |
| 3 | (Azerbaijan) Qarabağ | 6 | 2 | 2 | 2 | 9 | 5 | +4 | 8 | Transfer to Europa Conference League | 1–1 | 3–0 | — | 0–0 |
| 4 | (Greece) Olympiacos | 6 | 0 | 2 | 4 | 2 | 11 | −9 | 2 | | 0–3 | 0–2 | 0–3 | — |

Source: UEFA

==== Knockout stage ====
===== Knockout round play-offs =====
| Team 1 | Agg. | Team 2 | 1st leg | 2nd leg |
|---|---|---|---|---|
| Ajax (Netherlands) | 1–3 | (Germany) Union Berlin | 0–0 | 1–3 |
| Bayer Leverkusen (Germany) | 5–5 (5–3 p) | (France) Monaco | 2–3 | 3–2 (a.e.t.) |

===== Round of 16 =====
| Team 1 | Agg. | Team 2 | 1st leg | 2nd leg |
|---|---|---|---|---|
| Union Berlin (Germany) | 3–6 | (Belgium) Union Saint-Gilloise | 3–3 | 0–3 |
| Juventus (Italy) | 3–0 | (Germany) SC Freiburg | 1–0 | 2–0 |
| Bayer Leverkusen (Germany) | 4–0 | (Hungary) Ferencváros | 2–0 | 2–0 |

===== Quarter-finals =====
| Team 1 | Agg. | Team 2 | 1st leg | 2nd leg |
|---|---|---|---|---|
| Bayer Leverkusen (Germany) | 5–2 | (Belgium) Union Saint-Gilloise | 1–1 | 4–1 |

===== Semi-finals =====
| Team 1 | Agg. | Team 2 | 1st leg | 2nd leg |
|---|---|---|---|---|
| Roma (Italy) | 1–0 | (Germany) Bayer Leverkusen | 1–0 | 0–0 |

=== UEFA Europa Conference League ===
==== Qualifying phase and play-off round ====
===== Play-off round =====
| Team 1 | Agg. | Team 2 | 1st leg | 2nd leg |
|---|---|---|---|---|
| 1. FC Köln (Germany) | 4–2 | (Hungary) Fehérvár | 1–2 | 3–0 |

==== Group stage ====
===== Group D =====
| Pos | Team | Pld | W | D | L | GF | GA | GD | Pts | Qualification | NCE | PRT | KLN | SVK |
|---|---|---|---|---|---|---|---|---|---|---|---|---|---|---|
| 1 | (France) Nice | 6 | 2 | 3 | 1 | 8 | 7 | +1 | 9 (Note: Head-to-head points: Nice 4, Partizan 1.) | Advance to round of 16 | — | 2–1 | 1–1 | 1–2 |
| 2 | (Serbia) Partizan | 6 | 2 | 3 | 1 | 9 | 7 | +2 | 9 | Advance to knockout round play-offs | 1–1 | — | 2–0 | 1–1 |
| 3 | (Germany) 1. FC Köln | 6 | 2 | 2 | 2 | 8 | 8 | 0 | 8 | | 2–2 | 0–1 | — | 4–2 |
| 4 | (Czech Republic) Slovácko | 6 | 1 | 2 | 3 | 8 | 11 | −3 | 5 | | 0–1 | 3–3 | 0–1 | — |

Source: UEFA

=== UEFA Women's Champions League ===
==== Qualifying rounds ====
===== Round 1 =====
====== Semi-finals ======
| Team 1 | Score | Team 2 |
|---|---|---|
| Fortuna Hjørring (Denmark) | 0–2 | (Germany) Eintracht Frankfurt |

====== Final ======
| Team 1 | Score | Team 2 |
|---|---|---|
| Ajax (Netherlands) | 2–1 | (Germany) Eintracht Frankfurt |

===== Round 2 =====
| Team 1 | Agg. | Team 2 | 1st leg | 2nd leg |
|---|---|---|---|---|
| Real Sociedad (Spain) | 1–4 | (Germany) Bayern Munich | 0–1 | 1–3 |

==== Group stage ====
===== Group B =====
| Pos | Team | Pld | W | D | L | GF | GA | GD | Pts | Qualification | WOL | ROM | PÖL | PRA |
|---|---|---|---|---|---|---|---|---|---|---|---|---|---|---|
| 1 | (Germany) VfL Wolfsburg | 6 | 4 | 2 | 0 | 19 | 5 | +14 | 14 | Advance to Quarter-finals | — | 4–2 | 4–0 | 0–0 |
| 2 | (Italy) Roma | 6 | 4 | 1 | 1 | 16 | 8 | +8 | 13 | Advance to Quarter-finals | 1–1 | — | 5–0 | 1–0 |
| 3 | (Austria) St. Pölten | 6 | 1 | 1 | 4 | 7 | 22 | −15 | 4 | | 2–8 | 3–4 | — | 1–1 |
| 4 | (Czech Republic) Slavia Prague | 6 | 0 | 2 | 4 | 1 | 8 | −7 | 2 | | 0–2 | 0–3 | 0–1 | — |

Source: UEFA

===== Group D =====
| Pos | Team | Pld | W | D | L | GF | GA | GD | Pts | Qualification | BAR | MUN | BEN | ROS |
|---|---|---|---|---|---|---|---|---|---|---|---|---|---|---|
| 1 | (Spain) Barcelona | 6 | 5 | 0 | 1 | 29 | 6 | +23 | 15 (Note: Tied on head-to-head points. Head-to-head goal difference: Barcelona +1, Bayern Munich −1.) | Advance to Quarter-finals | — | 3–0 | 9–0 | 6–0 |
| 2 | (Germany) Bayern Munich | 6 | 5 | 0 | 1 | 14 | 7 | +7 | 15 | Advance to Quarter-finals | 3–1 | — | 2–0 | 2–1 |
| 3 | (Portugal) Benfica | 6 | 2 | 0 | 4 | 8 | 21 | −13 | 6 | | 2–6 | 2–3 | — | 1–0 |
| 4 | (Sweden) Rosengård | 6 | 0 | 0 | 6 | 3 | 20 | −17 | 0 | | 1–4 | 0–4 | 1–3 | — |

Source: UEFA

==== Knockout phase ====
===== Quarter-finals =====
| Team 1 | Agg. | Team 2 | 1st leg | 2nd leg |
|---|---|---|---|---|
| Bayern Munich (Germany) | 1–2 | (England) Arsenal | 1–0 | 0–2 |
| Paris Saint-Germain (France) | 1–2 | (Germany) VfL Wolfsburg | 0–1 | 1–1 |

===== Semi-finals =====
| Team 1 | Agg. | Team 2 | 1st leg | 2nd leg |
|---|---|---|---|---|
| VfL Wolfsburg (Germany) | 5–4 | (England) Arsenal | 2–2 | 3–2 (a.e.t.) |

===== Final =====
3 June 2023
16:00 UTC+2

| Barcelona (Spain) | 3–2 | (Germany) VfL Wolfsburg |
|---|---|---|
| Guijarro 48', 50'; Rolfö 70' | Report | Pajor 3'; Popp 37' |

Philips Stadion, Eindhoven
Attendance: 33,147
Referee: Cheryl Foster (Wales)
