= 2022–23 UEFA Champions League knockout phase =

Europe premier club football tournament

The 2022–23 UEFA Champions League knockout phase began on 14 February with the round of 16 and ended on 10 June 2023 with the final at the Atatürk Olympic Stadium in Istanbul, Turkey, to decide the champions of the 2022–23 UEFA Champions League. A total of 16 teams competed in the knockout phase.

Times are CET/CEST, (Note: CET (UTC+1) for dates up to 25 March 2023 (round of 16), and CEST (UTC+2) for dates thereafter (quarter-finals, semi-finals and final).) as listed by UEFA (local times, if different, are in parentheses).

== Qualified teams ==
The knockout phase involved the 16 teams which qualified as winners and runners-up of each of the eight groups in the group stage.

Group	Winners (seeded in round of 16 draw)	Runners-up (unseeded in round of 16 draw)
A	(Italy) Napoli	(England) Liverpool
B	(Portugal) Porto	(Belgium) Club Brugge
C	(Germany) Bayern Munich	(Italy) Inter Milan
D	(England) Tottenham Hotspur	(Germany) Eintracht Frankfurt
E	(England) Chelsea	(Italy) Milan
F	(Spain) Real Madrid	(Germany) RB Leipzig
G	(England) Manchester City	(Germany) Borussia Dortmund
H	(Portugal) Benfica	(France) Paris Saint-Germain

== Format ==
Each tie in the knockout phase, apart from the final, was played over two legs, with each team playing one leg at home. The team that scored more goals on aggregate over the two legs advanced to the next round. If the aggregate score was level, then 30 minutes of extra time were played (the away goals rule was not applied). If the score was still level at the end of extra time, the winners were decided by a penalty shoot-out. In the final, which was played as a single match, if the score was level at the end of normal time, extra time was played, followed by a penalty shoot-out if the score was still level. The mechanism of the draws for each round was as follows:

- In the draw for the round of 16, the eight group winners were seeded, and the eight group runners-up were unseeded. The seeded teams were drawn against the unseeded teams, with the seeded teams hosting the second leg. Teams from the same group or the same association cannot be drawn against each other.
- In the draws for the quarter-finals onwards, there were no seedings, and teams from the same group or the same association could be drawn against each other. As the draws for the quarter-finals and semi-finals were held together before the quarter-finals were played, the identity of the quarter-final winners was not known at the time of the semi-final draw. A draw was also held to determine which semi-final winner was designated as the "home" team for the final (for administrative purposes as it was played at a neutral venue).

For the quarter-finals and semi-finals, teams from the same city (e.g. A.C. Milan and Inter Milan, who share the same stadium), were not scheduled to play at home on the same day or consecutive days, due to logistics and crowd control. To avoid such scheduling conflict, if the two teams were drawn to play at home for the same leg, the order of legs of the tie involving the team which was not titleholders of Champions League or Europa League (or lower-tier, if both were continental titleholders), or the team with the lower domestic ranking in the qualifying season (if neither team were continental title holder, e.g. Inter Milan for this season) was reversed from the original draw.

== Schedule ==
The schedule was as follows (all draws were held at the UEFA headquarters in Nyon, Switzerland).

Round	Draw date	First leg	Second leg
Round of 16	7 November 2022, 12:00	14–15 & 21–22 February 2023	7–8 & 14–15 March 2023
Quarter-finals	17 March 2023, 12:00	11–12 April 2023	18–19 April 2023
Semi-finals	17 March 2023, 12:00	9–10 May 2023	16–17 May 2023
Final	17 March 2023, 12:00	10 June 2023 at Atatürk Olympic Stadium, Istanbul	

== Bracket ==
Round of 16
(England) Liverpool	2	0	2
(Spain) Real Madrid	5	1	6
(Germany) Borussia Dortmund	1	0	1
(England) Chelsea	0	2	2
(Germany) RB Leipzig	1	0	1
(England) Manchester City	1	7	8
(France) Paris Saint-Germain	0	0	0
(Germany) Bayern Munich	1	2	3
(Italy) Milan	1	0	1
(England) Tottenham Hotspur	0	0	0
(Germany) Eintracht Frankfurt	0	0	0
(Italy) Napoli	2	3	5
(Belgium) Club Brugge	0	1	1
(Portugal) Benfica	2	5	7
(Italy) Inter Milan	1	0	1
(Portugal) Porto	0	0	0

Quarter-finals
(Spain) Real Madrid	2	2	4
(England) Chelsea	0	0	0
(England) Manchester City	3	1	4
(Germany) Bayern Munich	0	1	1
(Italy) Milan	1	1	2
(Italy) Napoli	0	1	1
(Portugal) Benfica	0	3	3
(Italy) Inter Milan	2	3	5

Semi-finals
(Spain) Real Madrid	1	0	1
(England) Manchester City	1	4	5
(Italy) Milan	0	0	0
(Italy) Inter Milan	2	1	3

Final
10 June – Istanbul
(England) Manchester City	1
(Italy) Inter Milan	0

== Round of 16 ==
The draw for the round of 16 was held on 7 November 2022, 12:00 CET.

=== Summary ===
The first legs were played on 14, 15, 21 and 22 February, and the second legs were played on 7, 8, 14 and 15 March 2023.

Team 1	Agg.	Team 2	1st leg	2nd leg
RB Leipzig (Germany)	1–8	(England) Manchester City	1–1	0–7
Club Brugge (Belgium)	1–7	(Portugal) Benfica	0–2	1–5
Liverpool (England)	2–6	(Spain) Real Madrid	2–5	0–1
Milan (Italy)	1–0	(England) Tottenham Hotspur	1–0	0–0
Eintracht Frankfurt (Germany)	0–5	(Italy) Napoli	0–2	0–3
Borussia Dortmund (Germany)	1–2	(England) Chelsea	1–0	0–2
Inter Milan (Italy)	1–0	(Portugal) Porto	1–0	0–0
Paris Saint-Germain (France)	0–3	(Germany) Bayern Munich	0–1	0–2

=== Matches ===
22 February 2023
21:00

RB Leipzig (Germany)	1–1	(England) Manchester City
Gvardiol 70'	Report	Mahrez 27'

Red Bull Arena, Leipzig
Attendance: 45,228
Referee: Serdar Gözübüyük (Netherlands)
14 March 2023
21:00 (20:00 UTC+0)

Manchester City (England)	7–0	(Germany) RB Leipzig
Haaland 22' (pen.), 24', 45+2', 53', 57'; Gündoğan 49'; De Bruyne 90+2'	Report

City of Manchester Stadium, Manchester
Attendance: 52,038
Referee: Slavko Vinčić (Slovenia)

Manchester City won 8–1 on aggregate.

15 February 2023
21:00

Club Brugge (Belgium)	0–2	(Portugal) Benfica
	Report	João Mário 51' (pen.); Neres 88'

Jan Breydel Stadium, Bruges
Attendance: 24,136
Referee: Davide Massa (Italy)
7 March 2023
21:00 (20:00 UTC+0)

Benfica (Portugal)	5–1	(Belgium) Club Brugge
R. Silva 38'; Ramos 45+2', 57'; João Mário 71' (pen.); Neres 77'	Report	Meijer 87'

Estádio da Luz, Lisbon
Attendance: 60,960
Referee: Halil Umut Meler (Turkey)

Benfica won 7–1 on aggregate.

21 February 2023
21:00 (20:00 UTC+0)

Liverpool (England)	2–5	(Spain) Real Madrid
Núñez 4'; Salah 14'	Report	Vinícius 21', 36'; Militão 47'; Benzema 55', 67'

Anfield, Liverpool
Attendance: 52,337
Referee: István Kovács (Romania)
15 March 2023
21:00

Real Madrid (Spain)	1–0	(England) Liverpool
Benzema 78'	Report

Santiago Bernabéu, Madrid
Attendance: 63,127
Referee: Felix Zwayer (Germany)

Real Madrid won 6–2 on aggregate.

14 February 2023
21:00

Milan (Italy)	1–0	(England) Tottenham Hotspur
Brahim 7'	Report

San Siro, Milan
Attendance: 74,320
Referee: Sandro Schärer (Switzerland)
8 March 2023
21:10 (20:10 UTC+0) (Note: The Tottenham Hotspur v Milan match, originally scheduled to kick-off at 21:00 (20:00 UTC+0), was delayed by ten minutes due to the late arrival of the bus to the stadium carrying Milan's team.)

Tottenham Hotspur (England)	0–0	(Italy) Milan
	Report

Tottenham Hotspur Stadium, London
Attendance: 61,602
Referee: Clément Turpin (France)

Milan won 1–0 on aggregate.

21 February 2023
21:00

Eintracht Frankfurt (Germany)	0–2	(Italy) Napoli
	Report	Osimhen 40'; Di Lorenzo 65'

Waldstadion, Frankfurt
Attendance: 47,500
Referee: Artur Soares Dias (Portugal)
15 March 2023
21:00

Napoli (Italy)	3–0	(Germany) Eintracht Frankfurt
Osimhen 45+2', 53'; Zieliński 64' (pen.)	Report

Stadio Diego Armando Maradona, Naples
Attendance: 49,082
Referee: Anthony Taylor (England)

Napoli won 5–0 on aggregate.

15 February 2023
21:00

Borussia Dortmund (Germany)	1–0	(England) Chelsea
Adeyemi 63'	Report

Westfalenstadion, Dortmund
Attendance: 81,365
Referee: Jesús Gil Manzano (Spain)
7 March 2023
21:10 (20:10 UTC+0) (Note: The Chelsea v Borussia Dortmund match, originally scheduled to kick-off at 21:00 (20:00 UTC+0), was delayed by ten minutes due to the late arrival of the bus to the stadium carrying Borussia Dortmund's team.)

Chelsea (England)	2–0	(Germany) Borussia Dortmund
Sterling 43'; Havertz 53' (pen.)	Report

Stamford Bridge, London
Attendance: 38,882
Referee: Danny Makkelie (Netherlands)

Chelsea won 2–1 on aggregate.

22 February 2023
21:00

Inter Milan (Italy)	1–0	(Portugal) Porto
Lukaku 86'	Report

San Siro, Milan
Attendance: 75,374
Referee: Srđan Jovanović (Serbia)
14 March 2023
21:00 (20:00 UTC+0)

Porto (Portugal)	0–0	(Italy) Inter Milan
	Report

Estádio do Dragão, Porto
Attendance: 48,015
Referee: Szymon Marciniak (Poland)

Inter Milan won 1–0 on aggregate.

14 February 2023
21:00

Paris Saint-Germain (France)	0–1	(Germany) Bayern Munich
	Report	Coman 53'

Parc des Princes, Paris
Attendance: 46,435
Referee: Michael Oliver (England)
8 March 2023
21:00

Bayern Munich (Germany)	2–0	(France) Paris Saint-Germain
Choupo-Moting 61'; Gnabry 89'	Report

Allianz Arena, Munich
Attendance: 75,000
Referee: Daniele Orsato (Italy)

Bayern Munich won 3–0 on aggregate.

== Quarter-finals ==
The draw for the quarter-finals was held on 17 March 2023, 12:00 CET.

=== Summary ===
The first legs were played on 11 and 12 April, and the second legs were played on 18 and 19 April 2023.

Team 1	Agg.	Team 2	1st leg	2nd leg
Real Madrid (Spain)	4–0	(England) Chelsea	2–0	2–0
Benfica (Portugal)	3–5 (Note: Order of legs reversed after original draw.)	(Italy) Inter Milan	0–2	3–3
Manchester City (England)	4–1	(Germany) Bayern Munich	3–0	1–1
Milan (Italy)	2–1	(Italy) Napoli	1–0	1–1

=== Matches ===
12 April 2023
21:00

Real Madrid (Spain)	2–0	(England) Chelsea
Benzema 21'; Asensio 74'	Report

Santiago Bernabéu, Madrid
Attendance: 63,142
Referee: François Letexier (France)
18 April 2023
21:00 (20:00 UTC+1)

Chelsea (England)	0–2	(Spain) Real Madrid
	Report	Rodrygo 58', 80'

Stamford Bridge, London
Attendance: 39,453
Referee: Daniele Orsato (Italy)

Real Madrid won 4–0 on aggregate.

11 April 2023
21:00 (20:00 UTC+1)

Benfica (Portugal)	0–2	(Italy) Inter Milan
	Report	Barella 51'; Lukaku 82' (pen.)

Estádio da Luz, Lisbon
Attendance: 62,594
Referee: Michael Oliver (England)
19 April 2023
21:00

Inter Milan (Italy)	3–3	(Portugal) Benfica
Barella 14'; Martínez 65'; Correa 78'	Report	Aursnes 38'; A. Silva 86'; Musa 90+5'

San Siro, Milan
Attendance: 75,380
Referee: Carlos del Cerro Grande (Spain)

Inter Milan won 5–3 on aggregate.

11 April 2023
21:00 (20:00 UTC+1)

Manchester City (England)	3–0	(Germany) Bayern Munich
Rodri 27'; Silva 70'; Haaland 76'	Report

City of Manchester Stadium, Manchester
Attendance: 52,257
Referee: Jesús Gil Manzano (Spain)
19 April 2023
21:00

Bayern Munich (Germany)	1–1	(England) Manchester City
Kimmich 83' (pen.)	Report	Haaland 57'

Allianz Arena, Munich
Attendance: 75,000
Referee: Clément Turpin (France)

Manchester City won 4–1 on aggregate.

12 April 2023
21:00

Milan (Italy)	1–0	(Italy) Napoli
Bennacer 40'	Report

San Siro, Milan
Attendance: 74,742
Referee: István Kovács (Romania)
18 April 2023
21:00

Napoli (Italy)	1–1	(Italy) Milan
Osimhen 90+3'	Report	Giroud 43'

Stadio Diego Armando Maradona, Naples
Attendance: 52,728
Referee: Szymon Marciniak (Poland)

Milan won 2–1 on aggregate.

== Semi-finals ==
The draw for the semi-finals was held on 17 March 2023, 12:00 CET, after the quarter-final draw.

=== Summary ===
The first legs were played on 9 and 10 May, and the second legs were played on 16 and 17 May 2023.

Team 1	Agg.	Team 2	1st leg	2nd leg
Milan (Italy)	0–3	(Italy) Inter Milan	0–2	0–1
Real Madrid (Spain)	1–5	(England) Manchester City	1–1	0–4

=== Matches ===
10 May 2023
21:00

Milan (Italy)	0–2	(Italy) Inter Milan
	Report	Džeko 8'; Mkhitaryan 11'

San Siro, Milan
Attendance: 75,532
Referee: Jesús Gil Manzano (Spain)
16 May 2023
21:00

Inter Milan (Italy)	1–0	(Italy) Milan
Martínez 74'	Report

San Siro, Milan
Attendance: 75,567
Referee: Clément Turpin (France)

Inter Milan won 3–0 on aggregate.

9 May 2023
21:00

Real Madrid (Spain)	1–1	(England) Manchester City
Vinícius 36'	Report	De Bruyne 67'

Santiago Bernabéu, Madrid
Attendance: 63,485
Referee: Artur Soares Dias (Portugal)
17 May 2023
21:00 (20:00 UTC+1)

Manchester City (England)	4–0	(Spain) Real Madrid
Silva 23', 37'; Akanji 76'; Alvarez 90+1'	Report

City of Manchester Stadium, Manchester
Attendance: 55,100
Referee: Szymon Marciniak (Poland)

Manchester City won 5–1 on aggregate.

== Final ==
The final was played on 10 June 2023 at the Atatürk Olympic Stadium in Istanbul. A draw was held on 17 March 2023, after the quarter-final and semi-final draws, to determine the "home" team for administrative purposes.

10 June 2023
21:00 (22:00 UTC+3)

Manchester City (The Football Association)	1–0	(Italian Football Federation) Inter Milan
Rodri 68'	Report

Atatürk Olympic Stadium, Istanbul
Attendance: 71,412
Referee: Szymon Marciniak (Poland)
