= 2022–23 UEFA Champions League group stage =

International football club competition in Europe

The 2022–23 UEFA Champions League group stage began on 6 September 2022 and ended on 2 November 2022. A total of 32 teams competed in the group stage to decide the 16 places in the knockout phase of the 2022–23 UEFA Champions League.

Eintracht Frankfurt made their debut appearance in the group stage, which was their first appearance in the European Cup since their loss in the 1960 final, after winning the 2021–22 UEFA Europa League. This was thus the first time that five German clubs played in the group stage.

A total of 15 national associations were represented in the group stage. This season was the first since the 1995–96 season in which a Turkish side failed to qualify for the group stage. It was also the first time since the 2007–08 season that two Scottish sides qualified for the group stage.

This year's Champions league featured both the eventual Champions league winners; Manchester City and Europa League winners, Sevilla in the same group (Group G)

== Draw ==
The draw for the group stage was held on 25 August 2022, 18:00 CEST (19:00 TRT), in Istanbul, Turkey. The 32 teams were drawn into eight groups of four. For the draw, the teams were seeded into four pots, each of eight teams, based on the following principles:

- Pot 1 contained the Europa League title holders, and the champions of the top seven associations based on their 2021–22 UEFA country coefficients.
- Pot 2, 3 and 4 contained the remaining teams, seeded based on their 2021–22 UEFA club coefficients.

Teams from the same association could not be drawn into the same group. Prior to the draw, UEFA formed pairings of teams from the same association (one pairing for associations with two or three teams, two pairings for associations with four or five teams) based on television audiences, where one team was drawn into Groups A–D and another team was drawn into Groups E–H, so that the two teams would play on different days. The following pairings were announced by UEFA after the group stage teams were confirmed:

1. (Spain) Real Madrid and Barcelona
2. (Germany) Eintracht Frankfurt and RB Leipzig
3. (England) Manchester City and Liverpool
4. (Italy) Milan and Napoli
5. (Germany) Bayern Munich and Borussia Dortmund
6. (France) Paris Saint-Germain and Marseille
7. (Portugal) Porto and Benfica
8. (England) Chelsea and Tottenham Hotspur
9. (Italy) Juventus and Inter Milan
10. (Spain) Atlético Madrid and Sevilla
11. (Scotland) Rangers and Celtic

On each matchday, one set of four groups played their matches on Tuesday, while the other set of four groups played their matches on Wednesday, with the two sets of groups alternating between each matchday. The fixtures were decided after the draw, using a computer draw not shown to public. Each team would not play more than two home matches or two away matches in a row, and would play one home match and one away match on the first and last matchdays (Regulations Article 16.02). This arrangement was different from previous seasons, where the same two teams would play at home on the first and last matchdays.

== Teams ==
Below were the participating teams (with their 2022 UEFA club coefficients), grouped by their seeding pot. They included:

- 26 teams which entered in this stage
- 6 winners of the play-off round (4 from Champions Path, 2 from League Path)

Key to colours
Group winners and runners-up advanced to round of 16
Third-placed teams entered Europa League knockout round play-offs

Pot 1 (by association rank)
Assoc.	Team	Notes	Coeff.
2	(Spain) Real Madrid		124.000
—	(Germany) Eintracht Frankfurt		61.000
1	(England) Manchester City		134.000
3	(Italy) Milan		38.000
4	(Germany) Bayern Munich		138.000
5	(France) Paris Saint-Germain		112.000
6	(Portugal) Porto		80.000
7	(Netherlands) Ajax		82.500

Pot 2
Team	Coeff.
(England) Liverpool	134.000
(England) Chelsea	123.000
(Spain) Barcelona	114.000
(Italy) Juventus	107.000
(Spain) Atlético Madrid	105.000
(Spain) Sevilla	91.000
(Germany) RB Leipzig	83.000
(England) Tottenham Hotspur	83.000

Pot 3
Team	Notes	Coeff.
(Germany) Borussia Dortmund		78.000
(Austria) Red Bull Salzburg		71.000
(Ukraine) Shakhtar Donetsk		71.000
(Italy) Inter Milan		67.000
(Italy) Napoli		66.000
(Portugal) Benfica		61.000
(Portugal) Sporting CP		55.500
(Germany) Bayer Leverkusen		53.000

Pot 4
Team	Notes	Coeff.
(Scotland) Rangers		50.250
(Croatia) Dinamo Zagreb		49.500
(France) Marseille		44.000
(Denmark) Copenhagen		40.500
(Belgium) Club Brugge		38.500
(Scotland) Celtic		33.000
(Czech Republic) Viktoria Plzeň		31.000
(Israel) Maccabi Haifa		7.000

Notes

1. ^{TH} Champions League title holders, automatically placed into Pot 1 as top seed.
2. ^{EL} Europa League title holders, automatically placed into Pot 1 as second top seed.
3. ^{CP} Winners of Champions Path.
4. ^{LP} Winners of League Path.

== Format ==
In each group, teams played against each other home-and-away in a round-robin format. The top two teams of each group advanced to the round of 16. The third-placed teams were transferred to the Europa League knockout round play-offs, while the fourth-placed teams were eliminated from European competitions for the season.

=== Tiebreakers ===
Teams were ranked according to points (3 points for a win, 1 point for a draw, 0 points for a loss). If two or more teams were tied on points, the following tiebreaking criteria were applied, in the order given, to determine the rankings (see Article 17 Equality of points – group stage, Regulations of the UEFA Champions League):

1. Points in head-to-head matches among the tied teams;
2. Goal difference in head-to-head matches among the tied teams;
3. Goals scored in head-to-head matches among the tied teams;
4. If more than two teams were tied, and after applying all head-to-head criteria above, a subset of teams were still tied, all head-to-head criteria above were reapplied exclusively to this subset of teams;
5. Goal difference in all group matches;
6. Goals scored in all group matches;
7. Away goals scored in all group matches;
8. Wins in all group matches;
9. Away wins in all group matches;
10. Disciplinary points (direct red card = 3 points; double yellow card = 3 points; single yellow card = 1 point);
11. UEFA club coefficient.

Due to the abolition of the away goals rule, head-to-head away goals were no longer applied as a tiebreaker starting from last season. However, total away goals were still applied as a tiebreaker.

== Groups ==
The fixtures were announced on 27 August 2022, two days after the draw. The matches were played on 6–7 September, 13–14 September, 4–5 October, 11–12 October, 25–26 October and 1–2 November 2022. The scheduled kick-off times were 18:45 (two matches on each day) and 21:00 (remaining six matches) CET/CEST.

Times are CET/CEST, (Note: CEST (UTC+2) for dates up to 29 October 2022 (matchdays 1–5), and CET (UTC+1) for dates thereafter (matchday 6).) as listed by UEFA (local times, if different, are in parentheses).

=== Group A ===
Pos	Team	Pld	W	D	L	GF	GA	GD	Pts	Qualification	NAP	LIV	AJX	RAN
1	(Italy) Napoli	6	5	0	1	20	6	+14	15 (Note: Tied on head-to-head points. Head-to-head goal difference: Napoli +1, Liverpool −1.)	Advance to knockout phase	—	4–1	4–2	3–0
2	(England) Liverpool	6	5	0	1	17	6	+11	15	Advance to knockout phase	2–0	—	2–1	2–0
3	(Netherlands) Ajax	6	2	0	4	11	16	−5	6	Transfer to Europa League	1–6	0–3	—	4–0
4	(Scotland) Rangers	6	0	0	6	2	22	−20	0		0–3	1–7	1–3	—

Source: UEFA
Rules for classification: Group stage tiebreakers
Notes:
7 September 2022
18:45

Ajax (Netherlands)	4–0	(Scotland) Rangers
Álvarez 17'; Berghuis 32'; Kudus 33'; Bergwijn 80'	Report

Johan Cruyff Arena, Amsterdam
Attendance: 52,862
Referee: Tobias Stieler (Germany)
7 September 2022
21:00

Napoli (Italy)	4–1	(England) Liverpool
Zieliński 5' (pen.), 47'; Zambo Anguissa 31'; Simeone 44'	Report	Díaz 49'

Stadio Diego Armando Maradona, Naples
Attendance: 51,793
Referee: Carlos del Cerro Grande (Spain)

13 September 2022
21:00 (20:00 UTC+1)

Liverpool (England)	2–1	(Netherlands) Ajax
Salah 17'; Matip 89'	Report	Kudus 27'

Anfield, Liverpool
Attendance: 52,387
Referee: Artur Soares Dias (Portugal)
14 September 2022
21:00 (20:00 UTC+1) (Note: The Rangers v Napoli match, originally scheduled to be played on 13 September 2022, 21:00 (20:00 UTC+1), was rescheduled to the following day at the same hour due to conditions related to the death of Elizabeth II.)

Rangers (Scotland)	0–3	(Italy) Napoli
	Report	Politano 68' (pen.); Raspadori 85'; Ndombele 90+1'

Ibrox Stadium, Glasgow
Attendance: 50,121
Referee: Antonio Mateu Lahoz (Spain)

4 October 2022
21:00 (20:00 UTC+1)

Liverpool (England)	2–0	(Scotland) Rangers
Alexander-Arnold 7'; Salah 53' (pen.)	Report

Anfield, Liverpool
Attendance: 49,512
Referee: Clément Turpin (France)
4 October 2022
21:00

Ajax (Netherlands)	1–6	(Italy) Napoli
Kudus 9'	Report	Raspadori 18', 47'; Di Lorenzo 33'; Zieliński 45'; Kvaratskhelia 63'; Simeone 81'

Johan Cruyff Arena, Amsterdam
Attendance: 52,896
Referee: François Letexier (France)

12 October 2022
18:45

Napoli (Italy)	4–2	(Netherlands) Ajax
Lozano 4'; Raspadori 16'; Kvaratskhelia 62' (pen.); Osimhen 89'	Report	Klaassen 49'; Bergwijn 83' (pen.)

Stadio Diego Armando Maradona, Naples
Attendance: 52,229
Referee: Felix Zwayer (Germany)
12 October 2022
21:00 (20:00 UTC+1)

Rangers (Scotland)	1–7	(England) Liverpool
Arfield 17'	Report	Firmino 24', 55'; Núñez 66'; Salah 76', 80', 81'; Elliott 87'

Ibrox Stadium, Glasgow
Attendance: 48,820
Referee: Slavko Vinčić (Slovenia)

26 October 2022
21:00

Napoli (Italy)	3–0	(Scotland) Rangers
Simeone 11', 16'; Østigård 80'	Report

Stadio Diego Armando Maradona, Naples
Attendance: 39,835
Referee: Halil Umut Meler (Turkey)
26 October 2022
21:00

Ajax (Netherlands)	0–3	(England) Liverpool
	Report	Salah 42'; Núñez 49'; Elliott 52'

Johan Cruyff Arena, Amsterdam
Attendance: 53,327
Referee: José María Sánchez Martínez (Spain)

1 November 2022
21:00 (20:00 UTC+0)

Liverpool (England)	2–0	(Italy) Napoli
Salah 85'; Núñez 90+8'	Report

Anfield, Liverpool
Attendance: 52,077
Referee: Tobias Stieler (Germany)
1 November 2022
21:00 (20:00 UTC+0)

Rangers (Scotland)	1–3	(Netherlands) Ajax
Tavernier 87' (pen.)	Report	Berghuis 4'; Kudus 29'; Conceição 89'

Ibrox Stadium, Glasgow
Attendance: 48,817
Referee: Glenn Nyberg (Sweden)

=== Group B ===
Pos	Team	Pld	W	D	L	GF	GA	GD	Pts	Qualification	POR	BRU	LEV	ATM
1	(Portugal) Porto	6	4	0	2	12	7	+5	12	Advance to knockout phase	—	0–4	2–0	2–1
2	(Belgium) Club Brugge	6	3	2	1	7	4	+3	11	Advance to knockout phase	0–4	—	1–0	2–0
3	(Germany) Bayer Leverkusen	6	1	2	3	4	8	−4	5 (Note: Head-to-head points: Bayer Leverkusen 4, Atlético Madrid 1.)	Transfer to Europa League	0–3	0–0	—	2–0
4	(Spain) Atlético Madrid	6	1	2	3	5	9	−4	5		2–1	0–0	2–2	—

Source: UEFA
Rules for classification: Group stage tiebreakers
Notes:
7 September 2022
21:00

Atlético Madrid (Spain)	2–1	(Portugal) Porto
Hermoso 90+1'; Griezmann 90+11'	Report	Uribe 90+6' (pen.)

Metropolitano Stadium, Madrid
Attendance: 51,777
Referee: Szymon Marciniak (Poland)
7 September 2022
21:00

Club Brugge (Belgium)	1–0	(Germany) Bayer Leverkusen
Sylla 42'	Report

Jan Breydel Stadium, Bruges
Attendance: 21,235
Referee: Irfan Peljto (Bosnia and Herzegovina)

13 September 2022
21:00 (20:00 UTC+1)

Porto (Portugal)	0–4	(Belgium) Club Brugge
	Report	Jutglà 15' (pen.); Sowah 47'; Skov Olsen 52'; Nusa 89'

Estádio do Dragão, Porto
Attendance: 39,225
Referee: Anastasios Sidiropoulos (Greece)
13 September 2022
21:00

Bayer Leverkusen (Germany)	2–0	(Spain) Atlético Madrid
Andrich 84'; Diaby 87'	Report

BayArena, Leverkusen
Attendance: 25,825
Referee: Michael Oliver (England)

4 October 2022
21:00 (20:00 UTC+1)

Porto (Portugal)	2–0	(Germany) Bayer Leverkusen
Sanusi 69'; Galeno 87'	Report

Estádio do Dragão, Porto
Attendance: 42,399
Referee: Anthony Taylor (England)
4 October 2022
21:00

Club Brugge (Belgium)	2–0	(Spain) Atlético Madrid
Sowah 36'; Jutglà 62'	Report

Jan Breydel Stadium, Bruges
Attendance: 25,667
Referee: István Kovács (Romania)

12 October 2022
18:45

Atlético Madrid (Spain)	0–0	(Belgium) Club Brugge
	Report

Metropolitano Stadium, Madrid
Attendance: 60,810
Referee: Danny Makkelie (Netherlands)
12 October 2022
21:00

Bayer Leverkusen (Germany)	0–3	(Portugal) Porto
	Report	Galeno 6'; Taremi 53' (pen.), 64' (pen.)

BayArena, Leverkusen
Attendance: 30,210
Referee: István Kovács (Romania)

26 October 2022
18:45

Club Brugge (Belgium)	0–4	(Portugal) Porto
	Report	Taremi 33', 70'; Evanilson 57'; Eustáquio 60'

Jan Breydel Stadium, Bruges
Attendance: 26,144
Referee: Michael Oliver (England)
26 October 2022
21:00

Atlético Madrid (Spain)	2–2	(Germany) Bayer Leverkusen
Carrasco 22'; De Paul 50'	Report	Diaby 9'; Hudson-Odoi 29'

Metropolitano Stadium, Madrid
Attendance: 63,803
Referee: Clément Turpin (France)

1 November 2022
18:45 (17:45 UTC+0)

Porto (Portugal)	2–1	(Spain) Atlético Madrid
Taremi 5'; Eustáquio 24'	Report	Marcano 90+5' (o.g.)

Estádio do Dragão, Porto
Attendance: 47,546
Referee: Daniele Orsato (Italy)
1 November 2022
18:45

Bayer Leverkusen (Germany)	0–0	(Belgium) Club Brugge
	Report

BayArena, Leverkusen
Attendance: 30,210
Referee: Maurizio Mariani (Italy)

=== Group C ===
Pos	Team	Pld	W	D	L	GF	GA	GD	Pts	Qualification	BAY	INT	BAR	PLZ
1	(Germany) Bayern Munich	6	6	0	0	18	2	+16	18	Advance to knockout phase	—	2–0	2–0	5–0
2	(Italy) Inter Milan	6	3	1	2	10	7	+3	10	Advance to knockout phase	0–2	—	1–0	4–0
3	(Spain) Barcelona	6	2	1	3	12	12	0	7	Transfer to Europa League	0–3	3–3	—	5–1
4	(Czech Republic) Viktoria Plzeň	6	0	0	6	5	24	−19	0		2–4	0–2	2–4	—

Source: UEFA
Rules for classification: Group stage tiebreakers
7 September 2022
21:00

Barcelona (Spain)	5–1	(Czech Republic) Viktoria Plzeň
Kessié 13'; Lewandowski 34', 45+3', 67'; Torres 71'	Report	Sýkora 44'

Camp Nou, Barcelona
Attendance: 77,411
Referee: Lawrence Visser (Belgium)
7 September 2022
21:00

Inter Milan (Italy)	0–2	(Germany) Bayern Munich
	Report	Sané 25'; D'Ambrosio 66' (o.g.)

San Siro, Milan
Attendance: 58,951
Referee: Clément Turpin (France)

13 September 2022
18:45

Viktoria Plzeň (Czech Republic)	0–2	(Italy) Inter Milan
	Report	Džeko 20'; Dumfries 70'

Doosan Arena, Plzeň
Attendance: 11,252
Referee: Sandro Schärer (Switzerland)
13 September 2022
21:00

Bayern Munich (Germany)	2–0	(Spain) Barcelona
Hernandez 50'; Sané 54'	Report

Allianz Arena, Munich
Attendance: 75,000
Referee: Danny Makkelie (Netherlands)

4 October 2022
18:45

Bayern Munich (Germany)	5–0	(Czech Republic) Viktoria Plzeň
Sané 7', 50'; Gnabry 13'; Mané 21'; Choupo-Moting 59'	Report

Allianz Arena, Munich
Attendance: 75,000
Referee: Nikola Dabanović (Montenegro)
4 October 2022
21:00

Inter Milan (Italy)	1–0	(Spain) Barcelona
Çalhanoğlu 45+2'	Report

San Siro, Milan
Attendance: 71,368
Referee: Slavko Vinčić (Slovenia)

12 October 2022
21:00

Barcelona (Spain)	3–3	(Italy) Inter Milan
Dembélé 40'; Lewandowski 82', 90+2'	Report	Barella 50'; Martínez 63'; Gosens 89'

Camp Nou, Barcelona
Attendance: 92,302
Referee: Szymon Marciniak (Poland)
12 October 2022
21:00

Viktoria Plzeň (Czech Republic)	2–4	(Germany) Bayern Munich
Vlkanova 62'; Kliment 75'	Report	Mané 10'; Müller 14'; Goretzka 25', 35'

Doosan Arena, Plzeň
Attendance: 11,326
Referee: Bartosz Frankowski (Poland)

26 October 2022
18:45

Inter Milan (Italy)	4–0	(Czech Republic) Viktoria Plzeň
Mkhitaryan 35'; Džeko 42', 66'; Lukaku 87'	Report

San Siro, Milan
Attendance: 71,849
Referee: Andreas Ekberg (Sweden)
26 October 2022
21:00

Barcelona (Spain)	0–3	(Germany) Bayern Munich
	Report	Mané 10'; Choupo-Moting 31'; Pavard 90+5'

Camp Nou, Barcelona
Attendance: 84,016
Referee: Anthony Taylor (England)

1 November 2022
21:00

Bayern Munich (Germany)	2–0	(Italy) Inter Milan
Pavard 32'; Choupo-Moting 72'	Report

Allianz Arena, Munich
Attendance: 75,000
Referee: Ivan Kružliak (Slovakia)
1 November 2022
21:00

Viktoria Plzeň (Czech Republic)	2–4	(Spain) Barcelona
Chorý 51' (pen.), 63'	Report	Alonso 6'; Torres 44', 54'; Torre 75'

Doosan Arena, Plzeň
Attendance: 11,258
Referee: Radu Petrescu (Romania)

=== Group D ===
Pos	Team	Pld	W	D	L	GF	GA	GD	Pts	Qualification	TOT	FRA	SPO	MAR
1	(England) Tottenham Hotspur	6	3	2	1	8	6	+2	11	Advance to knockout phase	—	3–2	1–1	2–0
2	(Germany) Eintracht Frankfurt	6	3	1	2	7	8	−1	10	Advance to knockout phase	0–0	—	0–3	2–1
3	(Portugal) Sporting CP	6	2	1	3	8	9	−1	7	Transfer to Europa League	2–0	1–2	—	0–2
4	(France) Marseille	6	2	0	4	8	8	0	6		1–2	0–1	4–1	—

Source: UEFA
Rules for classification: Group stage tiebreakers
7 September 2022
18:45

Eintracht Frankfurt (Germany)	0–3	(Portugal) Sporting CP
	Report	Edwards 65'; Trincão 67'; Santos 82'

Waldstadion, Frankfurt
Attendance: 50,500
Referee: Orel Grinfeld (Israel)
7 September 2022
21:00 (20:00 UTC+1)

Tottenham Hotspur (England)	2–0	(France) Marseille
Richarlison 76', 81'	Report

Tottenham Hotspur Stadium, London
Attendance: 57,367
Referee: Slavko Vinčić (Slovenia)

13 September 2022
18:45 (17:45 UTC+1)

Sporting CP (Portugal)	2–0	(England) Tottenham Hotspur
Paulinho 90'; Arthur 90+3'	Report

Estádio José Alvalade, Lisbon
Attendance: 39,899
Referee: Srđan Jovanović (Serbia)
13 September 2022
21:00

Marseille (France)	0–1	(Germany) Eintracht Frankfurt
	Report	Lindstrøm 43'

Stade Vélodrome, Marseille
Attendance: 62,500
Referee: José María Sánchez Martínez (Spain)

4 October 2022
19:05 (Note: The Marseille v Sporting CP match, originally scheduled to be played at 18:45, was delayed to 19:05 after the visiting team's bus was caught in traffic and arrived late at the stadium.)

Marseille (France)	4–1	(Portugal) Sporting CP
Sánchez 13'; Harit 16'; Balerdi 28'; Mbemba 84'	Report	Trincão 1'

Stade Vélodrome, Marseille
Attendance: 618
Referee: Davide Massa (Italy)
4 October 2022
21:00

Eintracht Frankfurt (Germany)	0–0	(England) Tottenham Hotspur
	Report

Waldstadion, Frankfurt
Attendance: 50,500
Referee: Daniele Orsato (Italy)

12 October 2022
21:00 (20:00 UTC+1)

Tottenham Hotspur (England)	3–2	(Germany) Eintracht Frankfurt
Son Heung-min 19', 36'; Kane 28' (pen.)	Report	Kamada 14'; Alidou 87'

Tottenham Hotspur Stadium, London
Attendance: 55,180
Referee: Carlos del Cerro Grande (Spain)
12 October 2022
21:00 (20:00 UTC+1)

Sporting CP (Portugal)	0–2	(France) Marseille
	Report	Guendouzi 20' (pen.); Sánchez 30'

Estádio José Alvalade, Lisbon
Attendance: 38,126
Referee: Alejandro Hernández Hernández (Spain)

26 October 2022
21:00 (20:00 UTC+1)

Tottenham Hotspur (England)	1–1	(Portugal) Sporting CP
Bentancur 80'	Report	Edwards 22'

Tottenham Hotspur Stadium, London
Attendance: 59,588
Referee: Danny Makkelie (Netherlands)
26 October 2022
21:00

Eintracht Frankfurt (Germany)	2–1	(France) Marseille
Kamada 3'; Kolo Muani 27'	Report	Guendouzi 22'

Waldstadion, Frankfurt
Attendance: 48,700
Referee: Jesús Gil Manzano (Spain)

1 November 2022
21:00 (20:00 UTC+0)

Sporting CP (Portugal)	1–2	(Germany) Eintracht Frankfurt
Arthur 39'	Report	Kamada 62' (pen.); Kolo Muani 72'

Estádio José Alvalade, Lisbon
Attendance: 41,744
Referee: Slavko Vinčić (Slovenia)
1 November 2022
21:00

Marseille (France)	1–2	(England) Tottenham Hotspur
Mbemba 45+2'	Report	Lenglet 54'; Højbjerg 90+5'

Stade Vélodrome, Marseille
Attendance: 50,768
Referee: Szymon Marciniak (Poland)

=== Group E ===
Pos	Team	Pld	W	D	L	GF	GA	GD	Pts	Qualification	CHE	MIL	SAL	DZG
1	(England) Chelsea	6	4	1	1	10	4	+6	13	Advance to knockout phase	—	3–0	1–1	2–1
2	(Italy) Milan	6	3	1	2	12	7	+5	10	Advance to knockout phase	0–2	—	4–0	3–1
3	(Austria) Red Bull Salzburg	6	1	3	2	5	9	−4	6	Transfer to Europa League	1–2	1–1	—	1–0
4	(Croatia) Dinamo Zagreb	6	1	1	4	4	11	−7	4		1–0	0–4	1–1	—

Source: UEFA
Rules for classification: Group stage tiebreakers
6 September 2022
18:45

Dinamo Zagreb (Croatia)	1–0	(England) Chelsea
Oršić 13'	Report

Stadion Maksimir, Zagreb
Attendance: 20,607
Referee: István Kovács (Romania)
6 September 2022
21:00

Red Bull Salzburg (Austria)	1–1	(Italy) Milan
Okafor 28'	Report	Saelemaekers 40'

Red Bull Arena, Salzburg
Attendance: 29,520
Referee: Srđan Jovanović (Serbia)

14 September 2022
18:45

Milan (Italy)	3–1	(Croatia) Dinamo Zagreb
Giroud 45' (pen.); Saelemaekers 47'; Pobega 77'	Report	Oršić 56'

San Siro, Milan
Attendance: 61,341
Referee: Jesús Gil Manzano (Spain)
14 September 2022
21:00 (20:00 UTC+1)

Chelsea (England)	1–1	(Austria) Red Bull Salzburg
Sterling 48'	Report	Okafor 75'

Stamford Bridge, London
Attendance: 38,818
Referee: Ivan Kružliak (Slovakia)

5 October 2022
18:45

Red Bull Salzburg (Austria)	1–0	(Croatia) Dinamo Zagreb
Okafor 71' (pen.)	Report

Red Bull Arena, Salzburg
Attendance: 28,864
Referee: Andris Treimanis (Latvia)
5 October 2022
21:00 (20:00 UTC+1)

Chelsea (England)	3–0	(Italy) Milan
Fofana 24'; Aubameyang 56'; James 61'	Report

Stamford Bridge, London
Attendance: 39,537
Referee: Danny Makkelie (Netherlands)

11 October 2022
21:00

Dinamo Zagreb (Croatia)	1–1	(Austria) Red Bull Salzburg
Ljubičić 40'	Report	Seiwald 12'

Stadion Maksimir, Zagreb
Attendance: 20,779
Referee: Tobias Stieler (Germany)
11 October 2022
21:00

Milan (Italy)	0–2	(England) Chelsea
	Report	Jorginho 21' (pen.); Aubameyang 34'

San Siro, Milan
Attendance: 75,051
Referee: Daniel Siebert (Germany)

25 October 2022
18:45

Red Bull Salzburg (Austria)	1–2	(England) Chelsea
Adamu 48'	Report	Kovačić 23'; Havertz 64'

Red Bull Arena, Salzburg
Attendance: 29,520
Referee: Sandro Schärer (Switzerland)
25 October 2022
21:00

Dinamo Zagreb (Croatia)	0–4	(Italy) Milan
	Report	Gabbia 39'; Leão 49'; Giroud 59' (pen.); Ljubičić 69' (o.g.)

Stadion Maksimir, Zagreb
Attendance: 20,572
Referee: Szymon Marciniak (Poland)

2 November 2022
21:00 (20:00 UTC+0)

Chelsea (England)	2–1	(Croatia) Dinamo Zagreb
Sterling 18'; Zakaria 30'	Report	Petković 7'

Stamford Bridge, London
Attendance: 39,392
Referee: François Letexier (France)
2 November 2022
21:00

Milan (Italy)	4–0	(Austria) Red Bull Salzburg
Giroud 14', 57'; Krunić 46'; Messias 90+1'	Report

San Siro, Milan
Attendance: 74,292
Referee: Antonio Mateu Lahoz (Spain)

=== Group F ===
Pos	Team	Pld	W	D	L	GF	GA	GD	Pts	Qualification	RMA	RBL	SHK	CEL
1	(Spain) Real Madrid	6	4	1	1	15	6	+9	13	Advance to knockout phase	—	2–0	2–1	5–1
2	(Germany) RB Leipzig	6	4	0	2	13	9	+4	12	Advance to knockout phase	3–2	—	1–4	3–1
3	(Ukraine) Shakhtar Donetsk	6	1	3	2	8	10	−2	6	Transfer to Europa League	1–1	0–4	—	1–1
4	(Scotland) Celtic	6	0	2	4	4	15	−11	2		0–3	0–2	1–1	—

Source: UEFA
Rules for classification: Group stage tiebreakers
6 September 2022
21:00 (20:00 UTC+1)

Celtic (Scotland)	0–3	(Spain) Real Madrid
	Report	Vinícius 56'; Modrić 60'; Hazard 77'

Celtic Park, Glasgow
Attendance: 57,057
Referee: Sandro Schärer (Switzerland)
6 September 2022
21:00

RB Leipzig (Germany)	1–4	(Ukraine) Shakhtar Donetsk
Simakan 57'	Report	Shved 16', 58'; Mudryk 76'; Traoré 85'

Red Bull Arena, Leipzig
Attendance: 41,591
Referee: João Pinheiro (Portugal)

14 September 2022
18:45

Shakhtar Donetsk (Ukraine)	1–1	(Scotland) Celtic
Mudryk 29'	Report	Bondarenko 10' (o.g.)

Stadion Wojska Polskiego, Warsaw, Poland (Note: Due to the Russian invasion of Ukraine, Ukrainian teams were required to play their home matches at neutral venues until further notice. Therefore, Shakhtar Donetsk played at Stadion Wojska Polskiego, Warsaw, Poland, instead of their regular stadium Donbas Arena, Donetsk.)
Attendance: 20,697
Referee: Glenn Nyberg (Sweden)
14 September 2022
21:00

Real Madrid (Spain)	2–0	(Germany) RB Leipzig
Valverde 80'; Asensio 90+1'	Report

Santiago Bernabéu, Madrid
Attendance: 54,289
Referee: Maurizio Mariani (Italy)

5 October 2022
18:45

RB Leipzig (Germany)	3–1	(Scotland) Celtic
Nkunku 27'; Silva 64', 77'	Report	Jota 47'

Red Bull Arena, Leipzig
Attendance: 45,228
Referee: Espen Eskås (Norway)
5 October 2022
21:00

Real Madrid (Spain)	2–1	(Ukraine) Shakhtar Donetsk
Rodrygo 13'; Vinícius 28'	Report	Zubkov 39'

Santiago Bernabéu, Madrid
Attendance: 56,011
Referee: Ivan Kružliak (Slovakia)

11 October 2022
21:00

Shakhtar Donetsk (Ukraine)	1–1	(Spain) Real Madrid
Zubkov 46'	Report	Rüdiger 90+5'

Stadion Wojska Polskiego, Warsaw, Poland
Attendance: 29,030
Referee: Orel Grinfeld (Israel)
11 October 2022
21:00 (20:00 UTC+1)

Celtic (Scotland)	0–2	(Germany) RB Leipzig
	Report	Werner 75'; Forsberg 84'

Celtic Park, Glasgow
Attendance: 57,565
Referee: Halil Umut Meler (Turkey)

25 October 2022
21:00 (20:00 UTC+1)

Celtic (Scotland)	1–1	(Ukraine) Shakhtar Donetsk
Giakoumakis 34'	Report	Mudryk 58'

Celtic Park, Glasgow
Attendance: 57,478
Referee: Serdar Gözübüyük (Netherlands)
25 October 2022
21:00

RB Leipzig (Germany)	3–2	(Spain) Real Madrid
Gvardiol 13'; Nkunku 18'; Werner 81'	Report	Vinícius 44'; Rodrygo 90+3' (pen.)

Red Bull Arena, Leipzig
Attendance: 45,228
Referee: Daniele Orsato (Italy)

2 November 2022
18:45

Real Madrid (Spain)	5–1	(Scotland) Celtic
Modrić 6' (pen.); Rodrygo 21' (pen.); Asensio 51'; Vinícius 61'; Valverde 71'	Report	Jota 84'

Santiago Bernabéu, Madrid
Attendance: 52,511
Referee: Stéphanie Frappart (France)
2 November 2022
18:45

Shakhtar Donetsk (Ukraine)	0–4	(Germany) RB Leipzig
	Report	Nkunku 10'; Silva 50'; Szoboszlai 62'; Bondar 68' (o.g.)

Stadion Wojska Polskiego, Warsaw, Poland
Attendance: 26,045
Referee: Michael Oliver (England)

=== Group G ===
Pos	Team	Pld	W	D	L	GF	GA	GD	Pts	Qualification	MCI	DOR	SEV	CPH
1	(England) Manchester City	6	4	2	0	14	2	+12	14	Advance to knockout phase	—	2–1	3–1	5–0
2	(Germany) Borussia Dortmund	6	2	3	1	10	5	+5	9	Advance to knockout phase	0–0	—	1–1	3–0
3	(Spain) Sevilla	6	1	2	3	6	12	−6	5	Transfer to Europa League	0–4	1–4	—	3–0
4	(Denmark) Copenhagen	6	0	3	3	1	12	−11	3		0–0	1–1	0–0	—

Source: UEFA
Rules for classification: Group stage tiebreakers
6 September 2022
18:45

Borussia Dortmund (Germany)	3–0	(Denmark) Copenhagen
Reus 35'; Guerreiro 42'; Bellingham 83'	Report

Westfalenstadion, Dortmund
Attendance: 70,700
Referee: François Letexier (France)
6 September 2022
21:00

Sevilla (Spain)	0–4	(England) Manchester City
	Report	Haaland 20', 67'; Foden 58'; Dias 90+2'

Ramón Sánchez Pizjuán, Seville
Attendance: 38,764
Referee: Davide Massa (Italy)

14 September 2022
21:00 (20:00 UTC+1)

Manchester City (England)	2–1	(Germany) Borussia Dortmund
Stones 80'; Haaland 84'	Report	Bellingham 56'

City of Manchester Stadium, Manchester
Attendance: 50,441
Referee: Daniele Orsato (Italy)
14 September 2022
21:00

Copenhagen (Denmark)	0–0	(Spain) Sevilla
	Report

Parken Stadium, Copenhagen
Attendance: 34,910
Referee: Irfan Peljto (Bosnia and Herzegovina)

5 October 2022
21:00 (20:00 UTC+1)

Manchester City (England)	5–0	(Denmark) Copenhagen
Haaland 7', 32'; Khocholava 39' (o.g.); Mahrez 55' (pen.); Alvarez 76'	Report

City of Manchester Stadium, Manchester
Attendance: 51,765
Referee: Donatas Rumšas (Lithuania)
5 October 2022
21:00

Sevilla (Spain)	1–4	(Germany) Borussia Dortmund
En-Nesyri 51'	Report	Guerreiro 6'; Bellingham 41'; Adeyemi 43'; Brandt 75'

Ramón Sánchez Pizjuán, Seville
Attendance: 34,598
Referee: Maurizio Mariani (Italy)

11 October 2022
18:45

Copenhagen (Denmark)	0–0	(England) Manchester City
	Report

Parken Stadium, Copenhagen
Attendance: 35,447
Referee: Artur Soares Dias (Portugal)
11 October 2022
21:00

Borussia Dortmund (Germany)	1–1	(Spain) Sevilla
Bellingham 35'	Report	Nianzou 18'

Westfalenstadion, Dortmund
Attendance: 81,000
Referee: Srđan Jovanović (Serbia)

25 October 2022
18:45

Sevilla (Spain)	3–0	(Denmark) Copenhagen
En-Nesyri 61'; Isco 88'; Montiel 90+2'	Report

Ramón Sánchez Pizjuán, Seville
Attendance: 29,884
Referee: Benoît Bastien (France)
25 October 2022
21:00

Borussia Dortmund (Germany)	0–0	(England) Manchester City
	Report

Westfalenstadion, Dortmund
Attendance: 81,000
Referee: Davide Massa (Italy)

2 November 2022
21:00 (20:00 UTC+0)

Manchester City (England)	3–1	(Spain) Sevilla
Lewis 52'; Alvarez 73'; Mahrez 83'	Report	Mir 31'

City of Manchester Stadium, Manchester
Attendance: 51,610
Referee: Orel Grinfeld (Israel)
2 November 2022
21:00

Copenhagen (Denmark)	1–1	(Germany) Borussia Dortmund
Haraldsson 41'	Report	Hazard 23'

Parken Stadium, Copenhagen
Attendance: 31,900
Referee: Aliyar Aghayev (Azerbaijan)

=== Group H ===
Pos	Team	Pld	W	D	L	GF	GA	GD	Pts	Qualification	BEN	PAR	JUV	MHA
1	(Portugal) Benfica	6	4	2	0	16	7	+9	14 (Note: Tied on head-to-head results, overall goal difference and overall goals scored. Overall away goals scored: Benfica 9, Paris Saint-Germain 6.)	Advance to knockout phase	—	1–1	4–3	2–0
2	(France) Paris Saint-Germain	6	4	2	0	16	7	+9	14	Advance to knockout phase	1–1	—	2–1	7–2
3	(Italy) Juventus	6	1	0	5	9	13	−4	3 (Note: Tied on head-to-head results. Overall goal difference is used as the tiebreaker.)	Transfer to Europa League	1–2	1–2	—	3–1
4	(Israel) Maccabi Haifa	6	1	0	5	7	21	−14	3		1–6	1–3	2–0	—

Source: UEFA
Rules for classification: Group stage tiebreakers
Notes:
6 September 2022
21:00

Paris Saint-Germain (France)	2–1	(Italy) Juventus
Mbappé 5', 22'	Report	McKennie 53'

Parc des Princes, Paris
Attendance: 47,415
Referee: Anthony Taylor (England)
6 September 2022
21:00 (20:00 UTC+1)

Benfica (Portugal)	2–0	(Israel) Maccabi Haifa
R. Silva 50'; Grimaldo 54'	Report

Estádio da Luz, Lisbon
Attendance: 55,130
Referee: Andreas Ekberg (Sweden)

14 September 2022
21:00

Juventus (Italy)	1–2	(Portugal) Benfica
Milik 4'	Report	João Mário 43' (pen.); Neres 55'

Juventus Stadium, Turin
Attendance: 34,015
Referee: Felix Zwayer (Germany)
14 September 2022
21:00 (22:00 UTC+3)

Maccabi Haifa (Israel)	1–3	(France) Paris Saint-Germain
Chery 24'	Report	Messi 37'; Mbappé 69'; Neymar 88'

Sammy Ofer Stadium, Haifa
Attendance: 30,421
Referee: Daniel Siebert (Germany)

5 October 2022
21:00

Juventus (Italy)	3–1	(Israel) Maccabi Haifa
Rabiot 35', 83'; Vlahović 50'	Report	David 75'

Juventus Stadium, Turin
Attendance: 28,498
Referee: Sandro Schärer (Switzerland)
5 October 2022
21:00 (20:00 UTC+1)

Benfica (Portugal)	1–1	(France) Paris Saint-Germain
Pereira 41' (o.g.)	Report	Messi 22'

Estádio da Luz, Lisbon
Attendance: 62,295
Referee: Jesús Gil Manzano (Spain)

11 October 2022
18:45 (19:45 UTC+3)

Maccabi Haifa (Israel)	2–0	(Italy) Juventus
Atzili 7', 42'	Report

Sammy Ofer Stadium, Haifa
Attendance: 30,074
Referee: Antonio Mateu Lahoz (Spain)
11 October 2022
21:00

Paris Saint-Germain (France)	1–1	(Portugal) Benfica
Mbappé 40' (pen.)	Report	João Mário 62' (pen.)

Parc des Princes, Paris
Attendance: 46,435
Referee: Michael Oliver (England)

25 October 2022
21:00

Paris Saint-Germain (France)	7–2	(Israel) Maccabi Haifa
Messi 19', 44'; Mbappé 32', 64'; Neymar 35'; Goldberg 67' (o.g.); Soler 84'	Report	Seck 38', 50'

Parc des Princes, Paris
Attendance: 46,435
Referee: Felix Zwayer (Germany)
25 October 2022
21:00 (20:00 UTC+1)

Benfica (Portugal)	4–3	(Italy) Juventus
A. Silva 17'; João Mário 28' (pen.); R. Silva 35', 50'	Report	Kean 21'; Milik 77'; McKennie 79'

Estádio da Luz, Lisbon
Attendance: 60,131
Referee: Srđan Jovanović (Serbia)

2 November 2022
21:00

Juventus (Italy)	1–2	(France) Paris Saint-Germain
Bonucci 39'	Report	Mbappé 13'; Mendes 69'

Juventus Stadium, Turin
Attendance: 41,089
Referee: Carlos del Cerro Grande (Spain)
2 November 2022
21:00 (22:00 UTC+2)

Maccabi Haifa (Israel)	1–6	(Portugal) Benfica
Chery 26' (pen.)	Report	Ramos 20'; Musa 59'; Grimaldo 69'; R. Silva 73'; Araújo 88'; João Mário 90+2'

Sammy Ofer Stadium, Haifa
Attendance: 30,464
Referee: Anthony Taylor (England)
