= 2022–23 UEFA Youth League group stage =

Football tournament group stage

The 2022–23 UEFA Youth League UEFA Champions League Path (group stage) began on 6 September and concluded on 2 November 2022. A total of 32 teams competed in the group stage of the UEFA Champions League Path to decide 16 of the 24 places in the knockout phase (play-offs and the round of 16 onwards) of the 2022–23 UEFA Youth League.

== Draw ==
The youth teams of the 32 clubs which qualified for the 2022–23 UEFA Champions League group stage entered the UEFA Champions League Path. If there was a vacancy (youth teams not entering), it was filled by a team defined by UEFA.

For the UEFA Champions League Path, the 32 teams were drawn into eight groups of four. There was no separate draw held, with the group compositions identical to the draw for the 2022–23 UEFA Champions League group stage, which was held on 25 August 2022, 18:00 CEST (19:00 TRT), in Istanbul, Turkey.

Key to colours
Group winners advanced to round of 16
Group runners-up advanced to play-offs

Pot 1 Team (Royal Spanish Football Federation) Real Madrid (German Football Association) Eintracht Frankfurt (The Football Association) Manchester City (Italian Football Federation) Milan (German Football Association) Bayern Munich (French Football Federation) Paris Saint-Germain (Portuguese Football Federation) Porto (Royal Dutch Football Association) Ajax	Pot 2 Team (The Football Association) Liverpool (The Football Association) Chelsea (Royal Spanish Football Federation) Barcelona (Italian Football Federation) Juventus (Royal Spanish Football Federation) Atlético Madrid (Royal Spanish Football Federation) Sevilla (German Football Association) RB Leipzig (The Football Association) Tottenham Hotspur	Pot 3 Team (German Football Association) Borussia Dortmund (Austrian Football Association) FC Salzburg (Ukrainian Association of Football) Shakhtar Donetsk (Italian Football Federation) Inter Milan (Italian Football Federation) Napoli (Portuguese Football Federation) Benfica (Portuguese Football Federation) Sporting CP (German Football Association) Bayer Leverkusen	Pot 4 Team (Scottish Football Association) Rangers (Croatian Football Federation) Dinamo Zagreb (French Football Federation) Marseille (Danish Football Association) Copenhagen (Royal Belgian Football Association) Club Brugge (Scottish Football Association) Celtic (Football Association of the Czech Republic) Viktoria Plzeň (Israel Football Association) Maccabi Haifa

== Format ==
In each group, teams played against each other home-and-away in a round-robin format. The group winners advanced to the round of 16, while the eight runners-up advanced to the play-offs, where they would be joined by the eight second round winners from the Domestic Champions Path.

=== Tiebreakers ===
Teams were ranked according to points (3 points for a win, 1 point for a draw, 0 points for a loss). If two or more teams were tied on points, the following tiebreaking criteria were applied, in the order given, to determine the rankings (see Article 14 Group formation and match system – group stage, Regulations of the UEFA Youth League):

1. Points in head-to-head matches among the tied teams;
2. Goal difference in head-to-head matches among the tied teams;
3. Goals scored in head-to-head matches among the tied teams;
4. If more than two teams were tied, and after applying all head-to-head criteria above, a subset of teams are still tied, all head-to-head criteria above are reapplied exclusively to this subset of teams;
5. Goal difference in all group matches;
6. Goals scored in all group matches;
7. Away goals scored in all group matches;
8. Wins in all group matches;
9. Away wins in all group matches;
10. Disciplinary points (direct red card = 3 points; double yellow card = 3 points; single yellow card = 1 point);
11. Drawing of lots.

== Groups ==
Times are CET/CEST, (Note: CEST (UTC+2) for dates up to 30 October 2022 (matchdays 1–5), and CET (UTC+1) for dates thereafter (matchday 6).) as listed by UEFA (local times, if different, are in parentheses).

=== Group A ===
Pos	Team	Pld	W	D	L	GF	GA	GD	Pts	Qualification	LIV	AJX	RAN	NAP
1	(The Football Association) Liverpool	6	5	0	1	20	8	+12	15	Advance to round of 16	—	4–0	4–1	5–0
2	(Royal Dutch Football Association) Ajax	6	4	1	1	17	10	+7	13	Advance to play-offs	3–1	—	2–1	5–1
3	(Scottish Football Association) Rangers	6	2	0	4	13	20	−7	6		3–4	2–6	—	3–2
4	(Italian Football Federation) Napoli	6	0	1	5	7	19	−12	1		1–2	1–1	2–3	—

Source: UEFA
Rules for classification: Tiebreakers
7 September 2022
13:00

Ajax (Royal Dutch Football Association)	2–1	(Scottish Football Association) Rangers
Vink 12'; Idumbo-Muzambo 30'	Report	MacKinnon 37'

De Toekomst, Ouder-Amstel
Attendance: 891
Referee: Miloš Milanović (Serbia)
7 September 2022
14:00

Napoli (Italian Football Federation)	1–2	(The Football Association) Liverpool
Iaccarino 59' (pen.)	Report	Doak 28'; Cannonier 67'

Stadio Comunale Arena Giuseppe Piccolo, Cercola
Attendance: 750
Referee: Arda Kardeşler (Turkey)

13 September 2022
15:00 (14:00 UTC+1)

Liverpool (The Football Association)	4–0	(Royal Dutch Football Association) Ajax
Cannonier 9', 54', 75'; Koumas 90+1'	Report

Liverpool FC Academy Training Ground, Kirkby
Attendance: 227
Referee: Tomáš Klíma (Czech Republic)
14 September 2022 (Note: The Rangers v Napoli match, originally scheduled to be played on 13 September 2022, 15:00 (14:00 UTC+1), was rescheduled to the following day at the same time due to conditions related to the death of Elizabeth II.)
15:00 (14:00 UTC+1)

Rangers (Scottish Football Association)	3–2	(Italian Football Federation) Napoli
Strachan 10'; Lindsay 37'; Ure 70'	Report	Giannini 58'; Rossi 86'

Firhill Stadium, Glasgow
Attendance: 750
Referee: Kristoffer Hagenes (Norway)

4 October 2022
15:00

Ajax (Royal Dutch Football Association)	5–1	(Italian Football Federation) Napoli
Misehouy 8'; Jensen 13'; Idumbo-Muzambo 38', 78'; Banel 84' (pen.)	Report	Rossi 36' (pen.)

De Toekomst, Ouder-Amstel
Attendance: 712
Referee: Damian Sylwestrzak (Poland)
4 October 2022
15:00 (14:00 UTC+1)

Liverpool (The Football Association)	4–1	(Scottish Football Association) Rangers
Cannonier 23'; Doak 26'; Quansah 54'; Chambers 90+2'	Report	Young 90+4'

Liverpool FC Academy Training Ground, Kirkby
Attendance: 360
Referee: Balázs Berke (Hungary)

12 October 2022
14:00

Napoli (Italian Football Federation)	1–1	(Royal Dutch Football Association) Ajax
Rossi 29' (pen.)	Report	Hato 88'

Stadio Comunale Arena Giuseppe Piccolo, Cercola
Attendance: 539
Referee: Goga Kikacheishvili (Georgia)
12 October 2022
16:00 (15:00 UTC+1)

Rangers (Scottish Football Association)	3–4	(The Football Association) Liverpool
Lindsay 10' (pen.); Lyall 62'; Ure 72'	Report	Cannonier 8', 35'; Frauendorf 18'; Doak 80'

Firhill Stadium, Glasgow
Attendance: 785
Referee: Robert Ian Jenkins (Wales)

26 October 2022
14:00

Napoli (Italian Football Federation)	2–3	(Scottish Football Association) Rangers
Spavone 45+3', 45+6' (pen.)	Report	Ure 21'; Lovelace 23', 52' (pen.)

Stadio Comunale Arena Giuseppe Piccolo, Cercola
Attendance: 377
Referee: Jasmin Sabotic (Luxembourg)
26 October 2022
15:00

Ajax (Royal Dutch Football Association)	3–1	(The Football Association) Liverpool
Banel 14'; Misehouy 41'; Kalokoh 63'	Report	Kone-Doherty 44'

De Toekomst, Ouder-Amstel
Attendance: 1,713
Referee: Christian-Petru Ciochirca (Austria)

1 November 2022
15:00 (14:00 UTC+0)

Liverpool (The Football Association)	5–0	(Italian Football Federation) Napoli
Koumas 29'; Doak 51'; Chambers 56'; Kone-Doherty 63', 66'	Report

Liverpool FC Academy Training Ground, Kirkby
Attendance: 176
Referee: Tom Owen (Wales)
1 November 2022
15:00 (14:00 UTC+0)

Rangers (Scottish Football Association)	2–6	(Royal Dutch Football Association) Ajax
McCausland 30', 38'	Report	Kalokoh 8', 45+2'; Ciubotaru 56' (o.g.); Van Bohemen 62'; Chahid 72'; Boerhout 90+1'

Firhill Stadium, Glasgow
Attendance: 506
Referee: Jan Machálek (Czech Republic)

=== Group B ===
Pos	Team	Pld	W	D	L	GF	GA	GD	Pts	Qualification	ATM	POR	BRU	LEV
1	(Royal Spanish Football Federation) Atlético Madrid	6	5	0	1	14	4	+10	15	Advance to round of 16	—	1–0	1–2	4–0
2	(Portuguese Football Federation) Porto	6	4	0	2	11	7	+4	12	Advance to play-offs	1–2	—	2–1	3–1
3	(Royal Belgian Football Association) Club Brugge	6	3	0	3	10	9	+1	9		1–3	1–2	—	4–1
4	(German Football Association) Bayer Leverkusen	6	0	0	6	3	18	−15	0		0–3	1–3	0–1	—

Source: UEFA
Rules for classification: Tiebreakers
7 September 2022
16:00

Club Brugge (Royal Belgian Football Association)	4–1	(German Football Association) Bayer Leverkusen
Spileers 23'; Vermant 39'; Talbi 41'; Van Rafelghem 49'	Report	Sertdemir 19'

The NEST, Roeselare
Attendance: 890
Referee: Joey Kooij (Netherlands)
7 September 2022
16:00

Atlético Madrid (Royal Spanish Football Federation)	1–0	(Portuguese Football Federation) Porto
Niño 72'	Report

Centro Deportivo Wanda Alcalá de Henares, Alcalá de Henares
Attendance: 0
Referee: Damian Sylwestrzak (Poland)

13 September 2022
13:00 (12:00 UTC+1)

Porto (Portuguese Football Federation)	2–1	(Royal Belgian Football Association) Club Brugge
Meireles 8'; Fernandes 31' (pen.)	Report	De Roeve 25'

Estádio Municipal Jorge Sampaio, Vila Nova de Gaia
Attendance: 409
Referee: Nenad Minakovic (Serbia)
13 September 2022
14:00

Bayer Leverkusen (German Football Association)	0–3	(Royal Spanish Football Federation) Atlético Madrid
	Report	Niño 24'; Raihani 59'; Steur 90+1' (o.g.)

Ulrich-Haberland-Stadion, Leverkusen
Attendance: 500
Referee: Sander van der Eijk (Netherlands)

4 October 2022
13:00 (12:00 UTC+1)

Porto (Portuguese Football Federation)	3–1	(German Football Association) Bayer Leverkusen
Monteiro 51', 90+2'; Meireles 67'	Report	Sertdemir 59' (pen.)

Estádio Municipal Jorge Sampaio, Vila Nova de Gaia
Attendance: 407
Referee: Evangelos Manouchos (Greece)
4 October 2022
16:00

Club Brugge (Royal Belgian Football Association)	1–3	(Royal Spanish Football Federation) Atlético Madrid
Goemare 90'	Report	Niño 12'; Díez 49'; Gismera 60'

The NEST, Roeselare
Attendance: 510
Referee: Kristoffer Hagenes (Norway)

12 October 2022
14:00

Atlético Madrid (Royal Spanish Football Federation)	1–2	(Royal Belgian Football Association) Club Brugge
Niño 9' (pen.)	Report	Furo 59'; De Smet 63'

Centro Deportivo Wanda Alcalá de Henares, Alcalá de Henares
Attendance: 682
Referee: Anastasios Papapetrou (Greece)
12 October 2022
14:00

Bayer Leverkusen (German Football Association)	1–3	(Portuguese Football Federation) Porto
Eze 69'	Report	Candé 16'; Meireles 80'; Djaló 90+1'

Ulrich-Haberland-Stadion, Leverkusen
Attendance: 500
Referee: Snir Levy (Israel)

26 October 2022
13:30

Club Brugge (Royal Belgian Football Association)	1–2	(Portuguese Football Federation) Porto
Servais 83'	Report	Monteiro 3'; Candé 36'

The NEST, Roeselare
Attendance: 948
Referee: Luca Cibelli (Switzerland)
26 October 2022
16:00

Atlético Madrid (Royal Spanish Football Federation)	4–0	(German Football Association) Bayer Leverkusen
Raihani 17'; Niño 29', 46'; Esteban 83'	Report

Centro Deportivo Wanda Alcalá de Henares, Alcalá de Henares
Attendance: 450
Referee: David Smajc (Slovenia)

1 November 2022
13:00 (12:00 UTC+0)

Porto (Portuguese Football Federation)	1–2	(Royal Spanish Football Federation) Atlético Madrid
Andrade 47'	Report	Niño 12' (pen.); Raihani 48'

Estádio Municipal Jorge Sampaio, Vila Nova de Gaia
Attendance: 1,407
Referee: Andrei Chivulete (Romania)
2 November 2022
14:00

Bayer Leverkusen (German Football Association)	0–1	(Royal Belgian Football Association) Club Brugge
	Report	Servais 65' (pen.)

Ulrich-Haberland-Stadion, Leverkusen
Attendance: 260
Referee: Miloš Bošković (Montenegro)

=== Group C ===
Pos	Team	Pld	W	D	L	GF	GA	GD	Pts	Qualification	BAR	INT	BAY	PLZ
1	(Royal Spanish Football Federation) Barcelona	6	4	2	0	18	7	+11	14	Advance to round of 16	—	2–0	3–2	3–0
2	(Italian Football Federation) Inter Milan	6	2	1	3	10	14	−4	7	Advance to play-offs	1–6	—	2–2	4–2
3	(German Football Association) Bayern Munich	6	1	3	2	13	13	0	6		3–3	2–0	—	1–2
4	(Football Association of the Czech Republic) Viktoria Plzeň	6	1	2	3	8	15	−7	5		1–1	0–3	3–3	—

Source: UEFA
Rules for classification: Tiebreakers
7 September 2022
14:00

Barcelona (Royal Spanish Football Federation)	3–0	(Football Association of the Czech Republic) Viktoria Plzeň
Barberá 22'; Akhomach 51'; Alarcón 60'	Report

Johan Cruyff Stadium, Sant Joan Despí
Attendance: 692
Referee: Helgi Mikael Jónasson (Iceland)
7 September 2022
16:00

Inter Milan (Italian Football Federation)	2–2	(German Football Association) Bayern Munich
Carboni 65'; Curatolo 82'	Report	Ibrahimović 19'; Kabadayi 35'

Stadio Ernesto Breda, Sesto San Giovanni
Attendance: 381
Referee: Luka Bilbija (Bosnia and Herzegovina)

13 September 2022
13:00

Viktoria Plzeň (Football Association of the Czech Republic)	0–3	(Italian Football Federation) Inter Milan
	Report	Pelamatti 28', 32'; Carboni 30'

Stadion TJ Přeštice, Přeštice
Attendance: 900
Referee: Adam Ladebäck (Sweden)
13 September 2022
14:00

Bayern Munich (German Football Association)	3–3	(Royal Spanish Football Federation) Barcelona
Wanner 6'; Herold 25'; Copado 85'	Report	Barberá 33', 39', 49'

FC Bayern Campus, Munich
Attendance: 1,000
Referee: Christian-Petru Ciochirca (Austria)

4 October 2022
13:00

Bayern Munich (German Football Association)	1–2	(Football Association of the Czech Republic) Viktoria Plzeň
Scholze 69'	Report	Krůta 87'; Paluska 90+1'

FC Bayern Campus, Munich
Attendance: 450
Referee: Sayat Karabayev (Kazakhstan)
4 October 2022
16:00

Inter Milan (Italian Football Federation)	1–6	(Royal Spanish Football Federation) Barcelona
Fontanarosa 86' (pen.)	Report	Riad 5'; Fernández 20'; Barberá 45+2' (pen.), 68'; Hernández 78'; Guiu Paz 81'

Stadio Ernesto Breda, Sesto San Giovanni
Attendance: 350
Referee: Sander van der Eijk (Netherlands)

12 October 2022
13:00

Viktoria Plzeň (Football Association of the Czech Republic)	3–3	(German Football Association) Bayern Munich
Krůta 12'; Vacek 60'; Paluska 72'	Report	Copado 33'; Ibrahimović 41' (pen.); Ranos 76'

Stadion TJ Přeštice, Přeštice
Attendance: 800
Referee: Genc Nuza (Kosovo)
12 October 2022
14:00

Barcelona (Royal Spanish Football Federation)	2–0	(Italian Football Federation) Inter Milan
Barberá 8'; Hernández 90+3'	Report

Johan Cruyff Stadium, Sant Joan Despí
Attendance: 1,445
Referee: Mohammad Al-Emara (Finland)

26 October 2022
14:00

Inter Milan (Italian Football Federation)	4–2	(Football Association of the Czech Republic) Viktoria Plzeň
Iliev 23', 34', 65', 77'	Report	Fontanarosa 54' (o.g.); Dabani 85'

Stadio Ernesto Breda, Sesto San Giovanni
Attendance: 291
Referee: Sandi Putros (Denmark)
26 October 2022
14:00

Barcelona (Royal Spanish Football Federation)	3–2	(German Football Association) Bayern Munich
Alarcón 16', 39'; Garrido 87'	Report	Copado 10'; Ibrahimović 90+5'

Johan Cruyff Stadium, Sant Joan Despí
Attendance: 873
Referee: Gergo Bogár (Hungary)

1 November 2022
13:00

Viktoria Plzeň (Football Association of the Czech Republic)	1–1	(Royal Spanish Football Federation) Barcelona
Deml 11'	Report	Rodríguez 5'

Stadion TJ Přeštice, Přeštice
Attendance: 800
Referee: Visar Kastrati (Kosovo)
1 November 2022
16:00

Bayern Munich (German Football Association)	2–0	(Italian Football Federation) Inter Milan
Hepburn 3'; Qashi 79'	Report

FC Bayern Campus, Munich
Attendance: 1,100
Referee: Damian Sylwestrzak (Poland)

=== Group D ===
Pos	Team	Pld	W	D	L	GF	GA	GD	Pts	Qualification	SPO	FRA	TOT	MAR
1	(Portuguese Football Federation) Sporting CP	6	4	2	0	13	3	+10	14	Advance to round of 16	—	1–0	2–0	1–1
2	(German Football Association) Eintracht Frankfurt	6	3	2	1	9	6	+3	11	Advance to play-offs	1–1	—	1–0	2–0
3	(The Football Association) Tottenham Hotspur	6	2	0	4	9	10	−1	6		1–2	2–3	—	3–0
4	(French Football Federation) Marseille	6	0	2	4	6	18	−12	2		0–6	2–2	2–3	—

Source: UEFA
Rules for classification: Tiebreakers
7 September 2022
12:00

Eintracht Frankfurt (German Football Association)	1–1	(Portuguese Football Federation) Sporting CP
Schäfer 62'	Report	Ribeiro 10'

Sportpark Dreieich, Dreieich
Attendance: 1,100
Referee: Ashot Ghaltakhchyan (Armenia)
7 September 2022
15:00 (14:00 UTC+1)

Tottenham Hotspur (The Football Association)	3–0	(French Football Federation) Marseille
Donley 16' (pen.); Williams 32', 49'	Report

Tottenham Training Centre, Enfield
Attendance: 215
Referee: Jakob Alexander Sundberg (Denmark)

13 September 2022
12:00 (11:00 UTC+1)

Sporting CP (Portuguese Football Federation)	2–0	(The Football Association) Tottenham Hotspur
Mateus 43'; Ribeiro 58'	Report

Stadium Aurélio Pereira, Alcochete
Attendance: 645
Referee: Luca Pairetto (Italy)
13 September 2022
15:00

Marseille (French Football Federation)	2–2	(German Football Association) Eintracht Frankfurt
Said M'Madi 21'; Van Neck 90+7'	Report	Wenig 9'; Bobson 60'

Stade OM Campus - Roger Scotti, Marseille
Attendance: 423
Referee: César Soto Grado (Spain)

4 October 2022
14:00

Marseille (French Football Federation)	0–6	(Portuguese Football Federation) Sporting CP
	Report	Moreira 26', 59'; Justo 40'; Mateus 41'; Ribeiro 49', 52'

Stade OM Campus - Roger Scotti, Marseille
Attendance: 150
Referee: Kaspar Sjöberg (Sweden)
4 October 2022
14:00

Eintracht Frankfurt (German Football Association)	1–0	(The Football Association) Tottenham Hotspur
Ferri Julia 25'	Report

Sportpark Dreieich, Dreieich
Attendance: 1,051
Referee: Miloš Gigovic (Bosnia and Herzegovina)

12 October 2022
15:00 (14:00 UTC+1)

Tottenham Hotspur (The Football Association)	2–3	(German Football Association) Eintracht Frankfurt
Devine 10', 38'	Report	Bobson 46'; Alaoui 49'; Hannak 53'

Tottenham Training Centre, Enfield
Attendance: 193
Referee: Vitor Ferreira (Portugal)
12 October 2022
16:00 (15:00 UTC+1)

Sporting CP (Portuguese Football Federation)	1–1	(French Football Federation) Marseille
Batista 51'	Report	Dessus 66'

Stadium Aurélio Pereira, Alcochete
Attendance: 368
Referee: Christopher Jäger (Austria)

26 October 2022
14:00

Eintracht Frankfurt (German Football Association)	2–0	(French Football Federation) Marseille
Loune 5'; Awusi Boddien 83'	Report

Sportpark Dreieich, Dreieich
Attendance: 350
Referee: Michal Ocenáš (Slovakia)
26 October 2022
15:00 (14:00 UTC+1)

Tottenham Hotspur (The Football Association)	1–2	(Portuguese Football Federation) Sporting CP
Lankshear 1'	Report	Cruz 19', 65'

Tottenham Training Centre, Enfield
Attendance: 247
Referee: Vitālijs Spasjoņņikovs (Latvia)

1 November 2022
15:00

Marseille (French Football Federation)	2–3	(The Football Association) Tottenham Hotspur
Benyahia Tani 13'; Lafont 90'	Report	Mundle 2'; Devine 32'; Ajayi 66'

Stade OM Campus - Roger Scotti, Marseille
Attendance: 500
Referee: Sayat Karabayev (Kazakhstan)
1 November 2022
16:00 (15:00 UTC+0)

Sporting CP (Portuguese Football Federation)	1–0	(German Football Association) Eintracht Frankfurt
Cabral 10'	Report

Stadium Aurélio Pereira, Alcochete
Attendance: 687
Referee: Pavel Orel (Czech Republic)

=== Group E ===
Pos	Team	Pld	W	D	L	GF	GA	GD	Pts	Qualification	MIL	SAL	DZG	CHE
1	(Italian Football Federation) Milan	6	4	2	0	12	5	+7	14	Advance to round of 16	—	2–1	3–0	3–1
2	(Austrian Football Association) FC Salzburg	6	2	2	2	11	7	+4	8	Advance to play-offs	1–1	—	2–0	5–1
3	(Croatian Football Federation) Dinamo Zagreb	6	2	0	4	7	14	−7	6		1–2	2–1	—	4–2
4	(The Football Association) Chelsea	6	1	2	3	10	14	−4	5		1–1	1–1	4–0	—

Source: UEFA
Rules for classification: Tiebreakers
6 September 2022
13:30

Dinamo Zagreb (Croatian Football Federation)	4–2	(The Football Association) Chelsea
Gubijan 6'; Rukavina 20'; Krdžalić 34'; Topić 48'	Report	Castledine 29', 82'

Stadion Kranjčevićeva, Zagreb
Attendance: 736
Referee: Amine Kourgheli (Belarus)
6 September 2022
15:00

FC Salzburg (Austrian Football Association)	1–1	(Italian Football Federation) Milan
Konaté 66'	Report	Coubiṣ 10' (pen.)

Untersberg-Arena, Grödig
Attendance: 654
Referee: Daniel Schlager (Germany)

14 September 2022
14:00 (13:00 UTC+1)

Chelsea (The Football Association)	1–1	(Austrian Football Association) FC Salzburg
Hall 60'	Report	Crescenti 83'

Chelsea Football Club Training Ground, Stoke d'Abernon
Attendance: 209
Referee: Jamie Robinson (Northern Ireland)
14 September 2022
14:30

Milan (Italian Football Federation)	3–0	(Croatian Football Federation) Dinamo Zagreb
El Hilali 26'; Traorè 45'; Lazetić 90+3'	Report

Centro Sportivo Vismara, Milan
Attendance: 356
Referee: Evangelos Manouchos (Greece)

5 October 2022
14:30

FC Salzburg (Austrian Football Association)	2–0	(Croatian Football Federation) Dinamo Zagreb
Konaté 71'; Sahin 90'	Report

Untersberg-Arena, Grödig
Attendance: 656
Referee: Tomáš Klíma (Czech Republic)
5 October 2022
16:00 (15:00 UTC+1)

Chelsea (The Football Association)	1–1	(Italian Football Federation) Milan
Castledine 65'	Report	Simić 10'

Chelsea Football Club Training Ground, Stoke d'Abernon
Attendance: 205
Referee: Cesar Soto Grado (Spain)

11 October 2022
14:00

Dinamo Zagreb (Croatian Football Federation)	2–1	(Austrian Football Association) FC Salzburg
Katinić 66'; Topić 67'	Report	Havel 19'

Stadion Kranjčevićeva, Zagreb
Attendance: 534
Referee: Jakob Alexander Sundberg (Denmark)
11 October 2022
14:30

Milan (Italian Football Federation)	3–1	(The Football Association) Chelsea
Alesi 63', 90'; Longhi 87'	Report	Webster 84' (pen.)

Centro Sportivo Vismara, Milan
Attendance: 499
Referee: Bram Van Driessche (Belgium)

25 October 2022
14:00

Dinamo Zagreb (Croatian Football Federation)	1–2	(Italian Football Federation) Milan
Šakota 29'	Report	Longhi 25'; Alesi 77' (pen.)

Stadion Kranjčevićeva, Zagreb
Attendance: 724
Referee: Nathan Verboomen (Belgium)
25 October 2022
14:30

FC Salzburg (Austrian Football Association)	5–1	(The Football Association) Chelsea
Crescenti 13'; Konaté 33' (pen.), 39', 71'; Lechner 90+1'	Report	Mothersille 16'

Untersberg-Arena, Grödig
Attendance: 718
Referee: Miloš Milanović (Serbia)

2 November 2022
14:00 (13:00 UTC+1)

Chelsea (The Football Association)	4–0	(Croatian Football Federation) Dinamo Zagreb
Castledine 40'; Flower 64'; Cvetko 71' (o.g.); Runham 85'	Report

Chelsea Football Club Training Ground, Stoke d'Abernon
Attendance: 203
Referee: Iwan Arwel Griffith (Wales)
2 November 2022
14:30

Milan (Italian Football Federation)	2–1	(Austrian Football Association) FC Salzburg
Lazetić 50'; Alesi 52'	Report	Zeteny 48'

Centro Sportivo Vismara, Milan
Attendance: 533
Referee: Igor Pajac (Croatia)

=== Group F ===
Pos	Team	Pld	W	D	L	GF	GA	GD	Pts	Qualification	RMA	SHK	RBL	CEL
1	(Royal Spanish Football Federation) Real Madrid	6	5	1	0	23	5	+18	16	Advance to round of 16	—	6–1	1–1	4–1
2	(Ukrainian Association of Football) Shakhtar Donetsk	6	3	1	2	6	10	−4	10	Advance to play-offs	0–3	—	0–0	2–1
3	(German Football Association) RB Leipzig	6	1	2	3	6	8	−2	5		2–3	0–2	—	1–2
4	(Scottish Football Association) Celtic	6	1	0	5	4	16	−12	3		0–6	0–1	0–2	—

Source: UEFA
Rules for classification: Tiebreakers
6 September 2022
15:30

RB Leipzig (German Football Association)	0–2	(Ukrainian Association of Football) Shakhtar Donetsk
	Report	Buleza 16'; Siheyev 78'

Stadion am Cottaweg, Leipzig
Attendance: 583
Referee: Sandi Putros (Denmark)
6 September 2022
16:00 (15:00 UTC+1)

Celtic (Scottish Football Association)	0–6	(Royal Spanish Football Federation) Real Madrid
	Report	Fortuny 7'; Youssef 19'; Herrero 30'; Paz 32', 50'; Palacios 68'

Excelsior Stadium, Airdrie
Attendance: 524
Referee: Tom Owen (Wales)

14 September 2022
12:00

Shakhtar Donetsk (Ukrainian Association of Football)	2–1	(Scottish Football Association) Celtic
Yushchenko 25'; Corr 55' (o.g.)	Report	Brooks 75'

Legia Training Center, Książenice, Poland (Note: Due to the Russian invasion of Ukraine, Ukrainian teams were required to play their home matches at neutral venues until further notice. Therefore, Shakhtar Donetsk play at Legia Training Center, Książenice, Poland, instead of their regular stadium, Donbas Arena in Donetsk.)
Attendance: 0
Referee: Jan Machálek (Czech Republic)
14 September 2022
16:00

Real Madrid (Royal Spanish Football Federation)	1–1	(German Football Association) RB Leipzig
Palacios 46'	Report	Köhl 89'

Alfredo Di Stéfano Stadium, Madrid
Attendance: 810
Referee: Gustavo Correia (Portugal)

5 October 2022
13:00

RB Leipzig (German Football Association)	1–2	(Scottish Football Association) Celtic
Voigt 58'	Report	Vata 1'; Letsosa 10'

Stadion am Cottaweg, Leipzig
Attendance: 352
Referee: Walter Altmann (Austria)
5 October 2022
14:00

Real Madrid (Royal Spanish Football Federation)	6–1	(Ukrainian Association of Football) Shakhtar Donetsk
Bravo 30'; Gonzalo 34', 48'; Fortuny 45'; Palacios 54', 73'	Report	Ramón 42' (o.g.)

Alfredo Di Stéfano Stadium, Madrid
Attendance: 409
Referee: Eldorjan Hamiti (Albania)

11 October 2022
12:00

Shakhtar Donetsk (Ukrainian Association of Football)	0–3	(Royal Spanish Football Federation) Real Madrid
	Report	Palacios 22'; Jiménez 55'; Guerrero 86'

Legia Training Center, Książenice, Poland
Attendance: 384
Referee: Igor Stojchevski (North Macedonia)
11 October 2022
15:00 (14:00 UTC+1)

Celtic (Scottish Football Association)	0–2	(German Football Association) RB Leipzig
	Report	Schierack 11'; Köhl 16'

Excelsior Stadium, Airdrie
Attendance: 310
Referee: Nathan Verboomen (Belgium)

25 October 2022
14:00

RB Leipzig (German Football Association)	2–3	(Royal Spanish Football Federation) Real Madrid
Atom 26'; Weber 60' (pen.)	Report	Paz 34', 38'; Ramón 56'

Stadion am Cottaweg, Leipzig
Attendance: 723
Referee: Matthew De Gabriele (Malta)
25 October 2022
15:00 (14:00 UTC+1)

Celtic (Scottish Football Association)	0–1	(Ukrainian Association of Football) Shakhtar Donetsk
	Report	Pohorilyi 63'

Excelsior Stadium, Airdrie
Attendance: 311
Referee: Jamie Robinson (Northern Ireland)

2 November 2022
12:00

Shakhtar Donetsk (Ukrainian Association of Football)	0–0	(German Football Association) RB Leipzig
	Report

Legia Training Center, Książenice, Poland
Attendance: 363
Referee: Luka Bilbija (Bosnia and Herzegovina)
2 November 2022
13:00

Real Madrid (Royal Spanish Football Federation)	4–1	(Scottish Football Association) Celtic
Bravo 1'; Lancha 8'; Fortuny 29'; Paz 77'	Report	Brooks 16'

Alfredo Di Stéfano Stadium, Madrid
Attendance: 420
Referee: Daniyar Sakhi (Kazakhstan)

=== Group G ===
Pos	Team	Pld	W	D	L	GF	GA	GD	Pts	Qualification	MCI	DOR	CPH	SEV
1	(The Football Association) Manchester City	6	4	2	0	16	8	+8	14	Advance to round of 16	—	3–2	1–1	1–0
2	(German Football Association) Borussia Dortmund	6	2	2	2	9	9	0	8	Advance to play-offs	3–3	—	0–2	2–0
3	(Danish Football Association) Copenhagen	6	2	1	3	9	8	+1	7		1–3	0–1	—	4–1
4	(Royal Spanish Football Federation) Sevilla	6	1	1	4	5	14	−9	4		1–5	1–1	2–1	—

Source: UEFA
Rules for classification: Tiebreakers
6 September 2022
11:30

Sevilla (Royal Spanish Football Federation)	1–5	(The Football Association) Manchester City
Hormigo 14'	Report	Borges 44', 88', 90+6'; Mebude 53'; Dickson 75'

Estadio Jesús Navas, Seville
Attendance: 632
Referee: Joonas Jaanovits (Estonia)
6 September 2022
14:00

Borussia Dortmund (German Football Association)	0–2	(Danish Football Association) Copenhagen
	Report	Óskarsson 78'; Schlichting 83'

Dortmund Brackel Training Ground, Dortmund
Attendance: 570
Referee: Sayat Karabayev (Kazakhstan)

14 September 2022
16:00 (15:00 UTC+1)

Manchester City (The Football Association)	3–2	(German Football Association) Borussia Dortmund
O'Reilly 33'; Bobb 90' (pen.); Ndala 90+2'	Report	Walz 72'; Rijkhoff 81' (pen.)

Academy Stadium, Manchester
Attendance: 360
Referee: Rob Hennessy (Republic of Ireland)
14 September 2022
16:00

Copenhagen (Danish Football Association)	4–1	(Royal Spanish Football Federation) Sevilla
Sahsah 29', 55' (pen.); Schlichting 50'; Lund 62'	Report	Benavides 45'

Østerbro Stadium, Copenhagen
Attendance: 650
Referee: Mohammad Al-Emara (Finland)

5 October 2022
16:00 (15:00 UTC+1)

Manchester City (The Football Association)	1–1	(Danish Football Association) Copenhagen
Ndala 90+2'	Report	Sahsah 55'

Academy Stadium, Manchester
Attendance: 362
Referee: Jasmin Sabotic (Luxembourg)
5 October 2022
16:00

Sevilla (Royal Spanish Football Federation)	1–1	(German Football Association) Borussia Dortmund
Ortín 66'	Report	Brunner 70'

Estadio Jesús Navas, Seville
Attendance: 321
Referee: Miloš Bošković (Montenegro)

11 October 2022
14:00

Copenhagen (Danish Football Association)	1–3	(The Football Association) Manchester City
Sahsah 58'	Report	Dickson 31'; Mebude 54' (pen.); Borges 81'

Østerbro Stadium, Copenhagen
Attendance: 1,352
Referee: Kaarlo Oskari Hämäläinen (Finland)
11 October 2022
16:00

Borussia Dortmund (German Football Association)	2–0	(Royal Spanish Football Federation) Sevilla
Rijkhoff 26', 88'	Report

Dortmund Brackel Training Ground, Dortmund
Attendance: 678
Referee: Luca Pairetto (Italy)

25 October 2022
14:00

Sevilla (Royal Spanish Football Federation)	2–1	(Danish Football Association) Copenhagen
Hormigo 48'; Fernández 59'	Report	Simmelhack 72' (pen.)

Estadio Jesús Navas, Seville
Attendance: 168
Referee: Vitor Ferreira (Portugal)
25 October 2022
16:00

Borussia Dortmund (German Football Association)	3–3	(The Football Association) Manchester City
Brunner 2'; Gürpüz 47', 62'	Report	Dickson 24'; O'Reilly 40'; Mebude 43'

Dortmund Brackel Training Ground, Dortmund
Attendance: 790
Referee: Ondřej Berka (Czech Republic)

2 November 2022
14:00 (13:00 UTC+0)

Manchester City (The Football Association)	1–0	(Royal Spanish Football Federation) Sevilla
Díaz 45+2' (o.g.)	Report

Academy Stadium, Manchester
Attendance: 307
Referee: Martin Dohal (Slovakia)
2 November 2022
16:00

Copenhagen (Danish Football Association)	0–1	(German Football Association) Borussia Dortmund
	Report	Brunner 87'

Østerbro Stadium, Copenhagen
Attendance: 302
Referee: Balázs Berke (Hungary)

=== Group H ===
Pos	Team	Pld	W	D	L	GF	GA	GD	Pts	Qualification	PAR	JUV	BEN	MHA
1	(French Football Federation) Paris Saint-Germain	6	4	1	1	20	11	+9	13	Advance to round of 16	—	5–3	2–3	3–1
2	(Italian Football Federation) Juventus	6	3	2	1	17	14	+3	11	Advance to play-offs	4–4	—	1–1	3–1
3	(Portuguese Football Federation) Benfica	6	2	1	3	12	10	+2	7		0–1	2–3	—	0–1
4	(Israel Football Association) Maccabi Haifa	6	1	0	5	6	20	−14	3		0–5	1–3	2–6	—

Source: UEFA
Rules for classification: Tiebreakers
6 September 2022
14:00

Paris Saint-Germain (French Football Federation)	5–3	(Italian Football Federation) Juventus
Housni 3', 36'; Zaïre-Emery 7'; Gharbi 44'; Lemina 45+2'	Report	Mbangula 17'; Hasa 77'; Huijsen 79' (pen.)

Stade Municipal Georges Lefèvre, Saint-Germain-en-Laye
Attendance: 896
Referee: Sven Jablonski (Germany)
6 September 2022
16:00 (15:00 UTC+1)

Benfica (Portuguese Football Federation)	0–1	(Israel Football Association) Maccabi Haifa
	Report	Razon 14'

Futebol Campus, Seixal
Attendance: 619
Referee: Elchin Masiyev (Azerbaijan)

14 September 2022
14:00

Juventus (Italian Football Federation)	1–1	(Portuguese Football Federation) Benfica
Mbangula 90+3'	Report	Semedo 62'

Juventus Training Center, Turin
Attendance: 428
Referee: Kaspar Sjöberg (Sweden)
14 September 2022
14:00 (15:00 UTC+3)

Maccabi Haifa (Israel Football Association)	0–5	(French Football Federation) Paris Saint-Germain
	Report	Housni 65'; Gharbi 15', 50' (pen.); Lemina 14', 60'

Netanya Stadium, Netanya
Attendance: 440
Referee: Chrysovalantis Theouli (Cyprus)

4 October 2022
14:00

Juventus (Italian Football Federation)	3–1	(Israel Football Association) Maccabi Haifa
Yıldız 46'; Hasa 72'; Anghelè 79'	Report	Shibli 53'

Juventus Training Center, Turin
Attendance: 362
Referee: Christian-Petru Ciochirca (Austria)
5 October 2022
16:00 (15:00 UTC+1)

Benfica (Portuguese Football Federation)	0–1	(French Football Federation) Paris Saint-Germain
	Report	Housni 80'

Futebol Campus, Seixal
Attendance: 1,376
Referee: Henrik Nalbandyan (Armenia)

11 October 2022
13:00 (14:00 UTC+3)

Maccabi Haifa (Israel Football Association)	1–3	(Italian Football Federation) Juventus
Distelfeld 5'	Report	Anghelè 49'; Mancini 90+2'; Huijsen 90+6' (pen.)

Netanya Stadium, Netanya
Attendance: 370
Referee: Matthew De Gabriele (Malta)
11 October 2022
14:00

Paris Saint-Germain (French Football Federation)	2–3	(Portuguese Football Federation) Benfica
Housni 3', 86'	Report	Semedo 14', 45+1' (pen.); Moreira 39'

Stade Municipal Georges Lefèvre, Saint-Germain-en-Laye
Attendance: 827
Referee: Darren England (England)

25 October 2022
15:00

Paris Saint-Germain (French Football Federation)	3–1	(Israel Football Association) Maccabi Haifa
Zague 12'; Gharbi 52'; Mukelenge 64'	Report	Razon 78'

Stade Municipal Georges Lefèvre, Saint-Germain-en-Laye
Attendance: 806
Referee: Kaspar Sjöberg (Sweden)
25 October 2022
16:00 (15:00 UTC+1)

Benfica (Portuguese Football Federation)	2–3	(Italian Football Federation) Juventus
Hugo Félix 28', 31'	Report	Mbangula 48'; Hasa 63' (pen.), 79'

Futebol Campus, Seixal
Attendance: 916
Referee: Genc Nuza (Kosovo)

2 November 2022
15:00 (16:00 UTC+2)

Maccabi Haifa (Israel Football Association)	2–6	(Portuguese Football Federation) Benfica
Kahvić 84', 88' (pen.)	Report	Dju 22', 31'; Hugo Félix 48'; Lima 62'; Rego 65'; Eissat 69' (o.g.)

Netanya Stadium, Netanya
Attendance: 265
Referee: Bulat Sariyev (Kazakhstan)
2 November 2022
16:00

Juventus (Italian Football Federation)	4–4	(French Football Federation) Paris Saint-Germain
Yıldız 50', 90'; Huijsen 90+4'; Anghelè 90+5'	Report	Gharbi 6', 84'; Housni 19', 57'

Juventus Training Center, Turin
Attendance: 420
Referee: Joey Kooij (Netherlands)
