= 2022–23 in Croatian football =

Football in Croatia
- Season: 2022–23

Men's football
- HNL: Dinamo Zagreb
- Prva HNL: Rudeš
- Druga HNL: Sesvete
- Croatian Cup: Hajduk Split

Women's football
- Prva HNLŽ: Osijek
- Druga HNLŽ: Gorica (Group A); Međimurje-Čakovec (Group B)
- Croatian Cup: Split

The following article presents a summary of the 2022–23 football season in Croatia, which is the 32nd season of competitive football in the country.

== National teams ==
=== Croatia ===
Date	Venue	Opponents	Score	Croatia scorer(s)	Report
2022–23 UEFA Nations League – Group stage
22 September 2022	Stadion Maksimir, Zagreb	Denmark	2–1	Sosa, Majer	UEFA.com
25 September 2022	Ernst-Happel-Stadion, Vienna	Austria	3–1	Modrić, Livaja, Lovren	UEFA.com
Friendly fixtures
16 November 2022	Prince Faisal bin Fahd Stadium, Riyadh	Saudi Arabia	1–0	Kramarić	
2022 FIFA World Cup – Group stage
23 November 2022	Al Bayt Stadium, Al Khor	Morocco	0–0		FIFA.com
27 November 2022	Khalifa International Stadium, Al Rayyan	Canada	4–1	Kramarić (2), Livaja, Majer	FIFA.com
1 December 2022	Ahmad bin Ali Stadium, Al Rayyan	Belgium	0–0		FIFA.com
2022 FIFA World Cup – Knockout stage
5 December 2022	Al Janoub Stadium, Al Wakrah	Japan	1–1 (a.e.t.); 3–1 (p)	Perišić	FIFA.com
9 December 2022	Education City Stadium, Al Rayyan	Brazil	1–1 (a.e.t.) 4–2 (p)	Petković	FIFA.com
13 December 2022	Lusail Iconic Stadium, Lusail	Argentina	0–3		FIFA.com
17 December 2022	Khalifa International Stadium, Al Rayyan	Morocco	2–1	Gvardiol, Oršić	FIFA.com
UEFA Euro 2024 qualifying – Group stage
25 March 2023	Stadion Poljud, Split	Wales	1–1	Kramarić	UEFA.com
28 March 2023	Bursa Metropolitan Stadium, Bursa	Turkey	2–0	Kovačić (2)	UEFA.com
2023 UEFA Nations League Finals
14 June 2023	De Kuip, Rotterdam	Netherlands	4–2 (a.e.t.)	Kramarić, Pašalić, Petković, Modrić	UEFA.com
18 June 2023	De Kuip, Rotterdam	Spain	0–0 (a.e.t.); 4–5 (p)		UEFA.com

=== Croatia U21 ===
Date	Venue	Opponents	Score	Croatia scorer(s)	Report
2023 UEFA European Under-21 Championship qualification – Play-offs
23 September 2022	Stadion Aldo Drosina, Pula	Denmark	2–1	Vidović, Beljo	UEFA.com
27 September 2022	Vejle Stadium, Vejle	Denmark	1–2; 5–4 (p)	Matanović	UEFA.com
Friendly fixtures
17 November 2022	Stadion Aldo Drosina, Pula	Poland	3–1	Biuk (2), Ljubičić	hns-cff.hr
21 November 2022	Stadion Aldo Drosina, Pula	Austria	1–1	Jureškin	hns-cff.hr
23 March 2023	Stadion Varteks, Varaždin	Israel	0–0		hns-cff.hr
28 March 2023	Craven Cottage, London	England	2–1	Baturina, Beljo	

=== Croatia U19 ===
Date	Venue	Opponents	Score	Croatia scorer(s)	Report
2023 UEFA European Under-19 Championship qualification - Qualifying round
16 November 2022	ŠRC Rudeš, Zagreb	Faroe Islands	6–0	Rukavina, Brajković (3), Johannesen (o.g.), Brkljača	UEFA.com
19 November 2022	ŠRC Rudeš, Zagreb	Finland	1–2	Prpić	UEFA.com
22 November 2022	ŠRC Rudeš, Zagreb	Israel	3–0	Zvonarek (2), Brajković	UEFA.com
2023 UEFA European Under-19 Championship qualification - Elite round
22 March 2023	Sports Center CF Fão, Fão	Czech Republic	1–3	Matić	UEFA.com
25 March 2023	Estádio do FC Vizela, Vizela	Sweden	1–1	Antunović	UEFA.com
28 March 2023	Estádio Cidade de Barcelos, Barcelos	Portugal	0–3		UEFA.com

=== Croatia U17 ===
Date	Venue	Opponents	Score	Croatia scorer(s)	Report
2023 UEFA European Under-17 Championship qualification - Qualifying round
20 October 2022	Stadion Veli Jože, Poreč	Wales	0–2		UEFA.com
23 October 2022	Stadion Veli Jože, Poreč	Albania	1–0	Živković	UEFA.com
26 October 2022	Stadion Veli Jože, Poreč	Sweden	2–2	Vušković, Rimac	UEFA.com
2023 UEFA European Under-17 Championship qualification - Elite round
22 March 2023	Sarpsborg Stadion, Sarpsborg	Norway	0–0		UEFA.com
25 March 2023	Fredrikstad Stadion, Fredrikstad	Belgium	1–0	Kujundžić	UEFA.com
28 March 2023	Fredrikstad Stadion, Fredrikstad	Slovenia	2–1	Zebić, Rimac	UEFA.com
2023 UEFA European Under-17 Championship - Group stage
18 May 2023	Városi Sportpálya, Balmazújváros	England	0–1		UEFA.com
21 May 2023	Nagyerdei Stadion, Debrecen	Switzerland	1–2	Levak	UEFA.com
24 May 2023	Városi Sportpálya, Balmazújváros	Netherlands	1–1	Puljić	UEFA.com

=== Croatia Women's ===
Date	Venue	Opponents	Score	Croatia scorer(s)	Report
2023 FIFA Women's World Cup qualification - Group stage
2 September 2022	Stadion Branko Čavlović-Čavlek, Karlovac	Switzerland	0–2		UEFA.com
6 September 2022	LFF Stadium, Vilnius	Lithuania	1–0	Lažeta	UEFA.com
2023 Cyprus Women's Cup
16 February 2023	GSZ Stadium, Larnaca	Finland	1–4	Nevrkla	
19 February 2023	AEK Arena, Larnaca	Romania	2–0	Nevrkla, Rudelić	
22 February 2023	AEK Arena, Larnaca	Hungary	1–0	Rudelić	
Friendly fixtures
10 November 2022	Dalga Arena, Baku	Azerbaijan	0–0		hns-cff.hr
13 November 2022	Dalga Arena, Baku	Azerbaijan	2–1	Pranješ, Kunštek	hns-cff.hr
7 April 2023	Georgios Kamaras Stadium, Athens	Greece	1–1	Rudelić	hns-cff.hr
10 April 2023	Georgios Kamaras Stadium, Athens	Greece	1–2	Gegollaj	hns-cff.hr

=== Croatia Women's U19 ===
Date	Venue	Opponents	Score	Croatia scorer(s)	Report
2023 UEFA Women's Under-19 Championship qualification - Round 1
4 October 2022	Stadion Aldo Drosina, Pula	Cyprus	1–0	Ivandić	UEFA.com
7 October 2022	Stadion Aldo Drosina, Pula	Montenegro	5–0	Blažević, Živković, Iljkić, Mikulica, Šaban	UEFA.com
10 October 2022	Stadion Aldo Drosina, Pula	Azerbaijan	1–0	Mikulica	UEFA.com
2023 UEFA Women's Under-19 Championship qualification - Round 2
5 April 2023	Jessheim Stadium, Jessheim	Norway	1–2	Vračević	UEFA.com
8 April 2023	Jessheim Stadium, Jessheim	Germany	0–10		UEFA.com
11 April 2023	Gjemselund, Kongsvinger	Republic of Ireland	1–4	Iljkić	UEFA.com

=== Croatia Women's U17 ===
Date	Venue	Opponents	Score	Croatia scorer(s)	Report
2023 UEFA Women's Under-17 Championship qualification - Round 1
9 November 2022	Albena 1 Stadium, Albena	Bulgaria	5–0	Veseli, Vračević, Petković, Lovrić, Vunić	UEFA.com
12 November 2022	Albena 1 Stadium, Albena	Faroe Islands	1–0	Lovrić	UEFA.com
2023 UEFA Women's Under-17 Championship qualification - Round 2
12 March 2023	Gradski stadion, Sinj	England	0–4		UEFA.com
15 March 2023	Gradski stadion, Hrvace	Norway	0–2		UEFA.com
18 March 2023	Gradski stadion, Sinj	Belgium	2–2	Petković, Gavrić	UEFA.com

== League tables ==
=== Croatian Football League ===
Pos	Team	Pld	W	D	L	GF	GA	GD	Pts	Qualification or relegation
1	Dinamo Zagreb (C)	36	24	9	3	81	28	+53	81	Qualification for the Champions League second qualifying round
2	Hajduk Split	36	21	8	7	65	41	+24	71	Qualification to Europa Conference League third qualifying round (Note: Hajduk qualified for the Europa Conference League third qualifying round by winning the 2022–23 Croatian Football Cup.)
3	Osijek	36	13	11	12	46	41	+5	50	Qualification to Europa Conference League second qualifying round
4	Rijeka	36	14	7	15	44	44	0	49	Qualification to Europa Conference League second qualifying round
5	Istra 1961	36	11	13	12	36	38	−2	46	
6	Varaždin	36	12	10	14	41	51	−10	46	
7	Lokomotiva	36	11	10	15	45	50	−5	43	
8	Slaven Belupo	36	10	13	13	27	46	−19	43	
9	Gorica	36	7	11	18	36	50	−14	32	
10	Šibenik (R)	36	5	12	19	24	56	−32	27	Relegation to First Football League

Source: SuperSport HNL
Rules for classification: 1) Points; 2) Head-to-head points; 3) Head-to-head goal difference; 4) Head-to-head goals scored (at home if two teams tied); 5) Goal difference; 6) Goals scored; 7) Play-off
(Note: Criteria 2-4 and 7 is only used if deciding champion, teams to international competition or teams for relegation and in that case criteria 6 will not be used).
(C) Champions; (R) Relegated

=== First Football League ===
Pos	Team	Pld	W	D	L	GF	GA	GD	Pts	Qualification or relegation
1	Rudeš (C, P)	33	19	7	7	56	26	+30	64	Promotion to the Croatian Football League
2	Vukovar 1991	33	17	12	4	57	25	+32	63	
3	Cibalia	33	13	15	5	37	26	+11	54	
4	BSK Bijelo Brdo	33	12	8	13	41	37	+4	44	
5	Jarun	33	13	5	15	43	57	−14	44	
6	Orijent	33	10	13	10	45	45	0	43	
7	Croatia Zmijavci	33	12	7	14	37	44	−7	43	
8	Solin	33	12	7	14	47	55	−8	43	
9	Dubrava	33	11	9	13	38	39	−1	42	
10	Dugopolje	33	9	14	10	30	35	−5	41	
11	Kustošija (R)	33	9	7	17	35	50	−15	34	Relegation play-off
12	Hrvatski Dragovoljac (R)	33	4	10	19	31	58	−27	22	Relegation to the Second Football League

Updated to match(es) played on 5 June 2023. Source: Prva NL
Rules for classification: 1) Points; 2) Head-to-head points; 3) Head-to-head goal difference; 4) Head-to-head goals scored (at home if two teams tied); 5) Goal difference; 6) Goals scored; 7) Play-off
(Note: Criteria 2-4 and 7 is only used if deciding champion, teams for promotion or relegation and in that case criteria 6 will not be used).
(C) Champions; (P) Promoted; (R) Relegated

=== Second Football League ===
Pos	Team	Pld	W	D	L	GF	GA	GD	Pts	Qualification or relegation
1	Sesvete (C, P)	30	19	8	3	64	24	+40	65	Promotion to the First Football League
2	Zrinski Jurjevac (P)	30	19	6	5	45	22	+23	63	Promotion to the First Football League
3	Jadran Luka Ploče	30	17	9	4	54	23	+31	60	
4	Mladost Ždralovi	30	14	8	8	48	26	+22	50	
5	Bjelovar	30	12	10	8	46	31	+15	46	
6	Dugo Selo	30	12	9	9	50	43	+7	45	
7	Opatija	30	12	9	9	48	42	+6	45	
8	Hrvace	30	10	8	12	48	49	−1	38	
9	Belišće	30	10	7	13	39	47	−8	37	
10	Jadran Poreč	30	9	9	12	51	61	−10	36	
11	Marsonia 1909	30	11	3	16	40	52	−12	36	
12	Grobničan	30	10	5	15	42	44	−2	35	
13	Trnje	30	9	7	14	43	55	−12	34	
14	Zagorec Krapina (R)	30	9	7	14	36	53	−17	34	Relegation to the Third Football League
15	Osijek II (R)	30	7	4	19	32	64	−32	25	Relegation to the Third Football League
16	Međimurje (R)	30	4	3	23	22	72	−50	15	Relegation to the Third Football League

Updated to match(es) played on 5 June 2023. Source: Druga-NL.com
Rules for classification: 1) Points; 2) Head-to-head points; 3) Head-to-head goal difference; 4) Head-to-head goals scored (at home if two teams tied); 5) Goal difference; 6) Goals scored; 7) Play-off
(Note: Criteria 2-4 and 7 is only used if deciding champion, teams for promotion or relegation and in that case criteria 6 will not be used).
(C) Champions; (P) Promoted; (R) Relegated

== Croatian clubs in Europe ==
=== Summary ===
Club	Competition	Starting round	Final round	Matches played
Dinamo Zagreb	Champions League	2nd qualifying round	Group stage	12
Hajduk Split	Conference League	3rd qualifying round	Play-off round	4
Osijek	Conference League	2nd qualifying round		2
Rijeka	Conference League	2nd qualifying round		2
ŽNK Split	Women's Champions League	1st qualifying round		2
Dinamo Zagreb U19	Youth League	Group stage		6
Hajduk Split U19	Youth League	First round	Final	9

=== Dinamo Zagreb ===
Date	Venue	Opponents	Score	Dinamo Zagreb scorer(s)	Report
2022–23 Champions League - Second qualifying round
19 July 2022	Stadion Maksimir, Zagreb	(North Macedonia) Shkupi	2–2	Ademi, Petković	UEFA.com
26 July 2022	Toše Proeski Arena, Skopje	(North Macedonia) Shkupi	1–0	Ademi	UEFA.com
2022–23 Champions League - Third qualifying round
2 August 2022	Huvepharma Arena, Razgrad	(Bulgaria) Ludogorets Razgrad	2–1	Perić, Padt (o.g.)	UEFA.com
9 August 2022	Stadion Maksimir, Zagreb	(Bulgaria) Ludogorets Razgrad	4–2	Drmić, Oršić (2), Petković	UEFA.com
2022–23 Champions League - Play-off round
16 August 2022	Aspmyra Stadion, Bodø	(Norway) Bodø/Glimt	0–1		UEFA.com
24 August 2022	Stadion Maksimir, Zagreb	(Norway) Bodø/Glimt	4–1 (a.e.t.)	Oršić, Petković, Drmić, Bočkaj	UEFA.com
2022–23 UEFA Champions League - Group stage
6 September 2022	Stadion Maksimir, Zagreb	(England) Chelsea	1–0	Oršić	UEFA.com
14 September 2022	San Siro, Milan	(Italy) Milan	1–3	Oršić	UEFA.com
5 October 2022	Red Bull Arena, Wals-Siezenheim	(Austria) Red Bull Salzburg	0–1		UEFA.com
11 October 2022	Stadion Maksimir, Zagreb	(Austria) Red Bull Salzburg	1–1	Ljubičić	UEFA.com
25 October 2022	Stadion Maksimir, Zagreb	(Italy) Milan	0–4		UEFA.com
2 November 2022	Stamford Bridge, London	(England) Chelsea	1–2	Petković	UEFA.com

=== Hajduk Split ===
Date	Venue	Opponents	Score	Hajduk Split scorer(s)	Report
2022–23 Conference League - Third qualifying round
4 August 2022	Stadion Poljud, Split	(Portugal) Vitória de Guimarães	3–1	Sahiti, Melnjak, Krovinović	UEFA.com
10 August 2022	Estádio D. Afonso Henriques, Guimarães	(Portugal) Vitória de Guimarães	0–1		UEFA.com
2022–23 Conference League - Play-off round
18 August 2022	Estadi Ciutat de València, Valencia	(Spain) Villarreal	2–4	Biuk, Fossati	UEFA.com
25 August 2022	Stadion Poljud, Split	(Spain) Villarreal	0–2		UEFA.com

=== Osijek ===
Date	Venue	Opponents	Score	Osijek scorer(s)	Report
2022–23 Conference League - Second qualifying round
21 July 2022	Astana Arena, Nur-Sultan	(Kazakhstan) Kyzylzhar	2–1	Topčagić, Kleinheisler	UEFA.com
28 July 2022	Stadion Gradski vrt, Osijek	(Kazakhstan) Kyzylzhar	0–2		UEFA.com

=== Rijeka ===
Date	Venue	Opponents	Score	Rijeka scorer(s)	Report
2022–23 Conference League - Second qualifying round
21 July 2022	Stadion Rujevica, Rijeka	(Sweden) Djurgårdens IF	1–2	Vučkić	UEFA.com
28 July 2022	Tele2 Arena, Stockholm	(Sweden) Djurgårdens IF	0–2		UEFA.com

=== ŽNK Split ===
Date	Venue	Opponents	Score	ŽNK Split scorer(s)	Report
2022–23 UEFA Women's Champions League - First qualifying round
18 August 2022	Stadion Varteks, Varaždin	(Kazakhstan) BIIK Kazygurt	1–5	Kapetanović	UEFA.com
21 August 2022	Stadion Varteks, Varaždin	(Georgia (country)) Lanchkhuti	2–0	Hadžić, Mikulica	UEFA.com

=== Dinamo Zagreb U19 ===
Date	Venue	Opponents	Score	Dinamo Zagreb U19 scorer(s)	Report
2022–23 UEFA Youth League - Group stage
6 September 2022	Stadion Kranjčevićeva, Zagreb	(England) Chelsea	4–2	Gubijan, Rukavina, Krdžalić, Topić	UEFA.com
14 September 2022	Vismara Sports Centre, Milan	(Italy) Milan	0–3		UEFA.com
5 October 2022	Untersberg-Arena, Grödig	(Austria) Red Bull Salzburg	0–2		UEFA.com
11 October 2022	Stadion Kranjčevićeva, Zagreb	(Austria) Red Bull Salzburg	2–1	Katinić, Topić	UEFA.com
25 October 2022	Stadion Kranjčevićeva, Zagreb	(Italy) Milan	1–2	Šakota	UEFA.com
2 November 2022	Cobham Training Centre, Surrey	(England) Chelsea	0–4		UEFA.com

=== Hajduk Split U19 ===
Date	Venue	Opponents	Score	Hajduk Split U19 scorer(s)	Report
2022–23 UEFA Youth League Domestic Champions Path - First round
12 September 2022	Stadion Poljud, Split	(Azerbaijan) Gabala	3–0	Vrcić, Čalušić, Nazor	UEFA.com
4 October 2022	Gabala City Stadium, Qabala	(Azerbaijan) Gabala	2–1	Vušković, Vrcić	UEFA.com
2022–23 UEFA Youth League Domestic Champions Path - Second round
26 October 2022	Loni Papuçiu Stadium, Fier	(Albania) Apolonia	3–0	Vrcić, Antunović, Brajković	UEFA.com
4 November 2022	Stadion Poljud, Split	(Albania) Apolonia	3–1	Vrcić, Nazor, Pukštas	UEFA.com
2022–23 UEFA Youth League knockout phase - Play-offs
8 February 2023	Stadion Poljud, Split	(Ukraine) Shakhtar Donetsk	1–0	Vušković	UEFA.com
2022–23 UEFA Youth League knockout phase - Round of 16
28 February 2023	Stadion Poljud, Split	(England) Manchester City	2–1	Brajković, Antunović	UEFA.com
2022–23 UEFA Youth League knockout phase - Quarter-finals
15 March 2023	Westfalenstadion, Dortmund	(Germany) Borussia Dortmund	1–1 (a.e.t.); 9–8 (p)	Antunović	UEFA.com
2022–23 UEFA Youth League knockout phase - Semi-finals
21 April 2023	Stade de Genève, Geneva	(Italy) Milan	3–1	Vrcić, Pukštas, Hrgović	UEFA.com
2022–23 UEFA Youth League knockout phase - Final
24 April 2023	Stade de Genève, Geneva	(Netherlands) AZ	0–5		UEFA.com
