= 2022–23 in Italian football =

Football in Italy
- Season: 2022–23

Men's football
- Serie A: Napoli
- Serie B: Frosinone
- Serie C: Feralpisalò (Group A); Reggiana (Group B); Catanzaro (Group C)
- Serie D: Sestri Levante
- Coppa Italia: Internazionale
- Coppa Italia Serie C: Vicenza
- Supercoppa Italiana: Internazionale

Women's football
- Serie A: Roma
- Coppa Italia: Juventus
- Supercoppa Italiana: Roma

The 2022–23 season was the 121st season of competitive football in Italy. Italian clubs reached all three European finals but lost all three.

== National teams ==
=== Men ===
==== Italy national football team ====
===== Friendlies =====
16 November 2022	Albania	1–3	Italy	Tirana, Albania
20:45 CET (UTC+01:00)	Ismajli 16'	Report	Di Lorenzo 20'; Grifo 25', 64'	Stadium: Arena Kombëtare; Attendance: 22,000; Referee: Genc Nuza (Kosovo)

20 November 2022	Austria	2–0	Italy	Wien, Austria
20:45 CET (UTC+01:00)	Schlager 6'; Alaba 35'	Report		Stadium: Ernst-Happel-Stadion; Attendance: 18,000; Referee: Christian Dingert (Germany)

===== UEFA Nations League =====
====== Group 3 ======
Pos	Team	Pld	W	D	L	GF	GA	GD	Pts	Qualification or relegation	(Italy)	(Hungary)	(Germany)	(England)
1	Italy	6	3	2	1	8	7	+1	11	Qualification for Nations League Finals	—	2–1	1–1	1–0
2	Hungary	6	3	1	2	8	5	+3	10		0–2	—	1–1	1–0
3	Germany	6	1	4	1	11	9	+2	7		5–2	0–1	—	1–1
4	England (R)	6	0	3	3	4	10	−6	3	Relegation to League B	0–0	0–4	3–3	—

Source: UEFA
(R) Relegated

23 September 2022	Italy	1–0	England	Milan, Italy
20:45 CEST (UTC+02:00)	Raspadori 68'	Report		Stadium: San Siro; Attendance: 50,640; Referee: Jesús Gil Manzano (Spain)

26 September 2022	Hungary	0–2	Italy	Budapest, Hungary
20:45 CEST (UTC+02:00)		Report	Raspadori 27'; Dimarco 52'	Stadium: Puskás Aréna; Attendance: 57,300; Referee: Benoît Bastien (France)

====== 2023 UEFA Nations League Finals ======
15 June 2023 SF	Spain	2–1	Italy	Enschede, Netherlands
20:45 CEST (UTC+02:00)	Pino 3'; Joselu 88'	Report	Immobile 11' (pen.)	Stadium: De Grolsch Veste; Attendance: 24,558; Referee: Slavko Vinčić (Slovenia)

18 June 2023 3rd	Netherlands	2–3	Italy	Enschede, Netherlands
15:00	Bergwijn 68'; Wijnaldum 90'	Report	Dimarco 6'; Frattesi 20'; Chiesa 72'	Stadium: De Grolsch Veste; Referee: Glenn Nyberg (Sweden)

===== UEFA Euro 2024 qualifying =====
====== Group C ======
Pos	Team	Pld	W	D	L	GF	GA	GD	Pts	Qualification	(England)	(Italy)	(Ukraine)	(North Macedonia)	(Malta)
1	England	8	6	2	0	22	4	+18	20	Qualify for final tournament	—	3–1	2–0	7–0	2–0
2	Italy	8	4	2	2	16	9	+7	14 (Note: Head-to-head points: Italy 4, Ukraine 1.)	Qualify for final tournament	1–2	—	2–1	5–2	4–0
3	Ukraine	8	4	2	2	11	8	+3	14	Advance to play-offs via Nations League	1–1	0–0	—	2–0	1–0
4	North Macedonia	8	2	2	4	10	20	−10	8		1–1	1–1	2–3	—	2–1
5	Malta	8	0	0	8	2	20	−18	0		0–4	0–2	1–3	0–2	—

Source: UEFA
Rules for classification: Qualification tiebreakers
Notes:

23 March 2023 1	Italy	1–2	England	Naples, Italy
20:45 CET (UTC+01:00)	Retegui 56'	Report	Rice 13'; Kane 44' (pen.)	Stadium: Stadio Diego Armando Maradona; Attendance: 44,536; Referee: Srđan Jovanović (Serbia)

26 March 2023 2	Malta	0–2	Italy	Ta' Qali, Malta
20:45 CEST (UTC+02:00)		Report	Retegui 15'; Pessina 27'	Stadium: National Stadium, Ta' Qali; Attendance: 16,015; Referee: Georgi Kabakov (Bulgaria)

=== Women ===
==== Italy women's national football team ====
===== Friendlies =====
1 July 2022	Italy	1–1	Spain	Castel di Sangro
	Bergamaschi 48'		Putellas 67'	Stadium: Stadio Teofilo Patini

10 October 2022	Italy	0–1	Brazil	Genoa, Italy
				Stadium: Luigi Ferraris Stadium

11 November 2022	Italy	0–1	Austria	Lignano Sabbiadoro, Italy
17:30				Stadium: Stadio Guido Teghil

15 November 2022	Northern Ireland	1–0	Italy
20:00

11 April 2023	Italy	2–1	Colombia

===== UEFA Women's Euro =====
====== Group D ======
Pos	Team	Pld	W	D	L	GF	GA	GD	Pts	Qualification
1	France	3	2	1	0	8	3	+5	7	Advance to knockout stage
2	Belgium	3	1	1	1	3	3	0	4	Advance to knockout stage
3	Iceland	3	0	3	0	3	3	0	3	
4	Italy	3	0	1	2	2	7	−5	1	

Source: UEFA
Rules for classification: Group stage tiebreakers

10 July 2022	France	5–1	Italy	Rotherham, England
		Report		Stadium: New York Stadium

14 July 2022	Italy	1–1	Iceland	Rotherham, England
		Report		Stadium: New York Stadium

18 July 2022	Italy	1–1	Belgium	Manchester, England
		Report		Stadium: Manchester City Academy Stadium

===== 2023 FIFA Women's World Cup qualification =====
====== Group G ======
Pos	Team	Pld	W	D	L	GF	GA	GD	Pts	Qualification	(Italy)	(Switzerland)	(Romania)	(Croatia)	(Lithuania)	(Moldova)
1	Italy	10	9	0	1	40	2	+38	27	2023 FIFA Women's World Cup	—	1–2	2–0	3–0	7–0	3–0
2	Switzerland	10	8	1	1	44	4	+40	25	Play-offs	0–1	—	2–0	5–0	4–1	15–0
3	Romania	10	6	1	3	21	11	+10	19		0–5	1–1	—	2–0	3–0	3–0
4	Croatia	10	3	1	6	6	18	−12	10		0–5	0–2	0–1	—	0–0	4–0
5	Lithuania	10	1	2	7	7	35	−28	5		0–5	0–7	1–7	0–1	—	4–0
6	Moldova	10	0	1	9	1	49	−48	1		0–8	0–6	0–4	0–1	1–1	—

Source: UEFA
Rules for classification: Tiebreakers

2 September 2022	Moldova	0–8	Italy	Chișinău, Moldova
		Report (UEFA)	Giugliano 26'; Giacinti 32', 82'; Caruso 38', 64', 78', 90+6'; Bonfantini 59'	Stadium: Zimbru Stadium; Referee: Emilie Torkelsen (Norway)

6 September 2022	Italy	2–0	Romania	Ferrara
		Report (UEFA)		Stadium: Stadio Paolo Mazza; Referee: Sara Persson (Sweden)

===== 2023 Arnold Clark Cup =====
Pos	Team	Pld	W	D	L	GF	GA	GD	Pts
1	England (H, C)	3	3	0	0	12	2	+10	9
2	Belgium	3	2	0	1	5	8	−3	6
3	Italy	3	1	0	2	4	5	−1	3
4	South Korea	3	0	0	3	2	8	−6	0

Source: BBC
Rules for classification: 1) points; 2) goal difference; 3) goals scored; 4) head-to-head result; 5) fair play ranking.
(C) Champions; (H) Hosts

16 February 2023	Italy	1–2	Belgium	Milton Keynes, England
	Giugliano 64'	Report	Detruyer 16'; Wullaert 90'	Stadium: Stadium MK; Attendance: 8,705; Referee: Ewa Augustyn (Poland)

19 February 2023	England	2–1	Italy	Coventry, England
	Daly 32', 71'	Report	Cantore 62'	Stadium: Coventry Building Society Arena; Attendance: 32,128; Referee: Ivana Projkovska (North Macedonia)

22 February 2023	South Korea	1–2	Italy	Bristol, England
	Ji So-yun 69'	Report	Caruso 6'; Rosucci 90+5'	Stadium: Ashton Gate Stadium; Attendance: 6,938; Referee: Andreza de Siqueira (Brazil)

== League season ==
=== Men ===
==== Promotions and relegations (pre-season) ====
Teams promoted to Serie A

- Lecce
- Cremonese
- Monza

Teams relegated from Serie A

- Cagliari
- Genoa
- Venezia

Teams promoted to Serie B

- Südtirol (Group A)
- Modena (Group B)
- Bari (Group C)

Teams relegated from Serie B

- Vicenza
- Alessandria
- Crotone
- Pordenone

==== Serie A ====
Pos	Team	Pld	W	D	L	GF	GA	GD	Pts	Qualification or relegation
1	Napoli (C)	38	28	6	4	77	28	+49	90	Qualification for the Champions League group stage (Note: Should the first and second, or 17th and 18th-placed teams at the end of the season be tied on points, a play-off tiebreaker match was held at a neutral site to determine the title and final team relegated respectively.)
2	Lazio	38	22	8	8	60	30	+30	74	Qualification for the Champions League group stage
3	Inter Milan	38	23	3	12	71	42	+29	72	Qualification for the Champions League group stage
4	Milan	38	20	10	8	64	43	+21	70	Qualification for the Champions League group stage
5	Atalanta	38	19	7	12	66	48	+18	64	Qualification for the Europa League group stage (Note: Since the winners of the 2022–23 Coppa Italia, Inter Milan, qualified for the Champions League, the Europa League berth awarded to the Coppa Italia winners was passed to the sixth-placed team, and the Europa Conference League berth awarded to the sixth-placed team was passed to the seventh-placed team.)
6	Roma	38	18	9	11	50	38	+12	63	Qualification for the Europa League group stage
7	Juventus (Note: Juventus were excluded from UEFA competitions due to violation of UEFA's financial regulations.)	38	22	6	10	56	33	+23	62 (Note: Juventus were deducted 10 points as punishment for capital gain violations.)	
8	Fiorentina	38	15	11	12	53	43	+10	56	Qualification for the Εuropa Conference League play-off round
9	Bologna	38	14	12	12	53	49	+4	54	
10	Torino	38	14	11	13	42	41	+1	53	
11	Monza	38	14	10	14	48	52	−4	52	
12	Udinese	38	11	13	14	47	48	−1	46	
13	Sassuolo	38	12	9	17	47	61	−14	45	
14	Empoli	38	10	13	15	37	49	−12	43	
15	Salernitana	38	9	15	14	48	62	−14	42	
16	Lecce	38	8	12	18	33	46	−13	36	
17	Spezia (R)	38	6	13	19	31	62	−31	31 (Note: Head-to-head points: Spezia 4 Hellas Verona 1)	Qualification for the Relegation tie-breaker
18	Hellas Verona (O)	38	7	10	21	31	59	−28	31	Qualification for the Relegation tie-breaker
19	Cremonese (R)	38	5	12	21	36	69	−33	27	Relegation to Serie B
20	Sampdoria (R)	38	3	10	25	24	71	−47	19	Relegation to Serie B

Source: Serie A
Rules for classification: 1) Points; 2) Tiebreaker for Champions team and third relegated team; 3) Head-to-head points; 4) Head-to-head goal difference; 5) Goal difference; 6) Goals scored; 7) Draw. (Note: Head-to-head record is used only after all the matches between the teams in question have been played)
(C) Champions; (O) Play-off winners; (R) Relegated

==== Serie B ====
Pos	Team	Pld	W	D	L	GF	GA	GD	Pts	Promotion, qualification or relegation
1	Frosinone (C, P)	38	24	8	6	63	26	+37	80	Promotion to Serie A
2	Genoa (Note: Genoa were deducted one point due to income tax payment irregularities.) (P)	38	21	11	6	53	28	+25	73	Promotion to Serie A
3	Bari	38	17	14	7	58	37	+21	65	Qualification for promotion play-offs semi-finals
4	Parma (Note: Parma were deducted one point for missing the deadline to fulfil obligations for February taxes on the salary bill.)	38	17	10	11	48	39	+9	60 (Note: Parma finished ahead of Cagliari on head-to-head points: Cagliari 1–1 Parma, Parma 2–1 Cagliari.)	Qualification for promotion play-offs semi-finals
5	Cagliari (O, P)	38	15	15	8	50	34	+16	60	Qualification for promotion play-offs preliminary round
6	Südtirol	38	14	16	8	38	34	+4	58	Qualification for promotion play-offs preliminary round
7	Reggina (Note: Reggina were deducted five points for failing to pay taxes and player salaries on time. The deduction was initially seven points; later relegated to Serie D after enduring serious financial difficulties for several years. Brescia was readmitted into Serie B.) (E)	38	17	4	17	49	45	+4	50	Revival in Serie D
8	Venezia	38	13	10	15	51	50	+1	49	Qualification for promotion play-offs preliminary round
9	Palermo	38	11	16	11	48	49	−1	49	
10	Modena	38	13	9	16	47	53	−6	48	
11	Pisa	38	11	14	13	48	42	+6	47 (Note: Head-to-head points: Pisa 5, Ascoli 5, Como 4. Head-to-head goal difference: Pisa +1, Ascoli −1.)	
12	Ascoli	38	12	11	15	40	47	−7	47	
13	Como	38	10	17	11	47	48	−1	47	
14	Ternana	38	11	10	17	37	52	−15	43 (Note: Ternana finished ahead of Cittadella on head-to-head goal difference: Cittadella 0–2 Ternana, Ternana 1–2 Cittadella.)	
15	Cittadella	38	9	16	13	34	45	−11	43	
16	Brescia	38	9	13	16	36	57	−21	40	Spared from relegation
17	Cosenza (O)	38	9	13	16	30	53	−23	40	Qualification for relegation play-out
18	Perugia (R)	38	10	9	19	40	52	−12	39	Relegation to Serie C
19	SPAL (R)	38	8	14	16	41	51	−10	38	Relegation to Serie C
20	Benevento (R)	38	7	14	17	33	49	−16	35	Relegation to Serie C

Source: Soccerway (in English)
Rules for classification: 1) Points; 2) Head-to-head points; 3) Head-to-head goal difference; 4) Goal difference; 5) Goals scored; 6) Draw.
(C) Champions; (E) Eliminated; (O) Play-off winners; (P) Promoted; (R) Relegated

==== Serie C ====
Group A (North)

Pos	Team	Pld	Pts
1	Feralpisalò (C, P)	38	71
2	Pordenone (E)	38	62
3	Lecco (O, P)	38	62
4	Pro Sesto	38	60
5	Padova	38	59
6	Virtus Verona	38	58
7	Vicenza	38	58
8	Renate	38	53
9	Arzignano Valchiampo	38	53
10	Novara	38	52
11	Pergolettese	38	51
12	Pro Patria	38	50
13	Juventus Next Gen	38	49
14	Trento	38	46
15	Pro Vercelli	38	46
16	Mantova (T)	38	45
17	Sangiuliano City (R)	38	42
18	Triestina (O)	38	39
19	AlbinoLeffe (O)	38	38
20	Piacenza (R)	38	38

Updated to match(es) played on 16 April 2023.
Source: Lega Pro, Soccerway (in English)
(C) Champions;
(E) Eliminated;
(O) Play-off winners;
(P) Promoted;
(R) Relegated;
(T) Qualified, but not yet for the particular phase indicated
Group B (Centre)

Pos	Team	Pld	Pts
1	Reggiana (C, P)	38	81
2	Cesena	38	79
3	Virtus Entella	38	79
4	Carrarese	38	62
5	Gubbio	38	61
6	Pontedera	38	60
7	Ancona	38	58
8	Lucchese	38	51
9	Siena (E)	38	48
10	Rimini	38	47
11	Recanatese	38	47
12	Fermana	38	44
13	Olbia	38	41
14	Fiorenzuola	38	41
15	Torres	38	41
16	Vis Pesaro	38	39
17	Alessandria (O)	38	38
18	San Donato Tavarnelle (R)	38	37
19	Imolese (R)	38	30
20	Montevarchi (R)	38	28

Updated to match(es) played on 6 April 2023.
Source: Lega Pro, Soccerway (in English)
(C) Champions;
(E) Eliminated;
(O) Play-off winners;
(P) Promoted;
(R) Relegated
Group C (South)

Pos	Team	Pld	Pts
1	Catanzaro (P)	38	96
2	Crotone	38	80
3	Pescara	38	65
4	Foggia	38	61
5	Audace Cerignola	38	60
6	Picerno	38	59
7	Monopoli	38	54
8	Latina	38	49
9	Potenza	38	48
10	Juve Stabia	38	46
11	Taranto	38	46
12	Giugliano	38	46
13	Virtus Francavilla	38	45
14	Avellino	38	43
15	Turris	38	43
16	Monterosi Tuscia	38	42
17	Messina (O)	38	41
18	Gelbison (R)	38	36
19	Viterbese (R)	38	33
20	Fidelis Andria (R)	38	33

Updated to match(es) played on 16 April 2023.
Source: Lega Pro, Soccerway (in English)
(O) Play-off winners;
(P) Promoted;
(R) Relegated

=== Women ===
==== Serie A (women) ====
Pos	Team	Pld	W	D	L	GF	GA	GD	Pts	Qualification or relegation
1	Roma	18	16	0	2	43	12	+31	48	Qualification for the championship round
2	Juventus	18	12	4	2	46	17	+29	40	Qualification for the championship round
3	Inter Milan	18	10	5	3	45	20	+25	35	Qualification for the championship round
4	AC Milan	18	11	1	6	38	27	+11	34	Qualification for the championship round
5	Fiorentina	18	11	1	6	30	30	0	34	Qualification for the championship round
6	Sassuolo	18	4	5	9	18	28	−10	17	Qualification for the relegation round
7	Pomigliano	18	4	2	12	14	31	−17	14	Qualification for the relegation round
8	Parma	18	3	4	11	18	41	−23	13	Qualification for the relegation round
9	Como	18	2	5	11	18	35	−17	11	Qualification for the relegation round
10	Sampdoria	18	3	1	14	9	38	−29	10	Qualification for the relegation round

Source: FIGC
Rules for classification: 1) Points; 2) Head-to-head points; 3) Goal difference; 4) Number of goals scored; 5) Head-to-head goal difference; 6) Head-to-head away goals scored

Pos	Team	Pld	W	D	L	GF	GA	GD	Pts	Qualification or relegation	ROM	JUV	MIL	FIO	INT
1	Roma (C)	26	22	1	3	68	26	+42	67	Qualification for the Champions League second round	—	3–2	3–1	2–1	2–1
2	Juventus	26	16	6	4	69	35	+34	54	Qualification for the Champions League first round	5–2	—	2–0	4–3	2–2
3	AC Milan	26	13	5	8	52	42	+10	44		2–2	3–3	—	3–3	3–1
4	Fiorentina	26	13	3	10	44	51	−7	42		1–5	4–2	1–1	—	1–0
5	Inter Milan	26	11	6	9	55	38	+17	39		1–6	1–3	0–1	4–0	—

Source: FIGC
Rules for classification: 1) Points; 2) Head-to-head points; 3) Goal difference; 4) Number of goals scored; 5) Head-to-head goal difference; 6) Head-to-head away goals scored
(C) Champions

Pos	Team	Pld	W	D	L	GF	GA	GD	Pts	Qualification or relegation	SAS	COM	SAM	POM	PAR
1	Sassuolo	26	11	5	10	36	36	0	38		—	2–1	3–0	2–0	5–4
2	Como	26	6	7	13	30	44	−14	25		2–1	—	2–1	0–1	1–0
3	Sampdoria	26	6	3	17	23	50	−27	21		0–2	1–1	—	4–1	3–0
4	Pomigliano (Q)	26	6	3	17	26	49	−23	21	Qualification for the relegation play-offs	1–2	1–3	2–4	—	4–1
5	Parma (R)	26	3	7	16	28	60	−32	16	Relegation to Serie B	0–1	2–2	1–1	2–2	—

Source: FIGC
Rules for classification: 1) Points; 2) Head-to-head points; 3) Goal difference; 4) Number of goals scored; 5) Head-to-head goal difference; 6) Head-to-head away goals scored
(Q) Qualified for the phase indicated; (R) Relegated

== Cup competitions ==
=== Coppa Italia ===
==== Final ====
24 May 2023
21:00 CEST

Fiorentina	1–2	Internazionale
González 3'	Report	Martínez 29', 37'

Stadio Olimpico, Rome
Attendance: 68,500
Referee: Massimiliano Irrati

=== Supercoppa Italiana ===
18 January 2023
22:00 AST

AC Milan	0–3	Inter Milan
	Report	Dimarco 10'; Džeko 21'; Martínez 77'

King Fahd International Stadium, Riyadh (Saudi Arabia)
Attendance: 51,357
Referee: Fabio Maresca

=== Coppa Italia (women) ===
==== Final ====
4 June 2023

Juventus	1–0	Roma
Bonansea 90+3'	Report

Stadio Arechi, Salerno
Referee: Michele Delrio

=== Supercoppa Italiana (women) ===
==== Final ====
5 November 2022
14:30 UTC+01:00

Juventus	1–1 (a.e.t.)	Roma
Boattin 60'	Report	Giacinti 19'
Penalties
Boattin (penalty scored); Sembrant (penalty scored); Girelli (penalty missed); Cernoia (penalty scored); Cantore (penalty missed)	3–4	(penalty scored) Giugliano; (penalty scored) Linari; (penalty missed) Glionna; (penalty scored) Lázaro; (penalty scored) Haavi

Stadio Ennio Tardini, Parma
Referee: Maria Marotta

== UEFA competitions ==
=== UEFA Champions League ===
==== Group stage ====
===== Group A =====
Pos	Team	Pld	W	D	L	GF	GA	GD	Pts	Qualification	NAP	LIV	AJX	RAN
1	(Italy) Napoli	6	5	0	1	20	6	+14	15 (Note: Tied on head-to-head points. Head-to-head goal difference: Napoli +1, Liverpool −1.)	Advance to knockout phase	—	4–1	4–2	3–0
2	(England) Liverpool	6	5	0	1	17	6	+11	15	Advance to knockout phase	2–0	—	2–1	2–0
3	(Netherlands) Ajax	6	2	0	4	11	16	−5	6	Transfer to Europa League	1–6	0–3	—	4–0
4	(Scotland) Rangers	6	0	0	6	2	22	−20	0		0–3	1–7	1–3	—

Source: UEFA

===== Group C =====
Pos	Team	Pld	W	D	L	GF	GA	GD	Pts	Qualification	BAY	INT	BAR	PLZ
1	(Germany) Bayern Munich	6	6	0	0	18	2	+16	18	Advance to knockout phase	—	2–0	2–0	5–0
2	(Italy) Inter Milan	6	3	1	2	10	7	+3	10	Advance to knockout phase	0–2	—	1–0	4–0
3	(Spain) Barcelona	6	2	1	3	12	12	0	7	Transfer to Europa League	0–3	3–3	—	5–1
4	(Czech Republic) Viktoria Plzeň	6	0	0	6	5	24	−19	0		2–4	0–2	2–4	—

Source: UEFA

===== Group E =====
Pos	Team	Pld	W	D	L	GF	GA	GD	Pts	Qualification	CHE	MIL	SAL	DZG
1	(England) Chelsea	6	4	1	1	10	4	+6	13	Advance to knockout phase	—	3–0	1–1	2–1
2	(Italy) Milan	6	3	1	2	12	7	+5	10	Advance to knockout phase	0–2	—	4–0	3–1
3	(Austria) Red Bull Salzburg	6	1	3	2	5	9	−4	6	Transfer to Europa League	1–2	1–1	—	1–0
4	(Croatia) Dinamo Zagreb	6	1	1	4	4	11	−7	4		1–0	0–4	1–1	—

Source: UEFA

===== Group H =====
Pos	Team	Pld	W	D	L	GF	GA	GD	Pts	Qualification	BEN	PAR	JUV	MHA
1	(Portugal) Benfica	6	4	2	0	16	7	+9	14 (Note: Tied on head-to-head results, overall goal difference and overall goals scored. Overall away goals scored: Benfica 9, Paris Saint-Germain 6.)	Advance to knockout phase	—	1–1	4–3	2–0
2	(France) Paris Saint-Germain	6	4	2	0	16	7	+9	14	Advance to knockout phase	1–1	—	2–1	7–2
3	(Italy) Juventus	6	1	0	5	9	13	−4	3 (Note: Tied on head-to-head results. Overall goal difference is used as the tiebreaker.)	Transfer to Europa League	1–2	1–2	—	3–1
4	(Israel) Maccabi Haifa	6	1	0	5	7	21	−14	3		1–6	1–3	2–0	—

Source: UEFA

==== Knockout phase ====
===== Round of 16 =====
Team 1	Agg.	Team 2	1st leg	2nd leg
Milan (Italy)	1–0	(England) Tottenham Hotspur	1–0	0–0
Eintracht Frankfurt (Germany)	0–5	(Italy) Napoli	0–2	0–3
Inter Milan (Italy)	1–0	(Portugal) Porto	1–0	0–0

===== Quarter-finals =====
Team 1	Agg.	Team 2	1st leg	2nd leg
Benfica (Portugal)	3–5 (Note: Order of legs reversed after original draw.)	(Italy) Inter Milan	0–2	3–3
Milan (Italy)	2–1	(Italy) Napoli	1–0	1–1

===== Semi-finals =====
Team 1	Agg.	Team 2	1st leg	2nd leg
Milan (Italy)	0–3	(Italy) Inter Milan	0–2	0–1

===== Final =====
10 June 2023
22:00 UTC+3

Manchester City (The Football Association)	1–0	(Italian Football Federation) Inter Milan
Rodri 68'	Report

Atatürk Olympic Stadium, Istanbul
Attendance: 71,412
Referee: Szymon Marciniak (Poland)

=== UEFA Europa League ===
==== Group stage ====
===== Group C =====
Pos	Team	Pld	W	D	L	GF	GA	GD	Pts	Qualification	BET	ROM	LUD	HJK
1	(Spain) Real Betis	6	5	1	0	12	4	+8	16	Advance to round of 16	—	1–1	3–2	3–0
2	(Italy) Roma	6	3	1	2	11	7	+4	10	Advance to knockout round play-offs	1–2	—	3–1	3–0
3	(Bulgaria) Ludogorets Razgrad	6	2	1	3	8	9	−1	7	Transfer to Europa Conference League	0–1	2–1	—	2–0
4	(Finland) HJK	6	0	1	5	2	13	−11	1		0–2	1–2	1–1	—

Source: UEFA

===== Group F =====
Pos	Team	Pld	W	D	L	GF	GA	GD	Pts	Qualification	FEY	MID	LAZ	STU
1	(Netherlands) Feyenoord	6	2	2	2	13	9	+4	8 (Note: Tied on head-to-head results. Overall goal difference is used as the tiebreaker. Between Feyenoord and Midtjylland, overall goals scored is used as the tiebreaker.)	Advance to round of 16	—	2–2	1–0	6–0
2	(Denmark) Midtjylland	6	2	2	2	12	8	+4	8	Advance to knockout round play-offs	2–2	—	5–1	2–0
3	(Italy) Lazio	6	2	2	2	9	11	−2	8	Transfer to Europa Conference League	4–2	2–1	—	2–2
4	(Austria) Sturm Graz	6	2	2	2	4	10	−6	8		1–0	1–0	0–0	—

Source: UEFA

==== Knockout stage ====
===== Knockout round play-offs =====
Team 1	Agg.	Team 2	1st leg	2nd leg
Juventus (Italy)	4–1	(France) Nantes	1–1	3–0
Red Bull Salzburg (Austria)	1–2	(Italy) Roma	1–0	0–2

===== Round of 16 =====
Team 1	Agg.	Team 2	1st leg	2nd leg
Juventus (Italy)	3–0	(Germany) SC Freiburg	1–0	2–0
Roma (Italy)	2–0	(Spain) Real Sociedad	2–0	0–0

===== Quarter-finals =====
Team 1	Agg.	Team 2	1st leg	2nd leg
Juventus (Italy)	2–1	(Portugal) Sporting CP	1–0	1–1
Feyenoord (Netherlands)	2–4	(Italy) Roma	1–0	1–4 (a.e.t.)

===== Semi-finals =====
Team 1	Agg.	Team 2	1st leg	2nd leg
Juventus (Italy)	2–3	(Spain) Sevilla	1–1	1–2 (a.e.t.)
Roma (Italy)	1–0	(Germany) Bayer Leverkusen	1–0	0–0

===== Final =====
31 May 2023
21:00 UTC+2

Sevilla (Spain)	1–1 (a.e.t.)	(Italy) Roma
Mancini 55' (o.g.)	Report	Dybala 35'
Penalties
Ocampos (penalty scored); Lamela (penalty scored); Rakitić (penalty scored); Montiel (penalty scored)	4–1	(penalty scored) Cristante; (penalty missed) Mancini; (penalty missed) Ibañez

Puskás Aréna, Budapest
Attendance: 61,476
Referee: Anthony Taylor (England)

=== UEFA Europa Conference League ===
==== Qualifying phase and play-off round ====
===== Play-off round =====
Team 1	Agg.	Team 2	1st leg	2nd leg
Fiorentina (Italy)	2–1	(Netherlands) Twente	2–1	0–0

==== Group stage ====
===== Group A =====
Pos	Team	Pld	W	D	L	GF	GA	GD	Pts	Qualification	IBS	FIO	HEA	RFS
1	(Turkey) İstanbul Başakşehir	6	4	1	1	14	3	+11	13 (Note: Tied on head-to-head points. Head-to-head goal difference: İstanbul Başakşehir +2, Fiorentina −2.)	Advance to round of 16	—	3–0	3–1	3–0
2	(Italy) Fiorentina	6	4	1	1	14	6	+8	13	Advance to knockout round play-offs	2–1	—	5–1	1–1
3	(Scotland) Heart of Midlothian	6	2	0	4	6	16	−10	6		0–4	0–3	—	2–1
4	(Latvia) RFS	6	0	2	4	2	11	−9	2		0–0	0–3	0–2	—

Source: UEFA

==== Knockout stage ====
===== Knockout round play-offs =====
Team 1	Agg.	Team 2	1st leg	2nd leg
Lazio (Italy)	1–0	(Romania) CFR Cluj	1–0	0–0
Braga (Portugal)	2–7	(Italy) Fiorentina	0–4	2–3

===== Round of 16 =====
Team 1	Agg.	Team 2	1st leg	2nd leg
Fiorentina (Italy)	5–1	(Turkey) Sivasspor	1–0	4–1
Lazio (Italy)	2–4	(Netherlands) AZ	1–2	1–2

===== Quarter-finals =====
Team 1	Agg.	Team 2	1st leg	2nd leg
Lech Poznań (Poland)	4–6	(Italy) Fiorentina	1–4	3–2

===== Semi-finals =====
Team 1	Agg.	Team 2	1st leg	2nd leg
Fiorentina (Italy)	4–3	(Switzerland) Basel	1–2	3–1 (a.e.t.)

===== Final =====
7 June 2023
21:00 UTC+2

Fiorentina (Italian Football Federation)	1–2	(The Football Association) West Ham United
Bonaventura 67'	Report	Benrahma 62' (pen.); Bowen 90'

Fortuna Arena, Prague
Attendance: 17,363
Referee: Carlos del Cerro Grande (Spain)

=== UEFA Youth League ===
==== UEFA Champions League Path ====
===== Group stage =====
====== Group A ======
Pos	Team	Pld	W	D	L	GF	GA	GD	Pts	Qualification	LIV	AJX	RAN	NAP
1	(The Football Association) Liverpool	6	5	0	1	20	8	+12	15	Round of 16	—	4–0	4–1	5–0
2	(Royal Dutch Football Association) Ajax	6	4	1	1	17	10	+7	13	Play-offs	3–1	—	2–1	5–1
3	(Scottish Football Association) Rangers	6	2	0	4	13	20	−7	6		3–4	2–6	—	3–2
4	(Italian Football Federation) Napoli	6	0	1	5	7	19	−12	1		1–2	1–1	2–3	—

Source: UEFA

====== Group C ======
Pos	Team	Pld	W	D	L	GF	GA	GD	Pts	Qualification	BAR	INT	BAY	PLZ
1	(Royal Spanish Football Federation) Barcelona	6	4	2	0	18	7	+11	14	Round of 16	—	2–0	3–2	3–0
2	(Italian Football Federation) Inter Milan	6	2	1	3	10	14	−4	7	Play-offs	1–6	—	2–2	4–2
3	(German Football Association) Bayern Munich	6	1	3	2	13	13	0	6		3–3	2–0	—	1–2
4	(Football Association of the Czech Republic) Viktoria Plzeň	6	1	2	3	8	15	−7	5		1–1	0–3	3–3	—

Source: UEFA

====== Group E ======
Pos	Team	Pld	W	D	L	GF	GA	GD	Pts	Qualification	MIL	SAL	DZG	CHE
1	(Italian Football Federation) Milan	6	4	2	0	12	5	+7	14	Round of 16	—	2–1	3–0	3–1
2	(Austrian Football Association) FC Salzburg	6	2	2	2	11	7	+4	8	Play-offs	1–1	—	2–0	5–1
3	(Croatian Football Federation) Dinamo Zagreb	6	2	0	4	7	14	−7	6		1–2	2–1	—	4–2
4	(The Football Association) Chelsea	6	1	2	3	10	14	−4	5		1–1	1–1	4–0	—

Source: UEFA

====== Group H ======
Pos	Team	Pld	W	D	L	GF	GA	GD	Pts	Qualification	PAR	JUV	BEN	MHA
1	(French Football Federation) Paris Saint-Germain	6	4	1	1	20	11	+9	13	Round of 16	—	5–3	2–3	3–1
2	(Italian Football Federation) Juventus	6	3	2	1	17	14	+3	11	Play-offs	4–4	—	1–1	3–1
3	(Portuguese Football Federation) Benfica	6	2	1	3	12	10	+2	7		0–1	2–3	—	0–1
4	(Israel Football Association) Maccabi Haifa	6	1	0	5	6	20	−14	3		0–5	1–3	2–6	—

Source: UEFA

==== Knockout Phase ====
===== Play-offs =====
Team 1	Score	Team 2
Rukh Lviv (Ukraine)	1–1 (4–3 p)	(Italy) Inter Milan
Genk (Belgium)	0–0 (4–3 p)	(Italy) Juventus

===== Round of 16 =====
Team 1	Score	Team 2
Milan (Italy)	1–0	(Ukraine) Rukh Lviv

===== Quarter-finals =====
Team 1	Score	Team 2
Milan (Italy)	2–0	(Spain) Atlético Madrid

===== Semi-finals =====
Team 1	Score	Team 2
Hajduk Split (Croatia)	3–1	(Italy) Milan

=== UEFA Women's Champions League ===
==== Qualifying rounds ====
===== Round 1 =====
====== Semi-finals ======
Team 1	Score	Team 2
Juventus (Italy)	4–0	(Luxembourg) Union FC
Glasgow City (Scotland)	1–3	(Italy) Roma

====== Final ======
Team 1	Score	Team 2
Juventus (Italy)	3–1	(Israel) Kiryat Gat
Paris FC (France)	0–0 (4–5 p)	(Italy) Roma

===== Round 2 =====
Team 1	Agg.	Team 2	1st leg	2nd leg
HB Køge (Denmark)	1–3	(Italy) Juventus	1–1	0–2
Sparta Prague (Czech Republic)	2–6	(Italy) Roma	1–2	1–4

==== Group stage ====
===== Group B =====
Pos	Team	Pld	W	D	L	GF	GA	GD	Pts	Qualification	WOL	ROM	PÖL	PRA
1	(Germany) VfL Wolfsburg	6	4	2	0	19	5	+14	14	Advance to Quarter-finals	—	4–2	4–0	0–0
2	(Italy) Roma	6	4	1	1	16	8	+8	13	Advance to Quarter-finals	1–1	—	5–0	1–0
3	(Austria) St. Pölten	6	1	1	4	7	22	−15	4		2–8	3–4	—	1–1
4	(Czech Republic) Slavia Prague	6	0	2	4	1	8	−7	2		0–2	0–3	0–1	—

Source: UEFA

===== Group C =====
Pos	Team	Pld	W	D	L	GF	GA	GD	Pts	Qualification	ARS	LYO	JUV	ZÜR
1	(England) Arsenal	6	4	1	1	19	5	+14	13	Advance to Quarter-finals	—	0–1	1–0	3–1
2	(France) Lyon	6	3	2	1	10	6	+4	11	Advance to Quarter-finals	1–5	—	0–0	4–0
3	(Italy) Juventus	6	2	3	1	9	3	+6	9		1–1	1–1	—	5–0
4	(Switzerland) Zürich	6	0	0	6	2	26	−24	0		1–9	0–3	0–2	—

Source: UEFA

==== Knockout phase ====
===== Quarter-finals =====
Team 1	Agg.	Team 2	1st leg	2nd leg
Roma (Italy)	1–6	(Spain) Barcelona	0–1	1–5
