= Moreirense F.C. =

Portuguese professional football club

Moreirense
- Full name: Moreirense Futebol Clube
- Nicknames: Os verdes e brancos (The Green and whites); Os homens de Moreira de Cónegos (The Men from Moreira de Cónegos)
- Founded: 1 November 1938; 87 years ago
- Stadium: Parque de Jogos Comendador Joaquim de Almeida Freitas
- Capacity: 6,150
- Owner: Black Knight Football Club (70%)
- President: Vítor Magalhães
- Head coach: Vasco Botelho da Costa
- League: Primeira Liga
- 2025–26: Primeira Liga, 7th of 18
- Website: www.moreirensefc.pt
| Home colours | Away colours | Third colours |

Moreirense Futebol Clube (Portuguese pronunciation: [muɾɐjˈɾẽsɨ futɨˈβɔl ˈkluβɨ]) is a Portuguese professional football club based in Moreira de Cónegos, Guimarães Municipality, Minho. Founded on 1 November 1938, it plays in the Primeira Liga, holding home games at Parque de Jogos Comendador Joaquim de Almeida Freitas, with a capacity for 6,150 spectators.

The team first played in the second tier in 1995 and the Primeira Liga in 2002. It won the Taça da Liga in 2017 and the second division championship in 2014 and 2023.

== History ==
Moreirense was founded in 1938. It first reached the Liga de Honra in 1995, where they stayed five seasons. After being relegated to Segunda Divisão, manager Manuel Machado took the team and, in two years, managed two promotions, getting the team for the first time to the top flight. He led the northerners for two more seasons, in which Moreirense achieved two mid-table positions, finishing ninth in the latter season.

After Machado departed for neighbouring Vitória de Guimarães, the club suffered two consecutive relegations, only returning again to the second level in 2010, and the first in 2012. After an immediate relegation, the team won the 2013–14 Segunda Liga under manager Toni Conceição.

Moreirense achieved its first top level national title on 29 January 2017, winning the League Cup (Taça da Liga) by defeating S.C. Braga in the final.

In 2018–19, manager Ivo Vieira led Moreirense to a best-ever sixth place, missing out on the fifth place only on goal difference to Vitória de Guimarães, who Vieira left the club for. Following two 8th-place finishes, the team were relegated in 2021–22, a season in which they had three managers: João Henriques, Lito Vidigal and Ricardo Sá Pinto. Relegation was confirmed with a 2–1 aggregate playoff loss to G.D. Chaves.

Under Paulo Alves, Moreirense instantly returned to the top flight by winning the 2022–23 Liga Portugal 2. The team took 79 points from a possible 102, the highest in an 18-team season of the league, and the highest percentage taken from any season of it. Alves left at the end of the season.

== Honours ==
=== National ===
- Taça da Liga
  - Winners: 2016–17
- Segunda Liga
  - Winners: 2001–02, 2013–14, 2022—23
- Portuguese Second Division
  - Winners: 1994–95, 2000–01

=== Regional ===
- AF Braga Second Division
  - Winners: 1942–43

== Recent league history ==
| Season | Div. | Pos. | Pl. | W | D | L | GS | GA | P | Cup | League Cup | Notes |
|---|---|---|---|---|---|---|---|---|---|---|---|---|
| 1999–2000 | 2H | 16 | 34 | 6 | 11 | 17 | 29 | 49 | 29 | Semi-final | Not held | Relegated |
| 2000–01 | 2DN | 1 | 38 | 23 | 8 | 7 | 62 | 31 | 77 | Quarter-final | Not held | Promoted |
| 2001–02 | 2H | 1 | 34 | 19 | 7 | 8 | 55 | 35 | 64 | Last 32 | Not held | Promoted |
| 2002–03 | 1D | 12 | 34 | 9 | 12 | 13 | 42 | 46 | 39 | Last 32 | Not held | |
| 2003–04 | 1D | 9 | 34 | 12 | 10 | 12 | 33 | 33 | 46 | Last 16 | Not held | |
| 2004–05 | 1D | 16 | 34 | 7 | 13 | 14 | 30 | 43 | 34 | Last 32 | Not held | Relegated |
| 2005–06 | 2H | 13 | 34 | 11 | 9 | 14 | 36 | 37 | 42 | Last 128 | Not held | Relegated |
| 2006–07 | 2DN | 3 | 26 | 12 | 9 | 5 | 30 | 20 | 45 | 3rd round | Not held | |
| 2007–08 | 2DN | 8 | 26 | 11 | 6 | 9 | 33 | 25 | 39 | Quarter-final | Not entered | |
| 2008–09 | 2DN | 3 | 22 | 11 | 4 | 7 | 30 | 19 | 37 | First round | Not entered | |
| 2009–10 | 2DN | 1 | 28 | 21 | 3 | 4 | 49 | 19 | 66 | Last 128 | Not entered | Promoted |
| 2010–11 | 2H | 7 | 30 | 10 | 10 | 10 | 36 | 41 | 40 | Last 32 | First Group Stage | |
| 2011–12 | 2H | 2 | 30 | 15 | 7 | 8 | 47 | 32 | 52 | Quarter-final | Second Group Stage | Promoted |
| 2012–13 | 1D | 15 | 30 | 5 | 9 | 16 | 30 | 51 | 24 | Last 32 | Second Group Stage | Relegated |
| 2013–14 | 2D | 1 | 42 | 21 | 16 | 5 | 65 | 25 | 40 | Last 32 | Second Group Stage | Promoted |
| 2014–15 | 1D | 11 | 34 | 11 | 10 | 13 | 33 | 42 | 43 | Last 32 | Second Group Stage | |
| 2015–16 | 1D | 12 | 34 | 9 | 9 | 16 | 38 | 54 | 36 | Last 64 | Second Group Stage | |
| 2016–17 | 1D | 15 | 34 | 8 | 9 | 17 | 33 | 48 | 33 | Last 64 | Winners | |
| 2017–18 | 1D | 15 | 34 | 8 | 8 | 18 | 29 | 50 | 32 | Last 8 | Third Round | |
| 2018–19 | 1D | 6 | 34 | 16 | 4 | 14 | 39 | 44 | 52 | Last 16 | Second Round | |
| 2019–20 | 1D | 8 | 34 | 10 | 13 | 11 | 42 | 44 | 43 | Last 32 | Second Round | |
| 2020–21 | 1D | 8 | 34 | 10 | 13 | 11 | 37 | 43 | 43 | Last 16 | | |

== Players ==
=== Current squad ===
As of 6 September 2026

Note: Flags indicate national team as defined under FIFA eligibility rules; some limited exceptions apply. Players may hold more than one non-FIFA nationality.

| No. | Pos. | Nation | Player |
|---|---|---|---|
| 1 | GK | BRA | Aranha (on loan from Palmeiras) |
| 2 | DF | POR | Leandro |
| 4 | DF | BRA | Kevyn Monteiro |
| 7 | MF | POR | Manuel Mendonça |
| 8 | MF | SRB | Mateja Stjepanović |
| 9 | FW | MTQ | Alexandre Parsemain |
| 10 | FW | POR | Kiko Bondoso (vice-captain) |
| 11 | FW | BRA | Landerson |
| 13 | GK | POR | André Ferreira |
| 17 | DF | ESP | Álvaro Martínez |
| 19 | FW | POR | Tiago Andrade |
| 20 | MF | POR | João Veloso (on loan from Benfica) |
| 21 | MF | ESP | Rodri |
| 23 | MF | ENG | Nile John |
| 25 | MF | POR | Afonso Assis |

| No. | Pos. | Nation | Player |
|---|---|---|---|
| 26 | DF | BRA | Maracás |
| 27 | DF | POR | Kiko (3rd captain) |
| 28 | MF | ZAM | Chipyoka Songa |
| 30 | MF | ENG | Jimi Gower |
| 31 | DF | BRA | Pedro Jesus |
| 32 | DF | BRA | Janderson |
| 44 | MF | ESP | Michael Dacosta |
| 65 | MF | BRA | Guilherme Liberato |
| 66 | DF | GBS | Gilberto Batista |
| 76 | DF | POR | Dinis Pinto (captain) |
| 77 | FW | ENG | Koby Mottoh |
| 79 | FW | CRO | Leonardo Vonić (on loan from Porto B) |
| 89 | FW | POR | Afonso Vieira |
| 99 | FW | BRA | Yan Maranhão |

=== Out on loan ===
Note: Flags indicate national team as defined under FIFA eligibility rules; some limited exceptions apply. Players may hold more than one non-FIFA nationality.

| No. | Pos. | Nation | Player |
|---|---|---|---|
| — | DF | BRA | Fabiano (at Vitória until 30 June 2027) |

== Managerial history ==
- (Portugal) Armindo Cunha (1991–92)
- (Portugal) Ferreirinha (1993–94)
- (Portugal) Carlos Garcia (1994 – May 30, 1999)
- (Portugal) Bernardino Pedroto (May 30, 1999 – Dec 9, 1999)
- (Portugal) João Cavaleiro (Dec 9, 1999 – May 14, 2000)
- (Portugal) Manuel Machado (June 2, 2000 – June 5, 2004)
- (Portugal) Vítor Oliveira (June 7, 2004 – April 3, 2005)
- (Portugal) Jorge Jesus (April 5, 2005 – May 22, 2005)
- (Portugal) Vítor Paneira (May 23, 2005 – Oct 17, 2005)
- (Portugal) João Carlos Pereira (Oct 17, 2005 – Feb 27, 2006)
- (Portugal) José Gomes (March 1, 2006 – May 5, 2006)
- (Portugal) Dito (June 15, 2006 – Nov 13, 2007)
- (Portugal) Daniel Ramos (Nov 13, 2007 – May 4, 2008)
- (Portugal) Nicolau Vaqueiro (2008 – May 12, 2009)
- (Portugal) Jorge Casquilha (2009 – Jan 30, 2013)
- (Portugal) Augusto Inácio (Jan 30, 2013 – May 19, 2013)
- (Portugal) Vítor Oliveira (May 20, 2013 – March 10, 2014)
- (Portugal) Toni Conceição (March 10, 2014 – May 15, 2014)
- (Portugal) Miguel Leal (July 1, 2014 – May 19, 2016)
- (Portugal) Pepa (May 20, 2016 – November 21, 2016)
- (Portugal) Leandro Mendes (November 22, 2016 – November 28, 2016)
- (Portugal) Augusto Inácio (November 28, 2016 – March 20, 2017)
- (Portugal) Petit (March 20, 2017 – May 26, 2017)
- (Portugal) Manuel Machado (May 27, 2017 – October 28, 2017)
- (Portugal) Sérgio Vieira (October 31, 2017 – February 13, 2018)
- (Portugal) Petit (February 12, 2018 – May 13, 2018)
- (Portugal) Ivo Vieira (May 29, 2018 – May 19, 2019)
- (Portugal) Vítor Campelos (May 27, 2019 – December 16, 2019)
- (Portugal) Ricardo Soares (December 18, 2019 – November 9, 2020)
- (Portugal) César Peixoto (November 10, 2020 - January 2, 2021)
- (Portugal) Vasco Seabra (January 6, 2021 – June 5, 2021)
- (Portugal) João Henriques (June 5, 2021 – December 2, 2021)
- (Angola) Lito Vidigal (December 4, 2021 – January 5, 2022)
- (Portugal) Ricardo Sá Pinto (January 7, 2022 – May 31, 2022)
- (Portugal) Paulo Alves (June 8, 2022 – June 30, 2023)
- (Portugal) Rui Borges (July 5, 2023 – present)
