= 2022–23 UEFA Youth League knockout phase =

European football tournament

The 2022–23 UEFA Youth League knockout phase began on 7 February 2023 with the play-off round and concluded with the final on 24 April 2023 at Stade de Genève in Geneva, Switzerland, to decide the champions of the 2022–23 UEFA Youth League.

The semi-finals and final had traditionally been played at the Colovray Stadium in Nyon since the first edition, but for the 2022–23 edition they were moved to the Stade de Genève due to increased interest in the tournament from the supporters of the participating clubs. All matches were played across 90 minutes and a penalty shoot-out if necessary.

Times are CET/CEST, (Note: CET (UTC+1) for dates up to 26 March 2023 (up to quarter-finals), and CEST (UTC+2) for dates thereafter (semi-finals and final).) as listed by UEFA (local times, if different, are in parentheses).

== Qualified teams ==
Group	Winners (enter round of 16)	Runners-up (enter play-offs as away team)
A	(England) Liverpool	(Netherlands) Ajax
B	(Spain) Atlético Madrid	(Portugal) Porto
C	(Spain) Barcelona	(Italy) Inter Milan
D	(Portugal) Sporting CP	(Germany) Eintracht Frankfurt
E	(Italy) Milan	(Austria) Red Bull Salzburg
F	(Spain) Real Madrid	(Ukraine) Shakhtar Donetsk
G	(England) Manchester City	(Germany) Borussia Dortmund
H	(France) Paris Saint-Germain	(Italy) Juventus

=== Domestic Champions Path ===
Second round winners
(enter play-offs as home team)
(Netherlands) AZ
(Scotland) Hibernian
(Switzerland) Young Boys
(Belgium) Genk
(Greece) Panathinaikos
(Croatia) Hajduk Split
(Ukraine) Rukh Lviv
(Hungary) MTK Budapest

== Schedule ==
Knockout phase schedule
Phase	Round	Draw date	Match dates
Knockout phase	Knockout round play-offs	8 November 2022	7–8 February 2023
Knockout phase	Round of 16	13 February 2023	28 February – 1 March 2023
Knockout phase	Quarter-finals	13 February 2023	14–15 March 2023
Knockout phase	Semi-finals	13 February 2023	21 April 2023 at Stade de Genève, Geneva
Knockout phase	Final	13 February 2023	24 April 2023 at Stade de Genève, Geneva

== Bracket ==
Knockout round play-offs
(Hungary) MTK Budapest	0
(Netherlands) Ajax	1
(Greece) Panathinaikos	0
(Portugal) Porto	1
(Netherlands) AZ	5
(Germany) Eintracht Frankfurt	0
(Switzerland) Young Boys	2
(Austria) Red Bull Salzburg	3
(Scotland) Hibernian	1
(Germany) Borussia Dortmund	2
(Croatia) Hajduk Split	1
(Ukraine) Shakhtar Donetsk	0
(Ukraine) Rukh Lviv (p)	1 (4)
(Italy) Inter Milan	1 (3)
(Belgium) Genk (p)	0 (4)
(Italy) Juventus	0 (3)

Round of 16
(Portugal) Sporting CP	5
(Netherlands) Ajax	1
(England) Liverpool (p)	1 (6)
(Portugal) Porto	1 (5)
(Spain) Barcelona	0
(Netherlands) AZ	3
(Spain) Real Madrid	3
(Austria) Red Bull Salzburg	1
(Germany) Borussia Dortmund (p)	1 (5)
(France) Paris Saint-Germain	1 (4)
(Croatia) Hajduk Split	2
(England) Manchester City	1
(Italy) Milan	1
(Ukraine) Rukh Lviv	0
(Spain) Atlético Madrid	4
(Belgium) Genk	1

Quarter-finals
(Portugal) Sporting CP	1
(England) Liverpool	0
(Netherlands) AZ	4
(Spain) Real Madrid	0
(Germany) Borussia Dortmund	1 (8)
(Croatia) Hajduk Split (p)	1 (9)
(Italy) Milan	2
(Spain) Atlético Madrid	0

Semi-finals
21 April – Geneva
(Portugal) Sporting CP	2 (3)
(Netherlands) AZ (p)	2 (4)
21 April – Geneva
(Croatia) Hajduk Split	3
(Italy) Milan	1

Final
24 April – Geneva
(Netherlands) AZ	5
(Croatia) Hajduk Split	0

== Knockout round play-offs ==
=== Summary ===
The eight second round winners from the Domestic Champions Path were drawn against the eight group runners-up from the UEFA Champions League Path, with the teams from the Domestic Champions Path hosting the match. Teams from the same association could not be drawn against each other.

The draw was conducted on 8 November 2022 at the UEFA headquarters in Nyon. The knockout round play-offs were played over one leg on 7 and 8 February 2023.

Home team	Score	Away team
Young Boys (Switzerland)	2–3	(Austria) Red Bull Salzburg
AZ (Netherlands)	5–0	(Germany) Eintracht Frankfurt
Rukh Lviv (Ukraine)	1–1 (4–3 p)	(Italy) Inter Milan
Hajduk Split (Croatia)	1–0	(Ukraine) Shakhtar Donetsk
MTK Budapest (Hungary)	0–1	(Netherlands) Ajax
Hibernian (Scotland)	1–2	(Germany) Borussia Dortmund
Panathinaikos (Greece)	0–1	(Portugal) Porto
Genk (Belgium)	0–0 (4–3 p)	(Italy) Juventus

=== Matches ===
7 February 2023
18:00

Young Boys (Switzerland)	2–3	(Austria) Red Bull Salzburg
Amenda 9' (pen.); Lüthi 56'	Report	Hofer 62'; Yeo 84'; Jano 90+4'

Stadion Wankdorf, Bern
Attendance: 1,150
Referee: Joey Kooij (Netherlands)

8 February 2023
18:00

AZ (Netherlands)	5–0	(Germany) Eintracht Frankfurt
Meerdink 3', 31', 75'; Poku 71'; Addai 90' (pen.)	Report

AZ Training Centre, Wijdewormer
Attendance: 675
Referee: Igor Pajac (Croatia)

8 February 2023
14:00

Rukh Lviv (Ukraine)	1–1	(Italy) Inter Milan
Panchenko 30'	Report	Esposito 52'
Penalties
Kitela (penalty missed); Slyubyk (penalty scored); Pidhurskyi (penalty scored); Kvas (penalty missed); Sapuha (penalty scored); Roman (penalty scored)	4–3	(penalty missed) Iliev; (penalty scored) Curatolo; (penalty scored) Esposito; (penalty scored) Carboni; (penalty missed) Fontanarosa; (penalty missed) Stanković

Subcarpathian Football Center, Stalowa Wola, Poland (Note: Due to the Russian invasion of Ukraine, Ukrainian teams were required to play their home matches at neutral venues until further notice.)
Attendance: 370
Referee: Elchin Masiyev (Azerbaijan)

8 February 2023
18:00

Hajduk Split (Croatia)	1–0	(Ukraine) Shakhtar Donetsk
Vušković 82'	Report

Stadion Poljud, Split
Attendance: 1,000
Referee: Damian Sylwestrzak (Poland)

8 February 2023
18:00

MTK Budapest (Hungary)	0–1	(Netherlands) Ajax
	Report	Misehouy 59' (pen.)

Hidegkuti Nándor Stadion, Budapest
Attendance: 3,324
Referee: Joonas Jaanovits (Estonia)

7 February 2023
20:00 (19:00 UTC+0)

Hibernian (Scotland)	1–2	(Germany) Borussia Dortmund
Blaney 26'	Report	Rijkhoff 70' (pen.); Blank 90'

Easter Road, Edinburgh
Attendance: 7,729
Referee: Henrik Nalbandyan (Armenia)

8 February 2023
18:00 (19:00 UTC+3)

Panathinaikos (Greece)	0–1	(Portugal) Porto
	Report	Meireles 71'

Leoforos Alexandras Stadium, Athens
Attendance: 1,699
Referee: Amine Kourgheli (Belarus)

8 February 2023
16:00

Genk (Belgium)	0–0	(Italy) Juventus
	Report
Penalties
Van De Perre (penalty missed); Al Mazyani (penalty scored); Martens (penalty scored); Smekens (penalty scored); Chambaere (penalty scored)	4–3	(penalty missed) Anghelè; (penalty scored) Savona; (penalty scored) Maressa; (penalty scored) Bonetti; (penalty missed) Yıldız

Cegeka Arena - Stadium B, Genk
Attendance: 1,218
Referee: Miloš Milanović (Serbia)

== Round of 16 ==
=== Summary ===
The draw was conducted on 13 February 2023 at 13:00 CET in the UEFA headquarters in Nyon. The round of 16 was played over one leg on 28 February and 1 March 2023.

Home team	Score	Away team
Milan (Italy)	1–0	(Ukraine) Rukh Lviv
Barcelona (Spain)	0–3	(Netherlands) AZ
Liverpool (England)	1–1 (6–5 p)	(Portugal) Porto
Atlético Madrid (Spain)	4–1	(Belgium) Genk
Borussia Dortmund (Germany)	1–1 (5–4 p)	(France) Paris Saint-Germain
Hajduk Split (Croatia)	2–1	(England) Manchester City
Sporting CP (Portugal)	5–1	(Netherlands) Ajax
Real Madrid (Spain)	3–1	(Austria) Red Bull Salzburg

=== Matches ===
28 February 2023
15:00

Milan (Italy)	1–0	(Ukraine) Rukh Lviv
Zeroli 85'	Report

Centro Sportivo Vismara, Milan
Attendance: 350
Referee: Christian-Petru Ciochirca (Austria)

1 March 2023
16:00

Barcelona (Spain)	0–3	(Netherlands) AZ
	Report	Smit 56'; Meerdink 63', 90+1'

Johan Cruyff Stadium, Sant Joan Despí
Attendance: 898
Referee: Ondřej Berka (Czech Republic)

1 March 2023
17:30

Liverpool (England)	1–1	(Portugal) Porto
Frauendorf 55'	Report	Meireles 8' (pen.)
Penalties
Doak (penalty missed); Clark (penalty scored); Jonas (penalty scored); Corness (penalty scored); Danns (penalty scored); Gift (penalty scored); Stephenson (penalty scored)	6–5	(penalty scored) Meireles; (penalty scored) Fernandes; (penalty scored) Rodrigues; (penalty scored) Regal; (penalty missed) Diaz; (penalty scored) Bras; (penalty missed) Candé

Liverpool FC Academy Training Ground, Kirkby
Attendance: 201
Referee: Helgi Mikael Jónasson (Iceland)

1 March 2023
19:00

Atlético Madrid (Spain)	4–1	(Belgium) Genk
Niño 4' (pen.); Raihani 28'; Santamaría 32'; Boñar 39'	Report	Díaz 60' (o.g.)

Metropolitano Stadium, Madrid
Attendance: 11,503
Referee: Chrysovalantis Theouli (Cyprus)

28 February 2023
16:00

Borussia Dortmund (Germany)	1–1	(France) Paris Saint-Germain
Bamba 41'	Report	Lemina 39'
Penalties
Cisse (penalty scored); Rijkhoff (penalty scored); Ludwig (penalty scored); Campbell (penalty scored); Bamba (penalty scored)	5–4	(penalty scored) El Hannach; (penalty scored) Zague; (penalty scored) Bikouta; (penalty scored) Gharbi; (penalty missed) Housni

Dortmund Brackel Training Ground, Dortmund
Attendance: 1,473
Referee: Goga Kikacheishvili (Georgia)

28 February 2023
14:00

Hajduk Split (Croatia)	2–1	(England) Manchester City
Brajković 24'; Antunović 33'	Report	Bobb 45'

Stadion Poljud, Split
Attendance: 8,000
Referee: Snir Levy (Israel)

1 March 2023
13:00

Sporting CP (Portugal)	5–1	(Netherlands) Ajax
Issahaku 36', 73', 79'; Ribeiro 75'; Mateus 86'	Report	Gooijer 87'

Stadium Aurélio Pereira, Alcochete
Attendance: 442
Referee: Matthew De Gabriele (Malta)

1 March 2023
14:00

Real Madrid (Spain)	3–1	(Austria) Red Bull Salzburg
Fortuny 46'; Ramón 62'; Bravo 90+4'	Report	Konaté 30' (pen.)

Alfredo Di Stéfano, Madrid
Attendance: 961
Referee: Marian Alexandru Barbu (Romania)

== Quarter-finals ==
=== Summary ===
The draw was conducted on 13 February 2023 at 13:00 CET in the UEFA headquarters in Nyon. The quarter-finals were played over one leg on 14 and 15 March 2023.

Home team	Score	Away team
AZ (Netherlands)	4–0	(Spain) Real Madrid
Milan (Italy)	2–0	(Spain) Atlético Madrid
Sporting CP (Portugal)	1–0	(England) Liverpool
Borussia Dortmund (Germany)	1–1 (8–9 p)	(Croatia) Hajduk Split

=== Matches ===
15 March 2023
14:00

AZ (Netherlands)	4–0	(Spain) Real Madrid
Beukers 25', 85'; Poku 29'; Meerdink 78'	Report

AZ Training Centre, Wijdewormer
Attendance: 2,000
Referee: Adam Ladebäck (Sweden)

14 March 2023
16:00

Milan (Italy)	2–0	(Spain) Atlético Madrid
Stalmach 12'; El Hilali 67'	Report

Centro Sportivo Vismara, Milan
Attendance: 655
Referee: Sebastian Gishamer (Austria)

14 March 2023
14:00

Sporting CP (Portugal)	1–0	(England) Liverpool
Ribeiro 65'	Report

Stadium Aurélio Pereira, Alcochete
Attendance: 874
Referee: Gergo Bogár (Hungary)

15 March 2023
18:30

Borussia Dortmund (Germany)	1–1	(Croatia) Hajduk Split
Rijkhoff 76' (pen.)	Report	Antunović 72'
Penalties
Cissé (penalty scored); Rijkhoff (penalty scored); Ludwig (penalty scored); Gürpüz (penalty scored); Brunner (penalty scored); Kamara (penalty scored); Bamba (penalty scored); Collins (penalty scored); Mané (penalty missed)	8–9	(penalty scored) Vrcić; (penalty scored) Ćalušić; (penalty scored) Jurić-Petrašilo; (penalty scored) Skoko; (penalty scored) Capan; (penalty scored) Nazor; (penalty scored) Arković; (penalty scored) Đolonga; (penalty scored) Kavelj

Westfalenstadion, Dortmund
Attendance: 16,000
Referee: Robert Ian Jenkins (Wales)

== Semi-finals ==
=== Summary ===
The draw was conducted on 13 February 2023 at 13:00 CET in the UEFA headquarters in Nyon. The semi-finals were played over one leg on 21 April 2023. All four teams were qualified to the semi-finals for the first time ever, ensuring a fourth different champions in a row.

Team 1	Score	Team 2
Sporting CP (Portugal)	2–2 (3–4 p)	(Netherlands) AZ
Hajduk Split (Croatia)	3–1	(Italy) Milan

=== Matches ===
21 April 2023
13:00

Sporting CP (Portugal)	2–2	(Netherlands) AZ
Cabral 9'; Lamba 48' (pen.)	Report	Poku 30'; Daal 36'
Penalties
Muniz (penalty scored); Moreira (penalty scored); Lamba (penalty missed); Ribeiro (penalty missed); Nel (penalty scored)	3–4	(penalty scored) Goes; (penalty scored) Smit; (penalty missed) De Jong; (penalty scored) Kwakman; (penalty scored) Addai

Stade de Genève, Geneva
Attendance: 1,839
Referee: Manfredas Lukjančukas (Lithuania)

21 April 2023
18:00

Hajduk Split (Croatia)	3–1	(Italy) Milan
Vrcić 51'; Pukštas 69'; Hrgović 76'	Report	Zeroli 83'

Stade de Genève, Geneva
Attendance: 7,597
Referee: Rohit Saggi (Norway)

== Final ==
The final was played on 24 April 2023 at Stade de Genève, Geneva.

24 April 2023
18:00

AZ (Netherlands)	5–0	(Croatia) Hajduk Split
Addai 45' (pen.); Poku 70', 76'; Meerdink 79', 87'	Report

Stade de Genève, Geneva
Attendance: 9,390
Referee: Willy Delajod (France)
