= Álvaro Martínez (footballer, born 2002) =

Spanish footballer (born 2002)

Personal information
- Full name: Álvaro Martínez Navarro
- Date of birth: 4 May 2002 (age 24)
- Place of birth: La Vall d'Uixó, Spain
- Height: 1.81 m (5 ft 11 in)
- Position: Left back

Team information
- Current team: Moreirense
- Number: 17

Youth career
- Villarreal
- 2018–2019: Castellón
- 2019–2021: Betis
- 2019–2020: → Calavera (loan)

Senior career*
Years	Team	Apps	(Gls)
2021–2023	Betis B	47	(0)
2021	→ Lleida (loan)	12	(0)
2023–2025	Cultural Leonesa	67	(0)
2025–	Moreirense	15	(0)
- * Club domestic league appearances and goals as of 17:42, 13 October 2026 (UTC)

Álvaro Martínez Navarro (born 4 May 2002) is a Spanish professional footballer who plays as a left back for Portuguese club Moreirense.

== Career ==
Born in La Vall d'Uixó, Martínez began playing as a youth for local Villarreal and Castellón before joining Real Betis in 2019. For 2021–22, he was loaned to Lleida for his first senior experience, in the fourth-tier Segunda Federación. Halfway through the campaign, he was recalled by Betis for the reserve team, who ended up relegated from the Primera Federación.

In July 2023, Martínez moved on a two-year deal to Cultural Leonesa, in the third tier. In his second season, he played 39 games in all competitions and assisted three goals as the club won promotion to the Segunda División.

On 16 June 2025, Martínez signed a three-year deal at Moreirense in Portugal's Primeira Liga. He was sent off against Gil Vicente on 7 February 2026, and missed six games through a left thigh injury from March to April. After playing 16 games in his first season, he found himself out of contention at the start of his second.
