= Gilberto Batista =

Bissau-Guinean footballer (born 2000)

Personal information
- Full name: Gilberto Dambi Batista
- Date of birth: 29 December 2003 (age 22)
- Place of birth: Bissau, Guinea-Bissau
- Height: 1.87 m (6 ft 2 in)
- Position: Centre-back

Team information
- Current team: Moreirense
- Number: 66

Youth career
- 2015–2016: Academia de Platine
- 2016–2021: Sporting CP

Senior career*
Years	Team	Apps	(Gls)
2021–2023	Sporting CP B	24	(0)
2023–	Moreirense	45	(0)

International career^{‡}
2022–2023	Portugal U20	3	(0)
2025–	Guinea-Bissau	2	(0)
- * Club domestic league appearances and goals as of 19:31, 17 October 2026 (UTC) ‡ National team caps and goals as of 19:31, 17 October 2026 (UTC)

Gilberto Dambi Batista (born 29 December 2003) is a professional footballer who plays as a centre-back for Primeira Liga club Moreirense and the Guinea-Bissau national team.

== Career ==
A youth product of the Bissau-Guinean club Academia de Platine, Batista moved to Portugal with Sporting CP in 2016 where he finished his development. On 6 January 2020, he signed his first professional contract with Sporting. He was promoted to their reserves on the Liga 3 in 2021, and on 19 July 2023 again extended his contract with the club until 2025. On 22 June 2023, he transferred to Moreirense in the Primeira Liga on a contract until 2026. On 16 December 2024, he extended his contract with Moreirense until 2027.

== International career ==
Born in Guinea-Bissau, Batista moved to Portugal at a young age and is a dual-citizen. In November 2022, he was called up to the Portugal U20s for a set of friendlies. He was called up to the senior Guinea-Bissau national football team for a set of 2026 FIFA World Cup qualification matches in March 2025. He debuted in a 2–1 loss to Burkina Faso on 24 March 2024.

== Career statistics ==
=== International ===
As of match played 6 June 2025

Appearances and goals by national team and year
National team	Year	Apps	Goals
Guinea-Bissau
Guinea-Bissau	2025	2	0
Total		2	0
