= Mehdi Loune =

Moroccan footballer (born 2004)

Personal information
- Date of birth: 14 May 2004 (age 22)
- Place of birth: Hanau, Germany
- Height: 1.72 m (5 ft 8 in)
- Position: Midfielder

Team information
- Current team: Alemannia Aachen
- Number: 10

Senior career*
Years	Team	Apps	(Gls)
2022–2025	Eintracht Frankfurt II	48	(11)
2025–	Alemannia Aachen	26	(5)

International career^{‡}
2019–2020	Germany U16	4	(0)
2021	Morocco U20	1	(0)
2021	Germany U18	4	(0)
- * Club domestic league appearances and goals as of 28 May 2026 ‡ National team caps and goals as of 17 December 2021

Mehdi Loune (Arabic: مهدي لون; born 14 May 2004) is a footballer who plays as a midfielder for 3. Liga club Alemannia Aachen. Born in Germany, he represented both Morocco and Germany on youth international levels.

== Early life ==
Loune is a native of Hanau, Germany. He started playing football at the age of three.

== Club career ==
As a youth player, Loune joined the youth academy of German side FSV Frankfurt. After that, he joined the under-16 team of German Bundesliga side Eintracht Frankfurt. He suffered a torn cruciate ligament while playing for the club in 2023 and 2024.

== International career ==
Loune represented Morocco and Germany internationally at youth level. He played for the Morocco national under-20 football team at the 2021 Arab Cup U-20. Previously, he captained Germany internationally at youth level.

== Style of play ==
Loune mainly operates as a midfielder. He is known for his technical ability.

== Personal life ==
Loune has two brothers. He is the son of a football manager father.
