= Enrique Herrero (footballer, born 2005) =

Spanish footballer (born 2005)

Personal information
- Full name: Juan Enrique Herrero García
- Date of birth: 28 January 2005 (age 21)
- Place of birth: Lorquí, Spain
- Height: 1.73 m (5 ft 8 in)
- Position: Forward

Team information
- Current team: Real Madrid C
- Number: 16

Youth career
- 2011–2017: Lorquí
- 2017–2021: Villarreal
- 2020–2021: Roda
- 2023–: Real Madrid Juvenil A
- 2022–2023: Real Madrid Juvenil B
- 2023–2024: → Elche Juvenil A (loan)

Senior career*
| Years | Team | Apps | (Gls) |
| 2021–2022 | Eintracht Frankfurt | 0 | (0) |
| 2024–2025 | → Navalcarnero (loan) | 31 | (7) |
| 2025– | Real Madrid C | 0 | (0) |

International career^{‡}
| 2020 | Spain U15 | 3 | (3) |
| 2021 | Spain U17 | 2 | (0) |
| 2022 | Spain U18 | 2 | (0) |
- * Club domestic league appearances and goals as of 16:36, 11 September 2025 (UTC) ‡ National team caps and goals as of 11 October 2022

Juan Enrique Herrero García (born 28 January 2005) is a Spanish footballer who plays as a forward for Real Madrid C.

== Club career ==
Herrero was born in 2005 in Lorquí in the Region of Murcia. He began playing at Roda, and was top scorer and player of the tournament in a national under-12 seven-a-side tournament, now known as La Liga Promises. In 2020, he moved to Villarreal.

In July 2021, Herrero turned down a contract extension at Villarreal and moved to Eintracht Frankfurt on a four-year deal, after being pursued by Barcelona, Real Madrid and Juventus. Having not settled in Germany, he returned to his country in March 2022 by signing for Real Madrid, though he was not able to play for the rest of the season due to moving outside the transfer window.

After spending the preceding season on loan to Elche's youth team, Herrero signed for Navalcarnero of the fourth-tier Segunda Federación in August 2024.

== International career ==
As of 2021, Herrero had played for Spain at under-15 and under-17 level.

== Style of play ==
Herrero was described by Jorge Calabrés in El Español in 2022 as "the best Spanish striker of his generation". He mainly operates as a striker and has received comparisons to Spain international Raúl.
