= Katarina Pranješ =

Croatian footballer (born 2002)

Personal information
- Date of birth: 7 October 2002 (age 24)
- Position: Defender

Team information
- Current team: Split

Senior career*
Years	Team	Apps	(Gls)
- Osijek
- Split

International career^{‡}
2018	Croatia U16	3	(1)
2018	Croatia U17	2	(0)
2019–2020	Croatia U19	7	(1)
2020–	Croatia	1	(0)
- * Club domestic league appearances and goals ‡ National team caps and goals as of 23 February 2021.

Katarina Pranješ (born 7 October 2002) is a Croatian footballer who plays as a defender for Women's First League club ŽNK Split and the Croatia women's national team.

== Club career ==
Pranješ has played for ŽNK Osijek and Split in Croatia.

== International career ==
Pranješ made her senior debut for Croatia at senior level on 27 November 2020 as an 89th-minute substitution in a 1–0 home win over Lithuania during the UEFA Women's Euro 2022 qualifying.

== International goals ==
No.	Date	Venue	Opponent	Score	Result	Competition
1.	13 November 2022	Dalga Arena, Baku, Azerbaijan	Azerbaijan	1–1	1–2	Friendly
