= Dennis Curatolo =

Italian footballer (born 2004)

Personal information
- Date of birth: 3 April 2004 (age 22)
- Place of birth: Como, Italy
- Position: Centre-forward

Team information
- Current team: Pro Patria

Youth career
- Inter Milan

Senior career*
Years	Team	Apps	(Gls)
2022–2024	Inter Milan	0	(0)
2023–2024	→ Fermana (loan)	19	(1)
2024	→ Pro Patria (loan)	11	(0)
2024–	Pro Patria	16	(1)
- * Club domestic league appearances and goals as of 13 December 2024

Dennis Curatolo (born 3 April 2004) is an Italian professional footballer who plays as a centre-forward for Serie D club Pro Patria.

== Club career ==
Born in Como, Lombardy, Dennis Curatolo played all his youth football at Inter Milan.

During his time in Inter's Academy, he proved to be a prolific goalscorer for the youth teams, with a total of 47 goals from the under-13s to the under-18s by March 2022, most notably during the Torneo di Viareggio.

Early 2022, as his good form in the Under-18 league had already warranted him a step-up to the Primavera, he was first called by Simone Inzaghi to the first team, as he appeared on the bench during a 2–1 Serie A victory to Lazio in January, and in the following Milan derby, however not making his debut on either occasions.

The following season, as he had scored his first European goal in the Youth League, he was again called to the first team by Inzaghi, as both strikers Lukaku and Correa were injured. Curatolo appeared on the bench again, without coming of it, for the Serie A game against Sassuolo and the Champions League 3–3 draw to Barcelona, that virtually kicked the Spanish giants out of the competition.
