= Oakley Cannonier =

English footballer (born 2004)

Personal information
- Full name: Oakley William Cannonier
- Date of birth: 6 May 2004 (age 22)
- Place of birth: Leeds, England
- Height: 5 ft 6 in (1.67 m)
- Position: Striker

Team information
- Current team: Hougang United

Youth career
- 2011–2015: Leeds United
- 2015–2026: Liverpool

Senior career*
Years	Team	Apps	(Gls)
2026–	Hougang United	0	(0)

International career^{‡}
2019	England U15	1	(0)
2019	England U16	1	(0)
2022	England U18	2	(1)
2022–	England U19	2	(2)
- * Club domestic league appearances and goals as of 1 August 2026 ‡ National team caps and goals as of 10 October 2022

Oakley William Cannonier (born 6 May 2004) is an English professional footballer who plays as a striker for Singapore Premier League club Hougang United.

== Early life ==
Cannonier was born in Leeds, Yorkshire. Despite early trials with Manchester City, he joined Leeds United as an under-9.

A Liverpool supporter from an early age, as he was a fan of Fernando Torres, he joined the Liverpool academy in Kirkby, aged 11, where he soon started playing above his age group.

== Club career ==
=== Headlines as a ball boy ===
Cannonier first made headlines on 7 May 2019, following his performance as one of the ball boys for Liverpool's 4–0 win over Barcelona in the Champions League semi-final. Liverpool manager Jürgen Klopp had noticed that the Spanish team was often slow at getting in position for set-pieces, so the ball boys from The Academy were instructed to return balls to Liverpool's players as quickly as possible. With 11 minutes to go, Cannonier gave Trent Alexander-Arnold the ball, allowing him to take a quick corner, passing to Divock Origi for the decisive fourth goal, completing one of the most memorable victories in the history of the club. Liverpool went on to beat Tottenham Hotspur 2–0 in the final.

=== A top scorer with the youth teams ===
Cannonier started playing in the U18 Premier League in 2020, already scoring his first goal in November that year, in a league game against his former team, Leeds United; however, he saw his season prematurely ended because of a hamstring injury, ruling him out of that year's FA Youth Cup final. He signed his first professional contract for Liverpool in the off-season.

The following season, Cannonier proved to be a prolific goalscorer for Marc Bridge-Wilkinson's Under-18s side, as he netted his first hat-trick against Manchester United in August 2021. On 9 April 2022, he scored four goals for the youth team, as they beat his former Leeds team 10–3. By the end of the season, he had also trained with Jürgen Klopp's first-team squad.

Cannonier scored a total of 34 goals in all competitions, including 28 in the U18 Premier League, making him the competition's top scorer as Liverpool finished second in the North group, just behind league winners Manchester City. Having also played a key role in the knock-out stage of the Youth League and made his EFL Trophy debut, the striker ended the season with a new long-term contract in Liverpool.

Early in the 2022–23 season, Cannonier scored the winner against Napoli and a hat-trick against Ajax in the UEFA Youth League, as well as registering a brace against Wolverhampton Wanderers for the Under-23s in the Premier League 2.

He was released by Liverpool at the end of the 2025–26 season.

== International career ==
Cannonier is a youth international for England since 2019, as he discovered the under-16s that summer.

After the COVID-forced youth competition break, Cannonier was capped for the England under-18s in March 2022, scoring on his debut against Sweden. Later that year, he was called up to the England under-19s, scoring a brace on his first start for the team, a 6–0 victory over Georgia in qualifying for the 2023 European Under-19 Championships.

== Style of play ==
An ambidextrous footballer, Cannonier mainly plays as a centre-forward, where he proved to be a prolific goalscorer for Liverpool's youth teams. Despite then being below the height standards for this position, he stood out with his skills, movement, determination and positional awareness in front of the goal, allowing him to be regularly decisive. During his first years in the academy, he played more as a number 10, but evolved as a striker while keeping his ability to provide assists.

== Career statistics ==
=== Club ===
As of match played 6 November 2024

Appearances and goals by club, season and competition
Club	Season	League			National cup (Note: Includes FA Cup)		League cup (Note: Includes EFL Cup)		Europe		Other		Total	
Club	Season	Division	Apps	Goals	Apps	Goals	Apps	Goals	Apps	Goals	Apps	Goals	Apps	Goals
Liverpool U21	2021–22	—			—		—		—		2 (Note: Appearance(s) in EFL Trophy)	0	2	0
Liverpool U21	2022–23	—			—		—		—		1	0	1	0
Liverpool U21	2023–24	—			—		—		—		0	0	0	0
Liverpool U21	2024–25	—			—		—		—		2	0	2	0
Liverpool U21	Total		—		—		—		—		5	0	5	0
Career total			0	0	0	0	0	0	0	0	5	0	5	0
