= Tiago Andrade =

Portuguese footballer

Personal information
- Full name: Tiago Alves Pinto Andrade
- Date of birth: 21 October 2005 (age 21)
- Place of birth: Anadia, Portugal
- Height: 1.70 m (5 ft 7 in)
- Position: Left winger

Team information
- Current team: Moreirense
- Number: 19

Youth career
- 2012–2017: Anadia
- 2017–2024: Porto
- 2020–2021: → Padroense (loan)

Senior career*
Years	Team	Apps	(Gls)
2024–2026	Porto B	61	(4)
2026	Porto	0	(0)
2026–	Moreirense	3	(0)

International career^{‡}
2022	Portugal U17	7	(0)
2022	Portugal U18	5	(0)
2024–	Portugal U20	11	(5)
- * Club domestic league appearances and goals as of 9 September 2026 ‡ National team caps and goals as of 11 June 2026

Tiago Alves Pinto Andrade (born 21 October 2005) is a Portuguese footballer who plays as a left winger for Primeira Liga club Moreirense.

== Club career ==
Born in Anadia in the Aveiro District, Andrade began playing for local Anadia F.C. before joining the youth ranks of Porto in 2017. After scoring 18 goals in 32 games for the under-17 team in 2021–22, he was promoted to the under-19 team under Capucho and signed his first professional contract in January 2023. In April 2024, while on eight goals and eleven assists for the season with the under-19 team, he signed a new contract of undisclosed length and was promoted to the B-team.

Andrade made his senior debut in Liga Portugal 2 on 12 May 2024 in a 3–1 home loss to Paços de Ferreira in the penultimate game of the season, playing the first 73 minutes before being substituted for Gui Guedes. The following 6 April, against the same opponents and also at the CTFD PortoGaia, he scored his first goal as the only one in the game. During his time with the B-team, he contributed four goals and five assists.

At the start of the 2026–27 season, Porto had significant injury problems and manager Francesco Farioli called Andrade up for first-team training, and as an unused substitute for Primeira Liga games. On 26 August 2026, Andrade signed a four-year contract with fellow top-flight club Moreirense, who obtained 50% of his economic rights.

== International career ==
In February 2022, Andrade was called up for the Portugal under-17 team hosting the Algarve Tournament, in which he scored in a 4–1 win over Slovakia. Three months later, he was chosen for the 2022 UEFA European Under-17 Championship in Israel.

On 5 September 2024, in his first game for the under-20 team, Andrade scored twice in a 2–1 friendly win over Norway at the Estádio do Algarve.
