= Maro Katinić =

Croatian footballer (born 2004)

Personal information
- Date of birth: 13 April 2004 (age 22)
- Place of birth: Rijeka, Croatia
- Height: 1.86 m (6 ft 1 in)
- Position: Defender

Team information
- Current team: Sharjah
- Number: 5

Youth career
- –2019: Rijeka
- 2019–2022: Dinamo

Senior career*
Years	Team	Apps	(Gls)
2020–2022	Dinamo II	33	(1)
2023	Dinamo	0	(0)
2023	→ Bravo (loan)	22	(1)
2023–	Sharjah	38	(0)

International career^{‡}
2018	Croatia U15	2	(0)
2020	Croatia U16	3	(0)
2019–2020	Croatia U17	9	(0)
2022	Croatia U18	1	(0)
2021–2023	Croatia U19	3	(0)
2023–	Croatia U21	7	(0)
- * Club domestic league appearances and goals as of 25 May 2025 ‡ National team caps and goals as of 11 June 2024

Maro Katinić (born 13 April 2004) is a Croatian professional footballer who plays as a defender for Sharjah.

== Early life ==
Katinić was born on 13 April 2004. Born in Rijeka, Croatia, he is a native of the city.

== Club career ==
As a youth player, Katinić joined the youth academy of Croatian side Rijeka. At the age of fifteen, he joined the youth academy of Croatian side Dinamo and was promoted to the club's reserve team ahead of the 2021–22 season, where he made thirty-three league appearances and scored one goal.

During the winter of the 2022–23 season, he was sent on loan to Slovenian side Bravo, where he made twenty-two league appearances and scored one goal. Following his stint there, he signed for Emirati side Sharjah in 2023, helping the club win the 2024–25 AFC Champions League Two.

== International career ==
Katinić is a Croatia youth international. During September, October, and November 2023, he played for the Croatia national under-21 football team for 2025 UEFA European Under-21 Championship qualification.

== Style of play ==
Katinić plays as a defender and is right-footed. German news website Transfermarkt wrote in 2022 that he "stands out for his technique, strong passing and aerial play. Katinic often takes responsibility in the build-up and likes to send his teammates deep".
