= Jorge Meireles =

Portuguese footballer

Personal information
- Full name: Jorge Monteiro Meireles
- Date of birth: 4 April 2004 (age 22)
- Place of birth: Paços de Ferreira, Portugal
- Height: 1.80 m (5 ft 11 in)
- Positions: Forward; winger

Team information
- Current team: AVS
- Number: 8

Youth career
- –2014: Paços de Ferreira
- 2014–2020: Porto
- 2019–2020: → Padroense (loan)

Senior career*
Years	Team	Apps	(Gls)
2021–2025	Porto B	44	(2)
2025–2026	Estrela da Amadora	22	(0)
2026–	AVS	5	(0)

International career^{‡}
2020	Portugal U16	3	(1)
2021–2022	Portugal U18	12	(3)
2021–2023	Portugal U19	8	(0)
2023	Portugal U20	6	(1)
Medal record
Men's football
Representing Portugal
UEFA European Under-19 Championship
Runner-up	2023 Malta
- * Club domestic league appearances and goals as of 7 September 2026 ‡ National team caps and goals as of 18:04, 21 November 2023 (UTC)

Jorge Monteiro Meireles (born 4 April 2004) is a Portuguese professional footballer who plays as a forward or winger for Liga Portugal 2 club AVS.

== Club career ==
Jorge Meireles signed his first contract with FC Porto in June 2020—after a season long spell with Padroense FC where he scored 8 goals in 22 games—tying him to the club until 2023.

He made his professional debut for FC Porto B on the 28 November 2021, replacing Mor Ndiaye as his side were down by 3 goals against Feirense, in a Liga Portugal 2 game that eventually ended in a 3–2 away loss.

While making his first steps with FC Porto reserve, Meireles was a regular starter with Porto under-19s in the national competition and the UEFA Youth League, as his side that was top of a pool that included AC Milan, Liverpool and Atlético Madrid until the last round, when the Portuguese side eventually missed the knockout phase.

In the summer of 2025, Meireles joined Primeira Liga club Estrela da Amadora, signing a three-year contract.

== International career ==
Jorge Meireles is a youth international for Portugal, playing with the under-16 in 2020.

Not able to play with the under-17 in a period with most youth international encounters suspended because of COVID, Meireles took part in the Tournoi de Limoges in September 2021, notably scoring a goal as Portugal defeated the French hosts 4–2, while Spain eventually won the tournament. Later that year, he was promoted to the Portugal national under-19 team.

== Career statistics ==
As of match played 11 November 2023

Appearances and goals by club, season and competition
Club	Season	League			National cup		League cup		Continental		Total	
Club	Season	Division	Apps	Goals	Apps	Goals	Apps	Goals	Apps	Goals	Apps	Goals
Porto B	2021–22	Liga Portugal 2	3	0	—		—		—		3	0
Porto B	2022–23	Liga Portugal 2	12	0	—		—		—		12	0
Porto B	2023–24	Liga Portugal 2	7	1	—		—		—		7	1
Career total			22	1	0	0	0	0	0	0	22	1
