= 2022–23 UEFA Youth League Domestic Champions Path =

Part of football competition

The 2022–23 UEFA Youth League Domestic Champions Path began on 12 September and ended on 2 November 2022. A total of 32 teams competed in the Domestic Champions Path to decide eight of the 24 places in the knockout phase (play-offs and the round of 16 onwards) of the 2022–23 UEFA Youth League.

Times listed here by CEST/CET. (Note: Times up to 31 October 2022 (first round and second round 1st leg) are CEST (UTC+2), thereafter (second round 2nd leg) times are CET (UTC+1).)

== Draw ==
The youth domestic champions of the top 32 associations according to their 2022 UEFA country coefficients entered the Domestic Champions Path. If there was a vacancy (associations with no youth domestic competition, as well as youth domestic champions already included in the UEFA Champions League path), it was first filled by the title holders if they have not yet qualified, and then by the youth domestic champions of the next association in the UEFA ranking.

For the Domestic Champions Path, the 32 teams were drawn into two rounds of two-legged home-and-away ties. The draw for both the first round and second round was held on 31 August 2022, at the UEFA headquarters in Nyon, Switzerland. There were no seedings, but the 32 teams were split into groups defined by sporting and geographical criteria prior to the draw.

- In the first round, the 32 teams were split into four groups. Teams in the same group were drawn against each other, with the order of legs decided by draw.
- In the second round, the 16 winners of the first round, whose identity was not known at the time of the draw, were split into two groups: Group A contained the winners from Groups 1 and 2, while Group B contained the winners from Groups 3 and 4. Teams in the same group were drawn against each other, with the order of legs decided by draw.

Key to colours
Second round winners advance to the play-offs

Group 1 Team (France) Nantes (Belgium) Genk (Cyprus) Omonia (Serbia) Red Star Belgrade (Czech Republic) Slavia Prague (Switzerland) Young Boys (Slovenia) Domžale (Armenia) Pyunik	Group 2 Team (Netherlands) AZ (Scotland) Hibernian (Norway) Molde (Sweden) AIK (Luxembourg) Racing Union (Republic of Ireland) Shamrock Rovers (North Macedonia) Pobeda (Northern Ireland) Coleraine	Group 3 Team (Ukraine) Rukh Lviv (Croatia) Hajduk Split (Azerbaijan) Gabala (Hungary) MTK Budapest (Poland) Zagłębie Lubin (Slovakia) Trenčín (Lithuania) Žalgiris (Latvia) Jelgava	Group 4 Team (Turkey) Galatasaray (Greece) Panathinaikos (Israel) Ashdod (Bulgaria) Slavia Sofia (Romania) Csíkszereda (Kazakhstan) Astana (Bosnia and Herzegovina) Borac Banja Luka (Albania) Apolonia

== Format ==
In the Domestic Champions Path, each tie is played over two legs, with each team playing one leg at home. The team that scores more goals on aggregate over the two legs advances to the next round. If the aggregate score is level, as the away goals rule has been scrapped early this season, the match will be decided by a penalty shoot-out with no extra time played.

The eight second round winners advance to the play-offs, where they are joined by the eight group runners-up from the UEFA Champions League Path.

== First round ==
=== Summary ===
The first legs were played on 12–28 September and the second legs were played on 4–12 October 2022.

Team 1	Agg.	Team 2	1st leg	2nd leg
Red Star Belgrade (Serbia)	3–1 (Note: Order of legs reversed after original draw.)	(Cyprus) Omonia	1–0	2–1
Young Boys (Switzerland)	5–2	(Slovenia) Domžale	3–0	2–2
Genk (Belgium)	5–4	(Czech Republic) Slavia Prague	1–2	4–2
Nantes (France)	5–0	(Armenia) Pyunik	2–0	3–0
AZ (Netherlands)	6–1	(Republic of Ireland) Shamrock Rovers	5–0	1–1
AIK (Sweden)	8–2	(Luxembourg) Racing Union	5–0	3–2
Molde (Norway)	2–2 (4–5 p)	(Scotland) Hibernian	1–0	1–2
Coleraine (Northern Ireland)	5–4	(North Macedonia) Pobeda	3–2	2–2
MTK Budapest (Hungary)	4–0	(Latvia) Jelgava	3–0	1–0
Žalgiris (Lithuania)	2–5	(Slovakia) Trenčín	2–1	0–4
Hajduk Split (Croatia)	5–1	(Azerbaijan) Gabala	3–0	2–1
Rukh Lviv (Ukraine)	1–0	(Poland) Zagłębie Lubin	1–0	0–0
Ashdod (Israel)	5–0	(Bosnia and Herzegovina) Borac Banja Luka	2–0	3–0
Panathinaikos (Greece)	10–2	(Bulgaria) Slavia Sofia	8–0	2–2
Astana (Kazakhstan)	2–4	(Albania) Apolonia	1–1	1–3
Csíkszereda (Romania)	1–5	(Turkey) Galatasaray	1–1	0–4

=== Matches ===
14 September 2022
19:00

Red Star Belgrade (Serbia)	1–0	(Cyprus) Omonia
Stojsavljević 15'	Report

Voždovac Stadium, Belgrade
Attendance: 650
Referee: Luca Cibelli (Switzerland)
5 October 2022
16:00 (17:00 UTC+3)

Omonia (Cyprus)	1–2	(Serbia) Red Star Belgrade
Neophytou 51'	Report	Vukičević 18'; Stojsavljević 44'

Dasaki Stadium, Dasaki Achnas
Attendance: 411
Referee: Ishmael Barbara (Malta)

Red Star Belgrade won 3–1 on aggregate.

14 September 2022
18:00

Young Boys (Switzerland)	3–0	(Slovenia) Domžale
Chaiwa 27'; Maluvunu 62', 79'	Report

Stadion Wankdorf, Bern
Attendance: 493
Referee: Stefanos Koymparakis (Greece)
5 October 2022
18:00

Domžale (Slovenia)	2–2	(Switzerland) Young Boys
Jovičević 30'; Saitoski 49' (pen.)	Report	Piffero 77'; Krasniqi 84'

Domžale Sports Park, Domžale
Attendance: 1,500
Referee: Miloš Savović (Montenegro)

Young Boys won 5–2 on aggregate.

14 September 2022
16:00

Genk (Belgium)	1–2	(Czech Republic) Slavia Prague
Cutillas Carpe 86'	Report	Konečný 7'; Zachoval 76' (pen.)

Cegeka Arena - Stadium B, Genk
Attendance: 537
Referee: Jasmin Sabotic (Luxembourg)
5 October 2022
14:00

Slavia Prague (Czech Republic)	2–4	(Belgium) Genk
Pudil 9'; Ogungbayi 44'	Report	Godts 27', 80'; Diawara 47'; Al Mazyani 90+4'

Na Chvalech, Prague
Attendance: 545
Referee: Luka Bilbija (Bosnia and Herzegovina)

Genk won 5–4 on aggregate.

14 September 2022
19:00

Nantes (France)	2–0	(Armenia) Pyunik
Lukoki Mateso 52'; Appuah 63'	Report

Stade Marcel-Saupin, Nantes
Attendance: 720
Referee: Robert Ian Jenkins (Wales)
5 October 2022
16:00 (18:00 UTC+4)

Pyunik (Armenia)	0–3	(France) Nantes
	Report	Mahamoud 8', 51'; Lukoki Mateso 88'

Football Academy Stadium, Yerevan
Attendance: 350
Referee: Michal Očenáš (Slovakia)

Nantes won 5–0 on aggregate.

14 September 2022
18:00

AZ (Netherlands)	5–0	(Republic of Ireland) Shamrock Rovers
Poku 52'; Kwakman 13'; Meerdink 77'; Beukers 87'; Addai 90'	Report

AZ Training Centre, Wijdewormer
Attendance: 3,000
Referee: Denys Shurman (Ukraine)
4 October 2022
20:45 (19:45 UTC+1)

Shamrock Rovers (Republic of Ireland)	1–1	(Netherlands) AZ
Leddy 60'	Report	Kerssens 28'

Tallaght Stadium, Tallaght
Attendance: 462
Referee: Urs Schnyder (Switzerland)

AZ won 6–1 on aggregate.

14 September 2022
19:00

AIK (Sweden)	5–0	(Luxembourg) Racing Union
Andersson 27', 48', 52'; Sanyang 84'; Aviander 90+1'	Report

Skytteholms IP, Solna
Attendance: 584
Referee: Viktor Kopiievskyi (Ukraine)
5 October 2022
19:00

Racing Union (Luxembourg)	2–3	(Sweden) AIK
Machado 88', 90+2'	Report	Fesshaie Beraki 54', 71'; Granath 62'

Stade Achille Hammerel, Luxembourg City
Attendance: 549
Referee: Jan Machálek (Czech Republic)

AIK won 8–2 on aggregate.

14 September 2022
19:00

Molde (Norway)	1–0	(Scotland) Hibernian
Bakke 68'	Report

Aker Stadion, Molde
Attendance: 284
Referee: Kaarlo Oskari Hämäläinen (Finland)
5 October 2022
20:00 (21:00 UTC+1)

Hibernian (Scotland)	2–1	(Norway) Molde
Blaney 12'; Zaid 64'	Report	Tornes 85'
Penalties
Aiken (penalty scored); Blaney (penalty scored); Laidlaw (penalty scored); Hamilton (penalty scored); MacIntyre (penalty scored)	5–4	(penalty scored) Ødegård; (penalty scored) Tornes; (penalty missed) Bakke; (penalty scored) Tjåland; (penalty scored) Nyheim

Easter Road, Edinburgh
Attendance: 3,130
Referee: Helgi Mikael Jónasson (Iceland)

2–2 on aggregate; Hibernian won 5–4 on penalties.

28 September 2022 (Note: This match, originally scheduled to be played on 21 September 2022, 20:30 (19:30 UTC+1), was rescheduled to the following week at the same hour due to visa issues for Pobeda.)
20:30 (19:30 UTC+1)

Coleraine (Northern Ireland)	3–2	(North Macedonia) Pobeda
Patton 5'; Stinson 52'; Watton 59'	Report	Todoroski 42', 45+1'

The Showgrounds, Coleraine
Attendance: 682
Referee: Tom Owen (Wales)
5 October 2022
14:00

Pobeda (North Macedonia)	2–2	(Northern Ireland) Coleraine
Tosheski 6'; Todoroski 90' (pen.)	Report	Kelly 82'; Moffatt 87'

Petar Miloševski Training Centre, Skopje
Attendance: 260
Referee: Sven Jablonski (Germany)

Coleraine won 5–4 on aggregate.

14 September 2022
16:00

MTK Budapest (Hungary)	3–0	(Latvia) Jelgava
Kovács 45+1'; Merényi 57'; Molnár 88'	Report

Hidegkuti Nándor Stadion, Budapest
Attendance: 1,100
Referee: Daniyar Sakhi (Kazakhstan)
5 October 2022
13:00 (14:00 UTC+3)

Jelgava (Latvia)	0–1	(Hungary) MTK Budapest
	Report	Kovács 84'

Zemgale Olympic Center, Jelgava
Attendance: 400
Referee: Georgi Davidov (Bulgaria)

MTK Budapest won 4–0 on aggregate.

14 September 2022
18:00 (19:00 UTC+3)

Žalgiris (Lithuania)	2–1	(Slovakia) Trenčín
Bička 18'; Jansonas 52'	Report	Gajdoš 10' (pen.)

Alytus Stadium, Alytus
Attendance: 321
Referee: Ion Orlic (Moldova)
5 October 2022
18:00

Trenčín (Slovakia)	4–0	(Lithuania) Žalgiris
Bednár 31', 64'; Murko 44'; Demitra 90+2'	Report

Štadión Sihoť, Trenčín
Attendance: 1,351
Referee: Andrei Chivulete (Romania)

Trenčín won 5–2 on aggregate.

12 September 2022
17:00

Hajduk Split (Croatia)	3–0	(Azerbaijan) Gabala
Vrcić 24' (pen.); Ćalušić 51'; Nazor 83'	Report

Stadion Poljud, Split
Attendance: 1,000
Referee: David Smajc (Slovenia)
4 October 2022
15:00 (17:00 UTC+4)

Gabala (Azerbaijan)	1–2	(Croatia) Hajduk Split
Shahniyarov 52'	Report	Vušković 68'; Vrcić 88'

Gabala City Stadium, Qabala
Attendance: 130
Referee: Arda Kardeşler (Turkey)

Hajduk Split won 5–1 on aggregate.

14 September 2022
17:00

Rukh Lviv (Ukraine)	1–0	(Poland) Zagłębie Lubin
Nepeypiyev 24'	Report

Stadion Miejski, Lubin, Poland (Note: Due to the Russian invasion of Ukraine, Ukrainian teams were required to play their home matches at neutral venues until further notice.)
Attendance: 667
Referee: Miloš Savović (Montenegro)
5 October 2022
18:00

Zagłębie Lubin (Poland)	0–0	(Ukraine) Rukh Lviv
	Report

Stadion Miejski, Lubin
Attendance: 747
Referee: Ashot Ghaltakhchyan (Armenia)

Rukh Lviv won 1–0 on aggregate.

14 September 2022
18:00 (19:00 UTC+3)

Ashdod (Israel)	2–0	(Bosnia and Herzegovina) Borac Banja Luka
Abergel 25'; Muche 51' (pen.)	Report

Yud-Alef Stadium, Ashdod
Attendance: 250
Referee: Oleksii Derevinskyi (Ukraine)
12 October 2022
18:30

Borac Banja Luka (Bosnia and Herzegovina)	0–3	(Israel) Ashdod
	Report	Muche 37'; Abergel 90+2', 90+5'

Stadion Dr. Milan Jelić, Modriča
Attendance: 760
Referee: David Munro (Scotland)

Ashdod won 5–0 on aggregate.

14 September 2022
17:00

Panathinaikos (Greece)	8–0	(Bulgaria) Slavia Sofia
Mazhar 2', 30', 49', 58', 66'; Frroku 45', 45+1'; Ntampizas 90+2'	Report

Leoforos Alexandras Stadium, Athens
Attendance: 874
Referee: Snir Levy (Israel)
5 October 2022
16:00 (17:00 UTC+3)

Slavia Sofia (Bulgaria)	2–2	(Greece) Panathinaikos
Sorakov 11'; Velichkov 80'	Report	Ntampizas 48'; Kaloskamis 71'

Stadion Aleksandar Shalamanov, Sofia
Attendance: 500
Referee: Alessandro Dudic (Switzerland)

Panathinaikos won 10–2 on aggregate.

15 September 2022
15:00 (19:00 UTC+6)

Astana (Kazakhstan)	1–1	(Albania) Apolonia
Zhumabekov 45+2'	Report	Mezani 43'

Astana Arena, Astana
Attendance: 3,127
Referee: Martin Dohál (Slovakia)
5 October 2022
14:00

Apolonia (Albania)	3–1	(Kazakhstan) Astana
Maksuti 14', 60'; Kurti 62'	Report	Zhumabekov 77'

Loni Papuçiu Stadium, Fier
Attendance: 2,000
Referee: Amine Kourgheli (Belarus)

Apolonia won 4–2 on aggregate.

14 September 2022
16:00

Csíkszereda (Romania)	1–1	(Turkey) Galatasaray
El Sawy 64'	Report	Bülbül 11'

Stadionul Municipal, Miercurea Ciuc
Attendance: 1,342
Referee: Miloš Gigovic (Bosnia and Herzegovina)
5 October 2022
17:00 (18:00 UTC+3)

Galatasaray (Turkey)	4–0	(Romania) Csíkszereda
Almazbekov 58', 65'; Akman 73' (pen.); Doğan 80'	Report

Nef Stadium, Istanbul
Attendance: 185
Referee: Rob Hennessy (Republic of Ireland)

Galatasaray won 5–1 on aggregate.

== Second round ==
=== Summary ===
The first legs were played on 25–26 October and the second legs were played on 1–2 November 2022.

Team 1	Agg.	Team 2	1st leg	2nd leg
AZ (Netherlands)	3–3 (4–3 p)	(Serbia) Red Star Belgrade	2–2	1–1
Hibernian (Scotland)	3–1	(France) Nantes	1–0	2–1
Young Boys (Switzerland)	3–3 (9–8 p)	(Sweden) AIK	0–3	3–0
Coleraine (Northern Ireland)	1–10 (Note: Order of legs reversed after original draw.)	(Belgium) Genk	0–4	1–6
Panathinaikos (Greece)	6–3	(Slovakia) Trenčín	2–0	4–3
Apolonia (Albania)	1–6	(Croatia) Hajduk Split	0–3	1–3
Galatasaray (Turkey)	2–6	(Ukraine) Rukh Lviv	1–3	1–3
Ashdod (Israel)	1–2	(Hungary) MTK Budapest	0–2	1–0

=== Matches ===
25 October 2022
18:00

AZ (Netherlands)	2–2	(Serbia) Red Star Belgrade
Poku 9'; Addai 28'	Report	Mijatović 48'; Vukičević 83'

AZ Training Centre, Wijdewormer
Attendance: 250
Referee: David Munro (Scotland)
1 November 2022
18:00

Red Star Belgrade (Serbia)	1–1	(Netherlands) AZ
Leković 87'	Report	Poku 77'
Penalties
Vidojević (penalty missed); Ivić (penalty scored); Stanković (penalty scored); Radujko (penalty scored); Mijatović (penalty missed)	3–4	(penalty missed) Goes; (penalty scored) Kerssens; (penalty scored) De Jong; (penalty scored) Beukers; (penalty scored) Meerdink

Voždovac Stadium, Belgrade
Attendance: 770
Referee: David Fuxman (Israel)

3–3 on aggregate; AZ won 4–3 on penalties.

26 October 2022
20:00 (19:00 UTC+1)

Hibernian (Scotland)	1–0	(France) Nantes
Laidlaw 75' (pen.)	Report

Easter Road, Edinburgh
Attendance: 2,816
Referee: Joonas Jaanovits (Estonia)
2 November 2022
19:00

Nantes (France)	1–2	(Scotland) Hibernian
Mahamoud 17'	Report	O'Connor 22'; Allan-Molotnikov 48'

Stade Marcel-Saupin, Nantes
Attendance: 994
Referee: Kári á Høvdanum (Faroe Islands)

Hibernian won 3–1 on aggregate.

26 October 2022
18:00

Young Boys (Switzerland)	0–3	(Sweden) AIK
	Report	Noori 29' (pen.); Fesshaie Beraki 70'; Rawufu 90+7'

Stadion Wankdorf, Bern
Attendance: 464
Referee: Marian Alexandru Barbu (Romania)
2 November 2022
19:00

AIK (Sweden)	0–3	(Switzerland) Young Boys
	Report	Chaiwa 7'; Buljan 41'; Lüthi 47'
Penalties
Noori (penalty scored); Granath (penalty scored); Rawufu (penalty scored); Ayari (penalty scored); Andersson (penalty scored); Rupia-Ellis (penalty scored); Aviander (penalty scored); Sundberg (penalty scored); Melin (penalty missed)	8–9	(penalty scored) Buljan; (penalty scored) Chaiwa; (penalty scored) Krasniqi; (penalty scored) Fontana; (penalty scored) Essay; (penalty scored) Näf; (penalty scored) Ogouvide; (penalty scored) Henchoz; (penalty scored) Piffero

Skytteholms IP, Solna
Attendance: 345
Referee: Oleksii Derevinskyi (Ukraine)

3–3 on aggregate; Young Boys won 9–8 on penalties.

26 October 2022
15:00 (14:00 UTC+1)

Coleraine (Northern Ireland)	0–4	(Belgium) Genk
	Report	Rotundo 23'; Da Costa 30'; Van de Perre 63'; Claes 85'

The Showgrounds, Coleraine
Attendance: 545
Referee: Mohammed Al-Emara (Finland)
2 November 2022
15:00

Genk (Belgium)	6–1	(Northern Ireland) Coleraine
Smekens 5'; Claes 17'; Arabaci 35', 85'; Sakkali 43'; Watton 90' (o.g.)	Report	Patton 69'

Cegeka Arena - Stadium B, Genk
Attendance: 553
Referee: Viktor Shimusik (Belarus)

Genk won 10–1 on aggregate.

26 October 2022
18:00 (19:00 UTC+3)

Panathinaikos (Greece)	2–0	(Slovakia) Trenčín
Mazhar 28'; Frroku 38'	Report

Leoforos Alexandras Stadium, Athens
Attendance: 150
Referee: Gustavo Correia (Portugal)
2 November 2022
17:30

Trenčín (Slovakia)	3–4	(Greece) Panathinaikos
Mičuda 6'; Praženka 21', 29'	Report	Mazhar 11', 49', 68' (pen.); Kyriopoulos 80'

Štadión Sihoť, Trenčín
Attendance: 2,251
Referee: Chrysovalantis Theouli (Cyprus)

Panathinaikos won 6–3 on aggregate.

26 October 2022
14:00

Apolonia (Albania)	0–3	(Croatia) Hajduk Split
	Report	Vrcić 28'; Antunović 54'; Brajković 63'

Loni Papuçiu Stadium, Fier
Attendance: 2,000
Referee: Ishmael Barbara (Malta)
2 November 2022
15:00

Hajduk Split (Croatia)	3–1	(Albania) Apolonia
Vrcić 15'; Nazor 73'; Pukstas 77'	Report	Maksuti 9'

Stadion Poljud, Split
Attendance: 500
Referee: Yigal Frid (Israel)

Hajduk Split won 6–1 on aggregate.

26 October 2022
13:00 (14:00 UTC+3)

Galatasaray (Turkey)	1–3	(Ukraine) Rukh Lviv
Akman 34'	Report	Stolyarchuk 4'; Erdem 8' (o.g.); Dobryanskyi 79'

Nef Stadium, Istanbul
Attendance: 620
Referee: Sander van der Eijk (Netherlands)
2 November 2022
14:00

Rukh Lviv (Ukraine)	3–1	(Turkey) Galatasaray
Fedor 11', 76'; Rusyak 78'	Report	Aksaka 90+1' (pen.)

Subcarpathian Football Center, Stalowa Wola, Poland
Attendance: 600
Referee: Nenad Minakovic (Serbia)

Rukh Lviv won 6–2 on aggregate.

26 October 2022
17:00 (18:00 UTC+3)

Ashdod (Israel)	0–2	(Hungary) MTK Budapest
	Report	Barkóczi 59'; Molnár 80'

Yud-Alef Stadium, Ashdod
Attendance: 530
Referee: Amine Kourgheli (Belarus)
2 November 2022
16:00

MTK Budapest (Hungary)	0–1	(Israel) Ashdod
	Report	Yusopove 42'

Hidegkuti Nándor Stadion, Budapest
Attendance: 527
Referee: Evangelos Manouchos (Greece)

MTK Budapest won 2–1 on aggregate.
