= 2023–24 Jong AZ season =

Jong AZ
2023–24 season
- Manager: Jan Sierksma
- Stadium: Kalverhoek
- Eerste Divisie: 10th
- Top goalscorer: League: Ernest Poku (12); All: Ernest Poku (12)

The 2023–24 season was Jong AZ's 57th season in existence and seventh consecutive in the Eerste Divisie.

== Players ==
=== First-team squad ===
As of 1 September 2023

Note: Flags indicate national team as defined under FIFA eligibility rules; some limited exceptions apply. Players may hold more than one non-FIFA nationality.

No.	Pos.	Nation	Player
—	GK	NED	Tristan Kuijsten
—	GK	NED	Arouna Kabba
—	GK	NED	Jur Schipper
—	GK	NED	Daniël Virginio Deen
—	DF	NED	Loek Postma
—	DF	NED	Enoch Mastoras
—	DF	NED	Jesse Buurmeester
—	DF	NED	Sem Dekkers
—	DF	NED	Jeremiah Esajas
—	DF	NED	Misha Engel
—	DF	NED	Finn Stam
—	DF	NED	Jurre van Aken
—	DF	NED	Jorn Berkhout

No.	Pos.	Nation	Player
—	MF	NED	Nick Twisk
—	MF	NED	Kees Smit
—	MF	NED	Job Kalisvaart
—	MF	NED	Tom Kerssens
—	MF	NED	Dave Kwakman
—	FW	USA	Joshua Pynadath
—	FW	NED	Yoël van den Ban
—	FW	NED	Jayden Addai
—	FW	NED	Ro-Zangelo Daal
—	FW	NED	Ricuenio Kewal
—	FW	NED	Damienus Reverson
—	MF	SUR	Jayden Gerold
—	FW	NED	Nick Koster

=== Out on loan ===
Note: Flags indicate national team as defined under FIFA eligibility rules; some limited exceptions apply. Players may hold more than one non-FIFA nationality.

No.	Pos.	Nation	Player
—	FW	NED	Iman Griffith (on loan at Fortuna Sittard)

== Transfers ==
=== In ===
Pos.	Player	Transferred from	Fee	Date	Source

=== Out ===
Pos.	Player	Transferred to	Fee	Date	Source

== Pre-season and friendlies ==
Win Draw Loss Fixtures

8 July 2023 Friendly	Katwijk (Netherlands)	2–3	(Netherlands) Jong AZ
12:00

12 July 2023 Friendly	VVV-Venlo (Netherlands)	1–2	(Netherlands) Jong AZ	Horst
16:00				Stadium: Sportpark Ter Horst veld 1

19 July 2023 Friendly	RSCA Futures (Belgium)	3–2	(Netherlands) Jong AZ
15:00

22 July 2023 Friendly	Jong AZ (Netherlands)	2–0	(Netherlands) AFC
14:00

26 July 2023 Friendly	Koninklijke HFC (Netherlands)	1–0	(Netherlands) Jong AZ
20:00

29 July 2023 Friendly	TOP Oss (Netherlands)	3–1	(Netherlands) Jong AZ	Oss
14:00				Stadium: Frans Heesen Stadion

4 August 2023 Friendly	Club NXT (Belgium)	1–0	(Netherlands) Jong AZ	Roeselare, Belgium
16:00				Stadium: The NEST

16 November 2023 Friendly	Jong AZ (Netherlands)	2–0	(Netherlands) Koninklijke HFC
19:30

6 January 2024 Friendly	HHC Hardenberg (Netherlands)	0–1	(Netherlands) Jong AZ
13:30

6 January 2024 Friendly	Jong AZ (Netherlands)	0–0	(Netherlands) IJsselmeervogels
14:30

== Competitions ==
=== Overall record ===
Competition	First match	Last match	Starting round	Final position	Record							
Competition	First match	Last match	Starting round	Final position	Pld	W	D	L	GF	GA	GD	Win %
Eerste Divisie	14 August 2023	10 May 2024	Matchday 1	10th	38	16	8	14	62	61	+1	42.11
Total					38	16	8	14	62	61	+1	42.11

Source: Soccerway

=== Eerste Divisie ===
==== League table ====
Pos	Team	Pld	W	D	L	GF	GA	GD	Pts	Promotion or qualification
8	NAC Breda (O, P)	38	15	11	12	63	56	+7	56	Qualification for promotion play-offs
9	MVV Maastricht	38	16	8	14	64	60	+4	56	
10	Jong AZ	38	16	8	14	62	61	+1	56	Reserve teams are not eligible to be promoted to the Eredivisie
11	Helmond Sport	38	14	9	15	52	55	−3	51	
12	VVV-Venlo	38	13	9	16	53	58	−5	48	

Source: Flashscore, Keuken Kampioen Divisie (in Dutch)
Rules for classification: Season in progress: 1) Most points won; 2) Less points lost; 3) Goal difference; 4) Goals scored; 5) Alphabetical order; End of season: 1) Points; 2) Goal difference; 3) Goals scored; 4) Head-to-head points; 5) Head-to-head goal difference; 6) Head-to-head away goals scored; 7) Play-off if relevant for deciding champion, relegation or participating in a European league, otherwise by draw. 8) Penalty shoot-out (only after a play-off)
(O) Play-off winners; (P) Promoted

==== Results summary ====
Overall								Home						Away					
Pld	W	D	L	GF	GA	GD	Pts	W	D	L	GF	GA	GD	W	D	L	GF	GA	GD
0	0	0	0	0	0	0	0	0	0	0	0	0	0	0	0	0	0	0	0

Last updated: August 2023.

==== Results by round ====
Round	1
Ground	
Result	
Position	

Updated to match(es) played on August 2023. Source:
A = Away; H = Home; W = Win; D = Draw; L = Loss

==== Matches ====
The league fixtures were unveiled on 30 June 2023.

14 August 2023 1	Jong AZ	1–0	Jong Utrecht	Wijdewormer
20:00	Addai 45+2'; Postma (yellow card) 62' (yellow-red card) 86'			Stadium: AFAS Trainingscomplex

18 August 2023 2	NAC Breda	2–1	Jong AZ	Breda
20:00	Janošek 41' (pen.), 43'		Addai 75' (pen.)	Stadium: Rat Verlegh Stadion

28 August 2023 3	Jong AZ	3–1	Telstar	Wijdewormer
20:00	Addai 23', 81', 90+4' (pen.)		Kruiver (yellow card) 45+1' (yellow-red card) 48'; Eddahchouri 90+2'	Stadium: AFAS Trainingscomplex

3 September 2023 4	ADO Den Haag	4–1	Jong AZ	The Hague
16:45				Stadium: Bingoal Stadion

15 September 2023 6	Jong AZ	0–0	Eindhoven	Wijdewormer
20:00				Stadium: AFAS Trainingscomplex

18 September 2023 5	Jong AZ	5–2	Jong Ajax	Wijdewormer
20:00				Stadium: AFAS Trainingscomplex

22 September 2023 7	Dordrecht	0–0	Jong AZ	Dordrecht

29 September 2023 8	Jong AZ	0–2	Willem II	Wijdewormer
				Stadium: AFAS Trainingscomplex

6 October 2023 9	Roda JC	3–1	Jong AZ

20 October 2023 11	Jong AZ	3–0	TOP Oss

23 October 2023 10	Jong AZ	3–0	De Graafschap

27 October 2023 12	Emmen	2–1	Jong AZ

3 November 2023 13	VVV-Venlo	2–2	Jong AZ

10 November 2023 14	Jong AZ	2–1	Helmond Sport

24 November 2023 16	Jong PSV	1–2	Jong AZ

27 November 2023 15	Jong AZ	0–5	Groningen

1 December 2023 17	MVV Maastricht	4–0	Jong AZ

11 December 2023 18	Jong AZ	0–0	Den Bosch

15 December 2023 19	Cambuur	1–2	Jong AZ

23 December 2023 20	Jong AZ	1–2	ADO Den Haag

12 January 2024 21	Telstar	1–1	Jong AZ

22 January 2024 22	Jong AZ	5–1	Dordrecht

26 January 2024 23	Groningen	4–1	Jong AZ

5 February 2024 24	Jong AZ	1–0	Roda JC

12 February 2024 25	Jong Utrecht	1–2	Jong AZ

16 February 2024 26	Den Bosch	0–0	Jong AZ

26 February 2024 27	Jong AZ	2–3	NAC Breda

1 March 2024 28	Eindhoven	1–1	Jong AZ

8 March 2024 29	Jong AZ	4–1	Jong PSV

11 March 2024 31	Helmond Sport	3–1	Jong AZ

15 March 2024 30	Jong AZ	2–0	Cambuur

29 March 2024 32	De Graafschap	2–1	Jong AZ

8 April 2024 33	Jong AZ	3–2	Emmen

12 April 2024 34	Willem II	4–1	Jong AZ

22 April 2024 35	Jong AZ	2–1	VVV-Venlo

26 April 2024 36	TOP Oss	1–1	Jong AZ

3 May 2024 37	Jong AZ	2–3	MVV Maastricht

10 May 2024 38	Jong Ajax	1–4	Jong AZ
