= Martijn Meerdink =

Dutch footballer

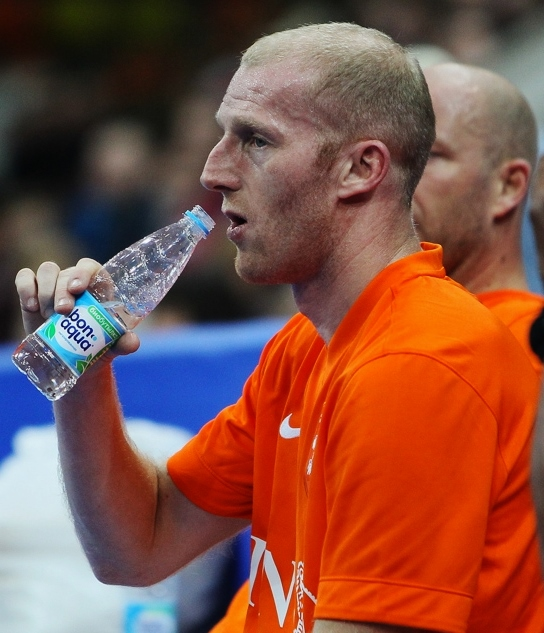
- Meerdink in 2015

Personal information
- Date of birth: 15 September 1976 (age 50)
- Place of birth: Winterswijk, Netherlands
- Height: 1.81 m (5 ft 11 in)
- Position: Winger

Youth career
- WVC Winterswijk
- De Graafschap

Senior career*
Years	Team	Apps	(Gls)
1998–2002	De Graafschap	91	(21)
2002–2007	AZ	94	(18)
2007–2009	Groningen	44	(2)
2009–2010	De Graafschap	6	(1)
Total		230	(41)

International career
2006	Netherlands	1	(0)
- * Club domestic league appearances and goals

Martijn Meerdink (born 15 September 1976) is a Dutch former professional footballer who played for AZ Alkmaar as a winger and was capped for the Netherlands.

== Club career ==
In January 2007, he moved from AZ to FC Groningen in a transfer worth £150,000. In July 2009, he returned to his first club, De Graafschap, but a serious injury effectively ended his professional career. He retired from professional football in March 2010.

== Personal life ==
Meerdink's son Mexx Meerdink plays for AZ Alkmaar.

== Honours ==
De Graafschap

- Eerste Divisie: 2009-2010

AZ Alkmaar

- Eredivisie runner-up: 2005-2006
- KNVB Cup runner-up: 2006-2007
