= 2025–26 Professional U21 Development League =

Youth Football League in England

Premier League 2
- Season: 2025–26
- Dates: 15 August 2025 – 13 April 2026
- Champions: Brighton & Hove Albion U21s (1st title)
- Matches: 304 (290 RS, 14 PO)
- Goals: 1,094 (3.6 per match) (1039 RS, 55 PO)
- Best player: (England) Shumaira Mheuka (Chelsea U21s)
- Top goalscorer: (England) Shumaira Mheuka (Chelsea U21s) (18 Goals) (17 Regular Season, 1 Playoff)
- Biggest home win: Manchester City U21s 8–1 Burnley U21s (9 January 2026); Liverpool U21s 7–0 Arsenal U21s (18 January 2026)
- Biggest away win: Newcastle United U21s 0–5 Chelsea U21s (22 August 2025); Stoke City U21s 1–6 Manchester City U21s (30 January 2026)
- Highest scoring: Everton U21s 8–4 Ipswich Town U21s (17 April 2026)
- Longest winning run: 7 games Manchester United U21s (18 August 2025 – 25 October 2025); Manchester City U21s (30 January 2026 – 20 March 2026)
- Longest unbeaten run: 13 games Fulham U21s (15 August 2025 – 6 February 2026)
- Longest winless run: 9 games Reading U21s (15 August 2025 – 10 January 2026); Burnley U21s (31 October 2025 – 27 February 2026)
- Longest losing run: 7 games Stoke City U21s (23 January 2026 – 16 March 2026)
- All statistics correct as of 13 April 2026.

The 2025–26 Premier League 2 was the 14th season of the Professional Development League system. It continued to use the same format as the previous 2 seasons with a change from places 17 to 24. The sides that finished in the top eight positions of the Professional U21 Development League 2 at the end of the season progressed to a playoff stage against teams 17–24. 29 Category One Academies competed, the most in league history. Three teams joined with Category One status with Birmingham City U21s, Burnley U21s returning after a three-season absence and Ipswich Town U21s playing in the Premier League 2 for the very first time.

== Premier League 2 ==
=== Table ===
Pos	Team	Pld	W	D	L	GF	GA	GD	Pts	
1	Chelsea U21s (R)	20	14	1	5	52	25	+27	43	Qualification to the Elimination Playoffs and Premier League International Cup
2	Manchester United U21s	20	13	4	3	43	26	+17	43	Qualification to the Elimination Playoffs and Premier League International Cup
3	Manchester City U21s	20	13	1	6	59	21	+38	40	Qualification to the Elimination Playoffs and Premier League International Cup
4	Fulham U21s	20	11	5	4	48	32	+16	38	Qualification to the Elimination Playoffs and Premier League International Cup
5	Ipswich Town U21s	20	12	2	6	45	45	0	38	Qualification to the Elimination Playoffs and Premier League International Cup
6	Southampton U21s	20	10	6	4	36	29	+7	36	Qualification to the Elimination Playoffs and Premier League International Cup
7	Liverpool U21s	20	11	2	7	49	36	+13	35	Qualification to the Elimination Playoffs and Premier League International Cup
8	Tottenham Hotspur U21s	20	11	2	7	42	32	+10	35	Qualification to the Elimination Playoffs and Premier League International Cup
9	Leicester City U21s	20	9	4	7	48	42	+6	31	Qualification to the Elimination Playoffs and Premier League International Cup
10	Crystal Palace U21s	20	9	4	7	36	31	+5	31	Qualification to the Elimination Playoffs and Premier League International Cup
11	Aston Villa U21s	20	9	4	7	32	35	−3	31	Qualification to the Elimination Playoffs and Premier League International Cup
12	Brighton & Hove Albion U21s (C)	20	8	6	6	38	25	+13	30	Qualification to the Elimination Playoffs and Premier League International Cup
13	West Ham United U21s	20	8	6	6	44	35	+9	30	Qualification to the Elimination Playoffs and Premier League International Cup
14	Arsenal U21s	20	8	5	7	28	33	−5	29	Qualification to the Elimination Playoffs and Premier League International Cup
15	Sunderland U21s	20	8	4	8	41	40	+1	28	Qualification to the Elimination Playoffs and Premier League International Cup
16	Middlesbrough U21s	20	7	6	7	37	28	+9	27	Qualification to the Elimination Playoffs and Premier League International Cup
17	Nottingham Forest U21s	20	8	2	10	23	23	0	26	Qualification to the PL2/PDL Playoffs
18	Everton U21s	20	7	4	9	33	36	−3	25	Qualification to the PL2/PDL Playoffs
19	Reading U21s	20	7	4	9	29	36	−7	25	Qualification to the PL2/PDL Playoffs
20	Stoke City U21s	20	7	4	9	29	42	−13	25	Qualification to the PL2/PDL Playoffs
21	Newcastle United U21s	20	6	6	8	30	35	−5	24	Qualification to the PL2/PDL Playoffs
22	Wolverhampton Wanderers U21s	20	6	5	9	30	45	−15	23	Qualification to the PL2/PDL Playoffs
23	Norwich City U21s	20	5	5	10	32	42	−10	20	Qualification to the PL2/PDL Playoffs
24	Derby County U21s	20	5	5	10	26	44	−18	20	Qualification to the PL2/PDL Playoffs
25	Leeds United U21s	20	5	3	12	28	40	−12	18	
26	West Bromwich Albion U21s	20	5	3	12	26	41	−15	18	
27	Birmingham City U21s	20	4	5	11	26	52	−26	17	
28	Blackburn Rovers U21s	20	4	2	14	27	46	−19	14	
29	Burnley U21s	20	3	4	13	22	42	−20	13	

Source: Premier League 2 Table
(C) Champions; (R) Regular Season Champions

=== Matches ===
Home \ Away	ARS	AVL	BIR	BLB	BHA	BUR	CHE	CRY	DER	EVE	FUL	IPS	LEE	LEI	LIV	MNC	MNU	MID	NEW	NOR	NFO	REA	SOU	STK	SUN	TOT	WBA	WHU	WOL
Arsenal U21s	—	—	—	—	1–0	1–0	—	—	—	0–0	2–3	0–1	—	1–5	—	—	—	—	1–0	—	—	—	—	—	—	—	1–0	2–2	3–2
Aston Villa U21s	—	—	—	—	—	—	1–2	0–2	—	—	—	5–4	0–3	—	—	0–4	—	0–2	3–4	2–1	—	—	—	—	3–3	—	—	—	2–0
Birmingham City U21s	—	1–1	—	—	—	—	1–4	—	—	1–1	1–3	0–3	—	—	—	1–5	1–1	—	2–2	—	2–1	—	—	2–2	—	—	—	—	—
Blackburn Rovers U21s	—	1–2	5–0	—	0–4	—	—	1–2	1–4	—	—	—	—	—	—	2–0	—	1–1	—	—	0–3	—	—	—	—	0–2	—	2–4	—
Brighton & Hove Albion U21s	—	0–0	3–2	—	—	—	—	—	3–1	5–0	3–4	—	—	—	0–1	2–0	—	1–1	—	—	—	—	—	—	0–2	—	4–0	—	—
Burnley U21s	—	—	0–2	0–2	0–2	—	0–1	—	1–1	—	—	—	1–2	—	—	—	—	—	—	—	—	1–3	—	—	0–3	1–1	—	—	1–2
Chelsea U21s	2–1	—	—	5–0	—	—	—	4–1	—	—	—	2–4	2–2	—	—	3–1	—	—	—	—	—	4–1	4–2	1–2	4–0	—	—	—	—
Crystal Palace U21s	2–0	—	3–1	—	—	—	—	—	6–0	—	2–1	—	3–2	—	—	—	—	1–1	0–2	—	—	—	—	2–2	0–1	—	—	—	2–2
Derby County U21s	0–1	0–0	0–3	—	—	—	—	—	—	—	—	—	—	0–2	—	1–0	—	1–0	—	0–3	0–0	—	—	—	2–1	—	—	4–2	—
Everton U21s	—	2–3	—	1–0	—	2–2	1–0	—	—	—	3–4	8–4	—	0–2	—	3–2	1–2	—	—	—	—	—	—	—	1–2	—	—	—	—
Fulham U21s	—	—	—	—	—	3–1	2–1	—	4–4	—	—	—	—	—	1–1	—	2–2	1–1	—	—	1–2	—	—	—	—	1–1	2–0	5–0	—
Ipswich Town U21s	—	—	—	—	3–1	0–0	—	2–1	4–3	—	1–2	—	—	—	3–2	—	—	—	1–0	—	—	—	2–2	2–1	—	—	0–3	—	—
Leeds United U21s	0–4	—	—	—	2–2	—	—	—	—	—	—	2–3	—	2–3	—	—	1–2	—	—	1–0	1–2	—	—	0–1	—	1–0	—	1–3	—
Leicester City U21s	—	2–3	6–2	3–3	—	—	1–2	—	—	—	—	—	—	—	4–2	—	1–4	—	2–2	2–1	—	—	3–1	—	—	3–6	—	—	—
Liverpool U21s	7–0	—	—	—	—	2–3	—	1–5	—	4–1	—	—	2–1	—	—	—	1–2	4–2	—	—	—	—	—	—	—	4–2	4–3	—	5–0
Manchester City U21s	—	—	—	—	—	8–1	—	—	—	—	—	—	3–0	4–0	2–0	—	—	—	—	3–0	3–0	3–0	3–3	—	—	—	—	3–1	6–0
Manchester United U21s	—	—	—	0–4	1–1	—	0–2	4–1	1–1	—	—	—	—	—	—	2–1	—	—	1–3	4–2	—	—	2–1	—	—	4–1	—	—	—
Middlesbrough U21s	—	—	1–4	—	—	—	—	—	—	0–1	—	6–1	—	—	—	—	0–1	—	—	2–2	1–0	5–2	—	6–1	—	—	—	3–3	0–1
Newcastle United U21s	—	—	—	2–0	2–2	3–2	0–5	—	—	—	3–0	—	—	—	—	—	—	0–1	—	2–3	—	—	1–2	—	—	1–4	—	—	1–1
Norwich City U21s	2–2	—	—	—	—	1–4	—	—	—	2–1	0–2	—	—	—	2–3	—	—	—	—	—	—	1–1	1–1	4–2	—	—	4–1	—	0–3
Nottingham Forest U21s	2–2	2–3	—	—	—	—	—	2–0	—	—	—	0–1	—	—	0–3	—	—	—	3–0	—	—	0–1	1–2	—	2–0	—	1–0	—	—
Reading U21s	1–4	—	—	4–1	—	—	—	—	4–1	1–0	1–5	—	0–2	0–0	—	—	0–1	—	1–1	—	—	—	—	3–0	—	—	—	—	—
Southampton U21s	1–1	—	—	—	1–0	2–1	—	—	4–1	2–2	—	—	2–1	—	1–1	—	—	2–1	—	—	—	—	—	—	3–2	—	2–0	—	—
Stoke City U21s	—	0–1	—	3–1	—	1–3	—	—	—	—	3–2	—	—	—	1–2	1–6	—	—	—	—	2–1	—	1–0	—	—	1–2	1–1	—	—
Sunderland U21s	3–1	—	—	—	—	—	—	—	—	—	—	4–2	5–2	3–2	—	1–2	—	—	1–1	—	—	2–2	—	1–2	—	3–5	—	2–4	—
Tottenham Hotspur U21s	—	—	4–0	—	—	—	—	2–3	—	0–2	—	—	—	—	—	—	—	1–3	—	4–1	1–0	—	1–2	—	—	—	1–0	3–2	1–0
West Bromwich Albion U21s	—	1–3	4–0	3–2	—	—	—	0–0	4–2	0–3	—	—	2–2	1–3	—	—	1–5	—	—	—	—	2–1	—	—	—	—	—	—	—
West Ham United U21s	—	1–0	3–0	—	3–3	—	5–0	3–0	—	—	—	—	—	1–1	3–0	—	—	—	—	2–2	0–1	1–2	—	—	—	—	—	—	—
Wolverhampton Wanderers U21s	—	—	—	3–1	1–2	—	0–4	—	—	—	—	3–4	—	4–3	—	—	1–4	—	—	—	—	2–1	—	2–2	2–2	—	—	1–1	—

Source: Premier League 2 Results
Legend: Blue = home team win; Yellow = draw; Red = away team win.

=== Elimination Playoffs ===
Round of 16
1	Chelsea U21s	1
16	Middlesbrough U21s	0
8	Tottenham Hotspur U21s	1
9	Leicester City U21s	0
5	Ipswich Town U21s	1
12	Brighton & Hove Albion U21s	2
4	Fulham U21s	2 (3)
13	West Ham United U21s (pen.)	2 (4)
6	Southampton U21s	3 (4)
11	Aston Villa U21s (pen.)	3 (5)
3	Manchester City U21s	3
14	Arsenal U21s	1
7	Liverpool U21s	3 (1)
10	Crystal Palace U21s (pen.)	3 (4)
2	Manchester United U21s	3
15	Sunderland U21s	2

Quarter-finals
1	Chelsea U21s	1
8	Tottenham Hotspur U21s	3
12	Brighton & Hove Albion U21s	3
13	West Ham United U21s	0
11	Aston Villa U21s	2
3	Manchester City U21s	3
10	Crystal Palace U21s	0
2	Manchester United U21s	2

Semi-finals
8	Tottenham Hotspur U21s	1
12	Brighton & Hove Albion U21s	3
3	Manchester City U21s	3
2	Manchester United U21s	4

Final
12	Brighton & Hove Albion U21s	1
2	Manchester United U21s	0

==== Round of 16 ====
24 April 2026
19:00 BST

Fulham U21s	2–2 (a.e.t.)	West Ham United U21s
Ali Wahid 14'; Casey 104'	Report	Cummings 44'; Orford 109'
Penalties
Wingate (penalty missed); Casey (penalty scored); Nsasi (penalty scored); Benchaita (penalty scored); Dair (penalty missed)	3–4	(penalty scored) Ajala; (penalty scored) Orford; (penalty scored) Cummings; (penalty scored) Golambeckis

Motspur Park, New Malden
Attendance: 167
Referee: William Davis

24 April 2026
19:00 BST

Ipswich Town U21s	1–2	Brighton & Hove Albion U21s
Mendel-Idowu 41'	Report	Robertson 45+3'; Keogh 74'

Portman Road, Ipswich
Attendance: 233
Referee: Richie Watkins

24 April 2026
19:00 BST

Southampton U21s	3–3 (a.e.t.)	Aston Villa U21s
O'Brien-Whitmarsh 5'; Kakay 77'; Sesay 90+2'	Report	Mosquera 31'; Mulley 55'; Lynch 68'
Penalties
O'Brien-Whitmarsh (penalty scored); Daley (penalty missed); Gathercole (penalty scored); Charles (penalty scored); Moody (penalty scored)	4–5	Cotcher (penalty scored); Lynskey (penalty scored); Carroll (penalty scored); Burrowes (penalty scored); Mosquera (penalty scored)

Staplewood, Marchwood
Attendance: 250
Referee: Adrian Quelch

24 April 2026
19:00 BST

Tottenham Hotspur U21s	1–0	Leicester City U21s
Thompson 27'	Report

Stevenage FC Stadium, Stevenage
Attendance: 355
Referee: Callum Walchester

25 April 2026
14:00 BST

Chelsea U21s	1–0	Middlesbrough U21s
Eboué 62'	Report

Kingsmeadow, Kingston upon Thames
Attendance: 185
Referee: Wayne Cartmel

25 April 2026
19:00 BST

Manchester City U21s	3–1	Arsenal U21s
McFarlane 55'; Nypan 61'; McAidoo 83'	Report	Harriman-Annous 43'

Joie Stadium, Manchester
Attendance: 231
Referee: Andrew Miller

26 April 2026
14:00 BST

Liverpool U21s	3–3 (a.e.t.)	Crystal Palace U21s
Wright 12', 58'; Figueroa 112'	Report	Cardines 15'; Marsh 29'; Farquhar 109'
Penalties
Morrison (penalty scored); Laffey (penalty missed); Wright (penalty missed); Figueroa (penalty missed)	1–3	Umolu (penalty missed); Reid (penalty scored); Cardines (penalty scored); Gibbard (penalty scored)

Kirkby Academy, Kirkby
Attendance: 155
Referee: Aaron Bannister

26 April 2026
14:00 BST

Manchester United U21s	3–2	Sunderland U21s
Obi 15'; Fletcher 27'; Lacey 57'	Report	Scott 30'; Whittaker 73'

Progress with Unity Stadium, Leigh
Attendance: 473
Referee: Niall Smith

==== Quarterfinals ====
1 May 2026
19:00 BST

Aston Villa U21s	2–3	Manchester City U21s
Burrowes 2'; Lynch 47'	Report	Sangaré 6'; Samba 60'; Braithwaite 65'

Bodymoor Heath Training Ground, Bodymoor Heath
Attendance: 187
Referee: Declan Bourne

1 May 2026
19:00 BST

Chelsea U21s	1–3	Tottenham Hotspur U21s
Mheuka 4'	Report	Melia 56'; Russell-Denny 75'; Black 88'

Kingsmeadow, Kingston upon Thames
Attendance: 427
Referee: Alan Dale

4 May 2026
18:00 BST

Crystal Palace U21s	0–2	Manchester United U21s
	Report	Armer 39'; Obi 73'

VBS Community Stadium, Sutton
Attendance: 289
Referee: Adrian Quelch

4 May 2026
19:00 BST

Brighton & Hove Albion U21s	3–0	West Ham United U21s
Mackley 35'; Nti 40'; Robertson 83'	Report

American Express Elite Football Performance Centre, Lancing
Attendance: 234
Referee: Sam Mulhall

==== Semifinals ====
8 May 2026
19:00 BST

Tottenham Hotspur U21s	1–3	Brighton & Hove Albion U21s
Melia 59' (pen.)	Report	Atom 29'; Nti 56'; Shaw 79'

Tottenham Hotspur Stadium, London
Attendance: 972
Referee: Craig Hicks

8 May 2026
19:00 BST

Manchester City U21s	3–4	Manchester United U21s
Samba 3', 82'; Sangaré 48'	Report	Obi 29', 34'; Lacey 48'; Moorhouse 48'

Joie Stadium, Manchester
Attendance: 1,300
Referee: Oliver Mackey

==== Final ====
16 May 2026
19:30 BST

Brighton & Hove Albion U21s	1–0	Manchester United U21s
Silsby 58'	Report

Falmer Stadium, Falmer
Attendance: 1,250
Referee: Alan Dale

=== Top goalscorers ===
As of 1 May 2026

Rank	Player	Club	Goals
1	(England) Shumaira Mheuka	Chelsea U21s	18
2	(Northern Ireland) Braiden Graham	Everton U21s	16
3	(Northern Ireland) Kieran Morrison	Liverpool U21s	14
4	(Denmark) Chido Obi	Manchester United U21s	13
5	(Honduras) Keyrol Figueroa	Liverpool U21s	12
6	(England) Bradley Burrowes	Aston Villa U21s	11
6	(England) Nicholas Oyekunle	Southampton U21s	11
8	(England) Sean Neave	Newcastle United U21s	10
8	(Bangladesh) Farhaan Ali Wahid	Fulham U21s	10
8	(England) Matthew Warhurst	Manchester City U21s	10

=== Hat-tricks ===
As of 17 April 2026

Player	For	Against	Result	Date	Ref.
(England) Shane Nti	Brighton & Hove Albion U21s	West Bromwich Albion U21s	0–4 (A)	17 August 2025	
(England) Shumaira Mheuka	Chelsea U21s	Manchester City U21s	3–1 (H)	18 August 2025	
(Belgium) Trey Samuel-Ogunsuyi	Sunderland U21s	Tottenham Hotspur U21s	3–5 (H)	18 August 2025	
(England) Zach Marsh	Crystal Palace U21s	Tottenham Hotspur U21s	2–3 (A)	22 August 2025	
(England) Luca Williams-Barnett	Tottenham Hotspur U21s	Leicester City U21s	3–6 (A)	19 September 2025	
(Scotland) Josh Landers	West Ham United U21s	Brighton & Hove Albion U21s	3–3 (H)	26 September 2025	
(Wales) Gabriele Biancheri	Manchester United U21s	Tottenham Hotspur U21s	4–1 (H)	25 October 2025	
(Honduras) Keyrol Figueroa	Liverpool U21s	Everton U21s	4–1 (H)	26 October 2025	
(England) Shumaira Mheuka	Chelsea U21s	Crystal Palace U21s	4–1 (H)	10 January 2026	
(Northern Ireland) Kieran Morrison	Liverpool U21s	Arsenal U21s	7–0 (H)	17 January 2026	
(England) Cruz Ibeh	Middlesbrough U21s	Ipswich Town U21s	6–1 (H)	18 January 2026	
(Republic of Ireland) Sean Patton	Reading U21s	Blackburn Rovers U21s	4–1 (H)	19 January 2026	
(England) Kadan Young	Aston Villa U21s	Ipswich Town U21s	5–4 (H)	24 January 2026	
(Germany) Floyd Samba	Manchester City U21s	Stoke City U21s	1–6 (A)	30 January 2026	
(Netherlands) Demiane Agustien	Arsenal U21s	Leeds United U21s	0–4 (A)	1 February 2026	
(England) Shea Lacey	Manchester United U21s	West Bromwich Albion U21s	1–4 (A)	2 February 2026	
(England) Matheos Ferreira	Newcastle United U21s	Aston Villa U21s	3–4 (A)	6 February 2026	
(England) Reece Evans	Reading U21s	Stoke City U21s	3–0 (H)	7 February 2026	
(Denmark) Chido Obi^{4}	Manchester United U21s	Leicester City U21s	1–4 (A)	23 February 2026	
(England) Jack Daley	Middlesbrough U21s	Stoke City U21s	6–1 (H)	13 March 2026	
(England) Jack Bray	West Bromwich Albion U21s	Birmingham City U21s	4–0 (H)	13 March 2026	
(Northern Ireland) Braiden Graham^{4}	Everton U21s	Ipswich Town U21s	8–4 (H)	17 April 2026	

(H) – Home; (A) – Away
^{4} – player scored 4 goals

== Awards ==
=== Player of the Month ===
Month	Player	Club	Ref.
August	(England) Shumaira Mheuka	Chelsea U21s	
September	(England) Lucá Williams-Barnett	Tottenham Hotspur U21s	
October	(United States) Brandon Powell	Blackburn Rovers U21s	
November	(Bangladesh) Farhaan Ali Wahid	Fulham U21s	
January	(Northern Ireland) Kieran Morrison	Liverpool U21s	
February	(England) Joshua Ajala	West Ham United U21s	
March	(England) Ryan Kavuma-McQueen	Chelsea U21s	

=== Player of the Season ===
Player	Club	Ref.
(England) Shumaira Mheuka	Chelsea U21s	

== Professional Development League ==
Professional Development League 2
- Season: 2025–26
- Dates: 8 August 2025 – 21 April 2026
- Champions: Huddersfield Town U21s (2nd Title)
- Regular Season Champions: Brentford U21s (1st Title)
- Matches: 295 (280 R, 15 P)
- Goals: 1,134 (3.84 per match) (1084 R, 50 P)
- Top goalscorer: (England) Adam Moseley (Wigan Athletic U21s) (23 Goals)
- Biggest home win: Swansea City U21s 6–0 Huddersfield Town U21s (24 August 2025); Watford U21s 6–0 Colchester United U21s (4 November 2025); Wigan Athletic U21s 7–1 Coventry City U21s (10 February 2026); Charlton Athletic U21s 6–0 Swansea City U21s (24 February 2026); Watford U21s 6–0 Coventry City U21s (27 March 2025)
- Biggest away win: Coventry City U21s 0–9 Wigan Athletic U21s (21 October 2025)
- Highest scoring: Sheffield Wednesday U21s 6–8 Huddersfield Town U21s (20 February 2026)
- Longest winning run: 8 games Sheffield United U21s (24 August 2025 – 14 October 2025)
- Longest unbeaten run: 14 games Huddersfield Town U21s (20 February 2026 – Present)
- Longest winless run: 12 games Crewe Alexandra U21s (1 September 2025 – 20 January 2026)
- Longest losing run: 5 games Huddersfield Town U21s (11 August 2025 – 9 September 2025); Sheffield Wednesday U21s (24 October 2025 – 25 November 2025); Coventry City U21s (27 February 2026 – 27 March 2026); Colchester United U21s (20 March 2026 – 10 April 2026)
- All statistics correct as of 21 April 2026.

The Professional Development League, sometimes known as the Professional Development League 2, is Under-21 football's second tier, designed for those academies with Category 2 status. The league, previously split regionally into north and south divisions, is now a single table with teams playing a geographically aligned fixture schedule. The sides that finished in the top eight positions at the end of the season progressed to a playoff stage against Premier League 2 opposition. Brentford U21s are the defending champions.

20 teams competed in the league this season, two fewer than the previous season. Three teams joined with Category One status with Birmingham City U21s, Burnley U21s returning after a three-season absence and six total seasons and founding member Ipswich Town U21s playing in the Premier League 2 for the very first time after 13 seasons. However, Huddersfield Town U21s returned after being granted Category Two academy status after 7 years.

=== Table ===
Pos	Team	Pld	W	D	L	GF	GA	GD	Pts	Qualification
1	Brentford U21s (Note: Brentford were deducted three points breaching PDL Rules regarding the number of substitution occasions.) (R)	28	18	4	6	67	34	+33	55	Qualification for PL2/PDL Playoffs
2	Sheffield United U21s	28	15	7	6	58	39	+19	52	Qualification for PL2/PDL Playoffs
3	AFC Bournemouth U21s	28	16	2	10	67	47	+20	50	Qualification for PL2/PDL Playoffs
4	Swansea City U21s	28	14	6	8	69	50	+19	48	Qualification for PL2/PDL Playoffs
5	Peterborough United U21s	28	14	6	8	66	52	+14	48	Qualification for PL2/PDL Playoffs
6	Huddersfield Town U21s (C)	28	14	6	8	59	50	+9	48	Qualification for PL2/PDL Playoffs
7	Watford U21s	28	12	9	7	69	53	+16	45	Qualification for PL2/PDL Playoffs
8	Charlton Athletic U21s	28	11	7	10	58	49	+9	40	Qualification for PL2/PDL Playoffs
9	Cardiff City U21s	28	11	7	10	48	39	+9	40	
10	Wigan Athletic U21s	28	11	5	12	67	58	+9	38	
11	Hull City U21s	28	10	7	11	49	53	−4	37	
12	Barnsley U21s	28	10	7	11	51	58	−7	37	
13	Millwall U21s	28	11	3	14	48	52	−4	36	
14	Bristol City U21s	28	10	5	13	45	54	−9	35	
15	Coventry City U21s	28	11	2	15	46	63	−17	35	
16	Queens Park Rangers U21s	28	8	9	11	51	61	−10	33	
17	Sheffield Wednesday U21s	28	8	6	14	49	63	−14	30	
18	Colchester United U21s	28	6	6	16	40	77	−37	24	
19	Fleetwood Town U21s	28	5	8	15	36	63	−27	23	
20	Crewe Alexandra U21s	28	5	8	15	41	69	−28	23	

Source: Professional Development League table
(C) Champions; (R) Regional League Champions

=== Matches ===
Home \ Away	BOU	BAR	BRE	BRI	CAR	CHA	COL	COV	CRE	FLE	HUD	HUL	MIL	PET	QPR	SHU	SHW	SWA	WIG	WAT
AFC Bournemouth U21s	—	1–0	2–3	5–0	2–2	4–1	4–1	—	3–2	—	3–0	—	4–0	0–1	1–4	—	3–0	4–1	—	1–0
Barnsley U21s	—	—	1–2	—	1–1	—	4–0	2–1	1–0	4–2	2–3	2–0	—	3–4	2–3	2–2	2–2	—	2–7	0–3
Brentford U21s	2–3	—	—	1–0	4–0	2–1	4–1	3–0	—	6–1	—	1–1	1–2	—	4–0	1–3	—	2–2	4–0	4–0
Bristol City U21s	4–0	2–2	2–1	—	3–1	1–2	3–1	—	3–4	—	1–1	—	1–4	1–2	2–0	—	2–1	1–1	—	2–2
Cardiff City U21s	1–2	—	4–0	2–1	—	1–0	4–1	0–2	—	2–1	—	1–2	4–0	—	2–3	1–1	—	0–1	1–2	2–5
Charlton Athletic U21s	1–0	1–1	1–1	1–2	0–3	—	2–2	—	3–3	—	1–2	—	2–0	5–2	2–2	—	5–0	6–0	—	3–1
Colchester United U21s	2–1	—	2–3	0–3	1–1	2–2	—	3–2	—	1–1	—	2–2	0–6	—	1–1	2–4	—	3–1	4–1	5–2
Coventry City U21s	3–2	1–1	—	2–0	—	2–3	—	—	3–2	1–2	0–2	2–3	1–4	1–2	—	1–0	2–1	0–1	0–9	—
Crewe Alexandra U21s	—	5–2	0–3	—	0–3	—	2–0	0–4	—	1–1	0–5	3–2	—	3–3	1–1	2–3	1–1	—	1–3	2–3
Fleetwood Town U21s	2–6	1–2	—	3–0	—	0–2	—	0–5	2–0	—	1–3	1–1	3–2	3–1	—	1–1	3–3	0–1	0–0	—
Huddersfield Town U21s	—	0–2	1–2	—	2–2	—	0–2	2–1	1–1	1–0	—	2–1	—	4–1	3–2	0–1	4–1	—	2–2	1–1
Hull City U21s	0–4	0–2	—	4–1	—	2–4	—	2–4	4–1	4–1	2–2	—	1–0	4–1	—	2–2	1–2	1–4	2–1	—
Millwall U21s	3–1	0–4	2–3	2–1	1–1	2–4	4–0	—	2–3	—	2–0	—	—	1–2	2–1	—	1–1	2–5	—	2–0
Peterborough United U21s	—	5–1	1–1	—	1–4	—	2–1	1–1	5–0	2–0	2–4	2–3	—	—	2–2	6–1	3–0	—	4–0	3–3
Queens Park Rangers U21s	5–2	—	0–3	2–2	1–0	2–2	4–3	3–4	—	2–2	—	1–1	2–0	—	—	0–2	—	0–4	2–3	1–1
Sheffield United U21s	2–3	5–2	—	1–2	—	3–1	—	1–0	1–1	2–0	3–1	3–0	2–0	1–3	—	—	2–2	2–2	3–2	—
Sheffield Wednesday U21s	—	4–0	1–2	—	1–2	—	3–0	1–2	3–0	4–1	6–8	0–2	—	2–1	2–6	0–1	—	—	2–1	3–3
Swansea City U21s	4–2	2–3	0–3	4–1	1–1	3–0	5–0	—	3–2	—	6–0	—	1–1	1–2	3–1	—	5–1	—	—	2–2
Wigan Athletic U21s	1–2	1–1	—	2–3	—	3–2	—	7–1	1–1	5–3	2–5	2–0	1–2	2–2	—	2–1	0–2	5–2	—	—
Watford U21s	2–2	—	3–1	3–1	0–2	3–1	6–0	6–0	—	1–1	—	2–2	3–1	—	5–0	0–5	—	5–4	4–2	—

Source: Professional Development League Results
Legend: Blue = home team win; Yellow = draw; Red = away team win.

=== PL2/PDL Playoffs ===
Round of 16
PL2-2	Everton U21s (a.e.t.)	3
PDL-7	Watford U21s	2
PDL-1	Brentford U21s	2
PL2-8	Derby County U21s	0
PL2-3	Reading U21s	0
PDL-6	Huddersfield Town U21s	1
PDL-3	AFC Bournemouth U21s	1
PL2-6	Wolverhampton Wanderers U21s	0
PL2-4	Stoke City U21s	1
PDL-5	Peterborough United U21s	3
PL2-1	Nottingham Forest U21s	3
PDL-8	Charlton Athletic U21s	2
PDL-4	Swansea City U21s	2
PL2-5	Newcastle United U21s	0
PDL-2	Sheffield United U21s	1
PL2-7	Norwich City U21s (a.e.t.)	3

Quarter-finals
Everton U21s	4
Brentford U21s	2
Huddersfield Town U21s	4
AFC Bournemouth U21s	1
Peterborough United U21s	0
Nottingham Forest U21s	1
Norwich City U21s	1
Swansea City U21s	0

Semi-finals
Everton U21s	1
Huddersfield Town U21s	3 (a.e.t.)
Nottingham Forest U21s	1
Norwich City U21s	2

Final
Huddersfield Town U21s	4
Norwich City U21s	2

==== Round of 16 ====
24 April 2026
19:00 BST

AFC Bournemouth U21s	1–0	Wolverhampton Wanderers U21s
Bradbury 38' (o.g.)	Report

Testwood Stadium, Totton
Referee: Matthew Scholes

24 April 2026
19:00 BST

Everton U21s	3–2 (a.e.t.)	Watford U21s
Graham 19', 120'; Georgiou 23' (o.g.)	Report 1 Report 2	Massiah-Edwards 45+3'; Moulton 52'

Walton Hall Park, Walton, Liverpool
Attendance: 450
Referee: Matthew McQuillan

27 April 2026
19:00 BST

Brentford U21s	2–0	Derby County U21s
Boni 36'; Grey 43'	Report

Wheatsheaf Park, Staines
Referee: Stephen Parkinson

27 April 2026
19:00 BST

Nottingham Forest U21s	3–2	Charlton Athletic U21s
Sinclair 11'; McClure 68'; McNeilly 90+5'	Report	Fullah 8'; Mitchell 72'

Loughborough University Stadium, Loughborough
Referee: Gareth Thomas

27 April 2026
19:00 BST

Reading U21s	0–1	Huddersfield Town U21s
	Report	Smith-Sway 20' (pen.)

Cherrywood Road, Farnborough
Referee: Sam Mulhall

27 April 2026
19:00 BST

Sheffield United U21s	1–3 (a.e.t.)	Norwich City U21s
Sasnauskas 9'	Report	Towler 78'; Mundle-Smith 116'; Glossop 120'

Bramall Lane, Sheffield
Referee: Dean Watson

27 April 2026
19:00 BST

Stoke City U21s	1–3	Peterborough United U21s
Maskall 35'	Report	Agbinone 21'; Fox 89'; Sykut 90+1'

Bet365 Stadium, Stoke-on-Trent
Referee: Aaron Jackson

27 April 2026
19:00 BST

Swansea City U21s	2–0	Newcastle United U21s
Woodward 19'; McKenzie 29'	Report

Swansea.com Stadium, Swansea
Referee: Greg Rollason

==== Quarterfinals ====
1 May 2026
19:00 BST

Everton U21s	4–2	Brentford U21s
Davis 44'; Akarakiri 63'; Graham 69', 81'	Report 1 Report 2	Picotto 8'; Laidlaw 87'

Walton Hall Park, Walton, Liverpool
Attendance: 131
Referee: Greg Rollason

2 May 2026
19:00 BST

Norwich City U21s	1–0	Swansea City U21s
Adelusi 90+5'	Report

Carrow Road, Norwich
Attendance: 112
Referee: Aaron Farmer

4 May 2026
13:00 BST

Huddersfield Town U21s	4–1	AFC Bournemouth U21s
Bevan 13' (o.g.); Onyeka 16'; Togo 48'; Sebine 65'	Report	Day 41'

Kirklees Stadium, Huddersfield
Attendance: 444
Referee: James Westgate

4 May 2026
13:00 BST

Peterborough United U21s	0–1	Nottingham Forest U21s
	Report 1 Report 2	Smith 86'

London Road Stadium, Peterborough
Attendance: 247
Referee: Callum Walchester

==== Semifinals ====
11 May 2026
19:00 BST

Huddersfield Town U21s	3–1 (a.e.t.)	Everton U21s
Smith-Sway 40'; Spencer 103', 108'	Report	Togo 45' (o.g.)

Kirklees Stadium, Huddersfield
Attendance: 842
Referee: Niall Smith

11 May 2026
19:00

Nottingham Forest U21s	1–2	Norwich City U21s
Smith 16'	Report	Glossop 57'; Forbes 70'

City Ground, West Bridgford
Attendance: 984
Referee: Stephen Parkinson

==== Final ====
15 May 2026
19:00 BST

Norwich City U21s	2–4	Huddersfield Town U21s
Jones 29'; Forbes 74'	Report	Smith-Sway 48', 90+7' (pen.); Spencer 88'; Sebine 90'

Carrow Road, Norwich
Attendance: 537
Referee: Harry Wager

=== Top goalscorers ===
As of 4 May 2026

Rank	Player	Club	Goals
1	(England) Adam Moseley	Wigan Athletic U21s	23
2	(Wales) Morgan Bates	Swansea City U21s	20
3	(England) Jonny Day	AFC Bournemouth U21s	15
3	(Northern Ireland) Devlan Moses	Sheffield Wednesday U21s	15
3	(England) Josh Pescatore	Swansea City U21s	15
6	(Scotland) Ethan Laidlaw	Brentford U21s	14
6	(England) Cole Simms	Wigan Athletic U21s	14
8	(Afghanistan) Amin Nabizada	Watford U21s	12
8	(Wales) Tom Woodward	Swansea City U21s	12
10	(Wales) Will Grainger	Sheffield Wednesday U21s	10
10	(England) Louie Marsh	Sheffield United U21s	10
10	(Republic of Ireland) Nickson Okosun	Watford U21s	10

=== Hat-tricks ===
As of 10 March 2026

Player	For	Against	Result	Date	Ref.
(Scotland) Jevan Beattie	Sheffield United U21s	Watford U21s	0–5 (A)	5 September 2025	
(England) Adam Moseley^{4}	Wigan Athletic U21s	Swansea City U21s	5–2 (H)	16 September 2025	
(England) Louie Marsh	Sheffield United U21s	Barnsley U21s	5–2 (H)	14 October 2025	
(England) Adam Moseley^{4}	Wigan Athletic U21s	Coventry City U21s	0–9 (A)	21 October 2025	
(England) Cole Simms	Wigan Athletic U21s	Coventry City U21s	0–9 (A)	21 October 2025	
(England) Adam Moseley^{4}	Wigan Athletic U21s	Barnsley U21s	2–7 (A)	17 November 2025	
(England) Jaydon Thomas-Smith	Millwall U21s	Colchester United U21s	0–6 (A)	9 January 2026	
(England) Conrad Ambursley	Coventry City U21s	Hull City U21s	2–4 (A)	20 January 2026	
(England) George Sebine	Huddersfield Town U21s	Peterborough United U21s	2–4 (A)	3 February 2026	
(Republic of Ireland) Nickson Okosun	Watford U21s	Queens Park Rangers U21s	5–0 (H)	3 February 2026	
(Northern Ireland) Devlan Moses	Sheffield Wednesday U21s	Huddersfield Town U21s	6–8 (H)	20 February 2026	
(Jamaica) Kaheim Dixon	Charlton Athletic U21s	Swansea City U21s	6–0 (H)	24 February 2026	
(Wales) Morgan Bates	Swansea City U21s	Queens Park Rangers U21s	3–1 (H)	2 March 2026	
(Northern Ireland) Devlan Moses	Sheffield Wednesday U21s	Fleetwood Town U21s	3–3 (A)	10 March 2026	
(Scotland) Ethan Laidlaw	Brentford U21s	Fleetwood Town U21s	6–1 (H)	31 March 2026	
(Ecuador) Malcom Dacosta Gonzalez	AFC Bournemouth U21s	Fleetwood Town U21s	2–6 (A)	7 April 2026	

Note

(H) – Home; (A) – Away
^{4} – player scored 4 goals
