= Shim Mheuka =

English footballer (born 2007)

Personal information
- Full name: Shumaira Zion Mheuka
- Date of birth: 20 October 2007 (age 19)
- Place of birth: Birmingham, England
- Height: 1.83 m (6 ft 0 in)
- Position: Forward

Team information
- Current team: Celtic (on loan from Chelsea)
- Number: 29

Youth career
- 2017–2022: Brighton & Hove Albion
- 2022–2024: Chelsea

Senior career*
Years	Team	Apps	(Gls)
2024–	Chelsea	2	(0)
2026–	→ Celtic (loan)	7	(0)

International career^{‡}
2022	England U15	4	(2)
2022–2023	England U16	12	(4)
2023–2024	England U17	10	(6)
2024	England U18	2	(0)
2024–	England U19	23	(16)
2026–	England U20	5	(4)
- * Club domestic league appearances and goals as of 23:00, 1 November 2026 (UTC) ‡ National team caps and goals as of 18:41, 16 November 2026 (UTC)

Shumaira Zion "Shim" Mheuka (born 20 October 2007) is an English professional footballer who plays as a forward for Scottish Premiership club Celtic, on loan from Premier League club Chelsea.

== Club career ==
=== Early career ===
Born in England to Zimbabwean parents, Mheuka joined Brighton & Hove Albion at the age of nine. He was educated at Ardingly College. He progressed through Brighton & Hove Albion's academy, making his under-18 debut at just fourteen years old.

=== Chelsea ===
In July 2022, Mheuka signed with fellow Premier League club Chelsea. He made his debut for Chelsea's under-18 team in a 2–1 win over West Bromwich Albion in October 2022.

On 12 December 2024, Mheuka made his first-team debut for Chelsea, coming on as a second-half substitute in their UEFA Conference League tie against Astana in Kazakhstan. His Premier League debut came on 25 February 2025 as a late substitute against Southampton.

On 6 March 2025, Mheuka made history as the youngest player to start for Chelsea in a European competition in a 2–1 away victory over Copenhagen.

==== Celtic (loan) ====
On 2 September 2026, Mheuka signed a new five-year deal with Chelsea, before being loaned to Scottish Premiership club Celtic until the end of the season. Mheuka made his debut later that day, coming on as a substitute in a 3–0 victory over Aberdeen.

== International career ==
Mheuka has represented England at under-15 and under-16 level. He remains eligible to represent Zimbabwe at international level.

On 6 September 2023, Mheuka made his England U17 debut and scored during a 3–2 defeat to Portugal at the Pinatar Arena. He was included in the squad for the 2024 UEFA European Under-17 Championship and scored during the last group game against Spain. He also started in their quarter-final elimination against Italy.

On 4 September 2024, Mheuka made his England U18 debut during a 2–2 draw with Portugal at the Lafarge Foot Avenir.

On 9 October 2024, Mheuka made his U19 debut during a 2–1 defeat to Portugal in Marbella. He was a member of England's squad at the 2025 UEFA European Under-19 Championship.

On 29 September 2026, Mheuka scored on his debut for England U20 against France in the 2026–27 Under 20 Elite League.

== Personal life ==
=== Family ===
His father, Malcolm, was born in Dangamvura, Mutare, Zimbabwe, and played as an attacking midfielder for the Zimbabwe Saints and Circle Cement in the Zimbabwe Premier Soccer League. His younger brother, Tendah, plays for the academy of Brighton & Hove Albion.

=== Sponsorship ===
Mheuka is sponsored by German sportswear manufacturer Adidas.

== Career statistics ==
As of match played 2 September 2026

Appearances and goals by club, season and competition
Club	Season	League			National cup (Note: Includes FA Cup)		League cup (Note: Includes EFL Cup)		Europe		Other		Total	
Club	Season	Division	Apps	Goals	Apps	Goals	Apps	Goals	Apps	Goals	Apps	Goals	Apps	Goals
Chelsea U21	2024–25	—			—		—		—		3 (Note: Appearance(s) in EFL Trophy)	0	3	0
Chelsea U21	2025–26	—			—		—		—		1	1	1	1
Chelsea U21	Total		—		—		—		—		4	1	4	1
Chelsea	2024–25	Premier League	1	0	0	0	0	0	4 (Note: Appearances in UEFA Conference League)	0	0	0	5	0
Chelsea	2025–26	Premier League	1	0	1	0	2	0	0	0	—		4	0
Chelsea	Total		2	0	1	0	2	0	4	0	0	0	9	0
Celtic (loan)	2026–27	Scottish Premiership	1	0	0	0	0	0	0	0	—		1	0
Career total			3	0	1	0	2	0	4	0	4	1	14	1

== Honours ==
Chelsea U18

- U18 Premier League Southern Champion: 2023–24

Chelsea U21

- Premier League 2: 2025–26

Chelsea

- UEFA Conference League: 2024–25
- FA Cup runner-up: 2025–26

Individual

- Premier League 2 Player of the Season: 2025–26
