= Ethan Laidlaw (footballer) =

Scottish footballer

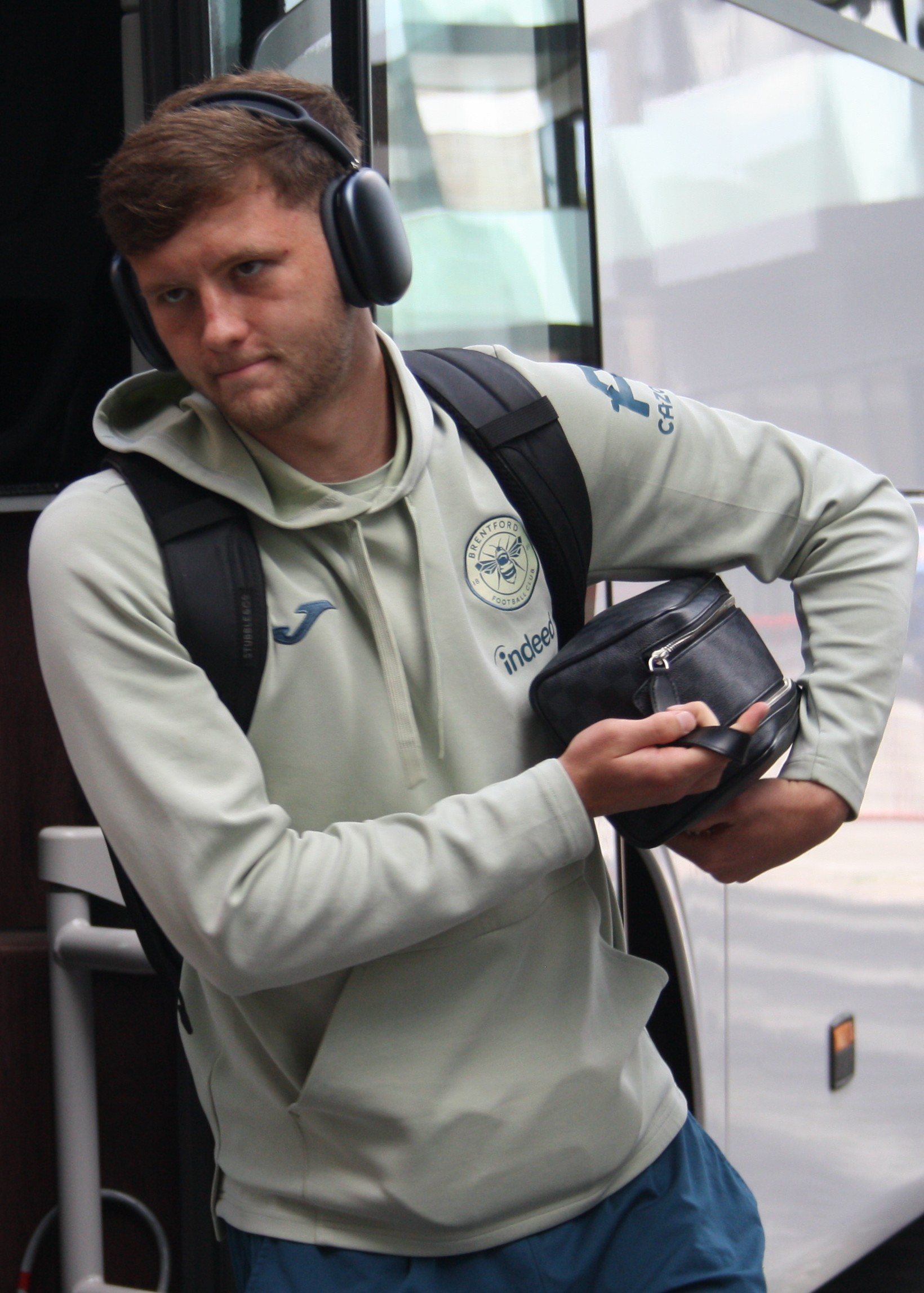
- Laidlaw while with Brentford B in 2026

Personal information
- Full name: Ethan James Laidlaw
- Date of birth: 2 January 2005 (age 21)
- Place of birth: Edinburgh, Scotland
- Height: 1.78 m (5 ft 10 in)
- Position: Forward

Team information
- Current team: Falkirk
- Number: 12

Youth career
- –2013: Longniddry Villa
- 2013–2023: Hibernian
- 2023–2026: Brentford

Senior career*
Years	Team	Apps	(Gls)
2026–	Falkirk	1	(0)

International career
2021–2022	Scotland U17	6	(3)
2022	Scotland U18	2	(0)
2023–2024	Scotland U19	4	(0)
- * Club domestic league appearances and goals as of 15:43, 15 August 2026 (UTC)

Ethan James Laidlaw (born 2 January 2005) is a Scottish professional footballer who plays as a forward for Scottish Premiership club Falkirk.

Laidlaw is a product of the Hibernian academy and began his professional career with the club. He transferred to Brentford in 2023, for whom he exclusively played B team football until beginning his senior career with Falkirk in 2026. Laidlaw was capped by Scotland at youth level.

== Club career ==
=== Hibernian ===
A forward, Laidlaw began his youth career at Longniddry Villa, under the coaching of his father. He entered the Hibernian academy at age 8. Laidlaw was a part of the U14 squad which won the 2018 Foyle Cup and progressed through the academy to sign his first professional contract in February 2021. He was an unused substitute during seven first team matches between April 2021 and January 2023. Laidlaw made two Scottish Challenge Cup appearances for the B team and was a part of the 2021–22 SPFL Development League-winning squad, which subsequently entered the 2022–23 UEFA Youth League. He turned down a new contract and departed Easter Road when his existing contract expired at the end of the 2022–23 season.

=== Brentford ===
On 28 July 2023, Laidlaw transferred to the B team at Premier League club Brentford and signed a two-year contract, with the option of a further year, for an undisclosed "six-figure" fee. Though he was not part of the 2024–25 Professional U21 Development League Final-winning matchday squad, Laidlaw received a winner's medal in recognition of his contribution earlier in the competition. Often injured with "little niggles and bits that just take him out of his stride" during his first two seasons with the club, the option on Laidlaw's contract was taken up for the 2025–26 season. He was an unused substitute during a first team pre-season friendly. Deployed centrally and out wide, Laidlaw scored 15 B team goals and was part of the squad which finished as regular season champions of the Professional U21 Development League. For his performances, he was voted the club's U21 Players' Player of the Year. Laidlaw turned down the offer of a new contract and transferred out of the club in June 2026.

=== Falkirk ===
On 9 June 2026, Laidlaw transferred to Scottish Premiership club Falkirk and signed a two-year contract, with the option of a further year, for an undisclosed fee. He made five appearances early in the 2026–27 season, prior to suffering a rolled ankle in training on 5 August, which required surgery.

== International career ==
Laidlaw was capped by Scotland at U17, U18 and U19 levels. He scored a hat-trick on his international debut and was a part of the Scotland's 2022 UEFA European U17 Championship squad.

== Personal life ==
Laidlaw is the son of former Scottish League footballer Steven Laidlaw and his brothers Keir and Josh also became footballers. He grew up in Port Seton and attended Preston Lodge High School. Laidlaw is a Hibernian supporter and served the club as a ball boy.

== Career statistics ==
As of match played 15 August 2026

Appearances and goals by club, season and competition
Club	Season	League			Scottish Cup		League Cup		Other		Total	
Club	Season	Division	Apps	Goals	Apps	Goals	Apps	Goals	Apps	Goals	Apps	Goals
Hibernian B	2021–22	—							1 (Note: Appearance in Scottish Challenge Cup)	0	1	0
Hibernian B	2022–23	—							1	1	1	1
Hibernian B	Total		—						2	1	2	1
Falkirk	2026–27	Scottish Premiership	1	0	0	0	4	0	—		5	0
Career total			1	0	0	0	4	0	2	1	7	1

== Honours ==
- Brentford U21 Players' Player of the Year: 2025–26
