= FC Rukh Lviv junior squads and academy =

Rukh Lviv juniors
- Full name: Youth team of FC Rukh Lviv (U21/U19)
- Ground: Stadion imeni Bohdana Markevycha; Vynnyky, Lviv Oblast
- Capacity: 900
- President: Hryhoriy Kozlovskyi
- League: Youth Championship
- Website: https://fcruhlviv.com/club-pages/pro-akademiyu

The FC Rukh Lviv junior squads and academy is a football academy and the club's junior squads of Ukrainian professional football club Rukh Lviv.

Rukh Lviv has two junior teams (squads) that participate in the junior championships of the Ukrainian Premier League. There were some additional reserve teams that competed in lower leagues (Rukh-2). Four more teams from the club's academy participate in the Ukrainian Youth Football League which is a separate national football league not associated with the Ukrainian Premier League. The Ukrainian Youth Football League is designed for football academies and sports schools.

== Brief history ==
The academy of FC Rukh was established in 2018 with the construction of a sports complex around the Vynnyky city lake.

In 2020, Rukh created its reserve teams, including under-21 and under-19. Following the 2020–21 season, the competition among under-21 teams was discontinued, and both squads were merged. In 2022, the Rukh under-19 team qualified for the UEFA Youth League, becoming third in Ukraine after Shakhtar and Dynamo. Rukh has made their debut at the UEFA Youth League by conditionally hosting Zagłębie Lubin on September 14, 2022. Ruslan Nepeypiyev became the first player to score for Rukh in the UEFA Youth League competitions.

=== UEFA Youth League ===
As of match played 10 December 2025

Season	Round	Opponent	Home	Away
2022–23	First round	(Poland) Zagłębie Lubin	1–0	0–0
2022–23	Second round	(Turkey) Galatasaray	3–1	3–1
2022–23	Knockout round play-offs	(Italy) Inter Milan	1–1 (a.e.t.) (4–3 p)	—
2022–23	Round of 16	(Italy) Milan	—	0–1
2023–24	First round	(Bosnia and Herzegovina) Sarajevo	1–1	3–1
2023–24	Second round	(Denmark) Midtjylland	0–4	1–0

== Honours ==
- Ukrainian Under-19 Championship
  - Winners (2): (2021–22), 2022–23

== Current squad ==
As of 16 June 2024

Note: Flags indicate national team as defined under FIFA eligibility rules; some limited exceptions apply. Players may hold more than one non-FIFA nationality.

No.	Pos.	Nation	Player
1	GK	UKR	Yuriy Hereta
12	GK	UKR	Markiyan Bakus
62	GK	UKR	Svyatoslav Vanivskyi
4	DF	UKR	Vitaliy Kholod
45	DF	UKR	Oleksandr Hereha
67	DF	UKR	Milan Mykhalchuk
75	DF	UKR	Andriy Kitela
76	DF	UKR	Oleksiy Tovarnytskyi
86	DF	UKR	Illya Popovskyi
94	DF	UKR	Denys Hryshkevych
19	MF	UKR	Yevheniy Pastukh
48	MF	UKR	Viktor Nikolayev

No.	Pos.	Nation	Player
56	MF	UKR	Maksym Boyko
70	MF	UKR	Nazar Kasarda
71	MF	UKR	Oleh Fedor
72	MF	UKR	Roman Dobryanskyi
84	MF	UKR	Artur Fedor
87	MF	UKR	Nazar Rusyak
89	MF	UKR	Andriy Stolyarchuk
47	FW	UKR	Kostyantyn Kvas
64	FW	UKR	Svyatoslav Botskiv
68	FW	UKR	Serhiy Panchenko
85	FW	UKR	Taras Shtokal
98	FW	UKR	Denys Shayda

== See also ==
- FC Rukh-2 Lviv
