= Elias Maluvunu =

Swiss footballer (born 2004)

Personal information
- Date of birth: 3 August 2004 (age 22)
- Place of birth: Bern, Switzerland
- Height: 1.82 m (6 ft 0 in)
- Position: Winger

Team information
- Current team: Winterthur
- Number: 37

Youth career
- FC Wabern
- 2020–2022: Young Boys

Senior career*
Years	Team	Apps	(Gls)
2022–2024	Young Boys U21	60	(7)
2024	Winterthur U21	4	(4)
2024–	Winterthur	39	(6)
2025	→ Schaffhausen (loan)	19	(2)

International career^{‡}
2019	Switzerland U15	3	(0)
2019	Switzerland U16	2	(0)
2022	Switzerland U19	2	(0)
- * Club domestic league appearances and goals as of 28 September 2026 ‡ National team caps and goals as of 02:12, 26 October 2025 (UTC)

Elias Maluvunu (born 3 August 2004) is a Swiss professional footballer who plays as a winger for Swiss Super League club Winterthur.

== Club career ==
Maluvunu is a product of the academies of the Swiss clubs FC Wabern and Young Boys, before getting promoted to Young Boys' U21 side in the Swiss Promotion League in 2022. On 28 May 2024, he signed his first professional contract with Winterthur. On 1 January 2025, he joined Schaffhausen on loan in the Swiss Challenge League for the second half of the 2024–25 season.

== International career ==
Born in Switzerland, Maluvunu is of DR Congolese descent. He is a youth international for Switzerland, having played up to the Switzerland U19s in 2022.
