= Tom Kerssens =

Dutch football player

Personal information
- Date of birth: 2 April 2004 (age 22)
- Place of birth: Alkmaar
- Position: Midfielder

Team information
- Current team: AFC '34

Youth career
- -2021: AZ Alkmaar

Senior career*
Years	Team	Apps	(Gls)
2021-2024	Jong AZ	23	(1)
2025	FC Twente	0	(0)
2025-	AFC '34		
- * Club domestic league appearances and goals as of 00:15, 30 December 2025 (UTC)

Tom Kerssens (born 2 April 2004) is a Dutch footballer who plays for AFC '34 as a midfielder.

== Career ==
From North Holland, Kerssens signed his first professional contract with AZ Alkmaar in June 2021. He spoke of his pride at this as he is local to Alkmaar and has been a fan of the club since he was 5 years old. He was part of the as the AZ under-18 side that won a league and cup double in the 2021–22 season. He played in the 2022-23 UEFA Youth League final against Hajduk Split as AZ ran out 5–0 winners.

Kerssens made his Eerste Divisie debut on the 18 March 2022, away at Jong FC Utrecht. In February 2024, he had to play as an emergency goalkeeper for Jong AZ in the Eerste Divisie after regular goalkeeper Kiyani Zeggen suffered a hand injury and the team had no remaining substitutes. He kept a clean sheet as the team secured a 1–0 victory over Roda JC. Earlier in the match, Kerssens had also scored the only goal of the game. He opted to leave the club at the end of the 2023–2024 season despite having the offer of an extra year, because he felt his route to the first team was limited.

Kerssens had a trial at Vitesse Arnhem, and scored the winning goal in the 2-1 friendly against Greek side PAOK, but the club were not sure of their finances and he was not able to agree a contract. He also had a trial with FC Utrecht, prior to signing with FC Twente in January 2025. He played for the combined reserves of Twente and Heracles without making a first team appearance.

In the summer of 2025 he returned to his hometown to play for AFC '34. Although initially sidelined by a knee injury, he made his debut for the club in October 2025.
