= Loek Postma =

Dutch footballer (born 2003)

Personal information
- Date of birth: 5 March 2003 (age 23)
- Place of birth: Uitgeest, The Netherlands
- Height: 1.85 m (6 ft 1 in)
- Position: Centre-back

Team information
- Current team: RKC Waalwijk
- Number: 35

Youth career
- –2014: FC Uitgeest
- 2014–2021: Alkmaar

Senior career*
Years	Team	Apps	(Gls)
2021–2024	Jong AZ	50	(1)
2024–2025	Vitesse	18	(0)
2025–	RKC Waalwijk	29	(0)

International career^{‡}
2017–2018	Netherlands U15	3	(0)
- * Club domestic league appearances and goals as of 25 April 2026 ‡ National team caps and goals as of 17 February 2018

Loek Postma (born 5 March 2003) is a Dutch professional footballer who plays as a centre-back for Eerste Divisie club RKC Waalwijk.

== Career ==
Postma moved from his home-town club FC Uitgeest to the academy of AZ in 2014. He was awarded his first professional contract with AZ in June 2021. The deal was for 3 years with the option of a fourth. Postma made his league debut on 22 April 2022 in a 3–3 draw with Excelsior Rotterdam in the Eerste Divisie at the Stadion Woudestein. On 3 November 2023, he scored his first league goal with an injury time equaliser in a 2–2 draw away at VVV Venlo.

On 8 August 2024, Postma signed a two-year contract with Vitesse.

On 21 August 2025, Postma moved to RKC Waalwijk on a three-season deal.
