= Athanasios Dabizas =

Greek footballer (born 2004)

Personal information
- Date of birth: 26 May 2004 (age 22)
- Place of birth: Athens, Greece
- Height: 1.89 m (6 ft 2 in)
- Position: Forward

Team information
- Current team: AEL
- Number: 9

Youth career
- 2012–2025: Panathinaikos

Senior career*
Years	Team	Apps	(Gls)
2022–2024	Panathinaikos B	35	(1)
2024–2025	Panathinaikos	0	(0)
2025–2026	Cerignola	14	(0)
2026–	AEL	1	(1)
- * Club domestic league appearances and goals as of 21 September 2026

Athanasios Dabizas (Greek: Αθανάσιος Νταμπίζας; born 26 May 2004) is a Greek professional footballer who plays as a forward for Super League 2 club AEL.

== Personal life ==
He is the son of Nikos Dabizas.
