= Mexx Meerdink =

Dutch footballer (born 2003)

Personal information
- Date of birth: 24 July 2003 (age 23)
- Place of birth: Winterswijk, Netherlands
- Height: 1.82 m (6 ft 0 in)
- Position: Forward

Team information
- Current team: AZ
- Number: 9

Youth career
- 2012–2021: de Graafschap

Senior career*
| Years | Team | Apps | (Gls) |
| 2021–2025 | Jong AZ | 54 | (14) |
| 2023– | AZ | 66 | (22) |
| 2024 | → Vitesse (loan) | 7 | (0) |

International career^{‡}
| 2026– | Netherlands | 5 | (2) |
- * Club domestic league appearances and goals as of 25 October 2026 ‡ National team caps and goals as of 16 November 2026

Mexx Meerdink (born 24 July 2003) is a Dutch professional footballer who plays as a forward for Eredivisie club AZ and the Netherlands national team.

== Early life ==
From Winterswijk, Meerdink was in the youth academy at de Graafschap from 2012 until 2021 when he signed up to Jong AZ.

== Club career ==
=== 2021: Jong AZ debut ===
Meerdink made his league debut for AZ in the Eerste Divisie on 10 December 2021, appearing as a substitute in a 3–2 away defeat to ADO Den Haag. Meerdink made his first start on 21 January 2022 against VVV Venlo in a youthful team that won 2–0 and in doing so earning the club their first win in four months. As well as Meerdink making a first start, Misha Engel and Lewis Schouten did as well. The oldest starting player for Jong AZ was 22-year-old Czech Richard Sedláček.

=== 2023: AZ debut ===
On 7 March 2023 Meerdink made his debut for AZ in the 2022–23 UEFA Europa Conference League against Lazio triggering a payment between €40,000 And €50,000 to his former club de Graafschap. On 19 March 2023, he made his Eredivisie debut against FC Twente. Meerdink came off the bench to score the winning penalty in a UEFA Europa Conference League quarter-final penalty shoot-out against Anderlecht on 20 April 2023.

On 24 April 2023, Meerdink scored twice in the 2022–23 UEFA Youth League final against Hajduk Split as AZ ran out 5–0 winners.

==== 2024: Vitesse (loan) ====
On 31 January 2024, Meerdink moved on loan to Vitesse until the end of the season.

=== 2024–25: Return to AZ ===
Meerdink returned to his parent club AZ ahead of the 2024–25 campaign. On 30 August 2024, Meerdink scored his first Eredivisie goal in a 3–0 win away at RKC Waalwijk. He played in the final of the KNVB Cup as AZ lost to Go Ahead Eagles on penalties on 21 April 2025. The game had ended 1–1 in normal time after Go Ahead Eagles scored a 98th-minute equaliser. Three days later, Meerdink scored a 97th-minute bicycle kick to secure a 1–1 draw against NAC Breda.

In a 2025–26 UEFA Conference League third-round qualifying match against FC Vaduz, Meerdink scored the third goal in a 3–0 home victory for AZ, wherein he controls a cross-field pass from Mees de Wit and lobs the goalkeeper without letting the ball touch the ground. The "Bergkampesque" goal drew widespread praise from the Dutch media. His manager Maarten Martens would later say of the goal, "this is why [fans] come to the stadium". The strike earned him AZ's Goal of the Year award for 2025.

== International career ==
Meerdink received his first call-up for the Dutch national team in October 2025. However, he sustained an injury in training and withdrew from the squad before he could make his first national team appearance, mirroring the experience of his father Martijn Meerdink 20 years earlier.

In September 2026, he was included again in the senior Netherlands squad, ahead of the start of the 2026–27 UEFA Nations League. He made his debut in a 1–1 draw against Germany on 24 September as a first-half substitute for the injured Brian Brobbey. He scored his first senior international goals for the Netherlands with a brace of goals in a 2–1 win against Serbia on 27 September.

== Personal life ==
He is the son of former AZ professional footballer Martijn Meerdink, who earned one cap for the Dutch national team.

== Career statistics ==
=== Club ===
As of match played 25 October 2026

Appearances and goals by club, season and competition
| Club | Season | League | | | KNVB Cup | | Europe | | Other | | Total | |
| Club | Season | Division | Apps | Goals | Apps | Goals | Apps | Goals | Apps | Goals | Apps | Goals |
|---|---|---|---|---|---|---|---|---|---|---|---|---|
| Jong AZ | 2021–22 | Eerste Divisie | 16 | 2 | — | | — | | — | | 16 | 2 |
| Jong AZ | 2022–23 | Eerste Divisie | 19 | 8 | — | | — | | — | | 19 | 8 |
| Jong AZ | 2023–24 | Eerste Divisie | 17 | 4 | — | | — | | — | | 17 | 4 |
| Jong AZ | 2024–25 | Eerste Divisie | 1 | 0 | — | | — | | — | | 1 | 0 |
| Jong AZ | Total | | 53 | 14 | — | | — | | — | | 53 | 14 |
| AZ | 2022–23 | Eredivisie | 6 | 0 | 0 | 0 | 3 (Note: Appearances in UEFA (Europa) Conference League) | 0 | — | | 9 | 0 |
| AZ | 2023–24 | Eredivisie | 2 | 0 | 0 | 0 | 0 | 0 | — | | 2 | 0 |
| AZ | 2024–25 | Eredivisie | 29 | 13 | 3 | 1 | 8 (Note: Appearances in UEFA Europa League) | 0 | — | | 40 | 14 |
| AZ | 2025–26 | Eredivisie | 19 | 5 | 1 | 0 | 12 | 3 | — | | 32 | 8 |
| AZ | 2026–27 | Eredivisie | 10 | 4 | 0 | 0 | 3 | 2 | 1 (Note: Appearance in Johan Cruyff Shield) | 1 | 14 | 7 |
| AZ | Total | | 66 | 22 | 4 | 1 | 26 | 5 | 1 | 1 | 99 | 29 |
| Vitesse (loan) | 2023–24 | Eredivisie | 7 | 0 | 1 | 0 | — | | — | | 8 | 0 |
| Career total | | | 126 | 36 | 5 | 1 | 26 | 5 | 1 | 1 | 159 | 43 |

=== International ===
As of match played 16 November 2026

Appearances and goals by national team and year
| National team | Year | Apps | Goals |
|---|---|---|---|
| Netherlands | 2026 | 5 | 2 |
| Total | | 5 | 2 |

As of match played 27 September 2026
Scores and results list the Netherlands' goal tally first, score column indicates score after each Meerdink goal

List of international goals scored by Mexx Meerdink
| No. | Date | Venue | Cap | Opponent | Score | Result | Competition |
|---|---|---|---|---|---|---|---|
| 1 | 27 September 2026 | Rajko Mitić Stadium, Belgrade, Serbia | 2 | Serbia | 1–0 | 2–1 | 2026–27 UEFA Nations League A |
| 2 | 27 September 2026 | Rajko Mitić Stadium, Belgrade, Serbia | 2 | Serbia | 2–1 | 2–1 | 2026–27 UEFA Nations League A |

== Honours ==
AZ

- KNVB Cup: 2025–26
- Johan Cruyff Shield: 2026
