= Bilal Mazhar =

Egypt international footballer (born 2003)

Personal information
- Full name: Bilal Mazhar Abdelrahman Abdelgalil
- Date of birth: 21 November 2003 (age 22)
- Place of birth: Châteauroux, France
- Height: 1.83 m (6 ft 0 in)
- Position: Forward

Team information
- Current team: Olympiacos B
- Number: 26

Youth career
- Al Mokawloon
- 2019–2022: Panathinaikos

Senior career*
Years	Team	Apps	(Gls)
2022–2024	Panathinaikos B	47	(11)
2024–2025	Estrela da Amadora	1	(0)
2025	Lamia	10	(0)
2025–	Olympiacos B	21	(4)

International career^{‡}
2023	Egypt U20	3	(0)
2023–2024	Egypt U23	13	(3)
- * Club domestic league appearances and goals as of 20 September 2026 ‡ National team caps and goals as of 20:00, 8 August 2024 (UTC)

Bilal Mazhar Abdelrahman Abdelgalil (Arabic: بلال مظهر عبد الرحمن عبد الجليل; born 21 November 2003) is a professional footballer plays as a forward for Super League Greece 2 club Olympiacos B. Born in France, he represents Egypt at youth level.

== Club career ==
=== Panathinaikos U19 ===
Bilal was the first scorer in the Youth Super League in the 2021–22 season. On 14 September 2022, he became the fourth player to score five goals in a single match in the history of UEFA Youth League. That match ended with an 8–0 victory over PFC Slavia Sofia, during the 2022–23 season.

=== Estrela da Amadora ===
On 31 August 2024, Mazhar signed a two-year contract with Estrela da Amadora in Portugal.

== International career ==
Born in France, Bilal is of Egyptian descent. He was called up to represent the Egypt U20s for the 2023 Africa U-20 Cup of Nations.

== Personal life ==
He is the son of former Egyptian international Mazhar Abdel Rahman.

== Career statistics ==
As of 20 March 2024

Club	Season	League			Cup		Continental		Total	
Club	Season	Division	Apps	Goals	Apps	Goals	Apps	Goals	Apps	Goals
Panathinaikos B	2021–22	Super League Greece 2	5	0	—		—		5	0
Panathinaikos B	2022–23	Super League Greece 2	18	6	—		—		18	6
Panathinaikos B	2023–24	Super League Greece 2	21	4	—		—		21	4
Career total			44	10	0	0	0	0	44	10
