= 2022–23 UEFA Youth League =

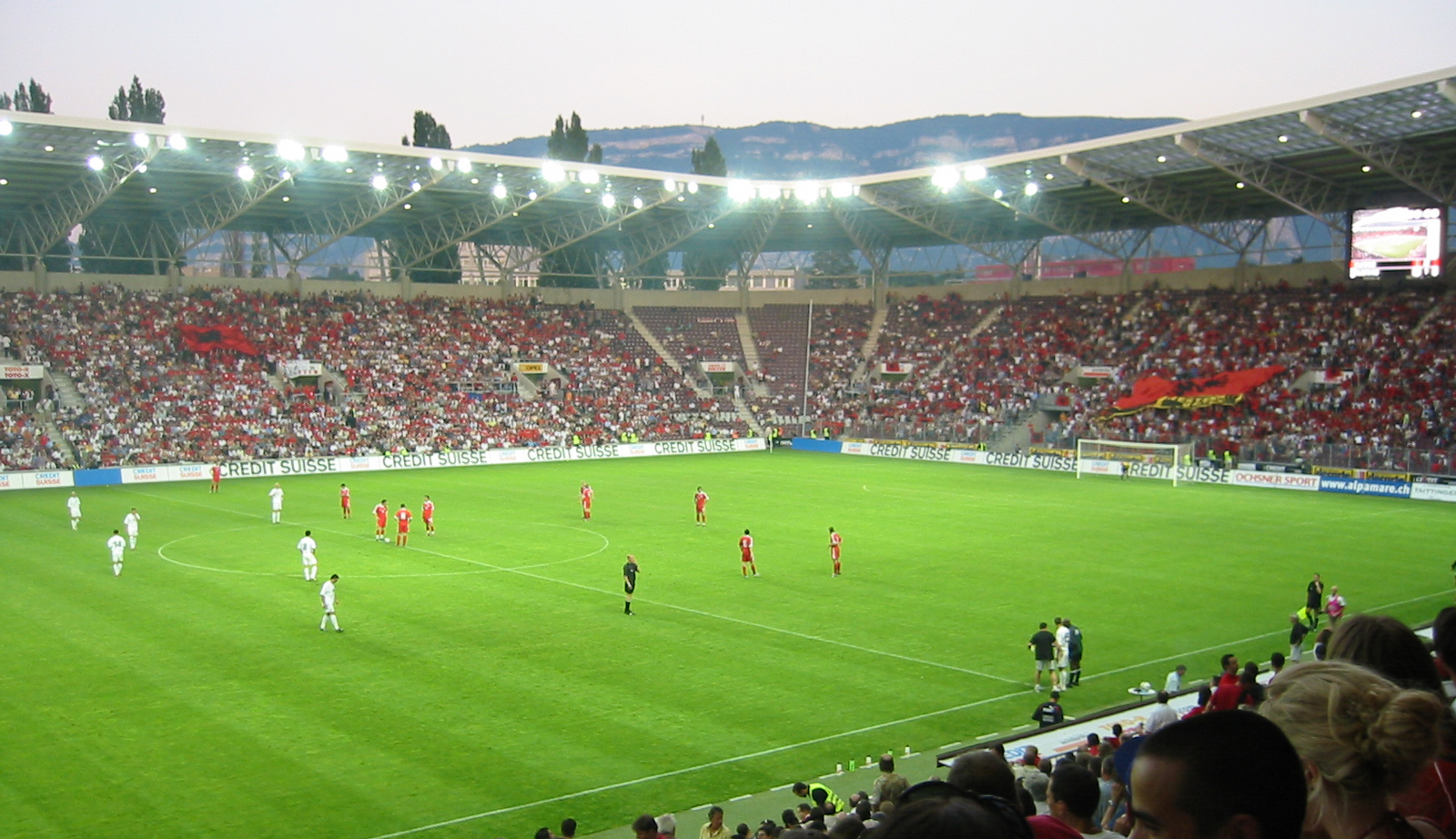
- The Stade de Genève in Geneva hosted the semi-finals and final

Tournament details
- Dates: 6 September 2022 – 24 April 2023
- Teams: 64 (from 39 associations)

Final positions
- Champions: (Netherlands) AZ (1st title)
- Runners-up: (Croatia) Hajduk Split

Tournament statistics
- Matches played: 167
- Goals scored: 575 (3.44 per match)
- Attendance: 177,367 (1,062 per match)
- Top scorer(s): Bilal Mazhar (Panathinaikos); Mexx Meerdink (AZ); 9 goals each

The 2022–23 UEFA Youth League was the ninth season of the UEFA Youth League, a European youth club football competition organised by UEFA.

The title holders were Benfica, who defeated FC Salzburg 6–0 in the previous season's final. Benfica were eliminated in the group stage, while AZ won their first European title by beating Hajduk Split 5–0 in the final. They became the first Dutch club since Feyenoord in the 2001–02 UEFA Cup to win a European title.

== Teams ==
A total of 64 teams from 39 of the 55 UEFA member associations entered the tournament. They were split into two sections, each with 32 teams.

- UEFA Champions League Path: The youth teams of the 32 clubs which qualified for the 2022–23 UEFA Champions League group stage entered the UEFA Champions League Path. If there was a vacancy (youth teams not entering), it was filled by a team defined by UEFA.
- Domestic Champions Path: The youth domestic champions of the top 32 associations according to their 2022 UEFA country coefficients entered the Domestic Champions Path. If there was a vacancy (associations with no youth domestic competition, as well as youth domestic champions already included in the UEFA Champions League path), it was first filled by the title holders should they have not yet qualified, and then by the youth domestic champions of the next association in the UEFA ranking.

Apolonia, Ashdod, Borac Banja Luka, Coleraine, Eintracht Frankfurt, Hibernian, Jelgava, Nantes, Omonia, Pobeda, Pyunik, Racing Union, Rukh Lviv, Shamrock Rovers, Trenčín and Zagłębie Lubin made their tournament debuts. Armenia and Northern Ireland were represented for the first time.

Qualified teams for 2022–23 UEFA Youth League
| Rank | Association | Teams | |
| Rank | Association | UEFA Champions League Path | Domestic Champions Path |
|---|---|---|---|
| 1 | England | Manchester City (2021–22 U18 Premier League); Liverpool; Chelsea; Tottenham Hotspur | |
| 2 | Spain | Real Madrid; Barcelona (2021–22 División de Honor Juvenil U-19); Atlético Madrid; Sevilla | |
| 3 | Italy | Milan; Inter Milan (2021–22 Campionato Primavera 1); Napoli; Juventus | |
| 4 | Germany | Bayern Munich; Borussia Dortmund (2021–22 A-Junioren-Bundesliga); Bayer Leverkusen; RB Leipzig; Eintracht Frankfurt | |
| 5 | France | Paris Saint-Germain; Marseille | Nantes (2021–22 Championnat National U19) |
| 6 | Portugal | Porto; Sporting CP; Benfica (2021–22 Campeonato Nacional Juniores S19) | |
| 7 | Netherlands | Ajax | AZ (2021–22 Eredivisie U18) |
| 9 | Belgium | Club Brugge | Genk (2021–22 Belgian U18 League) |
| 10 | Austria | FC Salzburg (2021–22 Jugendliga U18) | |
| 11 | Scotland | Celtic; Rangers | Hibernian (2021–22 Scottish U18 League) |
| 12 | Ukraine | Shakhtar Donetsk | Rukh Lviv (2021–22 Ukrainian Premier League Youth) |
| 13 | Turkey | | Galatasaray (2021–22 U19 Elite) |
| 14 | Denmark | Copenhagen (2021–22 U19 Ligaen) | |
| 15 | Cyprus | | Omonia (2021–22 Cypriot U19 League) |
| 16 | Serbia | | Red Star Belgrade (2021–22 Serbian U19 League) |
| 17 | Czech Republic | Viktoria Plzeň | Slavia Prague (2021–22 Czech U19 League) |
| 18 | Croatia | Dinamo Zagreb | Hajduk Split (2021–22 1. HNL Juniori U19) |
| 19 | Switzerland | | Young Boys (2021–22 Swiss U18 League) |
| 20 | Greece | | Panathinaikos (2021–22 Superleague K19) |
| 21 | Israel | Maccabi Haifa | Ashdod (2021–22 Israeli U19 Noar Premier League) |
| 22 | Norway | | Molde (2021 Norwegian U19 Cup) |
| 23 | Sweden | | AIK (2021 P17 Allsvenskan) |
| 24 | Bulgaria | | Slavia Sofia (2021–22 U18 BFU Cup) |
| 25 | Romania | | Csíkszereda (2021–22 Liga Elitelor U19) |
| 26 | Azerbaijan | | Gabala (2021–22 Azerbaijani U19 League) |
| 27 | Kazakhstan | | Astana (2021 Kazakhstani U17 League) |
| 28 | Hungary | | MTK Budapest (2021–22 Hungarian U19 League) |
| 30 | Poland | | Zagłębie Lubin (2021–22 Polish U18 Central Junior League) |
| 31 | Slovenia | | Domžale (2021–22 Slovenian U19 League) |
| 32 | Slovakia | | Trenčín (2021–22 Slovak U19 League) |
| 34 | Lithuania | | Žalgiris (2021 Lithuanian Elite Youth League U19 Division) |
| 35 | Luxembourg | | Racing Union (2021–22 Luxembourg U19 Junior Championship) |
| 36 | Bosnia and Herzegovina | | Borac Banja Luka (2021–22 Bosnia and Herzegovina U19 Junior League) |
| 37 | Republic of Ireland | | Shamrock Rovers (2021 League of Ireland U19 Division) |
| 38 | North Macedonia | | Pobeda (2021–22 Macedonian U19 League) |
| 39 | Armenia | | Pyunik (2021 Armenian U18 League) |
| 40 | Latvia | | Jelgava (2021 Latvian U18 League) |
| 41 | Albania | | Apolonia (2021–22 Albanian U19 League) |
| 42 | Northern Ireland | | Coleraine (2021–22 Northern Ireland Academy League U18) |

Associations without any participating teams (no teams qualify for UEFA Champions League group stage, and either with no youth domestic competition or not ranked high enough for a vacancy)

| Rank | Association |
|---|---|
| 8 | Russia |
| 29 | Belarus |
| 33 | Liechtenstein |
| 43 | Georgia |
| 44 | Finland |
| 45 | Moldova |

| Rank | Association |
|---|---|
| 46 | Malta |
| 47 | Faroe Islands |
| 48 | Kosovo |
| 49 | Gibraltar |
| 50 | Montenegro |

| Rank | Association |
|---|---|
| 51 | Wales |
| 52 | Iceland |
| 53 | Estonia |
| 54 | Andorra |
| 55 | San Marino |

Notes

1. ^{TH} Title holders.
2. ^{YC} Teams playing in the UEFA Champions League Path which were also youth domestic champions.
3. ^{PO} Teams playing in the UEFA Champions League Path after their senior team qualified for the Champions League group stage via play-offs.
4. ^{V-RUS} Team playing in the Domestic Champions Path through the vacancy of Russia (excluded from UEFA competitions).
5. ^{V-BLR} Team playing in the Domestic Champions Path through the vacancy of Belarus.
6. ^{V-YC} Teams playing in the Domestic Champions Path through the vacancies of teams which qualified for the Champions League group stage automatically.
7. ^{V-PO} Teams playing in the Domestic Champions Path through the vacancies of teams which qualified for the Champions League group stage via play-offs.
8. Russia (RUS): On 28 February 2022, Russian football clubs and national teams were suspended from FIFA and UEFA competitions due to the 2022 Russian invasion of Ukraine. On 2 May 2022, UEFA confirmed that Russian clubs would be excluded from the 2022–23 UEFA competitions.
9. Ukraine (UKR): The 2021–22 Ukrainian Premier League and the 2021–22 Ukrainian U19 League were abandoned due to the 2022 Russian invasion of Ukraine. The top teams of the two leagues at the time of the abandonment (Shakhtar Donetsk and Rukh Lviv respectively) were selected to play in the 2022–23 UEFA Youth League by the Ukrainian Association of Football.
10. Kazakhstan (KAZ): The 2021 Kazakhstan Youth Cup were cancelled due to the COVID-19 pandemic in Kazakhstan. The top teams of the two leagues at the time of the abandonment. Astana, were selected to play in the 2022–23 UEFA Youth League by the Kazakhstan Football Federation.

== Round and draw dates ==
The schedule of the competition was as follows (all draws were held at the UEFA headquarters in Nyon, Switzerland, unless stated otherwise).

- For the UEFA Champions League Path group stage, in principle the teams played their matches on Tuesdays and Wednesdays of the matchdays as scheduled for UEFA Champions League, and on the same day as the corresponding senior teams; however, matches could also be played on other dates, including Mondays and Thursdays.
- For the Domestic Champions Path first and second rounds, in principle matches were played on Wednesdays (first round on matchdays 2 and 3, second round on matchdays 4 and 5, as scheduled for UEFA Champions League); however, matches could also be played on other dates, including Mondays, Tuesdays and Thursdays.

Schedule for 2022–23 UEFA Youth League
| Phase | Round | Draw date | First leg | Second leg |
|---|---|---|---|---|
| UEFA Champions League Path; Group stage | Matchday 1 | 25 August 2022 | 6–7 September 2022 | |
| UEFA Champions League Path; Group stage | Matchday 2 | 25 August 2022 | 13–14 September 2022 | |
| UEFA Champions League Path; Group stage | Matchday 3 | 25 August 2022 | 4–5 October 2022 | |
| UEFA Champions League Path; Group stage | Matchday 4 | 25 August 2022 | 11–12 October 2022 | |
| UEFA Champions League Path; Group stage | Matchday 5 | 25 August 2022 | 25–26 October 2022 | |
| UEFA Champions League Path; Group stage | Matchday 6 | 25 August 2022 | 1–2 November 2022 | |
| Domestic Champions Path | First round | 31 August 2022 | 14 September 2022 | 5 October 2022 |
| Domestic Champions Path | Second round | 31 August 2022 | 26 October 2022 | 2 November 2022 |
| Knockout phase | Knockout round play-offs | 8 November 2022 | 7–8 February 2023 | |
| Knockout phase | Round of 16 | 13 February 2023 | 28 February 2023 & 1 March | |
| Knockout phase | Quarter-finals | 13 February 2023 | 14–15 March 2023 | |
| Knockout phase | Semi-finals | 13 February 2023 | 21 April 2023 at Stade de Genève, Geneva | |
| Knockout phase | Final | 13 February 2023 | 24 April 2023 at Stade de Genève, Geneva | |

== UEFA Champions League Path ==
For the UEFA Champions League Path, the 32 teams were drawn into eight groups of four. There was no separate draw held, with the group compositions identical to the draw for the 2022–23 UEFA Champions League group stage, which was held on 25 August 2022, 18:00 CEST (19:00 TRT), in Istanbul, Turkey.

In each group, teams played against each other home-and-away in a round-robin format. The group winners advanced to the round of 16, while the eight runners-up advanced to the play-offs, where they would be joined by the eight second round winners from the Domestic Champions Path.

=== Group A ===
| Pos | Team | Pld | W | D | L | GF | GA | GD | Pts | Qualification | LIV | AJX | RAN | NAP |
|---|---|---|---|---|---|---|---|---|---|---|---|---|---|---|
| 1 | (The Football Association) Liverpool | 6 | 5 | 0 | 1 | 20 | 8 | +12 | 15 | Advance to round of 16 | — | 4–0 | 4–1 | 5–0 |
| 2 | (Royal Dutch Football Association) Ajax | 6 | 4 | 1 | 1 | 17 | 10 | +7 | 13 | Advance to play-offs | 3–1 | — | 2–1 | 5–1 |
| 3 | (Scottish Football Association) Rangers | 6 | 2 | 0 | 4 | 13 | 20 | −7 | 6 | | 3–4 | 2–6 | — | 3–2 |
| 4 | (Italian Football Federation) Napoli | 6 | 0 | 1 | 5 | 7 | 19 | −12 | 1 | | 1–2 | 1–1 | 2–3 | — |

Source: UEFA

=== Group B ===
| Pos | Team | Pld | W | D | L | GF | GA | GD | Pts | Qualification | ATM | POR | BRU | LEV |
|---|---|---|---|---|---|---|---|---|---|---|---|---|---|---|
| 1 | (Royal Spanish Football Federation) Atlético Madrid | 6 | 5 | 0 | 1 | 14 | 4 | +10 | 15 | Advance to round of 16 | — | 1–0 | 1–2 | 4–0 |
| 2 | (Portuguese Football Federation) Porto | 6 | 4 | 0 | 2 | 11 | 7 | +4 | 12 | Advance to play-offs | 1–2 | — | 2–1 | 3–1 |
| 3 | (Royal Belgian Football Association) Club Brugge | 6 | 3 | 0 | 3 | 10 | 9 | +1 | 9 | | 1–3 | 1–2 | — | 4–1 |
| 4 | (German Football Association) Bayer Leverkusen | 6 | 0 | 0 | 6 | 3 | 18 | −15 | 0 | | 0–3 | 1–3 | 0–1 | — |

Source: UEFA

=== Group C ===
| Pos | Team | Pld | W | D | L | GF | GA | GD | Pts | Qualification | BAR | INT | BAY | PLZ |
|---|---|---|---|---|---|---|---|---|---|---|---|---|---|---|
| 1 | (Royal Spanish Football Federation) Barcelona | 6 | 4 | 2 | 0 | 18 | 7 | +11 | 14 | Advance to round of 16 | — | 2–0 | 3–2 | 3–0 |
| 2 | (Italian Football Federation) Inter Milan | 6 | 2 | 1 | 3 | 10 | 14 | −4 | 7 | Advance to play-offs | 1–6 | — | 2–2 | 4–2 |
| 3 | (German Football Association) Bayern Munich | 6 | 1 | 3 | 2 | 13 | 13 | 0 | 6 | | 3–3 | 2–0 | — | 1–2 |
| 4 | (Football Association of the Czech Republic) Viktoria Plzeň | 6 | 1 | 2 | 3 | 8 | 15 | −7 | 5 | | 1–1 | 0–3 | 3–3 | — |

Source: UEFA

=== Group D ===
| Pos | Team | Pld | W | D | L | GF | GA | GD | Pts | Qualification | SPO | FRA | TOT | MAR |
|---|---|---|---|---|---|---|---|---|---|---|---|---|---|---|
| 1 | (Portuguese Football Federation) Sporting CP | 6 | 4 | 2 | 0 | 13 | 3 | +10 | 14 | Advance to round of 16 | — | 1–0 | 2–0 | 1–1 |
| 2 | (German Football Association) Eintracht Frankfurt | 6 | 3 | 2 | 1 | 9 | 6 | +3 | 11 | Advance to play-offs | 1–1 | — | 1–0 | 2–0 |
| 3 | (The Football Association) Tottenham Hotspur | 6 | 2 | 0 | 4 | 9 | 10 | −1 | 6 | | 1–2 | 2–3 | — | 3–0 |
| 4 | (French Football Federation) Marseille | 6 | 0 | 2 | 4 | 6 | 18 | −12 | 2 | | 0–6 | 2–2 | 2–3 | — |

Source: UEFA

=== Group E ===
| Pos | Team | Pld | W | D | L | GF | GA | GD | Pts | Qualification | MIL | SAL | DZG | CHE |
|---|---|---|---|---|---|---|---|---|---|---|---|---|---|---|
| 1 | (Italian Football Federation) Milan | 6 | 4 | 2 | 0 | 12 | 5 | +7 | 14 | Advance to round of 16 | — | 2–1 | 3–0 | 3–1 |
| 2 | (Austrian Football Association) FC Salzburg | 6 | 2 | 2 | 2 | 11 | 7 | +4 | 8 | Advance to play-offs | 1–1 | — | 2–0 | 5–1 |
| 3 | (Croatian Football Federation) Dinamo Zagreb | 6 | 2 | 0 | 4 | 7 | 14 | −7 | 6 | | 1–2 | 2–1 | — | 4–2 |
| 4 | (The Football Association) Chelsea | 6 | 1 | 2 | 3 | 10 | 14 | −4 | 5 | | 1–1 | 1–1 | 4–0 | — |

Source: UEFA

=== Group F ===
| Pos | Team | Pld | W | D | L | GF | GA | GD | Pts | Qualification | RMA | SHK | RBL | CEL |
|---|---|---|---|---|---|---|---|---|---|---|---|---|---|---|
| 1 | (Royal Spanish Football Federation) Real Madrid | 6 | 5 | 1 | 0 | 23 | 5 | +18 | 16 | Advance to round of 16 | — | 6–1 | 1–1 | 4–1 |
| 2 | (Ukrainian Association of Football) Shakhtar Donetsk | 6 | 3 | 1 | 2 | 6 | 10 | −4 | 10 | Advance to play-offs | 0–3 | — | 0–0 | 2–1 |
| 3 | (German Football Association) RB Leipzig | 6 | 1 | 2 | 3 | 6 | 8 | −2 | 5 | | 2–3 | 0–2 | — | 1–2 |
| 4 | (Scottish Football Association) Celtic | 6 | 1 | 0 | 5 | 4 | 16 | −12 | 3 | | 0–6 | 0–1 | 0–2 | — |

Source: UEFA

=== Group G ===
| Pos | Team | Pld | W | D | L | GF | GA | GD | Pts | Qualification | MCI | DOR | CPH | SEV |
|---|---|---|---|---|---|---|---|---|---|---|---|---|---|---|
| 1 | (The Football Association) Manchester City | 6 | 4 | 2 | 0 | 16 | 8 | +8 | 14 | Advance to round of 16 | — | 3–2 | 1–1 | 1–0 |
| 2 | (German Football Association) Borussia Dortmund | 6 | 2 | 2 | 2 | 9 | 9 | 0 | 8 | Advance to play-offs | 3–3 | — | 0–2 | 2–0 |
| 3 | (Danish Football Association) Copenhagen | 6 | 2 | 1 | 3 | 9 | 8 | +1 | 7 | | 1–3 | 0–1 | — | 4–1 |
| 4 | (Royal Spanish Football Federation) Sevilla | 6 | 1 | 1 | 4 | 5 | 14 | −9 | 4 | | 1–5 | 1–1 | 2–1 | — |

Source: UEFA

=== Group H ===
| Pos | Team | Pld | W | D | L | GF | GA | GD | Pts | Qualification | PAR | JUV | BEN | MHA |
|---|---|---|---|---|---|---|---|---|---|---|---|---|---|---|
| 1 | (French Football Federation) Paris Saint-Germain | 6 | 4 | 1 | 1 | 20 | 11 | +9 | 13 | Advance to round of 16 | — | 5–3 | 2–3 | 3–1 |
| 2 | (Italian Football Federation) Juventus | 6 | 3 | 2 | 1 | 17 | 14 | +3 | 11 | Advance to play-offs | 4–4 | — | 1–1 | 3–1 |
| 3 | (Portuguese Football Federation) Benfica | 6 | 2 | 1 | 3 | 12 | 10 | +2 | 7 | | 0–1 | 2–3 | — | 0–1 |
| 4 | (Israel Football Association) Maccabi Haifa | 6 | 1 | 0 | 5 | 6 | 20 | −14 | 3 | | 0–5 | 1–3 | 2–6 | — |

Source: UEFA

== Domestic Champions Path ==
For the Domestic Champions Path, the 32 teams were drawn into two rounds of two-legged home-and-away ties. The draw for both the first round and second round was held on 31 August 2022.

The eight second round winners advanced to the play-offs, where they were joined by the eight group runners-up from the UEFA Champions League Path (group stage).

=== First round ===
The first legs were played on 12–28 September and the second legs were played on 4–12 October 2022.

| Team 1 | Agg. | Team 2 | 1st leg | 2nd leg |
|---|---|---|---|---|
| Red Star Belgrade (Serbia) | 3–1 (Note: Order of legs reversed after original draw.) | (Cyprus) Omonia | 1–0 | 2–1 |
| Young Boys (Switzerland) | 5–2 | (Slovenia) Domžale | 3–0 | 2–2 |
| Genk (Belgium) | 5–4 | (Czech Republic) Slavia Prague | 1–2 | 4–2 |
| Nantes (France) | 5–0 | (Armenia) Pyunik | 2–0 | 3–0 |
| AZ (Netherlands) | 6–1 | (Republic of Ireland) Shamrock Rovers | 5–0 | 1–1 |
| AIK (Sweden) | 8–2 | (Luxembourg) Racing Union | 5–0 | 3–2 |
| Molde (Norway) | 2–2 (4–5 p) | (Scotland) Hibernian | 1–0 | 1–2 |
| Coleraine (Northern Ireland) | 5–4 | (North Macedonia) Pobeda | 3–2 | 2–2 |
| MTK Budapest (Hungary) | 4–0 | (Latvia) Jelgava | 3–0 | 1–0 |
| Žalgiris (Lithuania) | 2–5 | (Slovakia) Trenčín | 2–1 | 0–4 |
| Hajduk Split (Croatia) | 5–1 | (Azerbaijan) Gabala | 3–0 | 2–1 |
| Rukh Lviv (Ukraine) | 1–0 | (Poland) Zagłębie Lubin | 1–0 | 0–0 |
| Ashdod (Israel) | 5–0 | (Bosnia and Herzegovina) Borac Banja Luka | 2–0 | 3–0 |
| Panathinaikos (Greece) | 10–2 | (Bulgaria) Slavia Sofia | 8–0 | 2–2 |
| Astana (Kazakhstan) | 2–4 | (Albania) Apolonia | 1–1 | 1–3 |
| Csíkszereda (Romania) | 1–5 | (Turkey) Galatasaray | 1–1 | 0–4 |

=== Second round ===
| Team 1 | Agg. | Team 2 | 1st leg | 2nd leg |
|---|---|---|---|---|
| AZ (Netherlands) | 3–3 (4–3 p) | (Serbia) Red Star Belgrade | 2–2 | 1–1 |
| Hibernian (Scotland) | 3–1 | (France) Nantes | 1–0 | 2–1 |
| Young Boys (Switzerland) | 3–3 (9–8 p) | (Sweden) AIK | 0–3 | 3–0 |
| Coleraine (Northern Ireland) | 1–10 (Note: Order of legs reversed after original draw.) | (Belgium) Genk | 0–4 | 1–6 |
| Panathinaikos (Greece) | 6–3 | (Slovakia) Trenčín | 2–0 | 4–3 |
| Apolonia (Albania) | 1–6 | (Croatia) Hajduk Split | 0–3 | 1–3 |
| Galatasaray (Turkey) | 2–6 | (Ukraine) Rukh Lviv | 1–3 | 1–3 |
| Ashdod (Israel) | 1–2 | (Hungary) MTK Budapest | 0–2 | 1–0 |

== Knockout phase ==
=== Bracket ===
Knockout round play-offs
(Hungary) MTK Budapest | 0
(Netherlands) Ajax | 1
(Greece) Panathinaikos | 0
(Portugal) Porto | 1
(Netherlands) AZ | 5
(Germany) Eintracht Frankfurt | 0
(Switzerland) Young Boys | 2
(Austria) Red Bull Salzburg | 3
(Scotland) Hibernian | 1
(Germany) Borussia Dortmund | 2
(Croatia) Hajduk Split | 1
(Ukraine) Shakhtar Donetsk | 0
(Ukraine) Rukh Lviv (p) | 1 (4)
(Italy) Inter Milan | 1 (3)
(Belgium) Genk (p) | 0 (4)
(Italy) Juventus | 0 (3)

Round of 16
(Portugal) Sporting CP | 5
(Netherlands) Ajax | 1
(England) Liverpool (p) | 1 (6)
(Portugal) Porto | 1 (5)
(Spain) Barcelona | 0
(Netherlands) AZ | 3
(Spain) Real Madrid | 3
(Austria) Red Bull Salzburg | 1
(Germany) Borussia Dortmund (p) | 1 (5)
(France) Paris Saint-Germain | 1 (4)
(Croatia) Hajduk Split | 2
(England) Manchester City | 1
(Italy) Milan | 1
(Ukraine) Rukh Lviv | 0
(Spain) Atlético Madrid | 4
(Belgium) Genk | 1

Quarter-finals
(Portugal) Sporting CP | 1
(England) Liverpool | 0
(Netherlands) AZ | 4
(Spain) Real Madrid | 0
(Germany) Borussia Dortmund | 1 (8)
(Croatia) Hajduk Split (p) | 1 (9)
(Italy) Milan | 2
(Spain) Atlético Madrid | 0

Semi-finals
21 April – Geneva
(Portugal) Sporting CP | 2 (3)
(Netherlands) AZ (p) | 2 (4)
21 April – Geneva
(Croatia) Hajduk Split | 3
(Italy) Milan | 1

Final
24 April – Geneva
(Netherlands) AZ | 5
(Croatia) Hajduk Split | 0

=== Knockout round play-offs ===
The eight second round winners from the Domestic Champions Path were drawn against the eight group runners-up from the UEFA Champions League Path, with the teams from the Domestic Champions Path hosting the match. Teams from the same association could not be drawn against each other.

The draw was conducted on 8 November 2022 at the UEFA headquarters in Nyon. The knockout round play-offs were played over one leg on 7 and 8 February 2023.

| Home team | Score | Away team |
|---|---|---|
| Young Boys (Switzerland) | 2–3 | (Austria) Red Bull Salzburg |
| AZ (Netherlands) | 5–0 | (Germany) Eintracht Frankfurt |
| Rukh Lviv (Ukraine) | 1–1 (4–3 p) | (Italy) Inter Milan |
| Hajduk Split (Croatia) | 1–0 | (Ukraine) Shakhtar Donetsk |
| MTK Budapest (Hungary) | 0–1 | (Netherlands) Ajax |
| Hibernian (Scotland) | 1–2 | (Germany) Borussia Dortmund |
| Panathinaikos (Greece) | 0–1 | (Portugal) Porto |
| Genk (Belgium) | 0–0 (4–3 p) | (Italy) Juventus |

=== Round of 16 ===
The draw was conducted on 13 February 2023 at 13:00 CET in the UEFA headquarters in Nyon. The round of 16 was played over one leg on 28 February and 1 March 2023.

| Home team | Score | Away team |
|---|---|---|
| Milan (Italy) | 1–0 | (Ukraine) Rukh Lviv |
| Barcelona (Spain) | 0–3 | (Netherlands) AZ |
| Liverpool (England) | 1–1 (6–5 p) | (Portugal) Porto |
| Atlético Madrid (Spain) | 4–1 | (Belgium) Genk |
| Borussia Dortmund (Germany) | 1–1 (5–4 p) | (France) Paris Saint-Germain |
| Hajduk Split (Croatia) | 2–1 | (England) Manchester City |
| Sporting CP (Portugal) | 5–1 | (Netherlands) Ajax |
| Real Madrid (Spain) | 3–1 | (Austria) Red Bull Salzburg |

=== Quarter-finals ===
The draw was conducted on 13 February 2023 at 13:00 CET in the UEFA headquarters in Nyon. The quarter-finals were played over one leg on 14 and 15 March 2023.

| Home team | Score | Away team |
|---|---|---|
| AZ (Netherlands) | 4–0 | (Spain) Real Madrid |
| Milan (Italy) | 2–0 | (Spain) Atlético Madrid |
| Sporting CP (Portugal) | 1–0 | (England) Liverpool |
| Borussia Dortmund (Germany) | 1–1 (8–9 p) | (Croatia) Hajduk Split |

=== Semi-finals ===
The draw was conducted on 13 February 2023 at 13:00 CET in the UEFA headquarters in Nyon. The semi-finals were played over one leg on 21 April 2023. All four teams were qualified to the semi-finals for the first time ever, ensuring a fourth different champions in a row.

| Team 1 | Score | Team 2 |
|---|---|---|
| Sporting CP (Portugal) | 2–2 (3–4 p) | (Netherlands) AZ |
| Hajduk Split (Croatia) | 3–1 | (Italy) Milan |

=== Final ===
The final was played on 24 April 2023 at Stade de Genève, Geneva.

24 April 2023
18:00

| AZ (Netherlands) | 5–0 | (Croatia) Hajduk Split |
|---|---|---|
| Addai 45' (pen.); Poku 70', 76'; Meerdink 79', 87' | Report |

Stade de Genève, Geneva
Attendance: 9,390
Referee: Willy Delajod (France)

== Top goalscorers ==
| Rank | Player | Team | Goals |
|---|---|---|---|
| 1 | (Egypt) Bilal Mazhar | (Greece) Panathinaikos | 9 |
| 1 | (Netherlands) Mexx Meerdink | (Netherlands) AZ | 9 |
| 3 | (France) Ilyes Housni | (France) Paris Saint-Germain | 8 |
| 3 | (Spain) Adrián Niño | (Spain) Atlético Madrid | 8 |
| 3 | (Netherlands) Ernest Poku | (Netherlands) AZ | 8 |
| 6 | (Spain) Víctor Barberà | (Spain) Barcelona | 7 |
| 6 | (England) Oakley Cannonier | (England) Liverpool | 7 |
| 8 | (Spain) Ismaël Gharbi | (France) Paris Saint-Germain | 6 |
| 8 | (Ivory Coast) Karim Konaté | (Austria) FC Salzburg | 6 |
| 8 | (Portugal) Rodrigo Ribeiro | (Portugal) Sporting CP | 6 |
