= 2022–23 in English football =

Football in England
- Season: 2022–23

Men's football
- Premier League: Manchester City
- Championship: Burnley
- League One: Plymouth Argyle
- League Two: Leyton Orient
- National League: Wrexham
- FA Cup: Manchester City
- Community Shield: Liverpool
- EFL Cup: Manchester United
- EFL Trophy: Bolton Wanderers

Women's football
- Women's Super League: Chelsea
- Women's Championship: Bristol City
- FA Women's National League: Watford
- Women's FA Cup: Chelsea
- FA Women's League Cup: Arsenal

The 2022–23 season was the 143rd competitive association football season in England.

The season began in July 2022 due to the 2022 FIFA World Cup taking place from 20 November to 18 December 2022, the first time that an entire football season commenced a month earlier than normal since the 1945–46 season.

== National teams ==
=== England national football team ===
==== Results and fixtures ====
===== UEFA Nations League =====
====== Group 3 ======
Pos	Team	Pld	W	D	L	GF	GA	GD	Pts	Qualification or relegation	(Italy)	(Hungary)	(Germany)	(England)
1	Italy	6	3	2	1	8	7	+1	11	Qualification for Nations League Finals	—	2–1	1–1	1–0
2	Hungary	6	3	1	2	8	5	+3	10		0–2	—	1–1	1–0
3	Germany	6	1	4	1	11	9	+2	7		5–2	0–1	—	1–1
4	England (R)	6	0	3	3	4	10	−6	3	Relegation to League B	0–0	0–4	3–3	—

Source: UEFA
(R) Relegated

23 September 2022	Italy	1–0	England	Milan
19:45	Raspadori 68'	Report		Stadium: San Siro; Attendance: 50,640; Referee: Jesús Gil Manzano (Spain)

26 September 2022	England	3–3	Germany	London
19:45	Shaw 71'; Mount 75'; Kane 83' (pen.)	Report	Gündoğan 52' (pen.); Havertz 67', 87'	Stadium: Wembley Stadium; Attendance: 78,949; Referee: Danny Makkelie (Netherlands)

===== FIFA World Cup =====
====== Group B ======
Pos	Team	Pld	W	D	L	GF	GA	GD	Pts	Qualification
1	England	3	2	1	0	9	2	+7	7	Advance to knockout stage
2	United States	3	1	2	0	2	1	+1	5	Advance to knockout stage
3	Iran	3	1	0	2	4	7	−3	3	
4	Wales	3	0	1	2	1	6	−5	1	

Source: FIFA
Rules for classification: Group stage tiebreakers

21 November 2022	England	6–2	Iran	Al Rayyan, Qatar
16:00 AST (UTC+3)	Bellingham 35'; Saka 43', 62'; Sterling 45+1'; Rashford 71'; Grealish 89'	Report	Taremi 65', 90+13' (pen.)	Stadium: Khalifa International Stadium; Attendance: 45,334; Referee: Raphael Claus (Brazil)

25 November 2022	England	0–0	United States	Al Khor, Qatar
22:00 AST (UTC+3)		Report		Stadium: Al Bayt Stadium; Attendance: 68,463; Referee: Jesús Valenzuela (Venezuela)

29 November 2022	Wales	0–3	England	Al Rayyan, Qatar
22:00 AST (UTC+3)		Report	Rashford 50', 68'; Foden 51'	Stadium: Ahmad bin Ali Stadium; Attendance: 44,297; Referee: Slavko Vinčić (Slovenia)

====== Knockout stage ======
4 December 2022 R16	England	3–0	Senegal	Al Khor, Qatar
	Henderson 38'; Kane 45+3'; Saka 57'	Report		Stadium: Al Bayt Stadium; Attendance: 65,985; Referee: Iván Barton (El Salvador)

10 December 2022 QF	England	1–2	France	Al Khor, Qatar
22:00 AST (UTC+3)	Kane 54' (pen.)	Report	Tchouaméni 17'; Giroud 78'	Stadium: Al Bayt Stadium; Attendance: 68,895; Referee: Wilton Sampaio (Brazil)

===== UEFA Euro 2024 qualifying =====
====== Group C ======
Pos	Team	Pld	W	D	L	GF	GA	GD	Pts	Qualification	(England)	(Italy)	(Ukraine)	(North Macedonia)	(Malta)
1	England	8	6	2	0	22	4	+18	20	Qualify for final tournament	—	3–1	2–0	7–0	2–0
2	Italy	8	4	2	2	16	9	+7	14 (Note: Head-to-head points: Italy 4, Ukraine 1.)	Qualify for final tournament	1–2	—	2–1	5–2	4–0
3	Ukraine	8	4	2	2	11	8	+3	14	Advance to play-offs via Nations League	1–1	0–0	—	2–0	1–0
4	North Macedonia	8	2	2	4	10	20	−10	8		1–1	1–1	2–3	—	2–1
5	Malta	8	0	0	8	2	20	−18	0		0–4	0–2	1–3	0–2	—

Source: UEFA
Rules for classification: Qualification tiebreakers
Notes:

23 March 2023 1	Italy	1–2	England	Naples
20:45	Retegui 56'	Report	Rice 13'; Kane 44' (pen.)	Stadium: Stadio Diego Armando Maradona; Attendance: 44,536; Referee: Srđan Jovanović (Serbia)

26 March 2023 2	England	2–0	Ukraine	London
18:00 (17:00 UTC+1)	Kane 37'; Saka 40'	Report		Stadium: Wembley Stadium; Attendance: 83,947; Referee: Serdar Gözübüyük (Netherlands)

16 June 2023 3	Malta	0–4	England	Ta' Qali
20:45		Report	Apap 8' (o.g.); Alexander-Arnold 28'; Kane 31' (pen.); Wilson 83' (pen.)	Stadium: National Stadium; Attendance: 16,277; Referee: Igor Pajac (Croatia)

19 June 2023 4	England	7–0	North Macedonia	Manchester
20:45 (19:45 UTC+1)	Kane 29', 73' (pen.); Saka 38', 47', 51'; Rashford 45'; Phillips 64'	Report		Stadium: Old Trafford; Attendance: 70,708; Referee: István Kovács (Romania)

=== England women's national football team ===
==== Results and fixtures ====
===== Friendlies =====
7 October 2022	England	2–1	United States	London, England
	Hemp 10'; Stanway 33' (pen.)		Smith 28'	Stadium: Wembley Stadium; Attendance: 76,893; Referee: Riem Hussein (Germany)

11 October 2022	England	0–0	Czech Republic	Brighton and Hove, England
20:00				Stadium: Falmer Stadium; Attendance: 21,222; Referee: Alexandra Collin (France)

11 November 2022	England	4–0	Japan	Murcia, Spain
TBC	Daly 38'; Kelly 53'; Toone 77'; Park 90+1'	Report		Stadium: Pinatar Arena; Attendance: 3,000; Referee: Zuzana Valentová (Slovakia)

15 November 2022	England	1–1	Norway	Murcia, Spain
TBC	Daly 33'	Report	Maanum 80'	Stadium: Pinatar Arena; Referee: Zuzana Valentová (Slovakia)

11 April 2023	England	0–2	Australia	Brentford, England
19:45			Kerr 32'; Grant 67'	Stadium: Brentford Community Stadium; Attendance: 14,489; Referee: Natalie Simon (United States)

===== UEFA Women's Euro =====
====== Group A ======
Pos	Team	Pld	W	D	L	GF	GA	GD	Pts	Qualification
1	England (H)	3	3	0	0	14	0	+14	9	Advance to knockout stage
2	Austria	3	2	0	1	3	1	+2	6	Advance to knockout stage
3	Norway	3	1	0	2	4	10	−6	3	
4	Northern Ireland	3	0	0	3	1	11	−10	0	

Source: UEFA
Rules for classification: Group stage tiebreakers
(H) Hosts

6 July 2022	England	1–0	Austria	Manchester, England
	Mead 16'	Report		Stadium: Old Trafford; Attendance: 68,871; Referee: Marta Huerta de Aza (Spain)

11 July 2022	England	8–0	Norway	Brighton and Hove, England
	Stanway 12' (pen.); Hemp 15'; White 29', 41'; Mead 34', 38', 81'; Russo 66'	Report		Stadium: Brighton Community Stadium; Attendance: 28,847; Referee: Riem Hussein (Germany)

15 July 2022	Northern Ireland	0–5	England	Southampton, England
		Report	Kirby 40'; Mead 44'; Russo 48', 53'; Burrows 76' (o.g.)	Stadium: St Mary's Stadium; Attendance: 30,785; Referee: Esther Staubli (Switzerland)

====== Knockout stage ======
20 July 2022 QF	England	2–1 (a.e.t.)	Spain	Brighton and Hove, England
	Toone 84'; Stanway 96'	Report	González 54'	Stadium: Falmer Stadium; Attendance: 28,994; Referee: Stéphanie Frappart (France)

26 July 2022 SF	England	4–0	Sweden	Sheffield, England
20:00	Mead 34'; Bronze 48'; Russo 68'; Kirby 77'	Report		Stadium: Bramall Lane; Attendance: 28,624; Referee: Esther Staubli (Switzerland)

Final

31 July 2022
17:00

England	2–1 (a.e.t.)	Germany
Toone 62'; Kelly 110'	Report	Magull 79'

Wembley Stadium, London
Attendance: 87,192
Referee: Kateryna Monzul (Ukraine)

===== 2023 FIFA Women's World Cup qualification =====
====== Group D ======
Pos	Team	Pld	W	D	L	GF	GA	GD	Pts	Qualification	(England)	(Austria)	(Northern Ireland)	(Luxembourg)	(North Macedonia)	(Latvia)
1	England	10	10	0	0	80	0	+80	30	2023 FIFA Women's World Cup	—	1–0	4–0	10–0	8–0	20–0
2	Austria	10	7	1	2	50	7	+43	22	Play-offs	0–2	—	3–1	5–0	10–0	8–0
3	Northern Ireland	10	6	1	3	36	16	+20	19		0–5	2–2	—	4–0	9–0	4–0
4	Luxembourg	10	3	0	7	9	45	−36	9		0–10	0–8	1–2	—	2–1	3–2
5	North Macedonia	10	2	0	8	10	62	−52	6		0–10	0–6	0–11	2–3	—	3–2
6	Latvia	10	1	0	9	8	63	−55	3		0–10	1–8	1–3	1–0	1–4	—

Source: UEFA
Rules for classification: Tiebreakers

3 September 2022	Austria	0–2	England	Wiener Neustadt, Austria
		Report	Russo 7'; Parris 69'	Stadium: Stadion Wiener Neustadt; Attendance: 2,600; Referee: Iuliana Demetrescu (Romania)

6 September 2022 2023 World Cup qualifying	England	10–0	Luxembourg	Stoke-on-Trent, England
19:30	Stanway 11' (pen.), 26'; Russo 17'; Daly 38'; Mead 39'; England 47', 90+2'; Parris 59'; Toone 73' (pen.); Hemp 90'	Report		Stadium: Bet365 Stadium; Attendance: 24,174; Referee: Simona Ghisletta (Switzerland)

===== 2023 Arnold Clark Cup =====
Pos	Team	Pld	W	D	L	GF	GA	GD	Pts
1	England (H, C)	3	3	0	0	12	2	+10	9
2	Belgium	3	2	0	1	5	8	−3	6
3	Italy	3	1	0	2	4	5	−1	3
4	South Korea	3	0	0	3	2	8	−6	0

Source: BBC
Rules for classification: 1) points; 2) goal difference; 3) goals scored; 4) head-to-head result; 5) fair play ranking.
(C) Champions; (H) Hosts

16 February 2023	England	4–0	South Korea	Milton Keynes, England
	Stanway 40' (pen.); Kelly 46'; Russo 50'; James 78'			Stadium: Stadium MK; Attendance: 21,013; Referee: Andreza de Siqueira (Brazil)

19 February 2023	England	2–1	Italy	Coventry, England
	Daly 32', 71'	Report	Cantore 62'	Stadium: Coventry Building Society Arena; Attendance: 32,128; Referee: Ivana Projkovska (North Macedonia)

22 February 2023	England	6–1	Belgium	Bristol, England
	Kelly 12', 50'; Williamson 42', 90+3'; Biesmans 78' (o.g.); Bronze 89'	Report	Dhont 90+1'	Stadium: Ashton Gate Stadium; Attendance: 26,169; Referee: Jelena Cvetković (Serbia)

===== 2023 Women's Finalissima =====
6 April 2023
19:45 BST

England	1–1	Brazil
Toone 23'	Report	Andressa 90+3'
Penalties
Stanway (penalty scored); Toone (penalty missed); Daly (penalty scored); Greenwood (penalty scored); Kelly (penalty scored)	4–2	(penalty scored) Adriana; (penalty missed) Tamires; (penalty missed) Rafaelle; (penalty scored) Kerolin

Wembley Stadium, London
Attendance: 83,132
Referee: Stéphanie Frappart (France)

== UEFA competitions ==
=== UEFA Champions League ===
==== Group stage ====
===== Group A =====
Pos	Team	Pld	W	D	L	GF	GA	GD	Pts	Qualification	NAP	LIV	AJX	RAN
1	(Italy) Napoli	6	5	0	1	20	6	+14	15 (Note: Tied on head-to-head points. Head-to-head goal difference: Napoli +1, Liverpool −1.)	Advance to knockout phase	—	4–1	4–2	3–0
2	(England) Liverpool	6	5	0	1	17	6	+11	15	Advance to knockout phase	2–0	—	2–1	2–0
3	(Netherlands) Ajax	6	2	0	4	11	16	−5	6	Transfer to Europa League	1–6	0–3	—	4–0
4	(Scotland) Rangers	6	0	0	6	2	22	−20	0		0–3	1–7	1–3	—

Source: UEFA

===== Group D =====
Pos	Team	Pld	W	D	L	GF	GA	GD	Pts	Qualification	TOT	FRA	SPO	MAR
1	(England) Tottenham Hotspur	6	3	2	1	8	6	+2	11	Advance to knockout phase	—	3–2	1–1	2–0
2	(Germany) Eintracht Frankfurt	6	3	1	2	7	8	−1	10	Advance to knockout phase	0–0	—	0–3	2–1
3	(Portugal) Sporting CP	6	2	1	3	8	9	−1	7	Transfer to Europa League	2–0	1–2	—	0–2
4	(France) Marseille	6	2	0	4	8	8	0	6		1–2	0–1	4–1	—

Source: UEFA

===== Group E =====
Pos	Team	Pld	W	D	L	GF	GA	GD	Pts	Qualification	CHE	MIL	SAL	DZG
1	(England) Chelsea	6	4	1	1	10	4	+6	13	Advance to knockout phase	—	3–0	1–1	2–1
2	(Italy) Milan	6	3	1	2	12	7	+5	10	Advance to knockout phase	0–2	—	4–0	3–1
3	(Austria) Red Bull Salzburg	6	1	3	2	5	9	−4	6	Transfer to Europa League	1–2	1–1	—	1–0
4	(Croatia) Dinamo Zagreb	6	1	1	4	4	11	−7	4		1–0	0–4	1–1	—

Source: UEFA

===== Group G =====
Pos	Team	Pld	W	D	L	GF	GA	GD	Pts	Qualification	MCI	DOR	SEV	CPH
1	(England) Manchester City	6	4	2	0	14	2	+12	14	Advance to knockout phase	—	2–1	3–1	5–0
2	(Germany) Borussia Dortmund	6	2	3	1	10	5	+5	9	Advance to knockout phase	0–0	—	1–1	3–0
3	(Spain) Sevilla	6	1	2	3	6	12	−6	5	Transfer to Europa League	0–4	1–4	—	3–0
4	(Denmark) Copenhagen	6	0	3	3	1	12	−11	3		0–0	1–1	0–0	—

Source: UEFA

==== Knockout phase ====
===== Round of 16 =====
Team 1	Agg.	Team 2	1st leg	2nd leg
RB Leipzig (Germany)	1–8	(England) Manchester City	1–1	0–7
Liverpool (England)	2–6	(Spain) Real Madrid	2–5	0–1
Milan (Italy)	1–0	(England) Tottenham Hotspur	1–0	0–0
Borussia Dortmund (Germany)	1–2	(England) Chelsea	1–0	0–2

===== Quarter-finals =====
Team 1	Agg.	Team 2	1st leg	2nd leg
Real Madrid (Spain)	4–0	(England) Chelsea	2–0	2–0
Manchester City (England)	4–1	(Germany) Bayern Munich	3–0	1–1

===== Semi-finals =====
Team 1	Agg.	Team 2	1st leg	2nd leg
Real Madrid (Spain)	1–5	(England) Manchester City	1–1	0–4

===== Final =====
10 June 2023
22:00 UTC+3

Manchester City (The Football Association)	1–0	(Italian Football Federation) Inter Milan
Rodri 68'	Report

Atatürk Olympic Stadium, Istanbul
Attendance: 71,412
Referee: Szymon Marciniak (Poland)

=== UEFA Europa League ===
==== Group stage ====
===== Group A =====
Pos	Team	Pld	W	D	L	GF	GA	GD	Pts	Qualification	ARS	PSV	BOD	ZUR
1	(England) Arsenal	6	5	0	1	8	3	+5	15	Advance to round of 16	—	1–0	3–0	1–0
2	(Netherlands) PSV Eindhoven	6	4	1	1	15	4	+11	13	Advance to knockout round play-offs	2–0	—	1–1	5–0
3	(Norway) Bodø/Glimt	6	1	1	4	5	10	−5	4	Transfer to Europa Conference League	0–1	1–2	—	2–1
4	(Switzerland) Zürich	6	1	0	5	5	16	−11	3		1–2	1–5	2–1	—

Source: UEFA

===== Group E =====
Pos	Team	Pld	W	D	L	GF	GA	GD	Pts	Qualification	RSO	MUN	SHE	OMO
1	(Spain) Real Sociedad	6	5	0	1	10	2	+8	15 (Note: Tied on head-to-head results. Overall goal difference is used as the tiebreaker.)	Advance to round of 16	—	0–1	3–0	2–1
2	(England) Manchester United	6	5	0	1	10	3	+7	15	Advance to knockout round play-offs	0–1	—	3–0	1–0
3	(Moldova) Sheriff Tiraspol	6	2	0	4	4	10	−6	6	Transfer to Europa Conference League	0–2	0–2	—	1–0
4	(Cyprus) Omonia	6	0	0	6	3	12	−9	0		0–2	2–3	0–3	—

Source: UEFA

==== Knockout stage ====
===== Knockout-round play-offs =====
Team 1	Agg.	Team 2	1st leg	2nd leg
Barcelona (Spain)	3–4	(England) Manchester United	2–2	1–2

===== Round of 16 =====
Team 1	Agg.	Team 2	1st leg	2nd leg
Sporting CP (Portugal)	3–3 (5–3 p)	(England) Arsenal	2–2	1–1 (a.e.t.)
Manchester United (England)	5–1	(Spain) Real Betis	4–1	1–0

===== Quarter-finals =====
Team 1	Agg.	Team 2	1st leg	2nd leg
Manchester United (England)	2–5	(Spain) Sevilla	2–2	0–3

=== UEFA Europa Conference League ===
==== Qualifying phase and play-off round ====
===== Play-off round =====
Team 1	Agg.	Team 2	1st leg	2nd leg
West Ham United (England)	6–1	(Denmark) Viborg	3–1	3–0

==== Group stage ====
===== Group B =====
Pos	Team	Pld	W	D	L	GF	GA	GD	Pts	Qualification	WHU	AND	SIL	FCSB
1	(England) West Ham United	6	6	0	0	13	4	+9	18	Advance to round of 16	—	2–1	1–0	3–1
2	(Belgium) Anderlecht	6	2	2	2	6	5	+1	8	Advance to knockout round play-offs	0–1	—	1–0	2–2
3	(Denmark) Silkeborg	6	2	0	4	12	7	+5	6		2–3	0–2	—	5–0
4	(Romania) FCSB	6	0	2	4	3	18	−15	2		0–3	0–0	0–5	—

Source: UEFA

==== Knockout stage ====
===== Round of 16 =====
Team 1	Agg.	Team 2	1st leg	2nd leg
AEK Larnaca (Cyprus)	0–6	(England) West Ham United	0–2	0–4

===== Quarter-finals =====
Team 1	Agg.	Team 2	1st leg	2nd leg
Gent (Belgium)	2–5	(England) West Ham United	1–1	1–4

===== Semi-finals =====
Team 1	Agg.	Team 2	1st leg	2nd leg
West Ham United (England)	3–1	(Netherlands) AZ	2–1	1–0

===== Final =====
7 June 2023
21:00 UTC+2

Fiorentina (Italian Football Federation)	1–2	(The Football Association) West Ham United
Bonaventura 67'	Report	Benrahma 62' (pen.); Bowen 90'

Fortuna Arena, Prague
Attendance: 17,363
Referee: Carlos del Cerro Grande (Spain)

=== UEFA Youth League ===
==== UEFA Champions League Path ====
===== Group stage =====
====== Group A ======
Pos	Team	Pld	W	D	L	GF	GA	GD	Pts	Qualification	LIV	AJX	RAN	NAP
1	(The Football Association) Liverpool	6	5	0	1	20	8	+12	15	Round of 16	—	4–0	4–1	5–0
2	(Royal Dutch Football Association) Ajax	6	4	1	1	17	10	+7	13	Play-offs	3–1	—	2–1	5–1
3	(Scottish Football Association) Rangers	6	2	0	4	13	20	−7	6		3–4	2–6	—	3–2
4	(Italian Football Federation) Napoli	6	0	1	5	7	19	−12	1		1–2	1–1	2–3	—

Source: UEFA

====== Group D ======
Pos	Team	Pld	W	D	L	GF	GA	GD	Pts	Qualification	SPO	FRA	TOT	MAR
1	(Portuguese Football Federation) Sporting CP	6	4	2	0	13	3	+10	14	Round of 16	—	1–0	2–0	1–1
2	(German Football Association) Eintracht Frankfurt	6	3	2	1	9	6	+3	11	Play-offs	1–1	—	1–0	2–0
3	(The Football Association) Tottenham Hotspur	6	2	0	4	9	10	−1	6		1–2	2–3	—	3–0
4	(French Football Federation) Marseille	6	0	2	4	6	18	−12	2		0–6	2–2	2–3	—

Source: UEFA

====== Group E ======
Pos	Team	Pld	W	D	L	GF	GA	GD	Pts	Qualification	MIL	SAL	DZG	CHE
1	(Italian Football Federation) Milan	6	4	2	0	12	5	+7	14	Round of 16	—	2–1	3–0	3–1
2	(Austrian Football Association) FC Salzburg	6	2	2	2	11	7	+4	8	Play-offs	1–1	—	2–0	5–1
3	(Croatian Football Federation) Dinamo Zagreb	6	2	0	4	7	14	−7	6		1–2	2–1	—	4–2
4	(The Football Association) Chelsea	6	1	2	3	10	14	−4	5		1–1	1–1	4–0	—

Source: UEFA

====== Group G ======
Pos	Team	Pld	W	D	L	GF	GA	GD	Pts	Qualification	MCI	DOR	CPH	SEV
1	(The Football Association) Manchester City	6	4	2	0	16	8	+8	14	Round of 16	—	3–2	1–1	1–0
2	(German Football Association) Borussia Dortmund	6	2	2	2	9	9	0	8	Play-offs	3–3	—	0–2	2–0
3	(Danish Football Association) Copenhagen	6	2	1	3	9	8	+1	7		1–3	0–1	—	4–1
4	(Royal Spanish Football Federation) Sevilla	6	1	1	4	5	14	−9	4		1–5	1–1	2–1	—

Source: UEFA

==== Knockout phase ====
===== Round of 16 =====
Team 1	Score	Team 2
Liverpool (England)	1–1 (6–5 p)	(Portugal) Porto
Hajduk Split (Croatia)	2–1	(England) Manchester City

===== Quarter-finals =====
Team 1	Score	Team 2
Sporting CP (Portugal)	1–0	(England) Liverpool

=== UEFA Women's Champions League ===
==== Qualifying rounds ====
===== Round 1 =====
====== Semi-finals ======
Team 1	Score	Team 2
Manchester City (England)	6–0	(Kazakhstan) Tomiris-Turan

====== Final ======
Team 1	Score	Team 2
Manchester City (England)	0–1	(Spain) Real Madrid

===== Round 2 =====
Team 1	Agg.	Team 2	1st leg	2nd leg
Arsenal (England)	3–2	(Netherlands) Ajax	2–2	1–0

==== Group stage ====
===== Group A =====
Pos	Team	Pld	W	D	L	GF	GA	GD	Pts	Qualification	CHE	PAR	MAD	VLL
1	(England) Chelsea	6	5	1	0	19	1	+18	16	Advance to Quarter-finals	—	3–0	2–0	8–0
2	(France) Paris Saint-Germain	6	3	1	2	11	5	+6	10	Advance to Quarter-finals	0–1	—	2–1	5–0
3	(Spain) Real Madrid	6	2	2	2	9	6	+3	8		1–1	0–0	—	5–1
4	(Albania) Vllaznia	6	0	0	6	1	28	−27	0		0–4	0–4	0–2	—

Source: UEFA

===== Group C =====
Pos	Team	Pld	W	D	L	GF	GA	GD	Pts	Qualification	ARS	LYO	JUV	ZÜR
1	(England) Arsenal	6	4	1	1	19	5	+14	13	Advance to Quarter-finals	—	0–1	1–0	3–1
2	(France) Lyon	6	3	2	1	10	6	+4	11	Advance to Quarter-finals	1–5	—	0–0	4–0
3	(Italy) Juventus	6	2	3	1	9	3	+6	9		1–1	1–1	—	5–0
4	(Switzerland) Zürich	6	0	0	6	2	26	−24	0		1–9	0–3	0–2	—

Source: UEFA

==== Knockout phase ====
===== Quarter-finals =====
Team 1	Agg.	Team 2	1st leg	2nd leg
Bayern Munich (Germany)	1–2	(England) Arsenal	1–0	0–2
Lyon (France)	2–2 (3–4 p)	(England) Chelsea	0–1	2–1 (a.e.t.)

===== Semi-finals =====
Team 1	Agg.	Team 2	1st leg	2nd leg
VfL Wolfsburg (Germany)	5–4	(England) Arsenal	2–2	3–2 (a.e.t.)
Chelsea (England)	1–2	(Spain) Barcelona	0–1	1–1

== Men's football ==
League Division	Promoted to league ▲	Relegated from league ▼
Premier League	Fulham ▲; Bournemouth ▲; Nottingham Forest ▲	Burnley ▼; Watford ▼; Norwich City ▼
Championship	Wigan Athletic ▲; Rotherham United ▲; Sunderland ▲	Peterborough United ▼; Derby County ▼; Barnsley ▼
League One	Forest Green Rovers ▲; Exeter City ▲; Bristol Rovers ▲; Port Vale ▲	Gillingham ▼; Doncaster Rovers ▼; AFC Wimbledon ▼; Crewe Alexandra ▼
League Two	Stockport County ▲; Grimsby Town ▲	Oldham Athletic ▼; Scunthorpe United ▼
National League	Maidstone United ▲; Gateshead ▲; York City ▲; Dorking Wanderers ▲	King's Lynn Town ▼; Dover Athletic ▼; Weymouth ▼

=== Premier League ===
Having looked like a short-end in the Premier League, a recovery in the closing months of the season saw Manchester City secure their third league title in a row. Manchester City also won the FA Cup and the Champions League, the latter of which included defeating the last winners of the tournament, Real Madrid, in the second-leg to match their city rivals' Treble while summer signing Erling Haaland breaking several goal-scoring records for the Premier League. A fantastic start to their campaign saw Arsenal challenge for the title and remain in contention up until the closing months, when a succession of dropped points resulted in the Gunners falling away; however, their second place finish proved their highest for seven years and they secured a return to the Champions League after a six-year absence.

Having been in contention for an unprecedented quadruple the previous year, Liverpool's overall season proved to be a disappointment, a sluggish start to the league campaign extinguishing the Reds' hopes of challenging for the title following the departure of key player Sadio Mané and a failure to sign a midfielder in both transfer windows; whilst they still enjoyed some impressive results, including a 7–0 home win over Manchester United, a failure to build on these results - despite an equally strong end to the season - ultimately cost the Merseyside club a top-four finish for the first time since 2016. Brighton and Hove Albion enjoyed inarguably their greatest top-flight season, the Seagulls even shrugging off the loss of highly-regarded manager Graham Potter early in the campaign to finish with a record points total under Roberto De Zerbi and their highest goal record for years – successfully finishing in sixth place and qualifying for the Europa League and European football for the first time in their history. Aston Villa took seventh place, qualifying for the Europa Conference League; this achievement looked unlikely in late October, with the Midlands side looking likely to battle relegation once again following a poor start, but the decision to appoint former Sevilla and Arsenal manager Unai Emery proved an inspired choice as the Villans surged away from the drop zone and took advantage of the teams around them dropping points to ensure a return to European football for the first time in thirteen years. Having made a fairly strong start to their season, Tottenham Hotspur's campaign rapidly fell away from mid-October onwards; resulting in growing fan anger towards owner Daniel Levy boiling over, feelings not helped by the dismissal of manager Antonio Conte in March in the aftermath of a furious press conference rant by the Italian over player performances and a lack of backing by Levy – with the London club then going over to appoint two different interim managers to cap a disappointing end to the season, failing to qualify for any European competitions for the first time since 2009 and conceding more than relegation-battling Everton, their only real positive being striker Harry Kane once again smashing the 30-goal mark.

For only the fourth time in the Premier League era, all three promoted teams avoided relegation; Fulham performed easily the best, the Whites comfortably secured a second successive top-flight season for the first time in a decade, even breaking their own club records for most wins and goals scored in a top-flight season, only missing out on European football in the closing weeks. Bournemouth endured a rough return to the top-flight, with manager Scott Parker getting sacked and replaced by former player Gary O'Neill just four games into the campaign with the club facing another relegation battle, days following a 9–0 loss to Liverpool – but having looked likely to endure the drop once again, the Cherries went on to scrap to safety in the closing weeks. Having looked set for an immediate return to the Championship, a successful run of form in the closing weeks helped Nottingham Forest defy the odds and haul themselves over the line in their first top-flight season since 1999; also proving to be key to the East Midlands club staying up were some big home results across the campaign - despite winning only one away game all season - and the continued support given to manager Steve Cooper by owner Evangelos Marinakis, even in the face of poor runs of form.

Chelsea endured their worst league season for 29 years; having made a reasonable start, the bizarre sacking of manager Thomas Tuchel following a defeat to Dinamo Zagreb in the Champions League in favour of Graham Potter after only a few games saw the London club rapidly fall down the table, with Potter then getting the sack in early April – despite a strong run in the Champions League and some big money signings – and the appointment of former manager Frank Lampard seeing the Blues finish 12th, only mathematically securing their place early in May to cap an underwhelming first season under the ownership of Todd Boehly and missing out on European football for the first time in seven years. West Ham United endured a rough league campaign, only scraping to safety in the closing weeks after two successive seasons finishing in the top seven; however, it was in the Europa Conference League that the Hammers excelled, winning all but one of their games on their way to winning the tournament, securing their first European trophy since the Cup Winners’ Cup triumph in 1965, and in turn, ensuring a return to the Europa League for next season. Crystal Palace and Wolverhampton Wanderers also looked down and out with the Eagles being the only side without a win in 2023 and the Black Country club being bottom of the table at Christmas with both clubs going on to change managers and comfortably secure safety in the closing weeks of the campaign.

At the bottom of the table, the relegation battle proved to be especially tight, with a number of teams in the mix up until the closing weeks – but after eleven years in the top-flight and a succession of lower finishes in recent seasons, Southampton's fortunes finally ran out and they endured relegation to the Championship, the Saints making it through three managers across the campaign and winning just two home games all season. Leeds United were also undone by disastrous form from late August onwards, getting through four managers, ultimately rendering the Marcelo Bielsa era a false dawn and leaving their future prospects looking almost as bleak as they had after their previous relegation from the top-flight in 2004 as they once again faced a player exodus and uncertainty over the club's ownership. Leicester City, who coincidentally had been relegated alongside Leeds United 19 years previously, filled the final relegation spot, the Foxes completing a spectacular fall from grace only two years after winning the FA Cup and seven years after winning the Premier League, bringing an end to nine storied years in the top flight, the East Midlands side's relegation coming as a result of terrible form after the World Cup break whilst changing managers in April. Much like with their previous season, Everton were dragged into the relegation battle very early in the campaign, changed managers at the turn of the year, and only barely secured their Premier League position on the final day amid growing anger off-field from the fans over the running of the club.

Pos	Team	Pld	W	D	L	GF	GA	GD	Pts	Qualification or relegation
1	Manchester City (C)	38	28	5	5	94	33	+61	89	Qualification to Champions League group stage
2	Arsenal	38	26	6	6	88	43	+45	84	Qualification to Champions League group stage
3	Manchester United	38	23	6	9	58	43	+15	75	Qualification to Champions League group stage
4	Newcastle United	38	19	14	5	68	33	+35	71	Qualification to Champions League group stage
5	Liverpool	38	19	10	9	75	47	+28	67	Qualification to Europa League group stage (Note: Since the winners of the 2022–23 FA Cup, Manchester City, qualified for the Champions League, the spot given to the FA Cup winners (Europa League group stage) was passed to the sixth-placed team.)
6	Brighton & Hove Albion	38	18	8	12	72	53	+19	62	Qualification to Europa League group stage
7	Aston Villa	38	18	7	13	51	46	+5	61	Qualification to Europa Conference League play-off round (Note: Since the winners of the 2022–23 EFL Cup, Manchester United, qualified for the Champions League, the spot given to the League Cup winners (Europa Conference League play-off round) was passed to the seventh-placed team.)
8	Tottenham Hotspur	38	18	6	14	70	63	+7	60	
9	Brentford	38	15	14	9	58	46	+12	59	
10	Fulham	38	15	7	16	55	53	+2	52	
11	Crystal Palace	38	11	12	15	40	49	−9	45	
12	Chelsea	38	11	11	16	38	47	−9	44	
13	Wolverhampton Wanderers	38	11	8	19	31	58	−27	41	
14	West Ham United	38	11	7	20	42	55	−13	40	Qualification to Europa League group stage (Note: West Ham United qualified for the Europa League group stage by winning the 2022–23 UEFA Europa Conference League.)
15	Bournemouth	38	11	6	21	37	71	−34	39	
16	Nottingham Forest	38	9	11	18	38	68	−30	38	
17	Everton	38	8	12	18	34	57	−23	36	
18	Leicester City (R)	38	9	7	22	51	68	−17	34	Relegation to EFL Championship
19	Leeds United (R)	38	7	10	21	48	78	−30	31	Relegation to EFL Championship
20	Southampton (R)	38	6	7	25	36	73	−37	25	Relegation to EFL Championship

Source: Premier League
Rules for classification: 1) Points; 2) Goal difference; 3) Goals scored; 4) If the champions, relegated teams or qualified teams for UEFA competitions cannot be determined by rules 1 to 3, rules 4.1 to 4.3 are applied – 4.1) Points gained in head-to-head record between such teams; 4.2) Away goals scored in head-to-head record between such teams; 4.3) Play-offs
(C) Champions; (R) Relegated

=== Championship ===
In spite of seeing a number of key players depart in pre-season and making a sluggish start back to life in the Championship, the surprise decision to appoint Manchester City legend Vincent Kompany as their new manager proved an excellent one for Burnley as the Clarets comfortably secured an immediate return to the Premier League, earning promotion on Good Friday, winning the title with victory at local rivals Blackburn Rovers and finishing with over 100 points – with perhaps the only disappointment being their form after promotion to miss out on breaking the record points total for the second tier. Sheffield United took second place, making amends for their narrow play-off semi-final miss the previous season to earn their second promotion to the top flight in four years, the Blades' resurgence under manager Paul Heckingbottom continuing following their disastrous relegation in 2021. The play-off final ended up being between Luton Town and Coventry City, a remarkable achievement for the clubs considering both had played together in League Two in 2018 – with Luton overcoming the loss of manager Nathan Jones for the second time in four seasons to end their 31-year exile from the top-flight (ironically having been relegated in the season before the Premier League was established) and complete the Hatters' rise back up the football pyramid, having been in the fifth tier in 2014, and earn head coach Rob Edwards his second managerial promotion in two years.

Sunderland's first season back in the second tier proved to be a turbulent ride; despite the Black Cats losing manager Alex Neil not even a month into the season, suffering an extensive injury crisis for practically their entire campaign and enduring a number of poor runs of form, they managed to keep themselves in the promotion mix, squeezing into sixth place on the final day and then only narrowly losing in the play-off semi-finals. Having narrowly missed out on promotion the previous season, the unexpected departure of manager Carlos Corberán in pre-season destabilised Huddersfield Town's season and left them battling relegation - with only the appointment of veteran manager Neil Warnock in February providing the Terriers with enough spark to fight their way out of the drop zone and to safety in their penultimate game. After six successive years of moving between the second and third tiers, Rotherham United finally avoided relegation from the Championship and ensured a second successive season in the division, the Millers even overcoming the departure of influential manager Paul Warne early in the campaign and gaining wins at crucial points to secure their place. Queens Park Rangers spent the first half of the season looking to make a surprise promotion challenge, only for their form to completely implode following the departure of manager Michael Beale to Rangers, ultimately only staying up by virtue of two victories in their last three matches.

Despite a battling rally in the closing weeks of the season, Wigan Athletic endured their fourth relegation to League One in eight years, yet again making it through three different managers – whilst also enduring a points deduction for failing to pay players on time. Blackpool finished just above them, the Seasiders never really recovering from the loss of influential manager Neil Critchley in pre-season as they also made it through three different managers across the campaign, dropping back into the third tier after two seasons. After years of narrow escapes from the drop, Reading's luck finally ran out and they endured relegation to the third tier for the first time since 2002 – the Royals also enduring their own points deduction that coincided with a poor run of form, pushing them from a reasonable mid-table finish into the bottom three with weeks to go; had it not been for the points deduction, then Cardiff City would have been relegated.

Pos	Team	Pld	W	D	L	GF	GA	GD	Pts	Promotion, qualification or relegation
1	Burnley (C, P)	46	29	14	3	87	35	+52	101	Promotion to Premier League
2	Sheffield United (P)	46	28	7	11	73	39	+34	91	Promotion to Premier League
3	Luton Town (O, P)	46	21	17	8	57	39	+18	80	Qualification for Championship play-offs
4	Middlesbrough	46	22	9	15	84	56	+28	75	Qualification for Championship play-offs
5	Coventry City	46	18	16	12	58	46	+12	70	Qualification for Championship play-offs
6	Sunderland	46	18	15	13	68	55	+13	69	Qualification for Championship play-offs
7	Blackburn Rovers	46	20	9	17	52	54	−2	69	
8	Millwall	46	19	11	16	57	50	+7	68	
9	West Bromwich Albion	46	18	12	16	59	53	+6	66	
10	Swansea City	46	18	12	16	68	64	+4	66	
11	Watford	46	16	15	15	56	53	+3	63	
12	Preston North End	46	17	12	17	45	59	−14	63	
13	Norwich City	46	17	11	18	57	54	+3	62	
14	Bristol City	46	15	14	17	55	56	−1	59	
15	Hull City	46	14	16	16	51	61	−10	58	
16	Stoke City	46	14	11	21	55	54	+1	53	
17	Birmingham City	46	14	11	21	47	58	−11	53	
18	Huddersfield Town	46	14	11	21	47	62	−15	53	
19	Rotherham United	46	11	17	18	49	60	−11	50	
20	Queens Park Rangers	46	13	11	22	44	71	−27	50	
21	Cardiff City	46	13	10	23	41	58	−17	49	
22	Reading (R)	46	13	11	22	46	68	−22	44 (Note: Reading were deducted 6 points for breaching an EFL business plan.)	Relegation to League One
23	Blackpool (R)	46	11	11	24	48	72	−24	44	Relegation to League One
24	Wigan Athletic (R)	46	10	15	21	38	65	−27	42 (Note: In March 2023, Wigan Athletic were deducted 3 points for failing to pay players and staff on time.)	Relegation to League One

Source: EFL Official Website
Rules for classification: 1) Points; 2) Goal difference; 3) Number of goals scored; 4) Head-to-head results; 5) Wins; 6) Away goals; 7) Penalty points (sec 9.5); 8) 12-point sending off offences
(C) Champions; (O) Play-off winners; (P) Promoted; (R) Relegated

=== League One ===
Having looked all but decided in the early months of 2023, the battle for the League One title ended up going to the final two weeks of the season, with each of Ipswich Town, Plymouth Argyle and Sheffield Wednesday battling it out to finish in the top two – a battle that was ultimately won with Plymouth finishing as champions and Ipswich finishing second; one season after seeing influential manager Ryan Lowe depart and then narrowly missing out on a top-six finish, the Pilgrims continued their climb back up the Football League and returned to the Championship after a 13-year absence, even managing to break the 100-point mark in the process, whilst the Tractor Boys scored over 100 goals to finish with comfortably the highest goal-scoring record in the division (as well as breaking club records for wins and points in a season) to end a four-season exile from the second tier, achieve their first promotion since 2000 and earn manager Kieran McKenna, in his first full season as manager, his first promotion. Wednesday made amends in the playoffs and were promoted in the most dramatic of circumstances, overturning a 4–0 deficit in their semi final against Peterborough United to win on penalties and then winning the final in the last minute of extra time, denying Yorkshire rivals Barnsley in the process.

Forest Green Rovers' maiden campaign in League One proved an absolute disaster, finishing with the worst points total in the division for thirteen years and enduring their first relegation in 68 years in a torrid season that saw them finish with the fewest goals scored and the most conceded. Despite some spirited results across their season, five losses from their final seven games – coupled with some heavy earlier losses – ultimately consigned Accrington Stanley to their first relegation in 24 years, the Lancashire club falling back into League Two after five years. The battle to avoid the last two spots went down to the final day, with Cambridge United – in spite of a collapse in form from mid-January onwards – ultimately scraping across the line to condemn Morecambe and Milton Keynes Dons to the drop after two and four years in the division respectively; Morecambe had looked all but relegated earlier in the season, only for the Shrimpers to save some face and go down fighting with a late run of wins, whilst the Dons were made to pay for a run of six draws in their final eight games that saw them slip from apparently certain safety. For Morecambe, however, this was their first relegation in their 103-year history.

Pos	Team	Pld	W	D	L	GF	GA	GD	Pts	Promotion, qualification or relegation
1	Plymouth Argyle (C, P)	46	31	8	7	82	47	+35	101	Promotion to EFL Championship
2	Ipswich Town (P)	46	28	14	4	101	35	+66	98	Promotion to EFL Championship
3	Sheffield Wednesday (O, P)	46	28	12	6	81	37	+44	96	Qualification for League One play-offs
4	Barnsley	46	26	8	12	80	47	+33	86	Qualification for League One play-offs
5	Bolton Wanderers	46	23	12	11	62	36	+26	81	Qualification for League One play-offs
6	Peterborough United	46	24	5	17	75	54	+21	77	Qualification for League One play-offs
7	Derby County	46	21	13	12	67	46	+21	76	
8	Portsmouth	46	17	19	10	61	50	+11	70	
9	Wycombe Wanderers	46	20	9	17	59	51	+8	69	
10	Charlton Athletic	46	16	14	16	70	66	+4	62	
11	Lincoln City	46	14	20	12	47	47	0	62	
12	Shrewsbury Town	46	17	8	21	52	61	−9	59	
13	Fleetwood Town	46	14	16	16	53	51	+2	58	
14	Exeter City	46	15	11	20	64	68	−4	56	
15	Burton Albion	46	15	11	20	57	79	−22	56	
16	Cheltenham Town	46	14	12	20	45	61	−16	54	
17	Bristol Rovers	46	14	11	21	58	73	−15	53	
18	Port Vale	46	13	10	23	48	71	−23	49	
19	Oxford United	46	11	14	21	49	56	−7	47	
20	Cambridge United	46	13	7	26	41	68	−27	46	
21	Milton Keynes Dons (R)	46	11	12	23	44	66	−22	45	Relegation to EFL League Two
22	Morecambe (R)	46	10	14	22	47	78	−31	44	Relegation to EFL League Two
23	Accrington Stanley (R)	46	11	11	24	40	77	−37	44	Relegation to EFL League Two
24	Forest Green Rovers (R)	46	6	9	31	31	89	−58	27	Relegation to EFL League Two

Source: EFL Official Website
Rules for classification: 1) Points; 2) Goal difference; 3) Number of goals scored; 4) Head-to-head results; 5) Wins; 6) Away goals; 7) Penalty points (sec 9.5); 8) 12-point sending off offences
(C) Champions; (O) Play-off winners; (P) Promoted; (R) Relegated

=== League Two ===
Despite a few stuttering moments in the second half of the season, Leyton Orient emerged victorious at the top of the table and secured their first promotion to League One for eight years, going up as champions in manager Richie Wellens' first full season in charge. The battle for the remaining automatic spots proved to be much tighter, with five teams in the mix at the start of April - but having spent the previous decade consistently struggling to avoid relegation to the National League (and only avoiding relegation in 2020 thanks to the demise of both Bury and Macclesfield Town), Stevenage enjoyed a major turnaround in Steve Evans' first full season in charge and were promoted as runners-up. Northampton Town made up for losing automatic promotion on the last day of the previous season by winning promotion on the last day, securing their third promotion from League Two in seven years. Taking the final spot through the play-offs were Carlisle United, who scraped past Stockport County on penalties to secure their first promotion since 2006 and cap a wonderful turnaround under manager Paul Simpson, having been battling the drop out of the Football League only the previous year.

In spite of narrowly falling short of a second successive promotion, Stockport County's first season back in the Football League proved an excellent one, the Hatters even keeping the automatic promotion race open until the very last day. A very poor first half of the season saw Gillingham's 73-year status in the Football League under serious threat, with only fourteen points secured and just seven league goals scored by the halfway point – but the signing of forward Tom Nichols in the January transfer window proved a turning point for the Gills' season, the Kent club rocketing away from the relegation battle and comfortably into mid-table, albeit still finishing with the lowest goal tally in the campaign. Despite once again being contenders for promotion and being in the promotion race early in the season, Doncaster Rovers ended up recording their lowest finish since returning to the Football League in 2003, a consequence of indifferent form across their campaign and the second-highest number of losses for the League Two season.

The battle to avoid the drop proved unpredictable up until the final weeks of the season, with several teams looking likely to drop out of the Football League then going on to find form – but in the end, Rochdale suffered their second relegation in three years and dropped into the National League, with even a late improvement in form not being enough to keep their 102-year membership of the Football League from coming to an end. Hartlepool United were relegated after two years, ultimately being made to pay the price for dismal early-season form that saw them win only twice in their first twenty games, the north-east club's struggles following the departure of promotion-winning manager Dave Challinor the previous season continuing. Crawley Town narrowly survived at Hartlepool's expense, with a 2–0 win for Crawley over Hartlepool in their third-to-last game ultimately proving to be decisive.

Pos	Team	Pld	W	D	L	GF	GA	GD	Pts	Promotion, qualification or relegation
1	Leyton Orient (C, P)	46	26	13	7	61	34	+27	91	Promotion to EFL League One
2	Stevenage (P)	46	24	13	9	61	39	+22	85	Promotion to EFL League One
3	Northampton Town (P)	46	23	14	9	62	42	+20	83	Promotion to EFL League One
4	Stockport County	46	22	13	11	65	37	+28	79	Qualification for League Two play-offs
5	Carlisle United (O, P)	46	20	16	10	66	43	+23	76	Qualification for League Two play-offs
6	Bradford City	46	20	16	10	61	43	+18	76	Qualification for League Two play-offs
7	Salford City	46	22	9	15	72	54	+18	75	Qualification for League Two play-offs
8	Mansfield Town	46	21	12	13	72	55	+17	75	
9	Barrow	46	18	8	20	47	53	−6	62	
10	Swindon Town	46	16	13	17	61	55	+6	61	
11	Grimsby Town	46	16	13	17	49	56	−7	61	
12	Tranmere Rovers	46	15	13	18	45	48	−3	58	
13	Crewe Alexandra	46	14	16	16	48	60	−12	58	
14	Sutton United	46	15	13	18	46	58	−12	58	
15	Newport County	46	14	15	17	53	56	−3	57	
16	Walsall	46	12	19	15	46	49	−3	55	
17	Gillingham	46	14	13	19	36	49	−13	55	
18	Doncaster Rovers	46	16	7	23	46	65	−19	55	
19	Harrogate Town	46	12	16	18	59	68	−9	52	
20	Colchester United	46	12	13	21	44	51	−7	49	
21	AFC Wimbledon	46	11	15	20	48	60	−12	48	
22	Crawley Town	46	11	13	22	48	71	−23	46	
23	Hartlepool United (R)	46	9	16	21	52	78	−26	43	Relegation to National League
24	Rochdale (R)	46	9	11	26	46	70	−24	38	Relegation to National League

Source: EFL Official Website
Rules for classification: 1) Points; 2) Goal difference; 3) Number of goals scored; 4) Head-to-head results; 5) Wins; 6) Away goals; 7) Penalty points (sec 9.5); 8) 12-point sending off offences
(C) Champions; (O) Play-off winners; (P) Promoted; (R) Relegated

=== National League ===
In one of the most competitive title races in the fifth tier's history, with new goals and record points totals being set for both first and second place, Wrexham ended their second full season of ownership under Hollywood actors Ryan Reynolds and Rob McElhenney, successfully holding off Notts County to end their fifteen-year exile from the Football League and going up as champions – dropping just two points at home all season and giving manager Phil Parkinson his fourth promotion (as well as the club's first promotion in twenty years). Notts County would ultimately make amends for missing out on automatic promotion by winning the play-off final against Chesterfield on penalties, capping their own remarkable season that saw the Magpies regain their status as the oldest league football club in the world (having lost it with relegation in 2019), earning manager Luke Williams his first promotion, and saw summer signing Macaulay Langstaff break the goal-scoring record for the fifth tier.

Oldham Athletic's first season outside of the Football League saw the Latics initially face a second successive relegation, before the appointment of former Everton player David Unsworth as manager saw an upturn in results, enough to secure a top-half finish – with perhaps only their indifferent form earlier in the season preventing a potential play-off finish. In their first ever season at this level, Dorking Wanderers enjoyed a roller coaster ride of a campaign; despite conceding over 90 goals and spending a lot of the early months of 2023 hovering around the drop zone, the Surrey side rallied with ten games to go and went on a successful run of form to ensure their place in the fifth tier for another season, even managing to outscore over half the teams in the table.

At the bottom of the table, Maidstone United's return to the fifth tier proved to be a complete disaster, with just five wins all season and over 100 goals conceded, the club securing just four points after the January dismissal of manager Hakan Hayrettin; making even bigger headlines were Scunthorpe United, who suffered the embarrassment of a second successive relegation and fell into the National League North, just twelve years after having played in the Championship – the Iron becoming only the second team to endure back-to-back relegations from the Football League to the sixth tier. A decade after having won promotion to the Championship, Yeovil Town's fall down the football pyramid continued as they fell into the sixth tier for the first time since 1997, the Glovers being let down by the worst goal-scoring record in the division and a failure to turn any of their many draws into wins. A late winning run from Torquay United saw the battle to avoid the last relegation spot go down to the final day, but ultimately the Gulls could not better the results of their rivals and fell back into the National League South, just two years after narrowly missing out on promotion back to the fourth tier.

Pos	Team	Pld	W	D	L	GF	GA	GD	Pts	Promotion, qualification or relegation
1	Wrexham (C, P)	46	34	9	3	116	43	+73	111	Promotion to EFL League Two
2	Notts County (O, P)	46	32	11	3	117	42	+75	107	Qualification for the National League play-off semi-finals
3	Chesterfield	46	25	9	12	81	52	+29	84	Qualification for the National League play-off semi-finals
4	Woking	46	24	10	12	71	48	+23	82	Qualification for the National League play-off quarter-finals
5	Barnet	46	21	11	14	75	67	+8	74	Qualification for the National League play-off quarter-finals
6	Boreham Wood	46	19	15	12	52	40	+12	72	Qualification for the National League play-off quarter-finals
7	Bromley	46	18	17	11	68	53	+15	71	Qualification for the National League play-off quarter-finals
8	Southend United	46	20	9	17	57	45	+12	69	
9	Eastleigh	46	19	10	17	56	57	−1	67	
10	Dagenham & Redbridge	46	18	9	19	61	72	−11	63	
11	FC Halifax Town	46	16	13	17	49	48	+1	61	
12	Oldham Athletic	46	16	13	17	63	64	−1	61	
13	Wealdstone	46	16	12	18	57	72	−15	60	
14	Gateshead	46	15	15	16	67	62	+5	59 (Note: Gateshead were deducted one point for playing an ineligible player.)	
15	Solihull Moors	46	15	13	18	62	66	−4	58	
16	Dorking Wanderers	46	16	9	21	67	91	−24	57	
17	Altrincham	46	14	14	18	68	82	−14	56	
18	Aldershot Town	46	14	11	21	64	76	−12	53	
19	York City	46	13	12	21	55	63	−8	51	
20	Maidenhead United	46	13	11	22	47	66	−19	50	
21	Torquay United (R)	46	12	12	22	58	80	−22	48	Relegation to National League South
22	Yeovil Town (R)	46	7	19	20	35	60	−25	40	Relegation to National League South
23	Scunthorpe United (R)	46	8	10	28	49	87	−38	34	Relegation to National League North
24	Maidstone United (R)	46	5	10	31	45	104	−59	25	Relegation to National League South

Rules for classification: 1) Points; 2) Goal difference; 3) Number of goals scored; 4) Number of matches won; 5) Head-to-head results
(C) Champions; (O) Play-off winners; (P) Promoted; (R) Relegated

==== North ====
AFC Fylde won the league and returned to the fifth tier for the first time since 2020, King's Lynn Town finished in second, two points behind. Kidderminster Harriers won 2–0 against Brackley Town in the play-off final to seal promotion to the fifth tier. Newly promoted Scarborough Athletic and Buxton impressed, finishing eighth and eleventh respectively. Southport and Farsley Celtic survived relegation on the final day despite defeat to relegated Leamington and Spennymoor Town who missed out on the play-offs due to goal difference. Blyth Spartans survived relegation with a 5–0 win over Hereford on the final day.

Pos	Team	Pld	W	D	L	GF	GA	GD	Pts	Promotion, qualification or relegation
1	AFC Fylde (C, P)	46	29	8	9	80	44	+36	95	Promotion to National League
2	King's Lynn Town	46	27	12	7	84	43	+41	93	Qualification for the National League North play-off semi-finals
3	Chester	46	22	18	6	72	41	+31	84	Qualification for the National League North play-off semi-finals
4	Brackley Town	46	18	15	13	57	47	+10	69	Qualification for the National League North play-off quarter-finals
5	Alfreton Town	46	17	18	11	54	44	+10	69	Qualification for the National League North play-off quarter-finals
6	Kidderminster Harriers (O, P)	46	19	12	15	49	42	+7	69	Qualification for the National League North play-off quarter-finals
7	Gloucester City	46	19	11	16	75	68	+7	68	Qualification for the National League North play-off quarter-finals
8	Scarborough Athletic	46	18	14	14	74	69	+5	68	
9	Spennymoor Town	46	18	14	14	68	67	+1	68	
10	Darlington	46	18	13	15	72	64	+8	67	
11	Buxton	46	18	13	15	55	54	+1	67	
12	Chorley	46	17	15	14	62	50	+12	66	
13	Curzon Ashton	46	18	11	17	58	55	+3	65	
14	Peterborough Sports	46	15	12	19	50	55	−5	57	
15	Boston United	46	15	11	20	68	66	+2	56	
16	Hereford	46	15	10	21	47	56	−9	55	
17	Banbury United	46	13	15	18	55	62	−7	54	
18	Southport	46	13	11	22	50	62	−12	50	
19	Blyth Spartans	46	12	14	20	49	62	−13	50	
20	Farsley Celtic	46	12	14	20	51	75	−24	50	
21	Kettering Town (R)	46	11	16	19	41	63	−22	49	Relegation to the Southern League Premier Division Central
22	Leamington (R)	46	10	18	18	41	60	−19	48	Relegation to the Southern League Premier Division Central
23	Bradford (Park Avenue) (R)	46	11	13	22	43	65	−22	46	Relegation to the Northern Premier League Premier Division
24	AFC Telford United (R)	46	6	14	26	35	76	−41	32	Relegation to the Southern League Premier Division Central

Source: National League official site
Rules for classification: 1) Points; 2) Goal difference; 3) Number of goals scored; 4) Number of matches won; 5) Head-to-head results
(C) Champions; (O) Play-off winners; (P) Promoted; (R) Relegated

==== South ====
Ebbsfleet United were champions, breaking the 100-point barrier. Oxford City won promotion to the fifth tier for the first time in their history after beating St Albans City 4–0 in the final. Weymouth looked like they were heading for a second successive relegation but survived on goal difference, as did Dover Athletic.

Pos	Team	Pld	W	D	L	GF	GA	GD	Pts	Promotion, qualification or relegation
1	Ebbsfleet United (C, P)	46	32	7	7	110	47	+63	103	Promotion to National League
2	Dartford	46	25	8	13	82	50	+32	83	Qualification for the National League South play-off semi-finals
3	Oxford City (O, P)	46	21	15	10	83	56	+27	78	Qualification for the National League South play-off semi-finals
4	Worthing	46	22	12	12	92	72	+20	78	Qualification for the National League South play-off quarter-finals
5	Chelmsford City	46	23	9	14	67	49	+18	78	Qualification for the National League South play-off quarter-finals
6	St Albans City	46	22	9	15	72	51	+21	75	Qualification for the National League South play-off quarter-finals
7	Braintree Town	46	20	14	12	66	55	+11	74	Qualification for the National League South play-off quarter-finals
8	Eastbourne Borough	46	22	5	19	74	66	+8	71	
9	Tonbridge Angels	46	20	10	16	68	69	−1	70	
10	Havant & Waterlooville	46	19	12	15	80	70	+10	69	
11	Bath City	46	19	10	17	64	57	+7	67	
12	Farnborough	46	19	9	18	59	52	+7	66	
13	Chippenham Town	46	15	17	14	57	66	−9	62	
14	Taunton Town	46	17	10	19	50	55	−5	61	
15	Hemel Hempstead Town	46	15	15	16	49	57	−8	60	
16	Welling United	46	15	14	17	57	63	−6	58 (Note: Welling United were deducted one point for playing an ineligible player.)	
17	Hampton & Richmond Borough	46	15	9	22	59	71	−12	54	
18	Slough Town	46	13	12	21	58	78	−20	51	
19	Weymouth	46	14	6	26	59	78	−19	48	
20	Dover Athletic	46	12	12	22	42	68	−26	48	
21	Dulwich Hamlet (R)	46	13	9	24	61	89	−28	48	Relegation to the Isthmian League Premier Division
22	Concord Rangers (R)	46	12	8	26	45	85	−40	44	Relegation to the Isthmian League Premier Division
23	Cheshunt (R)	46	11	10	25	48	74	−26	43	Relegation to the Isthmian League Premier Division
24	Hungerford Town (R)	46	10	10	26	48	72	−24	40	Relegation to the Southern League Premier Division South

Source: National League official site
Rules for classification: 1) Points; 2) Goal difference; 3) Number of goals scored; 4) Number of matches won; 5) Head-to-head results
(C) Champions; (O) Play-off winners; (P) Promoted; (R) Relegated

=== League play-offs ===
==== Football League play-offs ====
===== EFL Championship =====
====== Final ======
27 May 2023
16:45 BST

Coventry City	1–1 (a.e.t.)	Luton Town
Hamer 66'	Report	Clark 23'
Penalties
Godden (penalty scored); Gyökeres (penalty scored); Sheaf (penalty scored); Eccles (penalty scored); Kelly (penalty scored); Dabo (penalty missed)	5–6	(penalty scored) Morris; (penalty scored) Taylor; (penalty scored) Nakamba; (penalty scored) Clark; (penalty scored) Berry; (penalty scored) Potts

Wembley Stadium, London
Attendance: 85,711
Referee: Michael Oliver

===== EFL League One =====
====== Final ======
29 May 2023
15:00 BST

Barnsley	0–1 (a.e.t.)	Sheffield Wednesday
		Windass 120+3'

Wembley Stadium, London
Attendance: 72,492
Referee: Tim Robinson

===== EFL League Two =====
====== Final ======
28 May 2023
13:30 BST

Stockport County	1–1 (a.e.t.)	Carlisle United
Mellish 34' (o.g.)	Report	Patrick 84'
Penalties
Lemonheigh-Evans (penalty scored); Rydel (penalty missed); Hippolyte (penalty scored); Stretton (penalty scored); Collar (penalty scored)	4–5	(penalty scored) Dennis; (penalty scored) Mellish; (penalty scored) Edmondson; (penalty scored) Moxon; (penalty scored) Charters

Wembley Stadium, London
Attendance: 34,004
Referee: Tom Nield

==== National League play-offs ====
===== National League =====
====== Final ======
13 May 2023
15:30 BST

Notts County	2–2 (a.e.t.)	Chesterfield
Bostock 87'; Rodrigues 108'	Report	Dallas 5' (pen.); Dobra 93'
Penalties
Langstaff (penalty scored); Rodrigues (penalty scored); Jones (penalty scored); Bostock (penalty missed); Scott (penalty scored)	4–3	(penalty scored) Banks; (penalty missed) Oldaker; (penalty scored) Maguire; (penalty missed) King; (penalty scored) Quigley

Wembley Stadium, London
Attendance: 38,138
Referee: Matthew Corlett

=== Cup competitions ===
==== FA Cup ====
===== Final =====
3 June 2023
15:00 BST

Manchester City	2–1	Manchester United
Gündoğan 1', 51'	Report	Fernandes 33' (pen.)

Wembley Stadium, London
Attendance: 83,179
Referee: Paul Tierney (Lancashire)

==== EFL Cup ====
===== Final =====
26 February 2023
16:30 GMT

Manchester United	2–0	Newcastle United
Casemiro 33'; Rashford 39'	Report

Wembley Stadium, London
Attendance: 87,306
Referee: David Coote (Nottinghamshire)

==== Community Shield ====
30 July 2022
17:00 BST

Liverpool	3–1	Manchester City
Alexander-Arnold 21'; Salah 83' (pen.); Núñez 90+4'	Report	Alvarez 70'

King Power Stadium, Leicester
Attendance: 28,545
Referee: Craig Pawson (Sheffield & Hallamshire)

==== EFL Trophy ====
===== Final =====
2 April 2023

Bolton Wanderers	4–0	Plymouth Argyle
Dempsey 4'; Charles 10'; Kachunga 49'; Jones 62'	Report

Wembley Stadium, London
Attendance: 79,389
Referee: Ben Toner

==== FA Trophy ====
===== Final =====
21 May 2023
16:15 BST

FC Halifax Town	1–0	Gateshead
Cooke 44'	Report

Wembley Stadium, London
Attendance: 27,374
Referee: Darren England

== Women's football ==
=== Women's Super League ===
Pos	Team	Pld	W	D	L	GF	GA	GD	Pts	Qualification or relegation
1	Chelsea (C)	22	19	1	2	66	15	+51	58	Qualification for the Champions League group stage (Note: England's UEFA association coefficient meant, as the 4th ranked association, the WSL champions qualified for the second round. However, as 2022–23 UEFA Women's Champions League winners Barcelona had already qualified for the group stage as 2022–23 Liga F champions, the title holders' berth to the group stage was redistributed to Chelsea.)
2	Manchester United	22	18	2	2	56	12	+44	56	Qualification for the Champions League second round
3	Arsenal	22	15	2	5	49	16	+33	47	Qualification for the Champions League first round
4	Manchester City	22	15	2	5	50	25	+25	47	
5	Aston Villa	22	11	4	7	47	37	+10	37	
6	Everton	22	9	3	10	29	36	−7	30	
7	Liverpool	22	6	5	11	24	39	−15	23	
8	West Ham United	22	6	3	13	23	44	−21	21	
9	Tottenham Hotspur	22	5	3	14	31	47	−16	18	
10	Leicester City	22	5	1	16	15	48	−33	16	
11	Brighton & Hove Albion	22	4	4	14	26	63	−37	16	
12	Reading (R)	22	3	2	17	23	57	−34	11	Relegation to the Championship

Source: Women's Super League
Rules for classification: 1) Points; 2) Goal difference; 3) Number of goals scored.
(C) Champions; (R) Relegated

=== Women's Championship ===
Pos	Team	Pld	W	D	L	GF	GA	GD	Pts	Qualification
1	Bristol City (C, P)	22	15	3	4	39	12	+27	48	Promotion to the WSL (Note: Dependent on obtaining a licence.)
2	Birmingham City	22	15	2	5	39	22	+17	47	
3	London City Lionesses	22	14	3	5	49	20	+29	45	
4	Charlton Athletic	22	11	5	6	34	27	+7	38	
5	Crystal Palace	22	11	1	10	28	34	−6	34	
6	Southampton	22	9	6	7	22	15	+7	33	
7	Durham	22	8	4	10	30	29	+1	28	
8	Sheffield United	22	8	3	11	32	25	+7	27	
9	Lewes	22	7	5	10	20	29	−9	26	
10	Blackburn Rovers	22	5	8	9	20	29	−9	23	
11	Sunderland	22	5	3	14	26	38	−12	18	
12	Coventry United (R)	22	2	1	19	16	75	−59	7	Relegation to the Southern Premier Division

Rules for classification: 1) Points; 2) Goal difference; 3) Number of goals scored
(C) Champions; (P) Promoted; (R) Relegated

=== Women's National League ===
==== Northern Premier Division ====
Pos	Team	Pld	W	D	L	GF	GA	GD	Pts	Promotion or relegation
1	Nottingham Forest (C)	22	17	3	2	81	18	+63	54	Qualification for the Championship play-off
2	Wolverhampton Wanderers	22	17	3	2	61	17	+44	54	
3	Burnley	22	16	4	2	66	28	+38	52	
4	Derby County	22	11	5	6	50	32	+18	38	
5	Brighouse Town	22	8	7	7	28	27	+1	31	
6	Huddersfield Town	22	7	5	10	36	43	−7	26	
7	AFC Fylde	22	7	5	10	24	54	−30	26	
8	West Bromwich Albion	22	7	4	11	28	46	−18	25	
9	Liverpool Feds	22	7	3	12	36	45	−9	24	
10	Stoke City	22	7	3	12	32	49	−17	24	
11	Boldmere St. Michaels (R)	22	5	1	16	27	61	−34	16	Relegation to the Division One Midlands
12	Loughborough Lightning (R)	22	0	3	19	10	59	−49	3	Relegation to the Division One Midlands

Source: The Football Association
Rules for classification: 1) Points; 2) Goal difference; 3) Number of goals scored
(C) Champions; (R) Relegated

==== Southern Premier Division ====
Pos	Team	Pld	W	D	L	GF	GA	GD	Pts	Promotion or relegation
1	Watford (C, O, P)	22	17	2	3	65	17	+48	53	Qualification for the Championship play-off
2	Ipswich Town	22	17	2	3	48	11	+37	53	
3	Oxford United	22	16	3	3	53	15	+38	51	
4	Portsmouth	22	15	2	5	44	20	+24	47	
5	Milton Keynes Dons	22	9	3	10	38	42	−4	30	
6	Billericay Town	22	8	4	10	37	41	−4	28	
7	Gillingham	22	8	4	10	23	29	−6	28	
8	Cheltenham Town	22	7	4	11	29	50	−21	25	
9	London Bees	22	7	2	13	22	41	−19	23	
10	Plymouth Argyle	22	6	1	15	23	45	−22	19	
11	Bridgwater United (R)	22	3	5	14	20	43	−23	14	Relegation to the Division One South West
12	Crawley Wasps (R)	22	1	4	17	13	61	−48	7	Relegation to the Division One South East

Source: The Football Association
Rules for classification: 1) Points; 2) Goal difference; 3) Number of goals scored
(C) Champions; (O) Play-off winners; (P) Promoted; (R) Relegated

==== Division One North ====
Pos	Team	Pld	W	D	L	GF	GA	GD	Pts	Promotion or relegation
1	Newcastle United (C, P)	22	18	2	2	65	18	+47	56	Promotion to the Northern Premier Division
2	Durham Cestria	22	18	2	2	55	12	+43	56	
3	Stockport County	22	11	4	7	39	23	+16	37	
4	Barnsley	22	11	4	7	37	27	+10	37	
5	Hull City	22	10	5	7	46	30	+16	35	
6	Leeds United	22	11	2	9	41	34	+7	35	
7	Norton & Stockton Ancients	22	8	6	8	26	33	−7	30	
8	Chorley	22	6	4	12	27	48	−21	22	
9	York City	22	6	3	13	32	46	−14	21	
10	Middlesbrough	22	6	3	13	23	46	−23	21	
11	Bradford City (R)	22	6	0	16	22	48	−26	18	Relegation from the National League
12	Merseyrail (R)	22	1	5	16	11	59	−48	8	Relegation from the National League

Source: The Football Association
Rules for classification: 1) Points; 2) Goal difference; 3) Number of goals scored
(C) Champions; (P) Promoted; (R) Relegated

==== Division One Midlands ====
Pos	Team	Pld	W	D	L	GF	GA	GD	Pts	Promotion or relegation
1	Stourbridge (C, P)	22	17	3	2	86	16	+70	54	Promotion to the Northern Premier Division
2	Doncaster Rovers Belles	22	13	3	6	45	22	+23	42	
3	Sporting Khalsa	22	12	3	7	62	33	+29	39	
4	Peterborough United	22	12	3	7	48	30	+18	39	
5	Northampton Town	22	11	3	8	45	26	+19	36	
6	Lincoln City	22	9	3	10	73	54	+19	30	
7	Solihull Moors	22	8	6	8	43	29	+14	30	
8	Sheffield	21	8	4	9	46	28	+18	28	
9	Leafield Athletic	22	8	4	10	45	47	−2	28	
10	Leek Town	22	7	6	9	38	49	−11	27	
11	Wem Town (R)	21	5	2	14	31	58	−27	17	Relegation from the National League
12	Long Eaton United (R)	22	1	0	21	12	182	−170	3	Relegation from the National League

Updated to match(es) played on 7 May 2023. Source: The Football Association
Rules for classification: 1) Points; 2) Goal difference; 3) Number of goals scored
(C) Champions; (P) Promoted; (R) Relegated

==== Division One South East ====
Pos	Team	Pld	W	D	L	GF	GA	GD	Pts	Promotion or relegation
1	Hashtag United (C, P)	18	16	1	1	77	14	+63	49	Promotion to the Southern Premier Division
2	AFC Wimbledon	18	14	3	1	45	13	+32	45	
3	Actonians	18	10	2	6	52	26	+26	32	
4	Norwich City	18	9	3	6	32	34	−2	30	
5	London Seaward	18	8	5	5	34	31	+3	29	
6	Ashford Town	18	7	2	9	34	41	−7	23	
7	Queens Park Rangers	18	6	4	8	31	36	−5	22	
8	Cambridge United	18	3	5	10	30	45	−15	14	
9	Cambridge City	18	2	1	15	17	50	−33	7	
10	Chesham United	18	2	0	16	17	79	−62	6	
11	Hounslow (W)	0	0	0	0	0	0	0	0	Withdrew from league
12	Wymondham Town (W)	0	0	0	0	0	0	0	0	Withdrew from league

Source: The Football Association
Rules for classification: 1) Points; 2) Goal difference; 3) Number of goals scored
(C) Champions; (P) Promoted; (W) Withdrew from the league

==== Division One South West ====
Pos	Team	Pld	W	D	L	GF	GA	GD	Pts	Promotion or relegation
1	Cardiff City Ladies (C, P)	22	19	1	2	86	13	+73	58	Promotion to the Southern Premier Division
2	Exeter City	22	19	1	2	83	18	+65	58	
3	Moneyfields	21	13	5	3	53	27	+26	44	
4	AFC Bournemouth	22	13	4	5	59	21	+38	43	
5	Southampton Women	22	13	3	6	50	31	+19	42	
6	Swindon Town	22	8	4	10	35	48	−13	28	
7	Portishead Town	22	8	1	13	32	63	−31	25	
8	Selsey	22	7	1	14	34	37	−3	22	
9	Keynsham Town	22	7	1	14	36	64	−28	22	
10	Maidenhead United	21	6	3	12	25	42	−17	21	
11	Larkhall Athletic (R)	21	4	0	17	19	62	−43	12	Relegation from the National League
12	AFC St Austell (R)	21	1	0	20	27	113	−86	3	Relegation from the National League

Updated to match(es) played on 7 May 2023. Source: The Football Association
Rules for classification: 1) Points; 2) Goal difference; 3) Number of goals scored
(C) Champions; (P) Promoted; (R) Relegated

=== Women's FA Cup ===
==== Final ====
14 May 2023
14:30 BST

Chelsea	1–0	Manchester United
Kerr 68'	FA report BBC report

Wembley Stadium, London
Attendance: 77,390
Referee: Emily Heaslip (Suffolk)

=== FA Women's League Cup ===
==== Final ====
5 March 2023
15:00 GMT

Arsenal	3–1	Chelsea
Blackstenius 16'; Little 24' (pen.); Charles 45+5' (o.g.)	Report	Kerr 2'

Selhurst Park, Selhurst
Attendance: 19,010
Referee: Kirsty Dowle

== Managerial changes ==
This is a list of changes of managers within English league football:

Team	Outgoing manager	Manner of departure	Date of departure	Position in table	Incoming manager	Date of appointment
Lincoln City	(England) Michael Appleton	Mutual consent	30 April 2022	Pre-season	(Republic of Ireland) Mark Kennedy	12 May 2022
Charlton Athletic	(England) Johnnie Jackson	Sacked	3 May 2022	Pre-season	(England) Ben Garner	8 June 2022
Fleetwood Town	(Scotland) Stephen Crainey	End of contract	4 May 2022	Pre-season	(Scotland) Scott Brown	12 May 2022
Reading	(England) Paul Ince (Barbados) Michael Gilkes	End of interim spell	7 May 2022	Pre-season	(England) Paul Ince	16 May 2022
Queens Park Rangers	(England) Mark Warburton	End of contract	7 May 2022	Pre-season	(England) Michael Beale	1 June 2022
Blackburn Rovers	(England) Tony Mowbray	End of contract	7 May 2022	Pre-season	(Denmark) Jon Dahl Tomasson	14 June 2022
AFC Wimbledon	(Wales) Mark Bowen	End of interim spell	7 May 2022	Pre-season	(England) Johnnie Jackson	16 May 2022
Barnsley	(Republic of Ireland) Martin Devaney	End of interim spell	8 May 2022	Pre-season	(Northern Ireland) Michael Duff	15 June 2022
Hartlepool United	(England) Michael Nelson	End of caretaker spell	8 May 2022	Pre-season	(Scotland) Paul Hartley	3 June 2022
Crawley Town	(England) Lewis Young	End of caretaker spell	8 May 2022	Pre-season	(Seychelles) Kevin Betsy	6 June 2022
Forest Green Rovers	(Wales) Rob Edwards	Signed by Watford	11 May 2022	Pre-season	(England) Ian Burchnall	27 May 2022
Barrow	(England) Phil Brown	End of interim spell	12 May 2022	Pre-season	(England) Pete Wild	27 May 2022
Salford City	(England) Gary Bowyer	Sacked	17 May 2022	Pre-season	(England) Neil Wood	20 May 2022
Watford	(England) Roy Hodgson	End of contract	22 May 2022	Pre-season	(Wales) Rob Edwards	23 May 2022
Manchester United	(Germany) Ralf Rangnick	End of interim spell	22 May 2022	Pre-season	(Netherlands) Erik ten Hag	23 May 2022
Burnley	(England) Mike Jackson (England) Connor King (England) Ben Mee (joint-caretakers)	End of caretaker spell	22 May 2022	Pre-season	(Belgium) Vincent Kompany	14 June 2022
Blackpool	(England) Neil Critchley	Signed by Aston Villa as assistant head coach	2 June 2022	Pre-season	(England) Michael Appleton	17 June 2022
Swindon Town	(England) Ben Garner	Signed by Charlton Athletic	8 June 2022	Pre-season	(England) Scott Lindsey	20 June 2022
Cheltenham Town	(Northern Ireland) Michael Duff	Signed by Barnsley	13 June 2022	Pre-season	(England) Wade Elliott	27 June 2022
Derby County	(England) Wayne Rooney	Resigned	24 June 2022	Pre-season	(England) Liam Rosenior (interim)	26 June 2022
Birmingham City	(England) Lee Bowyer	Sacked	2 July 2022	Pre-season	(England) John Eustace	3 July 2022
Huddersfield Town	(Spain) Carlos Corberán	Resigned	7 July 2022	Pre-season	(England) Danny Schofield	7 July 2022
Rochdale	(Scotland) Robbie Stockdale	Sacked	18 August 2022	24th	(England) Jim Bentley	29 August 2022
Stoke City	(Northern Ireland) Michael O'Neill	Sacked	25 August 2022	21st	(Scotland) Alex Neil	28 August 2022
Sunderland	(Scotland) Alex Neil	Signed by Stoke City	28 August 2022	12th	(England) Tony Mowbray	30 August 2022
Bournemouth	(England) Scott Parker	Sacked	30 August 2022	17th	(England) Gary O'Neil (Note: O'Neil was initially appointed as caretaker manager, but the move was made permanent on 27 November 2022.)	30 August 2022
Burton Albion	(Netherlands) Jimmy Floyd Hasselbaink	Resigned	5 September 2022	24th	(Tunisia) Dino Maamria	6 September 2022
Chelsea	(Germany) Thomas Tuchel	Sacked	7 September 2022	6th	(England) Graham Potter	8 September 2022
Brighton & Hove Albion	(England) Graham Potter	Signed by Chelsea	8 September 2022	4th	(Italy) Roberto De Zerbi	18 September 2022
Huddersfield Town	(England) Danny Schofield	Sacked	14 September 2022	23rd	(Scotland) Mark Fotheringham	28 September 2022
Cardiff City	(Wales) Steve Morison	Sacked	18 September 2022	18th	(England) Mark Hudson (Note: Hudson was initially appointed as caretaker manager, but the move was made permanent on 14 November 2022.)	18 September 2022
Hartlepool United	(Scotland) Paul Hartley	Sacked	18 September 2022	23rd	(England) Keith Curle (Note: Curle was initially appointed as caretaker manager, but the move was made permanent on 3 December 2022.)	18 September 2022
Colchester United	(England) Wayne Brown	Sacked	18 September 2022	21st	(England) Matt Bloomfield	30 September 2022
Derby County	(England) Liam Rosenior	End of interim spell	22 September 2022	7th	(England) Paul Warne	22 September 2022
Rotherham United	(England) Paul Warne	Signed by Derby County	22 September 2022	8th	(England) Matt Taylor	4 October 2022
Watford	(Wales) Rob Edwards	Sacked	26 September 2022	10th	(Croatia) Slaven Bilić	26 September 2022
Hull City	(Georgia (country)) Shota Arveladze	Sacked	30 September 2022	20th	(England) Liam Rosenior	3 November 2022
Wolverhampton Wanderers	(Portugal) Bruno Lage	Sacked	2 October 2022	18th	(Spain) Julen Lopetegui	14 November 2022
Middlesbrough	(England) Chris Wilder	Sacked	3 October 2022	22nd	(England) Michael Carrick	24 October 2022
Exeter City	(England) Matt Taylor	Signed by Rotherham United	4 October 2022	11th	(Scotland) Gary Caldwell	24 October 2022
Crawley Town	(Seychelles) Kevin Betsy	Sacked	9 October 2022	24th	(England) Matthew Etherington	27 November 2022
West Bromwich Albion	(England) Steve Bruce	Sacked	10 October 2022	22nd	(Spain) Carlos Corberán	25 October 2022
Newport County	(Wales) James Rowberry	Sacked	10 October 2022	18th	(Republic of Ireland) Graham Coughlan	20 October 2022
Doncaster Rovers	(England) Gary McSheffrey	Sacked	17 October 2022	12th	(England) Danny Schofield	20 October 2022
Aston Villa	(England) Steven Gerrard	Sacked	20 October 2022	17th	(Spain) Unai Emery	1 November 2022
Crewe Alexandra	(England) Alex Morris	Demoted to assistant manager	4 November 2022	16th	(England) Lee Bell (Note: Bell was initially appointed as caretaker manager, but the move was made permanent on 1 December 2022.)	4 November 2022
Southampton	(Austria) Ralph Hasenhüttl	Sacked	7 November 2022	18th	(Wales) Nathan Jones	10 November 2022
Luton Town	(Wales) Nathan Jones	Signed by Southampton	10 November 2022	9th	(Wales) Rob Edwards	17 November 2022
Wigan Athletic	(England) Leam Richardson	Sacked	10 November 2022	23rd	(Ivory Coast) Kolo Touré	29 November 2022
Queens Park Rangers	(England) Michael Beale	Signed by Rangers	28 November 2022	7th	(England) Neil Critchley	11 December 2022
Charlton Athletic	(England) Ben Garner	Sacked	5 December 2022	17th	(England) Dean Holden	20 December 2022
Milton Keynes Dons	(England) Liam Manning	Sacked	11 December 2022	23rd	(England) Mark Jackson	23 December 2022
Norwich City	(England) Dean Smith	Sacked	27 December 2022	5th	(United States) David Wagner	6 January 2023
Crawley Town	(England) Matthew Etherington	Mutual Consent	29 December 2022	20th	(England) Scott Lindsey	11 January 2023
Portsmouth	(England) Danny Cowley	Sacked	2 January 2023	12th	(England) John Mousinho	20 January 2023
Peterborough United	(Northern Ireland) Grant McCann	Sacked	4 January 2023	8th	(Scotland) Darren Ferguson	4 January 2023
Swindon Town	(England) Scott Lindsey	Signed by Crawley Town	11 January 2023	8th	(England) Jody Morris	31 January 2023
Cardiff City	(England) Mark Hudson	Sacked	14 January 2023	21st	(France) Sabri Lamouchi	27 January 2023
Blackpool	(England) Michael Appleton	Sacked	18 January 2023	23rd	(Republic of Ireland) Mick McCarthy	19 January 2023
Everton	(England) Frank Lampard	Sacked	23 January 2023	19th	(England) Sean Dyche	30 January 2023
Forest Green Rovers	(England) Ian Burchnall	Sacked	25 January 2023	24th	(Scotland) Duncan Ferguson	26 January 2023
Wigan Athletic	(Ivory Coast) Kolo Touré	Sacked	26 January 2023	24th	(Scotland) Shaun Maloney	28 January 2023
Leeds United	(United States) Jesse Marsch	Sacked	6 February 2023	17th	(Spain) Javi Gracia	21 February 2023
Huddersfield Town	(Scotland) Mark Fotheringham	Sacked	8 February 2023	22nd	(England) Neil Warnock	13 February 2023
Southampton	(Wales) Nathan Jones	Sacked	12 February 2023	20th	(Spain) Rubén Sellés (Note: Sellés was initially appointed as caretaker manager, but the move was made permanent on 24 February 2022.)	12 February 2023
Queens Park Rangers	(England) Neil Critchley	Sacked	19 February 2023	17th	(England) Gareth Ainsworth	21 February 2023
Wycombe Wanderers	(England) Gareth Ainsworth	Signed by Queens Park Rangers	21 February 2023	7th	(England) Matt Bloomfield	21 February 2023
Colchester United	(England) Matt Bloomfield	Signed by Wycombe Wanderers	21 February 2023	18th	(England) Ben Garner	2 March 2023
Hartlepool United	(England) Keith Curle	Sacked	22 February 2023	22nd	(England) John Askey	23 February 2023
Oxford United	(England) Karl Robinson	Sacked	26 February 2023	17th	(England) Liam Manning	11 March 2023
Watford	(Croatia) Slaven Bilić	Sacked	7 March 2023	9th	(England) Chris Wilder	7 March 2023
Crystal Palace	(France) Patrick Vieira	Sacked	17 March 2023	12th	(England) Roy Hodgson	21 March 2023
Tranmere Rovers	(Scotland) Micky Mellon	Sacked	19 March 2023	14th	(England) Ian Dawes (Note: Dawes was initially appointed as caretaker manager, but the move was made permanent on 4 May 2023.)	19 March 2023
Tottenham Hotspur	(Italy) Antonio Conte	Mutual Consent	26 March 2023	4th	(Italy) Cristian Stellini (interim)	26 March 2023
Rochdale	(England) Jim Bentley	Sacked	27 March 2023	24th	(Scotland) Jimmy McNulty (Note: McNulty was initially appointed as caretaker manager, but the move was made permanent on 12 May 2023.)	27 March 2023
Leicester City	(Northern Ireland) Brendan Rodgers	Mutual Consent	2 April 2023	19th	(England) Dean Smith (interim)	10 April 2023
Chelsea	(England) Graham Potter	Sacked	2 April 2023	11th	(England) Frank Lampard (caretaker)	6 April 2023
Blackpool	(Republic of Ireland) Mick McCarthy	Mutual consent	8 April 2023	23rd	(Scotland) Stephen Dobbie (caretaker)	8 April 2023
Reading	(England) Paul Ince	Sacked	11 April 2023	22nd	(Republic of Ireland) Noel Hunt (interim)	11 April 2023
Port Vale	(England) Darrell Clarke	Sacked	17 April 2023	18th	(England) Andy Crosby (Note: Crosby was initially appointed as caretaker manager, but the move was made permanent on 12 May 2023.)	17 April 2023
Walsall	(Wales) Michael Flynn	Sacked	19 April 2023	15th	(England) Mat Sadler (Note: Sadler was initially appointed as caretaker manager, but the move was made permanent on 18 May 2023.)	19 April 2023
Tottenham Hotspur	(Italy) Cristian Stellini (interim)	Sacked	24 April 2023	5th	(England) Ryan Mason (interim)	24 April 2023
Swindon Town	(England) Jody Morris	Sacked	1 May 2023	10th	(England) Steve Mildenhall and (Republic of Ireland) Gavin Gunning (Interim)	1 May 2023
Leeds United	(Spain) Javi Gracia	Sacked	3 May 2023	17th	(England) Sam Allardyce (Interim)	3 May 2023

== Deaths ==
- 3 June 2022: Frank Clarke, 79, Shrewsbury Town, Queens Park Rangers, Ipswich Town and Carlisle United forward.
- 3 June 2022: Geoff Hunter, 62, Crewe Alexandra, Port Vale and Wrexham midfielder.
- 4 June 2022: Peter Neale, 88, Oldham Athletic, Scunthorpe United and Chesterfield defender.
- 9 June 2022: Billy Bingham, 90, Northern Ireland, Sunderland, Luton Town, Everton and Port Vale outside right, who also managed Southport, Plymouth Argyle, Everton and Mansfield Town.
- 9 June 2022: Ron Farmer, 86, Coventry City, Nottingham Forest and Notts County midfielder.
- 10 June 2022: Bobby Hope, 78, Scotland, West Bromwich Albion, Birmingham City and Sheffield Wednesday inside forward.
- 12 June 2022: Alex Russell, 78, Southport, Blackburn Rovers and Tranmere Rovers midfielder.
- 19 June 2022: Colin Grainger, 89, England, Wrexham, Sheffield United, Sunderland, Leeds United, Port Vale and Doncaster Rovers outside left.
- c. 20 June 2022: Bruce Crawford, 83, Blackpool and Tranmere Rovers wing half.
- 22 June 2022: Graham Tutt, 65, Charlton Athletic goalkeeper.
- 24 June 2022: Martyn Forrest, 43, Bury midfielder.
- 27 June 2022: Albert Derrick, 82, Newport County inside forward.
- 1 July 2022: Gary Pearson, 45, Darlington defender/midfielder.
- 2 July 2022: Andy Goram, 58, Scotland, Oldham Athletic, Notts County, Sheffield United, Manchester United and Coventry City goalkeeper.
- 3 July 2022: Dave Shearer, 63, Middlesbrough, Grimsby Town, Gillingham, AFC Bournemouth, Scunthorpe United and Darlington striker.
- 4 July 2022: Clive Middlemass, 77, Workington defender, who also managed Carlisle United and Darlington.
- 5 July 2022: Len Casey MBE, 91, Chelsea and Plymouth Argyle wing half.
- 8 July 2022: Henry Mowbray, 75, Blackpool and Bolton Wanderers defender.
- 8 July 2022: Phil Walker, 67, Millwall and Charlton Athletic midfielder.
- 9 July 2022: Davie Robb, 74, Scotland and Norwich City forward.
- 10 July 2022: Ken Armstrong, 63, Southampton and Birmingham City defender.
- 13 July 2022: Stuart Chapman, 71, Port Vale midfielder.
- 19 July 2022: Jack Parry, 90, Derby County inside forward.
- 24 July 2022: Neil Hague, 72, Rotherham United, Plymouth Argyle, AFC Bournemouth, Huddersfield Town and Darlington defender.
- 28 July 2022: Terry Gulliver, 77, AFC Bournemouth right back
- 28 July 2022: Terry Neill, 80, Northern Ireland, Arsenal and Hull City defender, who also managed Hull City, Northern Ireland, Tottenham Hotspur and Arsenal.
- 1 August 2022: John Hughes, 79, Scotland, Crystal Palace and Sunderland outside left/striker.
- 3 August 2022: Andrejs Rubins, 43, Latvia and Crystal Palace midfielder.
- c. 3 August 2022: Adrian Thorne, 83, Brighton & Hove Albion, Plymouth Argyle, Exeter City and Leyton Orient winger.
- 5 August 2022: Aled Owen, 88, Tottenham Hotspur, Ipswich Town and Wrexham winger.
- 9 August 2022: Mick Jones, 75, Notts County and Peterborough United defender, who also managed Mansfield Town, Halifax Town, Peterborough United and Plymouth Argyle.
- 10 August 2022: Billy Legg, 74, Huddersfield Town full back.
- 11 August 2022: Pat Liney, 86, Bradford City goalkeeper.
- 15 August 2022: Lenny Johnrose, 52, Blackburn Rovers, Hartlepool United, Bury, Burnley and Swansea City midfielder.
- 21 August 2022: David Armstrong, 67, England, Middlesbrough, Southampton and AFC Bournemouth midfielder.
- c. 24 August 2022: Billy Hodgson, 87, Sheffield United, Leicester City, Derby County, Rotherham United and York City inside forward/winger.
- c. 25 August 2022: Dave Rudge, 74, Aston Villa, Hereford United and Torquay United midfielder.
- 27 August 2022: Tony Nelson, 92, Newport County and AFC Bournemouth defender.
- 28 August 2022: Sammy Chung, 90, Reading, Norwich City and Watford striker, who also managed Wolverhampton Wanderers and Doncaster Rovers.
- c. 29 August 2022: Vince McNeice, 83, Watford defender.
- c. 30 August 2022: Tommy Carpenter, 97, Watford goalkeeper.
- 30 August 2022: Michael Slocombe, 81, Bristol Rovers defender.
- 31 August 2022: Bob Wesson, 82, Coventry City and Walsall goalkeeper.
- 8 September 2022: Dave Smith, 88, Burnley, Brighton & Hove Albion and Bristol City defender, who also managed Mansfield Town, Southend United, Plymouth Argyle and Torquay United.
- 13 September 2022: Fred Callaghan, 77, Fulham defender, who also managed Brentford.
- 21 September 2022: Jimmy Elder, 94, Portsmouth and Colchester United wing half.
- 25 September 2022: Roy MacLaren, 92, Bury and Sheffield Wednesday goalkeeper.
- 8 October 2022: John Duncan, 73, Tottenham Hotspur, Derby County and Scunthorpe United forward, who also managed Scunthorpe United, Hartlepool United, Chesterfield and Ipswich Town.
- 9 October 2022: Kevin Thomas, 78, Blackpool, Tranmere Rovers, Oxford United and Southport goalkeeper.
- 10 October 2022: Keith Eddy, 77, Barrow, Watford and Sheffield United midfielder.
- 2 November 2022: Ronnie Radford, 79, Newport County and Hereford United midfielder.
- 7 November 2022: Eamonn Darcy, 89, Oldham Athletic goalkeeper.
- 10 November 2022: Billy Russell, 87, Sheffield United, Bolton Wanderers and Rochdale inside/outside forward.
- 12 November 2022: John Connaughton, 73, Manchester United, Sheffield United, Port Vale and Altrincham goalkeeper.
- 18 November 2022: Francis Joseph, 62, Wimbledon, Brentford, Reading, Sheffield United, Gillingham, Crewe Alexandra and Fulham forward.
- 20 November 2022: Frank Rankmore, 83, Wales, Cardiff City, Peterborough United and Northampton Town defender.
- 23 November 2022: David Johnson, 71, England, Everton, Ipswich Town, Liverpool, Manchester City and Preston North End striker.
- 24 November 2022: Neil Robinson, 65, Everton, Swansea City, Grimsby Town and Darlington defender/midfielder.
- 27 November 2022: Mick Meagan, 88, Republic of Ireland, Everton, Huddersfield Town and Halifax Town defender.
- 27 November 2022: Maurice Norman, 88, England, Norwich City and Tottenham Hotspur defender.
- 8 December 2022: Tony Allen, 83, England, Stoke City and Bury defender.
- 14 December 2022: Alex Duchart, 89, Southend United winger.
- 23 December 2022: George Cohen MBE, 83, England World Cup winner and Fulham defender.
- 24 December 2022: Keith Sanderson, 82, Plymouth Argyle and Queens Park Rangers midfielder.
- 29 December 2022: John Jackson, 80, Crystal Palace, Leyton Orient, Millwall, Ipswich Town and Hereford United goalkeeper.
- 29 December 2022: Jackie Overfield, 90, Leeds United, Sunderland, Peterborough United and Bradford City winger.
- c. 30 December 2022: Derek Lampe, 85, Fulham defender.
- 6 January 2023: Gianluca Vialli, 58, Italy and Chelsea striker, who also managed Chelsea and Watford.
- 8 January 2023: Barry Lines, 80, Northampton Town outside left.
- 19 January 2023: Peter Thomas, 78, Republic of Ireland and Coventry City goalkeeper.
- 19 January 2023: Anton Walkes, 25, Tottenham Hotspur and Portsmouth defender and midfielder.
- 23 January 2023: Patrizio Billio, 48, Crystal Palace midfielder.
- 6 February 2023: Peter Allen, 76, Leyton Orient and Millwall midfielder, who is Orient's record appearance holder.
- c. 6 February 2023: Christian Atsu, 31, Ghana, Chelsea, Everton, AFC Bournemouth and Newcastle United winger.
- 7 February 2023: Roy Wood, 92, Leeds United goalkeeper.
- 12 February 2023: Tony Lee, 75, Bradford City and Darlington winger.
- 16 February 2023: Kevin Bird, 70, Mansfield Town and Huddersfield Town defender.
- 16 February 2023: Colin Dobson, 82, Sheffield Wednesday, Huddersfield Town and Bristol Rovers inside forward.
- 16 February 2023: Kenny Simpkins, 79, Wrexham and Hartlepool United goalkeeper.
- 27 February 2023: Sammy Winston, 44, Leyton Orient striker.
- 8 March 2023: Martin Gorry, 68, Barnsley, Newcastle United and Hartlepool United left back.
- 9 March 2023: Alan Jones, 77, Swansea City, Hereford United and Southport defender.
- c. 16 March 2023: Don Megson, 86, Sheffield Wednesday and Bristol Rovers defender, who also managed Bristol Rovers and AFC Bournemouth.
- 21 March 2023: Willie Bell, 85, Scotland, Leeds United, Leicester City and Brighton & Hove Albion left back, who also managed Birmingham City and Lincoln City.
- 22 March 2023: Tony Knapp, 86, Leicester City, Southampton, Coventry City and Tranmere Rovers defender.
- 4 April 2023: John Sainty, 76, Reading, AFC Bournemouth and Aldershot forward, who also managed Chester City.
- c. 14 April 2023: Andy Mullen, 94, Workington and Scunthorpe United outside left.
- 16 April 2023: Eddie Colquhoun, 78, Scotland, Bury, West Bromwich Albion and Sheffield United defender.
- 8 May 2023: Neil Matthews, 56, Grimsby Town, Halifax Town, Stockport County and Lincoln City striker.
- 11 May 2023: Andy Provan, 79, Barnsley, York City, Chester City, Wrexham, Southport and Torquay United winger.
- 13 May 2023: John Flood, 90, Southampton and AFC Bournemouth winger.
- 3 June 2023: Josser Watling, 98, former Bristol Rovers defender.

== Retirements ==
- 1 June 2022: Sebastian Prödl, 34, former Austria and Watford defender.
- 2 June 2022: Valon Behrami, 37, former Switzerland, West Ham United and Watford midfielder.
- 4 June 2022: Carlos Tevez, 38, former Argentina, West Ham United, Manchester United and Manchester City forward.
- 14 June 2022: Arturo Lupoli, 35, former Arsenal, Derby County, Norwich City and Sheffield United forward.
- 17 June 2022: Artur Boruc, 42, former Poland, Southampton and AFC Bournemouth goalkeeper.
- 17 June 2022: Jason Pearce, 34, former AFC Bournemouth, Portsmouth, Leeds United, Wigan Athletic and Charlton Athletic defender.
- 18 June 2022: Paul Caddis, 34, former Scotland, Swindon Town, Birmingham City, Bury, Blackburn Rovers and Bradford City defender.
- 19 June 2022: Aleksandar Kolarov, 36, former Serbia and Manchester City defender.
- 22 June 2022: Daryl Janmaat, 32, former Netherlands, Newcastle United and Watford right back.
- 22 June 2022: Jamie Ness, 31, former Stoke City, Scunthorpe United and Plymouth Argyle midfielder.
- 8 July 2022: Giles Coke, 36, former Mansfield Town, Northampton Town, Sheffield Wednesday, Ipswich Town, Chesterfield, Oldham Athletic and Grimsby Town midfielder.
- 8 July 2022: Jack Wilshere, 30, former England, Arsenal, Bolton Wanderers, AFC Bournemouth and West Ham United midfielder.
- 12 July 2022: Chris Burke, 38, former Scotland, Cardiff City, Birmingham City and Nottingham Forest winger.
- 19 July 2022: Tommy Oar, 30, former Australia and Ipswich Town midfielder.
- 20 July 2022: James Meredith, 34, former Australia, Cambridge United, Chesterfield, Shrewsbury Town, Telford, York City, Bradford City and Millwall defender.
- 10 August 2022: Ben Watson, 37, former Crystal Palace, Wigan Athletic, Watford, Nottingham Forest and Charlton Athletic midfielder.
- 16 August 2022: Nacho Monreal, 36, former Spain and Arsenal defender.
- 26 August 2022: Adam El-Abd, 37, former Egypt, Brighton & Hove Albion, Bristol City, Shrewsbury Town, Wycombe Wanderers and Stevenage defender.
- 29 August 2022: Nathan Baker, 31, former Aston Villa and Bristol City defender.
- 3 September 2022: Craig Bryson, 35, former Scotland and Derby County midfielder.
- 9 September 2022: Davide Santon, 31, former Italy and Newcastle United defender.
- 12 September 2022: Matty Blair, 33, former York City, Fleetwood Town, Mansfield Town, Doncaster Rovers and Cheltenham Town defender.
- 21 September 2022: Charlie Adam, 36, former Scotland, Blackpool, Liverpool, Stoke City and Reading midfielder.
- 23 September 2022: Lewis Macleod, 28, former Brentford, Wigan Athletic and Plymouth Argyle midfielder.
- 25 September 2022: Lee Wallace, 35, former Scotland and Queens Park Rangers defender.
- 27 September 2022: Fabian Delph, 32, former England, Leeds United, Aston Villa, Manchester City and Everton midfielder.
- 27 September 2022: John Obi Mikel, 35, former Nigeria, Chelsea, Middlesbrough and Stoke City midfielder.
- 28 September 2022: Ramires, 35, former Brazil and Chelsea midfielder.
- 7 October 2022: Jake Howells, 31, former Luton Town defender/midfielder.
- 9 October 2022: Jacques Maghoma, 34, former DR Congo, Burton Albion, Sheffield Wednesday and Birmingham City midfielder.
- 10 October 2022: Enock Mwepu, 24, former Zambia and Brighton & Hove Albion midfielder.
- 13 October 2022: Jota, 31, former Brentford, Birmingham City and Aston Villa midfielder.
- 17 October 2022: Gonzalo Higuaín, 35, former Argentina and Chelsea forward.
- 18 October 2022, Jon Flanagan, 29, former England, Liverpool, Burnley and Bolton Wanderers defender.
- 19 October 2022, Anthony Pilkington, 34, former Republic of Ireland, Blackburn Rovers, Stockport County, Huddersfield Town, Norwich City, Cardiff City, Wigan Athletic and Fleetwood Town midfielder.
- 23 October 2022, Ben Turner, 34, former Coventry City, Peterborough United, Oldham Athletic, Cardiff City, Burton Albion and Mansfield Town defender.
- 28 October 2022: Roman Pavlyuchenko, 40, former Russia and Tottenham Hotspur striker.
- 6 November 2022: Sebastian Larsson, 37, former Sweden, Arsenal, Birmingham City, Sunderland and Hull City midfielder.
- 7 November 2022: Neil Taylor, 33, former Wales, Great Britain, Wrexham, Swansea City, Aston Villa and Middlesbrough defender.
- 8 November 2022: Gerard Piqué, 35, former Spain and Manchester United defender.
- 11 November 2022: Anders Lindegaard, 38, former Denmark, Manchester United, West Bromwich Albion, Preston North End and Burnley goalkeeper.
- 15 November 2022: Aaron Lennon, 35, former England, Leeds United, Tottenham Hotspur, Everton and Burnley winger.
- 16 November 2022: Gary Cahill, 36, former England, Aston Villa, Bolton Wanderers, Chelsea, Crystal Palace and AFC Bournemouth defender.
- 29 November 2022: Harry Middleton, 27, former Doncaster Rovers and Port Vale midfielder.
- 2 January 2023: Harry Forrester, 32, former Brentford and Doncaster Rovers midfielder.
- 6 January 2023: Tyrell Belford, 28, former Swindon Town goalkeeper.
- 7 January 2023: Brian Murphy, 39, former Swansea City, Ipswich Town, Queens Park Rangers, Portsmouth and Cardiff City goalkeeper.
- 8 January 2023: Craig Mackail-Smith, 38, former Scotland, Peterborough United, Brighton & Hove Albion, Luton Town and Wycombe Wanderers striker.
- 9 January 2023: Gareth Bale MBE, 33, former Wales, Southampton and Tottenham Hotspur winger, who holds the record for most caps and goals for his country.
- 23 January 2023: Jem Karacan, 33, former Reading, Bolton Wanderers, Millwall, Scunthorpe United, and Radcliffe midfielder.
- 8 February 2023: Jeff Hughes, 37, former Northern Ireland, Lincoln City, Crystal Palace, Peterborough United, Bristol Rovers, Notts County, Fleetwood Town, Cambridge United and Tranmere Rovers midfielder.
- 14 February 2023: Alfie Mawson, 29, former Wycombe Wanderers, Barnsley, Swansea City, Fulham and Bristol City defender.
- 14 February 2023: Nicky Hunt, 39, former Bolton Wanderers, Birmingham City, Derby County, Bristol City, Preston North End, Rotherham United, Accrington Stanley, Mansfield Town, Leyton Orient, Notts County, Crewe Alexandra, Darlington, and Ashton United defender.
- 22 February 2023: Olly Lee, 31, former Dagenham & Redbridge, Gillingham, Barnet, Birmingham City, Plymouth Argyle and Luton Town midfielder.
- 17 March 2023: Lucas Leiva, 36, former Brazil and Liverpool midfielder.
- 22 March 2023: Mesut Özil, 34, former Germany and Arsenal midfielder.
- 23 March 2023: Bojan Krkić, 32, former Spain and Stoke City forward.
- 28 March 2023: Dale Stephens, 33, former Bury, Oldham Athletic, Rochdale, Southampton, Charlton Athletic, Brighton & Hove Albion and Burnley midfielder.
- 6 April 2023: Izzy Brown, 26, former West Bromwich Albion, Chelsea, Rotherham United, Huddersfield Town, Brighton & Hove Albion, Leeds United, Luton Town, Sheffield Wednesday forward.
- 11 April 2023: Rob Kiernan, 32, former Watford, Wigan Athletic and Southend United defender.
- 21 April 2023: Nick Anderton, 26, former Blackpool, Accrington Stanley, Carlisle United and Bristol Rovers defender.
- 4 May 2023: Chris Gunter, 33, former Wales, Cardiff City, Tottenham Hotspur, Nottingham Forest, Reading, Charlton Athletic and AFC Wimbledon defender.
- 5 May 2023, Neil Danns, 40, former Guyana, Blackburn Rovers, Blackpool, Hartlepool United, Colchester United, Birmingham City, Crystal Palace, Leicester City, Bristol City, Huddersfield Town, Bolton Wanderers, Bury, Tranmere Rovers, Radcliffe, FC Halifax Town, and Macclesfield midfielder
- 5 May 2023, Mark Duffy, 37, former Liverpool, Wrexham, Vauxhall Motors, Prescot Cables, Southport, Morecambe, Scunthorpe United, Doncaster Rovers, Birmingham City, Chesterfield, Burton Albion, Sheffield United, Stoke City, Fleetwood Town, Tranmere Rovers, and Macclesfield midfielder
- 7 May 2023: Glenn Whelan, 39, former Republic of Ireland, Manchester City, Sheffield Wednesday, Stoke City, Aston Villa, Fleetwood Town and Bristol Rovers midfielder.
- 8 May 2023: Rory McArdle, 35, former Northern Ireland, Sheffield Wednesday, Rochdale, Bradford City, Scunthorpe United, Exeter City and Harrogate Town defender.
- 8 May 2023: Shaun Pearson, 34, former Grimsby Town defender.
- 9 May 2023: Jason Taylor, 36, former Stockport County, Rotherham United, Rochdale, Cheltenham Town, Northampton Town and Barrow midfielder.
- 12 May 2023: Cole Skuse, 37, former Bristol City, Ipswich Town and Colchester United midfielder.
- 15 May 2023: Harry Lennon, 28, former Charlton Athletic and Southend United defender.
- 16 May 2023: Liam Trotter, 34, former Ipswich Town, Millwall, Bolton Wanderers and AFC Wimbledon midfielder.
- 17 May 2023: Michael Mancienne, 35, former Seychelles, Chelsea, Queens Park Rangers, Wolverhampton Wanderers, Nottingham Forest and Burton Albion defender.
- 19 May 2023: Mathieu Baudry, 35, former A.F.C. Bournemouth, Leyton Orient, Doncaster Rovers, Milton Keynes Dons and Swindon Town defender.
- 19 May 2023: Siem de Jong, 34, former Netherlands and Newcastle United forward.
- 20 May 2023: Alex Rodman, 36, former Aldershot Town, York City, Newport County, Notts County, Shrewsbury Town and Bristol Rovers midfielder.
- 24 May 2023: Brad Jones, 41, former Australia, Middlesbrough, Stockport County, Blackpool, Sheffield Wednesday, Liverpool, Derby County and Bradford City goalkeeper.
- 24 May 2023: Chris Taylor, 36, former Oldham Athletic, Millwall, Blackburn Rovers, Bolton Wanderers, Blackpool, Bradford City, Barrow, Radcliffe, and FC United of Manchester midfielder.
- 25 May 2023: Tamás Priskin, 36, former Hungary, Watford and Ipswich Town forward.
- 31 May 2023: Gaetano Berardi, 34, former Switzerland and Leeds United defender.
- 5 June 2023: Zlatan Ibrahimović, 41, former Sweden and Manchester United forward.
- 14 June 2023: Rhys Williams, 34, former Australia, Middlesbrough, Burnley and Charlton Athletic defender.
