= Geggus =

Geggus is a surname. Notable persons with the surname include:

- Charlie Geggus (1862–1917), American baseball player
- John Geggus (1889–1951), English footballer
