= Bruce Crawford (footballer) =

English footballer (1938–2022)

Personal information
- Date of birth: 10 October 1938
- Place of birth: Preston, England
- Date of death: June 2022 (aged 83)
- Position: Wing half

Senior career*
| Years | Team | Apps | (Gls) |
| 1959–1965 | Blackpool | 98 | (11) |
| 1965–1967 | Tranmere Rovers | 26 | (5) |
| 1967–1968 | Fleetwood F.C. | 18 | (3) |
| Total | | 142 | (19) |
- * Club domestic league appearances and goals

John Robert Bruce Crawford (10 October 1938 – June 2022) was an English footballer who played as a wing half in the Football League for Blackpool and Tranmere Rovers. He later briefly played for Fleetwood FC in the Lancashire Combination. He also made one appearance for England U 23s against Scotland in February 1962. Crawford died in June 2022, at the age of 83.
