= Derek Lampe =

English footballer

Personal information
- Full name: Derek Stanley Lampe
- Date of birth: 20 May 1937 (age 89)
- Place of birth: Edmonton, London, England
- Position: Centre half

Senior career*
Years	Team	Apps	(Gls)
1956–1962	Fulham	88	(0)

International career
- England Youth
- * Club domestic league appearances and goals

Derek Lampe (born 20 May 1937) is an English former professional footballer who played for Fulham and represented England Youth, playing in the position of centre half.

Prior to signing up for Fulham, Lampe played for Edmonton, London and Middlesex Schools and trained with Tottenham Hotspur. Lampe joined Fulham as a junior in the summer of 1952. He progressed to the senior team in May 1954, and made his first class debut against West Ham United in August 1956. Lampe sustained an injury in a game against Everton in March 1961 from which he never fully recovered. He played his final game for Fulham against Manchester City in November 1962, and retired, aged 27, in 1964. He made a total of 88 appearances in the Football League.

He is the grandfather of Jack Lampe who signed for West Ham United in July 2009.
