= Martin Gorry =

English footballer (1954–2023)

Personal information
- Full name: Martin Christopher Gorry
- Date of birth: 29 December 1954
- Place of birth: Derby, England
- Date of death: 8 March 2023 (aged 68)
- Place of death: Rotorua, New Zealand
- Height: 5 ft 11 in (1.80 m)
- Position: Left back

Senior career*
Years	Team	Apps	(Gls)
1975–1977	Barnsley	34	(3)
1977–1978	Newcastle United	1	(0)
1978–1980	Hartlepool United	59	(0)
1980–1981	Shildon		
1981–1991	Rotorua City		
1991–??	Ngongotaha AFC		
- * Club domestic league appearances and goals

Martin Christopher Gorry (29 December 1954 – 8 March 2023) was an English professional footballer who played as a left-back for Barnsley, Newcastle United, Hartlepool United, Shildon, Rotorua City and Ngongotaha AFC.

== Playing career ==
Gorry began his playing career at Barnsley in 1975. Gorry spent two years with the club playing 34 times.

In 1977, Gorry signed for Newcastle United for a fee of £50,000. He was seen as a big prospect but played only once, coming on as a substitute against Manchester City on Boxing Day.

Gorry left Newcastle after one season but remained in the North-East signing for Hartlepool United on a free transfer. Gorry would have better luck at Pools as he won the Player of the Year award in 1979. Gorry made 59 league appearances for Hartlepool and played eight times in cup competitions across two seasons.

After leaving Hartlepool in 1980, Gorry played part-time for Shildon.

In 1981, he emigrated to New Zealand where he played for Rotorua City. Gorry made over 200 appearances for Rotorua. He left the club in 1991 to sign for Ngongotaha AFC.

== Death ==
Gorry died in Rotorua, New Zealand on 8 March 2023, at the age of 68.
