= John Geggus =

English footballer

Personal information
- Date of birth: 26 November 1889
- Place of birth: West Ham, England
- Date of death: 2 December 1951 (aged 62)
- Place of death: Greenwich, England
- Position: Goalkeeper

Senior career*
Years	Team	Apps	(Gls)
- Custom House
1910–1912	West Ham United	31	(0)
- Gravesend United
- * Club domestic league appearances and goals

John Geggus (26 November 1889 — 2 December 1951) was a footballer who played as goalkeeper for Custom House, West Ham United and Gravesend United.

== Club career ==
Geggus played 31 times for West Ham United in the Southern League, keeping nine clean sheets in total. Geggus' departure from West Ham was marred by his refusal to continue the game against Leyton on 9 April 1912 after being on the receiving end of disparaging comments from the West Ham support. Geggus' place was taken by Joseph Hughes and Geggus played only once more for West Ham.

== Personal life ==
Geggus is the paternal grandfather of Cockney Rejects vocalist Jeff Turner.
