= Kevin Thomas (footballer, born 1944) =

English footballer (1944–2022)

Personal information
- Full name: Kevin Anthony Thomas
- Date of birth: 13 August 1944
- Place of birth: Prescot, England
- Date of death: 9 October 2022 (aged 78)
- Place of death: Blackpool, England
- Position: Goalkeeper

Youth career
- Prescot Cables

Senior career*
Years	Team	Apps	(Gls)
1966–1969	Blackpool	12	(0)
1969–1971	Tranmere Rovers	18	(0)
1972–1973	Oxford United	5	(0)
1974–1976	Southport	67	(0)
- Barrow
Total		102	(0)
- * Club domestic league appearances and goals

Kevin Anthony Thomas (13 August 1944 – 9 October 2022) was an English footballer who played as a goalkeeper in the Football League for Blackpool, Tranmere Rovers, Oxford United and Southport. Thomas died from a stroke on 9 October 2022 at Trinity Hospice, Blackpool, at the age of 78.
