= Sammy Winston =

English footballer (1978–2023)

Personal information
- Full name: Samuel Winston
- Date of birth: 6 August 1978
- Place of birth: Islington, London, England
- Date of death: 27 February 2023 (aged 44)
- Position: Forward

Senior career*
Years	Team	Apps	(Gls)
1995–1996	Norwich City	0	(0)
1996–1997	Leyton Orient	11	(1)
1997–1998	Yeovil Town		(6)
1998–1999	Chesham United		
1999–2000	Sutton United	38	(8)
2000–2001	Kingstonian	34	(4)
2001–2003	Slough Town		
2003-2004	Boreham Wood		
2004–2005	East Thurrock United		
-2007	Harlow Town		
- → Uxbridge (loan)
- Leyton
2008–2009	Potters Bar Town		
- Enfield Town
- * Club domestic league appearances and goals

Samuel Winston (6 August 1978 – 27 February 2023) was an English footballer who played as a forward.

== Career ==
After helping Tottenham Hotspur reach the final of the FA Youth Cup, Winston signed for Norwich City to get more game time, but failed to make an appearance there.

In 1996, he signed for Leyton Orient in the fourth division, making 11 league appearances before joining fifth division side Yeovil Town.

In 2000, he signed for Kingstonian, another fifth division club, but left at the end of 2000–01 due to financial problems and relegation to the sixth division. From there, he moved to Slough Town F.C.

== Death ==
Winston died on 27 February 2023, at the age of 44. No cause of death was reported at the time, however the family disclosed Winston was struggling with his mental health at the time of his unexpected death.
