= 2023–24 UEFA Youth League group stage =

Football tournament group stage

The 2023–24 UEFA Youth League UEFA Champions League Path (group stage) began on 19 September and concluded on 13 December 2023. A total of 32 teams competed in the group stage of the UEFA Champions League Path to decide 16 of the 24 places in the knockout phase (play-offs and the round of 16 onwards) of the 2023–24 UEFA Youth League.

== Draw ==
The youth teams of the 32 clubs which qualified for the 2023–24 UEFA Champions League group stage entered the UEFA Champions League Path. If there was a vacancy (youth teams not entering), it was filled by a team defined by UEFA.

For the UEFA Champions League Path, the 32 teams were drawn into eight groups of four. There was no separate draw held, with the group compositions identical to the draw for the 2023–24 Champions League group stage, which was held on 31 August 2023.

Key to colours
Group winners advanced to round of 16
Group runners-up advanced to play-offs

| Pot 1 Team (The Football Association) Manchester City (Royal Spanish Football Federation) Sevilla (Royal Spanish Football Federation) Barcelona (Italian Football Federation) Napoli (German Football Association) Bayern Munich (French Football Federation) Paris Saint-Germain (Portuguese Football Federation) Benfica (Royal Dutch Football Association) Feyenoord | Pot 2 Team (Royal Spanish Football Federation) Real Madrid (The Football Association) Manchester United (Italian Football Federation) Inter Milan (German Football Association) Borussia Dortmund (Royal Spanish Football Federation) Atlético Madrid (German Football Association) RB Leipzig (Portuguese Football Federation) Porto (The Football Association) Arsenal | Pot 3 Team (Ukrainian Association of Football) Shakhtar Donetsk (Austrian Football Association) Red Bull Salzburg (Italian Football Federation) Milan (Portuguese Football Federation) Braga (Royal Dutch Football Association) PSV Eindhoven (Italian Football Federation) Lazio (Football Association of Serbia) Red Star Belgrade (Danish Football Association) Copenhagen | Pot 4 Team (Swiss Football Association) Young Boys (Royal Spanish Football Federation) Real Sociedad (Turkish Football Federation) Galatasaray (Scottish Football Association) Celtic (The Football Association) Newcastle United (German Football Association) Union Berlin (Royal Belgian Football Association) Antwerp (French Football Federation) Lens |

== Format ==
In each group, teams played against each other home-and-away in a round-robin format. The group winners advanced to the round of 16. The group runners-up would face the winners of the domestic champions path second round in the knockout round play-offs, while the third and fourth-placed teams were eliminated from European competitions for the season.

=== Tiebreakers ===
Teams were ranked according to points (3 points for a win, 1 point for a draw, 0 points for a loss). If two or more teams were tied on points, the following tiebreaking criteria was applied, in the order given, to determine the rankings (see Article 14 Group formation and match system – UEFA Champions League path group stage, Regulations of the UEFA Youth League):

1. Points in head-to-head matches among the tied teams;
2. Goal difference in head-to-head matches among the tied teams;
3. Goals scored in head-to-head matches among the tied teams;
4. If more than two teams were tied, and after applying all head-to-head criteria above, a subset of teams were still tied, all head-to-head criteria above were reapplied exclusively to this subset of teams;
5. Goal difference in all group matches;
6. Goals scored in all group matches;
7. Away goals scored in all group matches;
8. Wins in all group matches;
9. Away wins in all group matches;
10. Disciplinary points (direct red card = 3 points; double yellow card = 3 points; single yellow card = 1 point);
11. Drawing of lots.

== Groups ==
Times are CET/CEST, (Note: CEST (UTC+2) for dates up to 29 October 2023 (matchdays 1–3), and CET (UTC+1) for dates thereafter (matchdays 4–6).) as listed by UEFA (local times, if different, are in parentheses).

=== Group A ===
| Pos | Team | Pld | W | D | L | GF | GA | GD | Pts | Qualification | CPH | BAY | GAL | MUN |
|---|---|---|---|---|---|---|---|---|---|---|---|---|---|---|
| 1 | (Danish Football Association) Copenhagen | 6 | 4 | 1 | 1 | 18 | 7 | +11 | 13 | Advance to round of 16 | — | 3–2 | 6–0 | 2–2 |
| 2 | (German Football Association) Bayern Munich | 6 | 4 | 0 | 2 | 11 | 7 | +4 | 12 | Advance to play-offs | 2–1 | — | 2–1 | 2–0 |
| 3 | (Turkish Football Federation) Galatasaray | 6 | 2 | 0 | 4 | 5 | 17 | −12 | 6 | | 1–5 | 2–1 | — | 1–0 |
| 4 | (The Football Association) Manchester United | 6 | 1 | 1 | 4 | 5 | 8 | −3 | 4 | | 0–1 | 0–2 | 3–0 | — |

Source: UEFA
Rules for classification: Tiebreakers
20 September 2023
11:00 (12:00 UTC+3)

| Galatasaray (Turkish Football Federation) | 1–5 | (Danish Football Association) Copenhagen |
|---|---|---|
| Kasal 46' | Report | Chiakha 19', 61'; E. Højlund 37'; Sahsah 38'; Szücs 90+5' |

Recep Tayyip Erdoğan Stadium, Istanbul
Attendance: 650
Referee: Snir Levy (Israel)
20 September 2023
14:00

| Bayern Munich (German Football Association) | 2–0 | (The Football Association) Manchester United |
|---|---|---|
| Ramsak 40'; Scott 80' | Report |

FC Bayern Campus, Munich
Attendance: 500
Referee: Lothar D'hondt (Belgium)

3 October 2023
15:00 (14:00 UTC+1)

| Manchester United (The Football Association) | 3–0 | (Turkish Football Federation) Galatasaray |
|---|---|---|
| Forson 66' (pen.), 87'; Williams 75' | Report |

Leigh Sports Village, Leigh
Attendance: 523
Referee: Sivert Øksnes Amland (Norway)
3 October 2023
16:00

| Copenhagen (Danish Football Association) | 3–2 | (German Football Association) Bayern Munich |
|---|---|---|
| E. Højlund 38'; Sahsah 49', 90+4' | Report | Fernández 85'; Kouam 90+3' |

Tingbjerg Idrætspark, Copenhagen
Attendance: 924
Referee: Tom Owen (Wales)

24 October 2023
11:00 (12:00 UTC+3)

| Galatasaray (Turkish Football Federation) | 2–1 | (German Football Association) Bayern Munich |
|---|---|---|
| H. Akman 3' (pen.); Dilek 25' | Report | Aznou 28' |

Recep Tayyip Erdoğan Stadium, Istanbul
Attendance: 660
Referee: David Šmajc (Slovenia)
24 October 2023
15:00 (14:00 UTC+1)

| Manchester United (The Football Association) | 0–1 | (Danish Football Association) Copenhagen |
|---|---|---|
| | Report | Tchichamboud 84' |

Leigh Sports Village, Leigh
Attendance: 1,627
Referee: Rob Hennessy (Republic of Ireland)

8 November 2023
16:00

| Bayern Munich (German Football Association) | 2–1 | (Turkish Football Federation) Galatasaray |
|---|---|---|
| Pisano 33'; Demircan 90+4' | Report | H. Akman 56' |

FC Bayern Campus, Munich
Attendance: 700
Referee: Adam Ladebäck (Sweden)
8 November 2023
16:00

| Copenhagen (Danish Football Association) | 2–2 | (The Football Association) Manchester United |
|---|---|---|
| E. Højlund 23' (pen.); Chiakha 90' | Report | Williams 11'; Wheatley 13' |

Tingbjerg Idrætspark, Copenhagen
Attendance: 1,476
Referee: Damian Sylwestrzak (Poland)

29 November 2023
11:00 (13:00 UTC+3)

| Galatasaray (Turkish Football Federation) | 1–0 | (The Football Association) Manchester United |
|---|---|---|
| Demiroğlu 11' | Report |

Recep Tayyip Erdoğan Stadium, Istanbul
Attendance: 650
Referee: Robert Ian Jenkins (Wales)
29 November 2023
16:00

| Bayern Munich (German Football Association) | 2–1 | (Danish Football Association) Copenhagen |
|---|---|---|
| Demircan 70', 74' | Report | Chiakha 47' |

FC Bayern Campus, Munich
Attendance: 550
Referee: Elchin Masiyev (Azerbaijan)

12 December 2023
15:00 (14:00 UTC+0)

| Manchester United (The Football Association) | 0–2 | (German Football Association) Bayern Munich |
|---|---|---|
| | Report | Fernández 25'; Scott 79' |

Leigh Sports Village, Leigh
Attendance: 1,452
Referee: Vassilis Fotias (Greece)
12 December 2023
16:00

| Copenhagen (Danish Football Association) | 6–0 | (Turkish Football Federation) Galatasaray |
|---|---|---|
| Bidstrup 30'; Tchicamboud 33', 41'; Chiakha 53'; Németh 58'; Risnæs 77' | Report |

Tingbjerg Idrætspark, Copenhagen
Attendance: 1,163
Referee: Jovan Kachevski (North Macedonia)

=== Group B ===
| Pos | Team | Pld | W | D | L | GF | GA | GD | Pts | Qualification | LEN | SEV | PSV | ARS |
|---|---|---|---|---|---|---|---|---|---|---|---|---|---|---|
| 1 | (French Football Federation) Lens | 6 | 4 | 1 | 1 | 7 | 4 | +3 | 13 | Advance to round of 16 | — | 1–1 | 2–1 | 1–0 |
| 2 | (Royal Spanish Football Federation) Sevilla | 6 | 2 | 3 | 1 | 6 | 5 | +1 | 9 | Advance to play-offs | 0–1 | — | 1–0 | 2–1 |
| 3 | (Royal Dutch Football Association) PSV Eindhoven | 6 | 2 | 1 | 3 | 7 | 8 | −1 | 7 | | 2–0 | 1–1 | — | 1–3 |
| 4 | (The Football Association) Arsenal | 6 | 1 | 1 | 4 | 6 | 9 | −3 | 4 | | 0–2 | 1–1 | 1–2 | — |

Source: UEFA
Rules for classification: Tiebreakers
20 September 2023
14:00 (13:00 UTC+1)

| Arsenal (The Football Association) | 1–2 | (Royal Dutch Football Association) PSV Eindhoven |
|---|---|---|
| Nwaneri 31' | Report | Walters 42' (o.g.); Van Duiven 70' |

Meadow Park, Borehamwood
Attendance: 450
Referee: Andreas Argyrou (Cyprus)
20 September 2023
14:00

| Sevilla (Royal Spanish Football Federation) | 0–1 | (French Football Federation) Lens |
|---|---|---|
| | Report | Herbin 5' |

Estadio Jesús Navas, Seville
Attendance: 235
Referee: Gustavo Correia (Portugal)

3 October 2023
14:00

| Lens (French Football Federation) | 1–0 | (The Football Association) Arsenal |
|---|---|---|
| Sishuba 45+4' (pen.) | Report |

La Gaillette, Avion
Attendance: 2,000
Referee: Jasper Vergoote (Belgium)
3 October 2023
16:00

| PSV Eindhoven (Royal Dutch Football Association) | 1–1 | (Royal Spanish Football Federation) Sevilla |
|---|---|---|
| Van Duiven 61' (pen.) | Report | Van den Heuvel 40' (o.g.) |

De Herdgang, Eindhoven
Attendance: 1,200
Referee: Goga Kikacheishvili (Georgia)

24 October 2023
14:00

| Sevilla (Royal Spanish Football Federation) | 2–1 | (The Football Association) Arsenal |
|---|---|---|
| Collado 12'; López 38' | Report | Sagoe 83' |

Estadio Jesús Navas, Seville
Attendance: 360
Referee: Miloš Gigovic (Bosnia and Herzegovina)
24 October 2023
14:00

| Lens (French Football Federation) | 2–1 | (Royal Dutch Football Association) PSV Eindhoven |
|---|---|---|
| Sishuba 7'; Bermont 86' | Report | Abed 30' |

La Gaillette, Avion
Attendance: 3,750
Referee: Mikkel Redder (Denmark)

8 November 2023
14:00 (13:00 UTC+0)

| Arsenal (The Football Association) | 1–1 | (Royal Spanish Football Federation) Sevilla |
|---|---|---|
| Walters 61' | Report | Nacho 13' |

Meadow Park, Borehamwood
Attendance: 233
Referee: Iuliana Demetrescu (Romania)
8 November 2023
14:00

| PSV Eindhoven (Royal Dutch Football Association) | 2–0 | (French Football Federation) Lens |
|---|---|---|
| Bars 15'; Uneken 44' | Report |

De Herdgang, Eindhoven
Attendance: 1,200
Referee: Ivana Projkovska (North Macedonia)

29 November 2023
14:00

| Sevilla (Royal Spanish Football Federation) | 1–0 | (Royal Dutch Football Association) PSV Eindhoven |
|---|---|---|
| Sow 17' | Report |

Estadio Jesús Navas, Seville
Attendance: 244
Referee: Martin Dohál (Slovakia)
29 November 2023
14:00 (13:00 UTC+0)

| Arsenal (The Football Association) | 0–2 | (French Football Federation) Lens |
|---|---|---|
| | Report | Fofana 69'; Lenne 90' |

Meadow Park, Borehamwood
Attendance: 293
Referee: Helgi Mikael Jónasson (Iceland)

12 December 2023
13:00

| Lens (French Football Federation) | 1–1 | (Royal Spanish Football Federation) Sevilla |
|---|---|---|
| Fofana 23' | Report | Martínez 68' |

La Gaillette, Avion
Attendance: 2,095
Referee: Matthew De Gabriele (Malta)
12 December 2023
14:00

| PSV Eindhoven (Royal Dutch Football Association) | 1–3 | (The Football Association) Arsenal |
|---|---|---|
| Uneken 32' | Report | Cozier-Duberry 5', 68'; Nichols 80' |

De Herdgang, Eindhoven
Attendance: 800
Referee: Ante Čulina (Croatia)

=== Group C ===
| Pos | Team | Pld | W | D | L | GF | GA | GD | Pts | Qualification | RMA | BRA | NAP | UNB |
|---|---|---|---|---|---|---|---|---|---|---|---|---|---|---|
| 1 | (Royal Spanish Football Federation) Real Madrid | 6 | 4 | 2 | 0 | 14 | 1 | +13 | 14 | Advance to round of 16 | — | 0–0 | 6–0 | 2–1 |
| 2 | (Portuguese Football Federation) Braga | 6 | 3 | 3 | 0 | 8 | 3 | +5 | 12 | Advance to play-offs | 0–0 | — | 1–0 | 1–0 |
| 3 | (Italian Football Federation) Napoli | 6 | 1 | 1 | 4 | 4 | 17 | −13 | 4 | | 0–4 | 2–2 | — | 1–0 |
| 4 | (German Football Association) Union Berlin | 6 | 1 | 0 | 5 | 6 | 11 | −5 | 3 | | 0–2 | 1–4 | 4–1 | — |

Source: UEFA
Rules for classification: Tiebreakers
20 September 2023
14:00

| Real Madrid (Royal Spanish Football Federation) | 2–1 | (German Football Association) Union Berlin |
|---|---|---|
| De Llanos 55'; Palacios 76' | Report | Friedrich 43' |

Alfredo Di Stéfano Stadium, Madrid
Attendance: 425
Referee: Mohammad Al-Emara (Finland)
20 September 2023
15:00 (14:00 UTC+1)

| Braga (Portuguese Football Federation) | 1–0 | (Italian Football Federation) Napoli |
|---|---|---|
| Noro 10' | Report |

Cidade Desportiva do SC Braga, Braga
Attendance: 624
Referee: Amine Kourgheli (Belarus)

3 October 2023
13:00

| Union Berlin (German Football Association) | 1–4 | (Portuguese Football Federation) Braga |
|---|---|---|
| Kramer 10' | Report | Kelvin 16'; Fernandes 37'; Gonçalves 44', 50' |

Stadion An der Alten Försterei, Berlin
Attendance: 3,150
Referee: Kyriakos Athanasiou (Cyprus)
3 October 2023
14:00

| Napoli (Italian Football Federation) | 0–4 | (Royal Spanish Football Federation) Real Madrid |
|---|---|---|
| | Report | Gonzalo 21' (pen.), 62'; Ángel 37'; De Llanos 40' |

Stadio Comunale Arena Giuseppe Piccolo, Cercola
Attendance: 673
Referee: Jakob A. Sundberg (Denmark)

24 October 2023
15:00

| Union Berlin (German Football Association) | 4–1 | (Italian Football Federation) Napoli |
|---|---|---|
| Schleinitz 8'; Friedrich 59'; Engelbreth 64'; Asanji 90+4' | Report | Raggioli 1' |

Stadion An der Alten Försterei, Berlin
Attendance: 1,813
Referee: Jan Petřík (Czech Republic)
24 October 2023
16:00 (15:00 UTC+1)

| Braga (Portuguese Football Federation) | 0–0 | (Royal Spanish Football Federation) Real Madrid |
|---|---|---|
| | Report |

Cidade Desportiva do SC Braga, Braga
Attendance: 579
Referee: Joey Kooij (Netherlands)

8 November 2023
11:00

| Napoli (Italian Football Federation) | 1–0 | (German Football Association) Union Berlin |
|---|---|---|
| Lorusso 13' (pen.) | Report |

Stadio Comunale Arena Giuseppe Piccolo, Cercola
Attendance: 229
Referee: Jasmin Sabotic (Luxembourg)
8 November 2023
16:00

| Real Madrid (Royal Spanish Football Federation) | 0–0 | (Portuguese Football Federation) Braga |
|---|---|---|
| | Report |

Alfredo Di Stéfano Stadium, Madrid
Attendance: 760
Referee: Ivana Martinčić (Croatia)

29 November 2023
15:00 (14:00 UTC+0)

| Braga (Portuguese Football Federation) | 1–0 | (German Football Association) Union Berlin |
|---|---|---|
| Gonçalves 31' | Report |

Cidade Desportiva do SC Braga, Braga
Attendance: 459
Referee: Henrik Nalbandyan (Armenia)
29 November 2023
16:00

| Real Madrid (Royal Spanish Football Federation) | 6–0 | (Italian Football Federation) Napoli |
|---|---|---|
| De Llanos 4', 64'; Palacios 45+1'; Bravo 67'; Yáñez 90+2'; Chema 90+4' | Report |

Alfredo Di Stéfano Stadium, Madrid
Attendance: 766
Referee: Sander van der Eijk (Netherlands)

12 December 2023
13:00

| Union Berlin (German Football Association) | 0–2 | (Royal Spanish Football Federation) Real Madrid |
|---|---|---|
| | Report | Bravo 4', 61' |

Stadion An der Alten Försterei, Berlin
Attendance: 20,744
Referee: Joonas Jaanovits (Estonia)
12 December 2023
16:00

| Napoli (Italian Football Federation) | 2–2 | (Portuguese Football Federation) Braga |
|---|---|---|
| Borriello 46'; Ballabile 73' | Report | Gonçalves 40'; Furtado 63' |

Stadio Comunale Arena Giuseppe Piccolo, Cercola
Attendance: 185
Referee: Igor Stojchevski (North Macedonia)

=== Group D ===
| Pos | Team | Pld | W | D | L | GF | GA | GD | Pts | Qualification | SAL | INT | BEN | RSO |
|---|---|---|---|---|---|---|---|---|---|---|---|---|---|---|
| 1 | (Austrian Football Association) Red Bull Salzburg | 6 | 4 | 2 | 0 | 16 | 8 | +8 | 14 | Advance to round of 16 | — | 1–1 | 4–2 | 5–2 |
| 2 | (Italian Football Federation) Inter Milan | 6 | 1 | 4 | 1 | 9 | 9 | 0 | 7 | Advance to play-offs | 2–3 | — | 1–1 | 1–0 |
| 3 | (Portuguese Football Federation) Benfica | 6 | 1 | 3 | 2 | 8 | 10 | −2 | 6 | | 1–1 | 1–1 | — | 2–1 |
| 4 | (Royal Spanish Football Federation) Real Sociedad | 6 | 1 | 1 | 4 | 8 | 14 | −6 | 4 | | 0–2 | 3–3 | 2–1 | — |

Source: UEFA
Rules for classification: Tiebreakers
20 September 2023
12:00

| Real Sociedad (Royal Spanish Football Federation) | 3–3 | (Italian Football Federation) Inter Milan |
|---|---|---|
| Orobengoa 11'; Martín 53', 90' | Report | Sarr 5' (pen.); Kamate 7'; Matjaž 64' |

Zubieta, San Sebastián
Attendance: 1,224
Referee: Henrik Nalbandyan (Armenia)
20 September 2023
14:00 (13:00 UTC+1)

| Benfica (Portuguese Football Federation) | 1–1 | (Austrian Football Association) Red Bull Salzburg |
|---|---|---|
| Veloso 82' | Report | Paumgartner 87' |

Benfica Campus, Seixal
Attendance: 509
Referee: Viktor Kopiievskyi (Ukraine)

3 October 2023
12:00

| Inter Milan (Italian Football Federation) | 1–1 | (Portuguese Football Federation) Benfica |
|---|---|---|
| Berenbruch 11' | Report | João Rego 82' |

Suning Youth Development Centre, Milan
Attendance: 352
Referee: Robert Ian Jenkins (Wales)
3 October 2023
14:00

| Red Bull Salzburg (Austrian Football Association) | 5–2 | (Royal Spanish Football Federation) Real Sociedad |
|---|---|---|
| Daghim 12', 61'; Neumann 53'; Lukić 65' (pen.); Crescenti 72' | Report | Mariezkurrena 26'; Ramirez 56' |

Red Bull Akademie, Salzburg
Attendance: 425
Referee: Radoslav Gidzhenov (Bulgaria)

24 October 2023
14:00

| Inter Milan (Italian Football Federation) | 2–3 | (Austrian Football Association) Red Bull Salzburg |
|---|---|---|
| Vedovati 74'; Spinacce 90+6' | Report | Daghim 26'; Zeteny 40'; Atiabou 90+4' |

Suning Youth Development Centre, Milan
Attendance: 475
Referee: Edgars Maļcevs (Latvia)
24 October 2023
16:00 (15:00 UTC+1)

| Benfica (Portuguese Football Federation) | 2–1 | (Royal Spanish Football Federation) Real Sociedad |
|---|---|---|
| Silva 25'; Rafael Luís 79' | Report | Arruti 20' |

Benfica Campus, Seixal
Attendance: 592
Referee: Miloš Bošković (Montenegro)

8 November 2023
12:00

| Real Sociedad (Royal Spanish Football Federation) | 2–1 | (Portuguese Football Federation) Benfica |
|---|---|---|
| Arenzana 5'; Otadui 79' | Report | João Rego 42' |

Zubieta, San Sebastián
Attendance: 1,010
Referee: Jasper Vergoote (Belgium)
8 November 2023
14:30

| Red Bull Salzburg (Austrian Football Association) | 1–1 | (Italian Football Federation) Inter Milan |
|---|---|---|
| Sadeqi 76' | Report | Berenbruch 81' |

Red Bull Akademie, Salzburg
Attendance: 425
Referee: Miloš Milanović (Serbia)

29 November 2023
12:00

| Real Sociedad (Royal Spanish Football Federation) | 0–2 | (Austrian Football Association) Red Bull Salzburg |
|---|---|---|
| | Report | Sulzbacher 40'; Zeteny 45' |

Zubieta, San Sebastián
Attendance: 715
Referee: Lothar D'hondt (Belgium)
29 November 2023
16:00 (15:00 UTC+0)

| Benfica (Portuguese Football Federation) | 1–1 | (Italian Football Federation) Inter Milan |
|---|---|---|
| Nuno Félix 51' | Report | Quieto 49' |

Benfica Campus, Seixal
Attendance: 542
Referee: Andreas Argyrou (Cyprus)

12 December 2023
12:00

| Inter Milan (Italian Football Federation) | 1–0 | (Royal Spanish Football Federation) Real Sociedad |
|---|---|---|
| Sarr 64' (pen.) | Report |

Suning Youth Development Centre, Milan
Attendance: 278
Referee: Antoni Bandić (Bosnia and Herzegovina)
12 December 2023
14:30

| Red Bull Salzburg (Austrian Football Association) | 4–2 | (Portuguese Football Federation) Benfica |
|---|---|---|
| Spencer 4' (o.g.); Daghim 13'; Verhounig 41' (pen.); Sulzbacher 82' | Report | Ivan Lima 22'; João Rêgo 71' |

Red Bull Akademie, Salzburg
Attendance: 250
Referee: Michal Ocenáš (Slovakia)

=== Group E ===
| Pos | Team | Pld | W | D | L | GF | GA | GD | Pts | Qualification | FEY | ATM | LAZ | CEL |
|---|---|---|---|---|---|---|---|---|---|---|---|---|---|---|
| 1 | (Royal Dutch Football Association) Feyenoord | 6 | 4 | 1 | 1 | 13 | 7 | +6 | 13 | Advance to round of 16 | — | 0–1 | 2–2 | 3–0 |
| 2 | (Royal Spanish Football Federation) Atlético Madrid | 6 | 4 | 0 | 2 | 10 | 3 | +7 | 12 | Advance to play-offs | 1–2 | — | 0–1 | 4–0 |
| 3 | (Italian Football Federation) Lazio | 6 | 1 | 2 | 3 | 5 | 10 | −5 | 5 | | 1–3 | 0–2 | — | 0–2 |
| 4 | (Scottish Football Association) Celtic | 6 | 1 | 1 | 4 | 5 | 13 | −8 | 4 | | 2–3 | 0–2 | 1–1 | — |

Source: UEFA
Rules for classification: Tiebreakers
19 September 2023
14:00

| Lazio (Italian Football Federation) | 0–2 | (Royal Spanish Football Federation) Atlético Madrid |
|---|---|---|
| | Report | Niño 51', 65' |

Fersini Stadium, Formello
Attendance: 250
Referee: Mikkel Redder (Denmark)
19 September 2023
15:00

| Feyenoord (Royal Dutch Football Association) | 3–0 | (Scottish Football Association) Celtic |
|---|---|---|
| Read 41'; Slory 47'; Milambo 57' | Report |

Sportcomplex Varkenoord, Rotterdam
Attendance: 1,739
Referee: Antoni Bandić (Bosnia and Herzegovina)

4 October 2023
14:00

| Atlético Madrid (Royal Spanish Football Federation) | 1–2 | (Royal Dutch Football Association) Feyenoord |
|---|---|---|
| Niño 43' (pen.) | Report | Milambo 68' (pen.); Slory 90' (pen.) |

Centro Deportivo Wanda Alcalá de Henares, Alcalá de Henares
Attendance: 435
Referee: Ante Čulina (Croatia)
4 October 2023
15:00 (14:00 UTC+1)

| Celtic (Scottish Football Association) | 1–1 | (Italian Football Federation) Lazio |
|---|---|---|
| Carse 90+2' (pen.) | Report | Fernandes 41' |

Lesser Hampden, Glasgow
Attendance: 381
Referee: Helgi Mikael Jónasson (Iceland)

25 October 2023
14:00

| Feyenoord (Royal Dutch Football Association) | 2–2 | (Italian Football Federation) Lazio |
|---|---|---|
| Giersthove 40'; Slory 55' | Report | Napolitano 72'; Bordon 86' |

Sportcomplex Varkenoord, Rotterdam
Attendance: 1,840
Referee: Joonas Jaanovits (Estonia)
25 October 2023
15:00 (14:00 UTC+1)

| Celtic (Scottish Football Association) | 0–2 | (Royal Spanish Football Federation) Atlético Madrid |
|---|---|---|
| | Report | Muñoz 38'; Belid 83' |

Lesser Hampden, Glasgow
Attendance: 416
Referee: Ondřej Berka (Czech Republic)

7 November 2023
14:00

| Lazio (Italian Football Federation) | 1–3 | (Royal Dutch Football Association) Feyenoord |
|---|---|---|
| Bordon 25' | Report | Sliti 10'; Groen 66'; Rust 90+3' |

Fersini Stadium, Formello
Attendance: 150
Referee: Miguel Nogueira (Portugal)
7 November 2023
16:00

| Atlético Madrid (Royal Spanish Football Federation) | 4–0 | (Scottish Football Association) Celtic |
|---|---|---|
| Belid 16', 26', 63'; Niño 61' | Report |

Centro Deportivo Wanda Alcalá de Henares, Alcalá de Henares
Attendance: 438
Referee: Amine Kourgheli (Belarus)

28 November 2023
14:00

| Lazio (Italian Football Federation) | 0–2 | (Scottish Football Association) Celtic |
|---|---|---|
| | Report | Kelly 13'; Davidson 72' |

Fersini Stadium, Formello
Attendance: 118
Referee: Antoine Chiaramonti (Andorra)
28 November 2023
14:00

| Feyenoord (Royal Dutch Football Association) | 0–1 | (Royal Spanish Football Federation) Atlético Madrid |
|---|---|---|
| | Report | Luque 81' |

Sportcomplex Varkenoord, Rotterdam
Attendance: 1,500
Referee: Jasper Vergoote (Belgium)

13 December 2023
15:00 (14:00 UTC+0)

| Celtic (Scottish Football Association) | 2–3 | (Royal Dutch Football Association) Feyenoord |
|---|---|---|
| Dobbie 7'; Kelly 32' | Report | Sliti 68'; Kraaijeveld 90'; Groen 90+6' |

Lesser Hampden, Glasgow
Attendance: 502
Referee: Mohammad Usman Aslam (Norway)
13 December 2023
16:00

| Atlético Madrid (Royal Spanish Football Federation) | 0–1 | (Italian Football Federation) Lazio |
|---|---|---|
| | Report | Bigotti 15' |

Centro Deportivo Wanda Alcalá de Henares, Alcalá de Henares
Attendance: 359
Referee: Miloš Milanović (Serbia)

=== Group F ===
| Pos | Team | Pld | W | D | L | GF | GA | GD | Pts | Qualification | MIL | DOR | NEW | PAR |
|---|---|---|---|---|---|---|---|---|---|---|---|---|---|---|
| 1 | (Italian Football Federation) Milan | 6 | 4 | 0 | 2 | 14 | 8 | +6 | 12 | Advance to round of 16 | — | 4–1 | 4–0 | 3–2 |
| 2 | (German Football Association) Borussia Dortmund | 6 | 3 | 1 | 2 | 9 | 9 | 0 | 10 | Advance to play-offs | 1–2 | — | 2–2 | 2–0 |
| 3 | (The Football Association) Newcastle United | 6 | 2 | 1 | 3 | 8 | 11 | −3 | 7 | | 3–1 | 1–2 | — | 0–1 |
| 4 | (French Football Federation) Paris Saint-Germain | 6 | 2 | 0 | 4 | 5 | 8 | −3 | 6 | | 1–0 | 0–1 | 1–2 | — |

Source: UEFA
Rules for classification: Tiebreakers
19 September 2023
14:00

| Milan (Italian Football Federation) | 4–0 | (The Football Association) Newcastle United |
|---|---|---|
| Traorè 16'; Camarda 20' (pen.), 26'; Zeroli 75' (pen.) | Report |

Centro Sportivo Vismara, Milan
Attendance: 430
Referee: Stefan Ebner (Austria)
19 September 2023
15:00

| Paris Saint-Germain (French Football Federation) | 0–1 | (German Football Association) Borussia Dortmund |
|---|---|---|
| | Report | Rijkhoff 30' |

Stade Municipal Georges Lefèvre, Saint-Germain-en-Laye
Attendance: 400
Referee: Sander van der Eijk (Netherlands)

4 October 2023
14:00

| Borussia Dortmund (German Football Association) | 1–2 | (Italian Football Federation) Milan |
|---|---|---|
| Brunner 90+2' | Report | Sia 16'; Zeroli 22' |

Dortmund Brackel Training Ground, Dortmund
Attendance: 1,395
Referee: John Brooks (England)
4 October 2023
16:00 (15:00 UTC+1)

| Newcastle United (The Football Association) | 0–1 | (French Football Federation) Paris Saint-Germain |
|---|---|---|
| | Report | Ardjani 90+1' |

Gateshead International Stadium, Gateshead
Attendance: 467
Referee: Mohammad Usman Aslam (Norway)

25 October 2023
14:00

| Paris Saint-Germain (French Football Federation) | 1–0 | (Italian Football Federation) Milan |
|---|---|---|
| Mayulu 39' | Report |

Stade Municipal Georges Lefèvre, Saint-Germain-en-Laye
Attendance: 536
Referee: Alessandro Dudic (Switzerland)
25 October 2023
16:00 (15:00 UTC+1)

| Newcastle United (The Football Association) | 1–2 | (German Football Association) Borussia Dortmund |
|---|---|---|
| Neave 74' | Report | Rijkhoff 12'; Bamba 53' |

Gateshead International Stadium, Gateshead
Attendance: 726
Referee: Oliver Reitala (Finland)

7 November 2023
14:00

| Borussia Dortmund (German Football Association) | 2–2 | (The Football Association) Newcastle United |
|---|---|---|
| Campbell 10'; Rijkhoff 29' | Report | Heffernan 78'; Huntley 86' |

Dortmund Brackel Training Ground, Dortmund
Attendance: 942
Referee: Oleksiy Derevinskyi (Ukraine)
7 November 2023
14:00

| Milan (Italian Football Federation) | 3–2 | (French Football Federation) Paris Saint-Germain |
|---|---|---|
| Nsiala-Makengo 8'; Camarda 10'; Sia 90+4' | Report | Nhaga 45+2'; Adonis 66' |

Centro Sportivo Vismara, Milan
Attendance: 590
Referee: Miloš Savović (Montenegro)

28 November 2023
14:00

| Paris Saint-Germain (French Football Federation) | 1–2 | (The Football Association) Newcastle United |
|---|---|---|
| Sangaré 85' | Report | Bailey 11'; Emerson 88' |

Stade Municipal Georges Lefèvre, Saint-Germain-en-Laye
Attendance: 745
Referee: Bulat Sariyev (Kazakhstan)
28 November 2023
14:30

| Milan (Italian Football Federation) | 4–1 | (German Football Association) Borussia Dortmund |
|---|---|---|
| Zeroli 23'; Scotti 28', 31'; Sia 39' | Report | Rijkhoff 4' |

Centro Sportivo Vismara, Milan
Attendance: 600
Referee: David Dickinson (Scotland)

13 December 2023
14:00 (13:00 UTC+0)

| Newcastle United (The Football Association) | 3–1 | (Italian Football Federation) Milan |
|---|---|---|
| Hernes 51'; Heffernan 55'; Parkinson 73' | Report | Liberali 8' |

Whitley Park, Newcastle upon Tyne
Attendance: 383
Referee: Jan Petřík (Czech Republic)
13 December 2023
16:00

| Borussia Dortmund (German Football Association) | 2–0 | (French Football Federation) Paris Saint-Germain |
|---|---|---|
| Bamba 12'; Onofrietti 77' | Report |

Dortmund Brackel Training Ground, Dortmund
Attendance: 1,220
Referee: Genc Nuza (Kosovo)

=== Group G ===
| Pos | Team | Pld | W | D | L | GF | GA | GD | Pts | Qualification | MCI | RBL | RSB | YB |
|---|---|---|---|---|---|---|---|---|---|---|---|---|---|---|
| 1 | (The Football Association) Manchester City | 6 | 4 | 2 | 0 | 17 | 6 | +11 | 14 | Advance to round of 16 | — | 2–1 | 5–2 | 3–0 |
| 2 | (German Football Association) RB Leipzig | 6 | 3 | 2 | 1 | 8 | 5 | +3 | 11 | Advance to play-offs | 1–1 | — | 2–1 | 0–0 |
| 3 | (Football Association of Serbia) Red Star Belgrade | 6 | 1 | 1 | 4 | 8 | 13 | −5 | 4 (Note: Tied on head-to head record.) | | 2–2 | 0–1 | — | 2–1 |
| 4 | (Swiss Football Association) Young Boys | 6 | 1 | 1 | 4 | 4 | 13 | −9 | 4 | | 0–4 | 1–3 | 2–1 | — |

Source: UEFA
Rules for classification: Tiebreakers
Notes:
19 September 2023
14:30

| Young Boys (Swiss Football Association) | 1–3 | (German Football Association) RB Leipzig |
|---|---|---|
| Deme 40' | Report | Eduardo 35', 47' (pen.); Norbye 77' |

Arena Thun, Thun
Attendance: 279
Referee: Edgars Maļcevs (Latvia)
19 September 2023
16:00 (15:00 UTC+1)

| Manchester City (The Football Association) | 5–2 | (Football Association of Serbia) Red Star Belgrade |
|---|---|---|
| Lawrence 43', 47'; Dickson 50'; Taylor 55'; J. Heskey 81' | Report | Mijatović 57'; Bubanj 78' |

Academy Stadium, Manchester
Attendance: 350
Referee: Marek Radina (Czech Republic)

4 October 2023
14:00

| RB Leipzig (German Football Association) | 1–1 | (The Football Association) Manchester City |
|---|---|---|
| Eduardo 60' | Report | Lenz 71' (o.g.) |

Stadion am Cottaweg, Leipzig
Attendance: 953
Referee: Miguel Nogueira (Portugal)
4 October 2023
16:36 (Note: Match was originally scheduled for 16:00.)

| Red Star Belgrade (Football Association of Serbia) | 2–1 | (Swiss Football Association) Young Boys |
|---|---|---|
| Gojkov 73'; Mijatović 86' | Report | Parra 90' |

Voždovac Stadium, Belgrade
Attendance: 833
Referee: Dzmitry Dzmitryieu (Belarus)

25 October 2023
14:30

| Young Boys (Swiss Football Association) | 0–4 | (The Football Association) Manchester City |
|---|---|---|
| | Report | Taylor 18', 33'; Ademi 64' (o.g.); J. Heskey 69' |

Arena Thun, Thun
Attendance: 882
Referee: Daniyar Sakhi (Kazakhstan)
25 October 2023
15:30

| RB Leipzig (German Football Association) | 2–1 | (Football Association of Serbia) Red Star Belgrade |
|---|---|---|
| Schierack 82'; Šarić 87' | Report | Vukojević 47' |

Stadion am Cottaweg, Leipzig
Attendance: 543
Referee: Igor Stojchevski (North Macedonia)

7 November 2023
14:00 (13:00 UTC+0)

| Manchester City (The Football Association) | 3–0 | (Swiss Football Association) Young Boys |
|---|---|---|
| R. Heskey 9' (pen.); Susoho 36'; Henderson-Hall 44' | Report |

Academy Stadium, Manchester
Attendance: 564
Referee: Iwan Griffith (Wales)
7 November 2023
16:00

| Red Star Belgrade (Football Association of Serbia) | 0–1 | (German Football Association) RB Leipzig |
|---|---|---|
| | Report | Eduardo 73' |

Voždovac Stadium, Belgrade
Attendance: 856
Referee: Dominik Stary (Czech Republic)

28 November 2023
14:30

| Young Boys (Swiss Football Association) | 2–1 | (Football Association of Serbia) Red Star Belgrade |
|---|---|---|
| Parra 18'; Lüthi 71' | Report | Lečić 86' |

Arena Thun, Thun
Attendance: 307
Referee: Edgars Maļcevs (Latvia)
28 November 2023
16:00 (15:00 UTC+0)

| Manchester City (The Football Association) | 2–1 | (German Football Association) RB Leipzig |
|---|---|---|
| Taylor 63'; Adam 75' | Report | Eduardo 40' (pen.) |

Academy Stadium, Manchester
Attendance: 200
Referee: Alessandro Dudic (Switzerland)

13 December 2023
13:00

| RB Leipzig (German Football Association) | 0–0 | (Swiss Football Association) Young Boys |
|---|---|---|
| | Report |

Stadion am Cottaweg, Leipzig
Attendance: 511
Referee: Oliver Reitala (Finland)
13 December 2023
14:00

| Red Star Belgrade (Football Association of Serbia) | 2–2 | (The Football Association) Manchester City |
|---|---|---|
| Sljivić 20'; Maksimović 41' | Report | Muir 36'; Alfa-Ruprecht 76' |

Voždovac Stadium, Belgrade
Attendance: 548
Referee: Sayat Karabayev (Kazakhstan)

=== Group H ===
| Pos | Team | Pld | W | D | L | GF | GA | GD | Pts | Qualification | POR | BAR | SHK | ANT |
|---|---|---|---|---|---|---|---|---|---|---|---|---|---|---|
| 1 | (Portuguese Football Federation) Porto | 6 | 5 | 0 | 1 | 17 | 5 | +12 | 15 (Note: Head-to-head points: Porto 3, Barcelona 3. Head-to-head goal difference: Porto +2, Barcelona –2.) | Advance to round of 16 | — | 0–2 | 2–0 | 3–1 |
| 2 | (Royal Spanish Football Federation) Barcelona | 6 | 5 | 0 | 1 | 12 | 5 | +7 | 15 | Advance to play-offs | 0–4 | — | 2–0 | 2–1 |
| 3 | (Ukrainian Association of Football) Shakhtar Donetsk | 6 | 2 | 0 | 4 | 6 | 13 | −7 | 6 | | 1–4 | 0–3 | — | 3–1 |
| 4 | (Royal Belgian Football Association) Antwerp | 6 | 0 | 0 | 6 | 5 | 17 | −12 | 0 | | 1–4 | 0–3 | 1–2 | — |

Source: UEFA
Rules for classification: Tiebreakers
Notes:
19 September 2023
13:00

| Shakhtar Donetsk (Ukrainian Association of Football) | 1–4 | (Portuguese Football Federation) Porto |
|---|---|---|
| Pushkarov 90+3' | Report | Mora 7', 32'; Meireles 38' (pen.); Djaló 54' |

Edmund-Plambeck-Stadion, Norderstedt, Germany (Note: Due to the Russian invasion of Ukraine, Ukrainian teams were required to play their home matches at neutral venues until further notice.)
Attendance: 882
Referee: Jamie Robinson (Northern Ireland)
19 September 2023
16:00

| Barcelona (Royal Spanish Football Federation) | 2–1 | (Royal Belgian Football Association) Antwerp |
|---|---|---|
| Olmedo 22'; Rodríguez 29' | Report | Godelaine 73' |

Johan Cruyff Stadium, Sant Joan Despí
Attendance: 560
Referee: Ishmael Barbara (Malta)

4 October 2023
12:00

| Antwerp (Royal Belgian Football Association) | 1–2 | (Ukrainian Association of Football) Shakhtar Donetsk |
|---|---|---|
| Delaporte 14' | Report | Hlushchenko 18' (pen.); Demchenko 73' |

Herman Vanderpoortenstadion, Lier
Attendance: 320
Referee: Roman Jitari (Moldova)
4 October 2023
16:00 (15:00 UTC+1)

| Porto (Portuguese Football Federation) | 0–2 | (Royal Spanish Football Federation) Barcelona |
|---|---|---|
| | Report | Guiu 80'; Alarcón 87' |

Estádio Municipal Jorge Sampaio, Vila Nova de Gaia
Attendance: 910
Referee: Miloš Gigovic (Bosnia and Herzegovina)

25 October 2023
14:00

| Barcelona (Royal Spanish Football Federation) | 2–0 | (Ukrainian Association of Football) Shakhtar Donetsk |
|---|---|---|
| Darvich 15'; Hernández 85' | Report |

Johan Cruyff Stadium, Sant Joan Despí
Attendance: 652
Referee: Menelaos Antoniou (Cyprus)
25 October 2023
14:00

| Antwerp (Royal Belgian Football Association) | 1–4 | (Portuguese Football Federation) Porto |
|---|---|---|
| Vandeplas 90+4' | Report | Candé 6', 18'; Oliveira 67'; Martins 81' |

Herman Vanderpoortenstadion, Lier
Attendance: 796
Referee: Genc Nuza (Kosovo)

7 November 2023
12:00

| Shakhtar Donetsk (Ukrainian Association of Football) | 0–3 | (Royal Spanish Football Federation) Barcelona |
|---|---|---|
| | Report | Calderó 16'; Rodríguez 58'; Navarro 62' |

Edmund-Plambeck-Stadion, Norderstedt, Germany
Attendance: 1,415
Referee: Bulat Sariyev (Kazakhstan)
7 November 2023
15:30 (14:30 UTC+0)

| Porto (Portuguese Football Federation) | 3–1 | (Royal Belgian Football Association) Antwerp |
|---|---|---|
| Sousa 14'; Candé 20'; Mora 24' | Report | Vandeplas 79' |

Estádio Municipal Jorge Sampaio, Vila Nova de Gaia
Attendance: 407
Referee: Andreas Argyrou (Cyprus)

28 November 2023
12:00

| Shakhtar Donetsk (Ukrainian Association of Football) | 3–1 | (Royal Belgian Football Association) Antwerp |
|---|---|---|
| Yushchenko 7'; Elmazhad 69' (o.g.); Savin 83' | Report | Vandeplas 60' |

Edmund-Plambeck-Stadion, Norderstedt, Germany
Attendance: 753
Referee: Rob Hennessy (Republic of Ireland)
28 November 2023
16:00

| Barcelona (Royal Spanish Football Federation) | 0–4 | (Portuguese Football Federation) Porto |
|---|---|---|
| | Report | Mora 23'; Sousa 59'; Meireles 73'; Cande 79' |

Johan Cruyff Stadium, Sant Joan Despí
Attendance: 620
Referee: Roman Jitari (Moldova)

13 December 2023
14:00

| Antwerp (Royal Belgian Football Association) | 0–3 | (Royal Spanish Football Federation) Barcelona |
|---|---|---|
| | Report | Alba 17'; Rodríguez 25'; Hernández 90+4' |

Herman Vanderpoortenstadion, Lier
Attendance: 1,217
Referee: Ivo Torres (Luxembourg)
13 December 2023
15:30 (14:30 UTC+0)

| Porto (Portuguese Football Federation) | 2–0 | (Ukrainian Association of Football) Shakhtar Donetsk |
|---|---|---|
| Candé 47'; Mora 62' | Report |

Estádio Municipal Jorge Sampaio, Vila Nova de Gaia
Attendance: 509
Referee: Marek Radina (Czech Republic)
