= 2023–24 in Italian football =

Football in Italy
- Season: 2023–24

Men's football
- Serie A: Internazionale
- Serie B: Parma
- Serie C: Mantova (Group A); Cesena (Group B); Juve Stabia (Group C)
- Serie D: Campobasso
- Coppa Italia: Juventus
- Coppa Italia Serie C: Catania
- Supercoppa Italiana: Internazionale

Women's football
- Serie A: Roma
- Coppa Italia: Roma
- Supercoppa Italiana: Juventus

The 2023–24 season was the 122nd season of competitive football in Italy.

== National teams ==
=== Men ===
==== Italy national football team ====
===== Friendlies =====
21 March 2024	Venezuela	1–2	Italy	Fort Lauderdale, United States
22:00 EST (UTC−05:00)	Machís 43'	Report	Retegui 40', 80'	Stadium: Chase Stadium; Referee: Rubiel Vazquez (United States)

24 March 2024	Ecuador	0–2	Italy	Harrison, United States
22:00 EST (UTC−05:00)		Report	Pellegrini 3'; Barella 90+4'	Stadium: Red Bull Arena; Attendance: 18,000; Referee: Jon Freemon (United States)

4 June 2024	Italy	0–0	Turkey	Bologna, Italy
21:00 CEST (UTC+02:00)		Report		Stadium: Stadio Renato Dall'Ara; Attendance: 25,012; Referee: Sebastian Gishamer (Austria)

9 June 2024	Italy	1–0	Bosnia and Herzegovina	Empoli, Italy
20:45 CEST (UTC+02:00)	Frattesi 38'	Report		Stadium: Stadio Carlo Castellani; Attendance: 12,000; Referee: Chrysovalantis Theouli (Cyprus)

===== UEFA Euro 2024 qualifying =====
====== Group C ======
Pos	Team	Pld	W	D	L	GF	GA	GD	Pts	Qualification	(England)	(Italy)	(Ukraine)	(North Macedonia)	(Malta)
1	England	8	6	2	0	22	4	+18	20	Qualify for final tournament	—	3–1	2–0	7–0	2–0
2	Italy	8	4	2	2	16	9	+7	14 (Note: Head-to-head points: Italy 4, Ukraine 1.)	Qualify for final tournament	1–2	—	2–1	5–2	4–0
3	Ukraine	8	4	2	2	11	8	+3	14	Advance to play-offs via Nations League	1–1	0–0	—	2–0	1–0
4	North Macedonia	8	2	2	4	10	20	−10	8		1–1	1–1	2–3	—	2–1
5	Malta	8	0	0	8	2	20	−18	0		0–4	0–2	1–3	0–2	—

Source: UEFA
Rules for classification: Qualification tiebreakers
Notes:

9 September 2023	North Macedonia	1–1	Italy	Skopje, North Macedonia
20:45 CEST (UTC+02:00)	Bardhi 81'	Report	Immobile 47'	Stadium: Toše Proeski Arena; Attendance: 28,126; Referee: François Letexier (France)

12 September 2023	Italy	2–1	Ukraine	Milan, Italy
20:45 CEST (UTC+02:00)	Frattesi 12', 29'	Report	Yarmolenko 41'	Stadium: San Siro; Attendance: 58,386; Referee: Alejandro Hernández Hernández (Spain)

14 October 2023	Italy	4–0	Malta	Bari, Italy
20:45 CEST (UTC+02:00)	Bonaventura 23'; Berardi 45+1', 64'; Frattesi 90+3'	Report		Stadium: Stadio San Nicola; Attendance: 56,186; Referee: Duje Strukan (Croatia)

17 October 2023	England	3–1	Italy	London, England
20:45 CEST (UTC+02:00)	Kane 32' (pen.), 77'; Rashford 57'	Report	Scamacca 15'	Stadium: Wembley Stadium; Attendance: 83,194; Referee: Clément Turpin (France)

17 November 2023	Italy	5–2	North Macedonia	Rome, Italy
20:45 CET (UTC+01:00)	Darmian 17'; Chiesa 41', 45+2'; Raspadori 81'; El Shaarawy 90+3'	Report	Atanasov 52', 74'	Stadium: Stadio Olimpico; Attendance: 56,364; Referee: Felix Zwayer (Germany)

20 November 2023	Ukraine	0–0	Italy	Leverkusen, Germany (Note: Due to the Russian invasion of Ukraine, Ukraine are required to play their home matches at neutral venues until further notice.)
20:45 CET (UTC+01:00)		Report		Stadium: BayArena

===== UEFA Euro 2024 =====
====== Group B ======
Pos	Team	Pld	W	D	L	GF	GA	GD	Pts	Qualification
1	Spain	3	3	0	0	5	0	+5	9	Advance to knockout stage
2	Italy	3	1	1	1	3	3	0	4	Advance to knockout stage
3	Croatia	3	0	2	1	3	6	−3	2	
4	Albania	3	0	1	2	3	5	−2	1	

Source: UEFA

15 June 2024	Italy	2–1	Albania	Dortmund, Germany
	Bastoni 11'; Barella 16'	Report	Bajrami 1'	Stadium: Westfalenstadion; Attendance: 60,512; Referee: Felix Zwayer (Germany)

20 June 2024	Spain	1–0	Italy	Gelsenkirchen, Germany
	Calafiori 55' (o.g.)	Report		Stadium: Arena AufSchalke; Attendance: 49,528; Referee: Slavko Vinčić (Slovenia)

24 June 2024	Croatia	1–1	Italy	Leipzig, Germany
	Modrić 55'	Report	Zaccagni 90+8'	Stadium: Red Bull Arena; Attendance: 38,322; Referee: Danny Makkelie (Netherlands)

====== Knockout stage ======
29 June 2024 R16	Switzerland	2–0	Italy	Berlin, Germany
18:00	Freuler 37'; Vargas 46'	Report		Stadium: Olympiastadion; Attendance: 68,172; Referee: Szymon Marciniak (Poland)

=== Women ===
==== Italy women's national football team ====
===== Friendlies =====
1 July 2023	Italy	0–0	Morocco	Ferrara, Italy
				Stadium: Paolo Mazza stadium

14 July 2023	New Zealand	0–1	Italy

23 February 2024	Italy	0–0	Republic of Ireland	Florence, Italy
17:15 GMT				Stadium: Viola Park

27 February 2024	England	5–1	Italy	Algeciras, Spain
19:00				Stadium: Estadio Nuevo Mirador

===== 2023 FIFA Women's World Cup =====
====== 2023 FIFA Women's World Cup Group G ======
Pos	Team	Pld	W	D	L	GF	GA	GD	Pts	Qualification
1	Sweden	3	3	0	0	9	1	+8	9	Advance to knockout stage
2	South Africa	3	1	1	1	6	6	0	4	Advance to knockout stage
3	Italy	3	1	0	2	3	8	−5	3	
4	Argentina	3	0	1	2	2	5	−3	1	

Source: FIFA
Rules for classification: Group stage tiebreakers

24 July 2023	Italy	1–0	Argentina	Auckland, New Zealand
	Girelli 87'	Report		Stadium: Eden Park; Attendance: 30,889; Referee: Melissa Borjas (Honduras)

29 July 2023	Sweden	5–0	Italy	Wellington, New Zealand
	Ilestedt 39', 50'; Rolfö 44'; Blackstenius 45+1'; Blomqvist 90+6'	Report		Stadium: Wellington Regional Stadium; Attendance: 29,143; Referee: Cheryl Foster (Wales)

2 August 2023	South Africa	3–2	Italy	Wellington, New Zealand
	Orsi 32' (o.g.); Magaia 67'; Kgatlana 90+2'	Report	Caruso 11' (pen.), 74'	Stadium: Wellington Regional Stadium; Attendance: 14,967; Referee: María Carvajal (Chile)

===== UEFA Women's Nations League =====
====== 2023–24 UEFA Women's Nations League A Group A4 ======
Pos	Team	Pld	W	D	L	GF	GA	GD	Pts	Qualification or relegation	(Spain)	(Italy)	(Sweden)	(Switzerland)
1	Spain	6	5	0	1	23	9	+14	15	Qualification for Nations League Finals	—	2–3	5–3	5–0
2	Italy	6	3	1	2	8	5	+3	10		0–1	—	0–1	3–0
3	Sweden (O)	6	2	1	3	8	10	−2	7	Qualification for relegation play-offs	2–3	1–1	—	1–0
4	Switzerland (R)	6	1	0	5	2	17	−15	3	Relegation to League B	1–7	0–1	1–0	—

Source: UEFA
Rules for classification: Tiebreakers
(O) Play-off winners; (R) Relegated

22 September 2023	Switzerland	0–1	Italy	St. Gallen
		Report	Caruso 64'	Stadium: Kybunpark; Referee: Lina Lehtovaara (Finland)

26 September 2023	Italy	0–1	Sweden	Castel di Sangro
		Report	Kaneryd 15'	Stadium: Stadio Teofilo Patini; Referee: Ivana Projkovska (North Macedonia)

27 October 2023	Italy	0–1	Spain	Salerno
		Report	Hermoso 89'	Stadium: Stadio Arechi; Referee: Alina Peşu (Romania)

31 October 2023	Sweden	1–1	Italy	Malmö
	Sembrant 90+6'	Report	Giacinti 57'	Stadium: Eleda Stadion; Referee: Stéphanie Frappart (France)

1 December 2023	Spain	2–3	Italy	Pontevedra
		Report		Stadium: Estadio Municipal de Pasarón

5 December 2023	Italy	3–0	Switzerland	Parma
		Report		Stadium: Stadio Ennio Tardini

===== UEFA Women's Euro 2025 qualifying League A =====
Pos	Team	Pld	W	D	L	GF	GA	GD	Pts	Qualification	(Italy)	(Netherlands)	(Norway)	(Finland)
1	Italy	6	2	3	1	8	3	+5	9 (Note: Head-to-head points: Italy 4, Netherlands 1.)	Qualify for final tournament	—	2–0	1–1	4–0
2	Netherlands	6	2	3	1	4	4	0	9	Qualify for final tournament	0–0	—	1–0	1–0
3	Norway	6	1	4	1	7	4	+3	7	Advance to play-offs (seeded)	0–0	1–1	—	4–0
4	Finland (R)	6	1	2	3	4	12	−8	5	Advance to play-offs (seeded) and relegation to League B	2–1	1–1	1–1	—

Source: UEFA
Rules for classification: Tiebreakers
(R) Relegated
Notes:

5 April Euro 2025 qualifying	Italy	2–0	Netherlands	Cosenza
18:15		Report		Stadium: Stadio San Vito-Gigi Marulla; Referee: Ivana Martinčić (Croatia)

9 April Euro 2025 qualifying	Finland	2–1	Italy	Helsinki
18:15		Report		Stadium: Helsinki Football Stadium; Referee: Marta Huerta de Aza (Spain)

== League season ==
=== Men ===
==== Promotions and relegations (pre-season) ====
Teams promoted to Serie A

- Frosinone
- Genoa
- Cagliari

Teams relegated from Serie A

- Spezia
- Cremonese
- Sampdoria

Teams promoted to Serie B

- Feralpisalò (Group A)
- Reggiana (Group B)
- Catanzaro (Group C)

Teams relegated from Serie B

- Brescia
- Perugia
- SPAL
- Benevento

==== Serie A ====
Pos	Team	Pld	W	D	L	GF	GA	GD	Pts	Qualification or relegation
1	Inter Milan (C)	38	29	7	2	89	22	+67	94	Qualification for the Champions League league phase (Note: Serie A gained an additional Champions League place as a result of Italy finishing as one of the two associations with the highest coefficient points in 2023–24.)
2	Milan	38	22	9	7	76	49	+27	75	Qualification for the Champions League league phase
3	Juventus	38	19	14	5	54	31	+23	71	Qualification for the Champions League league phase
4	Atalanta	38	21	6	11	72	42	+30	69	Qualification for the Champions League league phase
5	Bologna	38	18	14	6	54	32	+22	68	Qualification for the Champions League league phase
6	Roma	38	18	9	11	65	46	+19	63	Qualification for the Europa League league phase (Note: Since the winners of the 2023–24 Coppa Italia, Juventus, qualified for the Champions League, the Europa League berth awarded to the Coppa Italia winners was passed to the seventh-placed team, and the Conference League berth was passed to the eighth-placed team.)
7	Lazio	38	18	7	13	49	39	+10	61	Qualification for the Europa League league phase
8	Fiorentina	38	17	9	12	61	46	+15	60	Qualification for the Conference League play-off round
9	Torino	38	13	14	11	36	36	0	53 (Note: Torino finished ahead of Napoli on head-to-head points: Torino 3–0 Napoli, Napoli 1–1 Torino.)	
10	Napoli	38	13	14	11	55	48	+7	53	
11	Genoa	38	12	13	13	45	45	0	49	
12	Monza	38	11	12	15	39	51	−12	45	
13	Hellas Verona	38	9	11	18	38	51	−13	38 (Note: Hellas Verona finished ahead of Lecce on head-to-head points: Hellas Verona 2–2 Lecce, Lecce 0–1 Hellas Verona.)	
14	Lecce	38	8	14	16	32	54	−22	38	
15	Udinese	38	6	19	13	37	53	−16	37	
16	Cagliari	38	8	12	18	42	68	−26	36 (Note: Cagliari finished ahead of Empoli on head-to-head points: Cagliari 0–0 Empoli, Empoli 0–1 Cagliari.)	
17	Empoli	38	9	9	20	29	54	−25	36	
18	Frosinone (R)	38	8	11	19	44	69	−25	35	Relegation to Serie B
19	Sassuolo (R)	38	7	9	22	43	75	−32	30	Relegation to Serie B
20	Salernitana (R)	38	2	11	25	32	81	−49	17	Relegation to Serie B

Source: Serie A
Rules for classification: 1) Points; 2) Tiebreaker for Champions team and third relegated team; 3) Head-to-head points; 4) Head-to-head goal difference; 5) Goal difference; 6) Goals scored; 7) Draw.
(Note: Head-to-head record is used only after all the matches between the teams in question have been played)
(C) Champions; (R) Relegated

==== Serie B ====
Pos	Team	Pld	W	D	L	GF	GA	GD	Pts	Promotion, qualification or relegation
1	Parma (C, P)	38	21	13	4	66	35	+31	76	Promotion to Serie A
2	Como (P)	38	21	10	7	58	40	+18	73	Promotion to Serie A
3	Venezia (O, P)	38	21	7	10	69	46	+23	70	Qualification for promotion play-offs semi-finals
4	Cremonese	38	19	10	9	50	32	+18	67	Qualification for promotion play-offs semi-finals
5	Catanzaro	38	17	9	12	59	50	+9	60	Qualification for promotion play-offs preliminary round
6	Palermo	38	15	11	12	62	53	+9	56	Qualification for promotion play-offs preliminary round
7	Sampdoria (Note: Sampdoria were deducted 2 points due to failure in paying taxes between January and March 2023.)	38	16	9	13	53	50	+3	55	Qualification for promotion play-offs preliminary round
8	Brescia	38	12	15	11	44	40	+4	51	Qualification for promotion play-offs preliminary round
9	Cosenza	38	11	14	13	47	42	+5	47 (Note: Head-to-head points: Cosenza 11, Modena 11, Reggiana 7, Südtirol 3. Head-to-head goal difference: Cosenza +6, Modena +2.)	
10	Modena	38	10	17	11	41	47	−6	47	
11	Reggiana	38	10	17	11	38	45	−7	47	
12	Südtirol	38	12	11	15	46	48	−2	47	
13	Pisa	38	11	13	14	51	54	−3	46 (Note: Pisa finished ahead of Cittadella on head-to-head points: Pisa 2–1 Cittadella, Cittadella 0–1 Pisa.)	
14	Cittadella	38	11	13	14	40	47	−7	46	
15	Spezia	38	9	17	12	36	49	−13	44	
16	Ternana (R)	38	11	10	17	43	50	−7	43	Qualification for relegation play-out
17	Bari (O)	38	8	17	13	38	49	−11	41 (Note: Bari finished ahead of Ascoli on head-to-head points: Bari 1–0 Ascoli, Ascoli 2–2 Bari.)	Qualification for relegation play-out
18	Ascoli (R)	38	9	14	15	38	42	−4	41	Relegation to Serie C
19	Feralpisalò (R)	38	8	9	21	44	65	−21	33	Relegation to Serie C
20	Lecco (R)	38	6	8	24	35	74	−39	26	Relegation to Serie C

Source: Soccerway (in English)
Rules for classification: 1) Points; 2) Head-to-head points; 3) Head-to-head goal difference; 4) Goal difference; 5) Goals scored; 6) Draw.
(Note: Head-to-head record is used only after all the matches between the teams in question have been played)
(C) Champions; (O) Play-off winners; (P) Promoted; (R) Relegated

==== Serie C ====
Group A (North)

Pos	Team	Pld	Pts
1	Mantova (P)	38	80
2	Padova	38	77
3	Vicenza	38	71
4	Triestina	38	64
5	Atalanta U23	38	59
6	Legnago	38	56
7	Giana Erminio	38	53
8	Pro Vercelli	38	53
9	Lumezzane	38	53
10	Trento	38	51
11	Virtus Verona	38	47
12	Pro Patria	38	46
13	AlbinoLeffe	38	45
14	Pergolettese	38	45
15	Renate	38	45
16	Arzignano	38	44
17	Novara (O)	38	43
18	Fiorenzuola (R)	38	38
19	Pro Sesto (R)	38	35
20	Alessandria (R)	38	20

Updated to match(es) played on 28 April 2024.
Source: Lega Pro, Soccerway (in English)
(O) Play-off winners;
(P) Promoted;
(R) Relegated
Group B (Centre)

Pos	Team	Pld	Pts
1	Cesena (C, P)	38	96
2	Torres	38	75
3	Carrarese (O, P)	38	73
4	Perugia	38	63
5	Gubbio	38	59
6	Pescara	38	55
7	Juventus Next Gen	38	54
8	Arezzo	38	53
9	Pontedera	38	52
10	Rimini	38	50
11	SPAL	38	49
12	Lucchese	38	45
13	Virtus Entella	38	45
14	Pineto	38	45
15	Sestri Levante	38	44
16	Ancona (E, R)	38	42
17	Vis Pesaro	38	39
18	Recanatese (R)	38	38
19	Fermana (R)	38	31
20	Olbia (R)	38	26

Updated to match(es) played on 28 April 2024.
Source: Lega Pro, Soccerway (in English)
(C) Champions;
(E) Eliminated;
(O) Play-off winners;
(P) Promoted;
(R) Relegated
Group C (South)

Pos	Team	Pld	Pts
1	Juve Stabia (P)	38	79
2	Avellino	38	69
3	Benevento	38	66
4	Casertana	38	65
5	Taranto	38	65
6	Picerno	38	58
7	Audace Cerignola	38	53
8	Giugliano	38	53
9	Crotone	38	52
10	Latina	38	51
11	Foggia	38	48
12	Sorrento	38	48
13	Catania	38	45
14	Messina	38	45
15	Turris	38	44
16	Potenza (O)	38	43
17	Monopoli (O)	38	42
18	Virtus Francavilla (R)	38	35
19	Monterosi (R)	38	35
20	Brindisi (R)	38	25

Updated to match(es) played on 27 April 2024.
Source: Lega Pro, Soccerway (in English)
(O) Play-off winners;
(P) Promoted;
(R) Relegated

=== Women ===
==== Serie A (women) ====
Pos	Team	Pld	W	D	L	GF	GA	GD	Pts	Qualification or relegation
1	Roma	18	17	0	1	51	11	+40	51	Qualification for the championship round
2	Juventus	18	14	1	3	47	16	+31	43	Qualification for the championship round
3	Fiorentina	18	12	3	3	36	19	+17	39	Qualification for the championship round
4	Sassuolo	18	8	2	8	20	20	0	26	Qualification for the championship round
5	Inter Milan	18	8	2	8	28	29	−1	26	Qualification for the championship round
6	AC Milan	18	5	6	7	22	22	0	21	Qualification for the relegation round
7	Como	18	6	3	9	20	33	−13	21	Qualification for the relegation round
8	Sampdoria	18	5	3	10	12	29	−17	18	Qualification for the relegation round
9	Napoli	18	1	3	14	11	36	−25	6	Qualification for the relegation round
10	Pomigliano	18	1	3	14	14	46	−32	6	Qualification for the relegation round

Source: FIGC
Rules for classification: 1) Points; 2) Head-to-head points; 3) Goal difference; 4) Number of goals scored; 5) Head-to-head goal difference; 6) Head-to-head away goals scored

Pos	Team	Pld	W	D	L	GF	GA	GD	Pts	Qualification or relegation
1	Roma (C)	26	23	1	2	74	24	+50	70	Qualification for the Champions League second round
2	Juventus	26	19	2	5	65	27	+38	59	Qualification for the Champions League second round
3	Fiorentina	26	12	6	8	42	40	+2	42	Qualification for the Champions League first round
4	Sassuolo	26	11	3	12	39	41	−2	36	
5	Inter Milan	26	10	4	12	45	46	−1	34	

Updated to match(es) played on 19 May 2024. Source: FIGC
Rules for classification: 1) Points; 2) Head-to-head points; 3) Goal difference; 4) Number of goals scored; 5) Head-to-head goal difference; 6) Head-to-head away goals scored
(C) Champions

Pos	Team	Pld	W	D	L	GF	GA	GD	Pts	Qualification or relegation
1	AC Milan	26	11	8	7	43	30	+13	41	
2	Como	26	9	5	12	30	43	−13	32	
3	Sampdoria	26	8	4	14	25	42	−17	28	
4	Napoli (O)	26	2	7	17	20	48	−28	13	Qualification for the relegation play-offs
5	Pomigliano (R)	26	2	6	18	23	65	−42	12	Relegation to Serie B

Updated to match(es) played on 19 May 2024. Source: FIGC
Rules for classification: 1) Points; 2) Head-to-head points; 3) Goal difference; 4) Number of goals scored; 5) Head-to-head goal difference; 6) Head-to-head away goals scored
(O) Play-off winners; (R) Relegated

== Cup competitions ==
=== Coppa Italia ===
==== Final ====
15 May 2024
21:00 CEST

Atalanta	0–1	Juventus
	Report	Vlahović 4'

Stadio Olimpico, Rome
Attendance: 66,854
Referee: Fabio Maresca
15 May 2024
21:00 CEST

v

Stadio Olimpico, Rome

=== Supercoppa Italiana ===
Semi-finals
18 January 2024 – Riyadh
Napoli	3
Fiorentina	0
19 January 2024 – Riyadh
Inter Milan	3
Lazio	0

Final
22 January 2024 – Riyadh
Napoli	0
Inter Milan	1

==== Final ====
22 January 2024
22:00

Napoli	0–1	Inter Milan
	Report	Martínez 90+1'

King Saud University Stadium, Riyadh
Attendance: 24,900
Referee: Antonio Rapuano

=== Coppa Italia (women) ===
==== Final ====
v

=== Supercoppa Italiana (women) ===
==== Final ====
7 January 2024

Roma	1–2	Juventus

Stadio Giovanni Zini, Cremona

== UEFA competitions ==
=== UEFA Champions League ===
==== Group stage ====
===== Group C =====
Pos	Team	Pld	W	D	L	GF	GA	GD	Pts	Qualification	RMA	NAP	BRA	UNB
1	(Spain) Real Madrid	6	6	0	0	16	7	+9	18	Advance to knockout phase	—	4–2	3–0	1–0
2	(Italy) Napoli	6	3	1	2	10	9	+1	10	Advance to knockout phase	2–3	—	2–0	1–1
3	(Portugal) Braga	6	1	1	4	6	12	−6	4	Transfer to Europa League	1–2	1–2	—	1–1
4	(Germany) Union Berlin	6	0	2	4	6	10	−4	2		2–3	0–1	2–3	—

Source: UEFA

===== Group D =====
Pos	Team	Pld	W	D	L	GF	GA	GD	Pts	Qualification	RSO	INT	BEN	SAL
1	(Spain) Real Sociedad	6	3	3	0	7	2	+5	12 (Note: Tied on head-to-head points, goal difference, and goals scored. Goal difference in all matches: Real Sociedad +5, Inter Milan +3.)	Advance to knockout phase	—	1–1	3–1	0–0
2	(Italy) Inter Milan	6	3	3	0	8	5	+3	12	Advance to knockout phase	0–0	—	1–0	2–1
3	(Portugal) Benfica	6	1	1	4	7	11	−4	4 (Note: Tied on head-to-head points, goal difference, goals scored, and goal difference in all matches. Goals scored in all matches: Benfica 7, Red Bull Salzburg 4.)	Transfer to Europa League	0–1	3–3	—	0–2
4	(Austria) Red Bull Salzburg	6	1	1	4	4	8	−4	4		0–2	0–1	1–3	—

Source: UEFA

===== Group E =====
Pos	Team	Pld	W	D	L	GF	GA	GD	Pts	Qualification	ATM	LAZ	FEY	CEL
1	(Spain) Atlético Madrid	6	4	2	0	17	6	+11	14	Advance to knockout phase	—	2–0	3–2	6–0
2	(Italy) Lazio	6	3	1	2	7	7	0	10	Advance to knockout phase	1–1	—	1–0	2–0
3	(Netherlands) Feyenoord	6	2	0	4	9	10	−1	6	Transfer to Europa League	1–3	3–1	—	2–0
4	(Scotland) Celtic	6	1	1	4	5	15	−10	4		2–2	1–2	2–1	—

Source: UEFA

===== Group F =====
Pos	Team	Pld	W	D	L	GF	GA	GD	Pts	Qualification	DOR	PAR	MIL	NEW
1	(Germany) Borussia Dortmund	6	3	2	1	7	4	+3	11	Advance to knockout phase	—	1–1	0–0	2–0
2	(France) Paris Saint-Germain	6	2	2	2	9	8	+1	8 (Note: Tied on head-to-head points. Head-to-head goal difference: Paris Saint-Germain +2, Milan −2.)	Advance to knockout phase	2–0	—	3–0	1–1
3	(Italy) Milan	6	2	2	2	5	8	−3	8	Transfer to Europa League	1–3	2–1	—	0–0
4	(England) Newcastle United	6	1	2	3	6	7	−1	5		0–1	4–1	1–2	—

Source: UEFA

==== Knockout phase ====
===== Round of 16 =====
Team 1	Agg.	Team 2	1st leg	2nd leg
Napoli (Italy)	2–4	(Spain) Barcelona	1–1	1–3
Inter Milan (Italy)	2–2 (2–3 p)	(Spain) Atlético Madrid	1–0	1–2 (a.e.t.)
Lazio (Italy)	1–3	(Germany) Bayern Munich	1–0	0–3

=== UEFA Europa League ===
==== Group stage ====
===== Group D =====
Pos	Team	Pld	W	D	L	GF	GA	GD	Pts	Qualification	ATA	SCP	STU	RAK
1	(Italy) Atalanta	6	4	2	0	12	4	+8	14	Advance to round of 16	—	1–1	1–0	2–0
2	(Portugal) Sporting CP	6	3	2	1	10	6	+4	11	Advance to knockout round play-offs	1–2	—	3–0	2–1
3	(Austria) Sturm Graz	6	1	1	4	4	9	−5	4 (Note: Tied on head-to-head results. Overall goal difference used as a tiebreaker.)	Transfer to Europa Conference League	2–2	1–2	—	0–1
4	(Poland) Raków Częstochowa	6	1	1	4	3	10	−7	4		0–4	1–1	0–1	—

Source: UEFA

===== Group G =====
Pos	Team	Pld	W	D	L	GF	GA	GD	Pts	Qualification	SLP	ROM	SRV	SHE
1	(Czech Republic) Slavia Prague	6	5	0	1	17	4	+13	15	Advance to round of 16	—	2–0	4–0	6–0
2	(Italy) Roma	6	4	1	1	12	4	+8	13	Advance to knockout round play-offs	2–0	—	4–0	3–0
3	(Switzerland) Servette	6	1	2	3	4	13	−9	5	Transfer to Europa Conference League	0–2	1–1	—	2–1
4	(Moldova) Sheriff Tiraspol	6	0	1	5	5	17	−12	1		2–3	1–2	1–1	—

Source: UEFA

==== Knockout phase ====
===== Knockout round play-offs =====
Team 1	Agg.	Team 2	1st leg	2nd leg
Feyenoord (Netherlands)	2–2 (2–4 p)	(Italy) Roma	1–1	1–1 (a.e.t.)
Milan (Italy)	5–3	(France) Rennes	3–0	2–3

===== Round of 16 =====
Team 1	Agg.	Team 2	1st leg	2nd leg
Roma (Italy)	4–1	(England) Brighton & Hove Albion	4–0	0–1
Sporting CP (Portugal)	2–3	(Italy) Atalanta	1–1	1–2
Milan (Italy)	7–3	(Czech Republic) Slavia Prague	4–2	3–1

===== Quarter-finals =====
Team 1	Agg.	Team 2	1st leg	2nd leg
Milan (Italy)	1–3	(Italy) Roma	0–1	1–2
Liverpool (England)	1–3	(Italy) Atalanta	0–3	1–0

===== Semi-finals =====
Team 1	Agg.	Team 2	1st leg	2nd leg
Marseille (France)	1–4	(Italy) Atalanta	1–1	0–3
Roma (Italy)	2–4	(Germany) Bayer Leverkusen	0–2	2–2

===== Final =====
22 May 2024
20:00 UTC+1

Atalanta (Italy)	3–0	(Germany) Bayer Leverkusen
Lookman 12', 26', 75'	Report

Aviva Stadium, Dublin
Attendance: 47,135
Referee: István Kovács (Romania)

=== UEFA Europa Conference League ===
==== Qualifying phase and play-off round ====
Team 1	Agg.	Team 2	1st leg	2nd leg
Rapid Wien (Austria)	1–2	(Italy) Fiorentina	1–0	0–2

==== Group stage ====
===== Group F =====
Pos	Team	Pld	W	D	L	GF	GA	GD	Pts	Qualification	FIO	FER	GNK	ČUK
1	(Italy) Fiorentina	6	3	3	0	14	6	+8	12	Advance to round of 16	—	2–2	2–1	6–0
2	(Hungary) Ferencváros	6	2	4	0	9	6	+3	10	Advance to knockout round play-offs	1–1	—	1–1	3–1
3	(Belgium) Genk	6	2	3	1	8	5	+3	9		2–2	0–0	—	2–0
4	(Serbia) Čukarički	6	0	0	6	2	16	−14	0		0–1	1–2	0–2	—

Source: UEFA

==== Knockout phase ====
===== Round of 16 =====
Team 1	Agg.	Team 2	1st leg	2nd leg
Maccabi Haifa (Israel)	4–5	(Italy) Fiorentina	3–4	1–1

===== Quarter-finals =====
Team 1	Agg.	Team 2	1st leg	2nd leg
Viktoria Plzeň (Czech Republic)	0–2	(Italy) Fiorentina	0–0	0–2 (a.e.t.)

===== Semi-finals =====
Team 1	Agg.	Team 2	1st leg	2nd leg
Fiorentina (Italy)	4–3	(Belgium) Club Brugge	3–2	1–1

===== Final =====
29 May 2024
22:00 UTC+3

Olympiacos (Greece)	1–0 (a.e.t.)	(Italy) Fiorentina
El Kaabi 116'	Report

Agia Sophia Stadium, Athens
Attendance: 26,842
Referee: Artur Soares Dias (Portugal)

=== UEFA Youth League ===
==== UEFA Champions League Path ====
===== Group stage =====
====== Group C ======
Pos	Team	Pld	W	D	L	GF	GA	GD	Pts	Qualification	RMA	BRA	NAP	UNB
1	(Royal Spanish Football Federation) Real Madrid	6	4	2	0	14	1	+13	14	Round of 16	—	0–0	6–0	2–1
2	(Portuguese Football Federation) Braga	6	3	3	0	8	3	+5	12	Play-offs	0–0	—	1–0	1–0
3	(Italian Football Federation) Napoli	6	1	1	4	4	17	−13	4		0–4	2–2	—	1–0
4	(German Football Association) Union Berlin	6	1	0	5	6	11	−5	3		0–2	1–4	4–1	—

Source: UEFA

====== Group D ======
Pos	Team	Pld	W	D	L	GF	GA	GD	Pts	Qualification	SAL	INT	BEN	RSO
1	(Austrian Football Association) Red Bull Salzburg	6	4	2	0	16	8	+8	14	Round of 16	—	1–1	4–2	5–2
2	(Italian Football Federation) Inter Milan	6	1	4	1	9	9	0	7	Play-offs	2–3	—	1–1	1–0
3	(Portuguese Football Federation) Benfica	6	1	3	2	8	10	−2	6		1–1	1–1	—	2–1
4	(Royal Spanish Football Federation) Real Sociedad	6	1	1	4	8	14	−6	4		0–2	3–3	2–1	—

Source: UEFA

====== Group E ======
Pos	Team	Pld	W	D	L	GF	GA	GD	Pts	Qualification	FEY	ATM	LAZ	CEL
1	(Royal Dutch Football Association) Feyenoord	6	4	1	1	13	7	+6	13	Round of 16	—	0–1	2–2	3–0
2	(Royal Spanish Football Federation) Atlético Madrid	6	4	0	2	10	3	+7	12	Play-offs	1–2	—	0–1	4–0
3	(Italian Football Federation) Lazio	6	1	2	3	5	10	−5	5		1–3	0–2	—	0–2
4	(Scottish Football Association) Celtic	6	1	1	4	5	13	−8	4		2–3	0–2	1–1	—

Source: UEFA

====== Group F ======
Pos	Team	Pld	W	D	L	GF	GA	GD	Pts	Qualification	MIL	DOR	NEW	PAR
1	(Italian Football Federation) Milan	6	4	0	2	14	8	+6	12	Round of 16	—	4–1	4–0	3–2
2	(German Football Association) Borussia Dortmund	6	3	1	2	9	9	0	10	Play-offs	1–2	—	2–2	2–0
3	(The Football Association) Newcastle United	6	2	1	3	8	11	−3	7		3–1	1–2	—	0–1
4	(French Football Federation) Paris Saint-Germain	6	2	0	4	5	8	−3	6		1–0	0–1	1–2	—

Source: UEFA

==== Domestic Champions Path ====
===== First Round =====
Team 1	Agg.	Team 2	1st leg	2nd leg
Olympiacos (Greece)	6–2	(Italy) Lecce	3–1	3–1

==== Knockout phase ====
===== Play-offs =====
Team 1	Score	Team 2
Olympiacos (Greece)	0–0 (6–5 p)	(Italy) Inter Milan

===== Round of 16 =====
Team 1	Score	Team 2
Milan (Italy)	2–2 (4–2 p)	(Portugal) Braga

===== Quarter-finals =====
Team 1	Score	Team 2
Milan (Italy)	1–1 (4–3 p)	(Spain) Real Madrid

===== Semi-finals =====
Team 1	Score	Team 2
FC Porto (Portugal)	2–2 (3–4 p)	(Italy) Milan

===== Final =====
The final was played on 22 April 2024 at Colovray Stadium, Nyon.

22 April 2024
18:00

Olympiacos (Greece)	3–0	(Italy) Milan
Mouzakitis 60' (pen.); Papakanellos 61'; Bakoulas 66'	Report

Colovray Stadium, Nyon
Attendance: 2,026
Referee: John Brooks (England)

=== UEFA Women's Champions League ===
==== Qualifying rounds ====
===== Round 1 =====
====== Semi-finals ======
Team 1	Score	Team 2
Juventus (Italy)	6–0	(Kazakhstan) Okzhetpes

====== Final ======
Team 1	Score	Team 2
Juventus (Italy)	1–1 (a.e.t.) (4–5 p)	(Germany) Eintracht Frankfurt

===== Round 2 =====
Team 1	Agg.	Team 2	1st leg	2nd leg
Roma (Italy)	9–1	(Ukraine) Vorskla Poltava	3–0	6–1

=== Group C ===
Pos	Team	Pld	W	D	L	GF	GA	GD	Pts	Qualification	PSG	AJA	BAY	ROM
1	(France) Paris Saint-Germain	6	3	1	2	10	8	+2	10	Advance to quarter-finals	—	3–1	0–1	2–1
2	(Netherlands) Ajax	6	3	1	2	7	8	−1	10	Advance to quarter-finals	2–0	—	1–0	2–1
3	(Germany) Bayern Munich	6	1	4	1	8	8	0	7		2–2	1–1	—	2–2
4	(Italy) Roma	6	1	2	3	10	11	−1	5		1–3	3–0	2–2	—

Source: UEFA
Rules for classification: Group stage tiebreakers
