= Nhaga =

Nhaga is a Bissau-Guinean surname. Notable people with the surname include:

- Renato Nhaga (born 2007), Bissau-Guinean football midfielder for Casa Pia
- Serif Nhaga (born 2005), Bissau-Guinean football left-back for Sampdoria
