= 2023–24 UEFA Youth League =

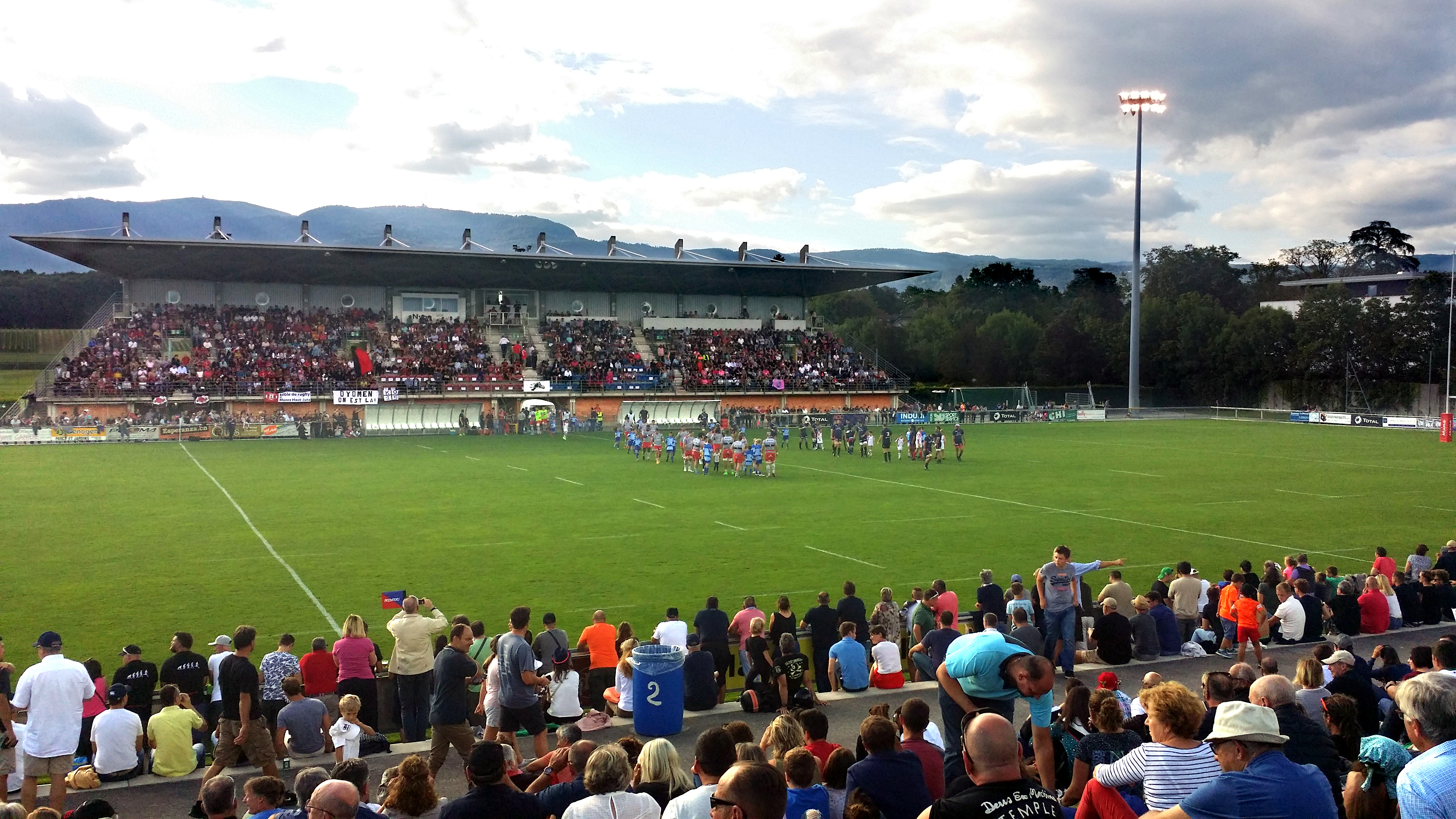
- The Colovray Stadium in Nyon hosted the semi-finals and final

Tournament details
- Dates: 19 September 2023 – 22 April 2024
- Teams: 64 (from 35 associations)

Final positions
- Champions: (Greece) Olympiacos (1st title)
- Runners-up: (Italy) Milan

Tournament statistics
- Matches played: 166
- Goals scored: 486 (2.93 per match)
- Attendance: 258,941 (1,560 per match)
- Top scorer(s): (Algeria) Amin Chiakha (Copenhagen) (Portugal) Rodrigo Mora (Porto); 7 goals each

The 2023–24 UEFA Youth League was the tenth season of the UEFA Youth League, a European youth club football competition organised by UEFA.

The title holders were AZ, who defeated Hajduk Split 5–0 in the previous edition's final, but they were eliminated in the round of 16. Olympiacos beat Milan 3–0 in the final held at the Colovray Stadium in Nyon, Switzerland, to secure their first title in the competition and become the first Greek team to ever win a UEFA club competition (the club's senior team won the 2024 UEFA Europa Conference League final five weeks later).

== Teams ==
A total of 64 teams from 35 of the 55 UEFA member associations entered the tournament. They were split into two sections, each with 32 teams.

- UEFA Champions League Path: The youth teams of the 32 clubs which qualified for the 2023–24 UEFA Champions League group stage entered the UEFA Champions League Path. If there was a vacancy (youth teams not entering), it was filled by a team defined by UEFA.
- Domestic Champions Path: The youth domestic champions of the top 32 associations according to their 2023 UEFA country coefficients entered the Domestic Champions Path. If there was a vacancy (associations with no youth domestic competition, as well as youth domestic champions already included in the UEFA Champions League path), it was first filled by the title holders should they have not yet qualified, and then by the youth domestic champions of the next association in the UEFA ranking.

Antwerp, Braga, Dinamo Minsk, Famalicão, İstanbul Başakşehir, Klaipėda, Lazio, Lecce, Lens, Mainz, Newcastle, Pafos, Partizan, Sarajevo, Union Berlin, and Universitatea Craiova made their tournament debuts.

Qualified teams for 2023–24 UEFA Youth League
Rank	Association	Teams	
Rank	Association	UEFA Champions League Path	Domestic Champions Path
1	England	Manchester City (2022–23 U18 Premier League); Arsenal; Manchester United; Newcastle United	
2	Spain	Barcelona; Real Madrid (2022–23 División de Honor Juvenil U-19); Atlético Madrid; Real Sociedad; Sevilla	
3	Italy	Napoli; Lazio; Inter Milan; Milan	Lecce (2022–23 Campionato Primavera 1)
4	Germany	Bayern Munich; Borussia Dortmund; RB Leipzig; Union Berlin	Mainz 05 (2022–23 A-Junioren-Bundesliga)
5	France	Paris Saint-Germain; Lens	Nantes (2022–23 Championnat National U19)
6	Portugal	Benfica; Porto; Braga	Famalicão (2022–23 Campeonato Nacional Juniores S19)
7	Netherlands	Feyenoord; PSV Eindhoven (2022–23 Eredivisie U19)	AZ (TH)
8	Austria	Red Bull Salzburg (2022–23 Jugendliga U18)	
9	Scotland	Celtic	Hamilton Academical (2022–23 Scottish U18 League)
11	Serbia	Red Star Belgrade	Partizan (2022–23 Serbian U19 League)
12	Ukraine	Shakhtar Donetsk	Rukh Lviv (2022–23 Ukrainian Premier League Under-19)
13	Belgium	Antwerp	Gent (2022–23 Belgian U18 League)
14	Switzerland	Young Boys	Basel (2022–23 Swiss U18 League)
15	Greece		Olympiacos (2022–23 Superleague K19)
16	Czech Republic		Sparta Prague (2022–23 Czech U19 League)
17	Norway		Molde (2022 Norwegian U19 Cup)
18	Denmark	Copenhagen	Midtjylland (2022–23 U19 Ligaen)
19	Croatia		Dinamo Zagreb (2022–23 1. HNL Juniori U19)
20	Turkey	Galatasaray	İstanbul Başakşehir (2022–23 U19 Elit)
21	Cyprus		Pafos (2022–23 Cypriot U19 League)
22	Israel		Maccabi Haifa (2022–23 Israeli U19 Noar Premier League)
23	Sweden		Malmö FF (2022 P17 Allsvenskan)
24	Bulgaria		Ludogorets Razgrad (2022–23 U18 BFU Cup)
25	Romania		Universitatea Craiova (2022–23 Liga de Tineret)
26	Azerbaijan		Gabala (2022–23 Azerbaijani U19 League)
27	Hungary		Puskás Akadémia (2022–23 Hungarian U19 League)
28	Poland		Lech Poznań (2022–23 Polish U19 Central Junior League)
29	Kazakhstan		Turan (2022 Kazakhstani U17 League)
30	Slovakia		Žilina (2022–23 Slovak U19 League)
31	Slovenia		Maribor (2022–23 Slovenian U19 League)
32	Belarus		Dinamo Minsk (2022 Belarusian U18 League)
33	Moldova		Sheriff Tiraspol (2022–23 Divizia Națională U19)
34	Lithuania		Klaipėda (2022 Lithuanian Elite Youth League U19 Division)
35	Bosnia and Herzegovina		Sarajevo (2022–23 Bosnia and Herzegovina U19 Junior League)
36	Finland		HJK (2022 U17 B-Junior League)

Associations without any participating teams (no teams qualified for UEFA Champions League group stage, and either with no youth domestic competition or not ranked high enough for a vacancy)

Rank	Association
10	Russia
37	Luxembourg
38	Latvia
39	Kosovo
40	Republic of Ireland
41	Armenia
42	Northern Ireland

Rank	Association
43	Albania
44	Faroe Islands
45	Estonia
46	Malta
47	Georgia
48	North Macedonia
49	Liechtenstein

Rank	Association
50	Wales
51	Gibraltar
52	Iceland
53	Montenegro
54	Andorra
55	San Marino

Notes

1. ^{TH} Title holders.
2. ^{YC} Teams playing in the UEFA Champions League Path which were also youth domestic champions.
3. ^{PO} Teams playing in the UEFA Champions League Path after their senior team qualified for the Champions League group stage via play-offs.
4. ^{V-RUS} Team playing in the Domestic Champions Path through the vacancy of Russia (excluded from UEFA competitions).
5. ^{V-YC} Teams playing in the Domestic Champions Path through the vacancies of teams which qualified for the Champions League group stage automatically.
6. ^{V-PO} Teams playing in the Domestic Champions Path through the vacancies of teams which qualified for the Champions League group stage via play-offs.
7. Russia (RUS): On 28 February 2022, Russian football clubs and national teams were suspended from FIFA and UEFA competitions due to the Russian invasion of Ukraine. The tables reflect Russia's ongoing suspension from UEFA competitions.

== Round and draw dates ==
The schedule of the competition was as follows.

- For the UEFA Champions League Path group stage, in principle the teams played their matches on Tuesdays and Wednesdays of the matchdays as scheduled for UEFA Champions League, and on the same day as the corresponding senior teams; however, matches could also be played on other dates, including Mondays and Thursdays.
- For the Domestic Champions Path first and second rounds, in principle matches were played on Wednesdays (first round on matchdays 2 and 3, second round on matchdays 4 and 5, as scheduled for UEFA Champions League); however, matches could also be played on other dates, including Mondays, Tuesdays and Thursdays.

Schedule for 2023–24 UEFA Youth League
Phase	Round	Draw date	First leg	Second leg
UEFA Champions League Path; Group stage	Matchday 1	31 August 2023	19–20 September 2023	
UEFA Champions League Path; Group stage	Matchday 2	31 August 2023	3–4 October 2023	
UEFA Champions League Path; Group stage	Matchday 3	31 August 2023	24–25 October 2023	
UEFA Champions League Path; Group stage	Matchday 4	31 August 2023	7–8 November 2023	
UEFA Champions League Path; Group stage	Matchday 5	31 August 2023	28–29 November 2023	
UEFA Champions League Path; Group stage	Matchday 6	31 August 2023	12–13 December 2023	
Domestic Champions Path	First round	5 September 2023	4 October 2023	25 October 2023
Domestic Champions Path	Second round	5 September 2023	8 November 2023	29 November 2023
Knockout phase	Knockout round play-offs	19 December 2023	6–7 February 2024	
Knockout phase	Round of 16	9 February 2024	27–28 February 2024	
Knockout phase	Quarter-finals	9 February 2024	12–13 March 2024	
Knockout phase	Semi-finals	9 February 2024	19 April 2024 at Colovray Stadium, Nyon	
Knockout phase	Final	9 February 2024	22 April 2024 at Colovray Stadium, Nyon	

== UEFA Champions League Path ==
For the UEFA Champions League Path, the 32 teams were drawn into eight groups of four. There was no separate draw held, with the group compositions identical to the draw for the 2023–24 UEFA Champions League group stage, which was held on 31 August 2023.

In each group, teams played against each other home-and-away in a round-robin format. The group winners advanced to the round of 16, while the eight runners-up advanced to the play-offs, where they would be joined by the eight second round winners from the Domestic Champions Path.

=== Group A ===
Pos	Team	Pld	W	D	L	GF	GA	GD	Pts	Qualification	CPH	BAY	GAL	MUN
1	(Danish Football Association) Copenhagen	6	4	1	1	18	7	+11	13	Advance to round of 16	—	3–2	6–0	2–2
2	(German Football Association) Bayern Munich	6	4	0	2	11	7	+4	12	Advance to play-offs	2–1	—	2–1	2–0
3	(Turkish Football Federation) Galatasaray	6	2	0	4	5	17	−12	6		1–5	2–1	—	1–0
4	(The Football Association) Manchester United	6	1	1	4	5	8	−3	4		0–1	0–2	3–0	—

Source: UEFA

=== Group B ===
Pos	Team	Pld	W	D	L	GF	GA	GD	Pts	Qualification	LEN	SEV	PSV	ARS
1	(French Football Federation) Lens	6	4	1	1	7	4	+3	13	Advance to round of 16	—	1–1	2–1	1–0
2	(Royal Spanish Football Federation) Sevilla	6	2	3	1	6	5	+1	9	Advance to play-offs	0–1	—	1–0	2–1
3	(Royal Dutch Football Association) PSV Eindhoven	6	2	1	3	7	8	−1	7		2–0	1–1	—	1–3
4	(The Football Association) Arsenal	6	1	1	4	6	9	−3	4		0–2	1–1	1–2	—

Source: UEFA

=== Group C ===
Pos	Team	Pld	W	D	L	GF	GA	GD	Pts	Qualification	RMA	BRA	NAP	UNB
1	(Royal Spanish Football Federation) Real Madrid	6	4	2	0	14	1	+13	14	Advance to round of 16	—	0–0	6–0	2–1
2	(Portuguese Football Federation) Braga	6	3	3	0	8	3	+5	12	Advance to play-offs	0–0	—	1–0	1–0
3	(Italian Football Federation) Napoli	6	1	1	4	4	17	−13	4		0–4	2–2	—	1–0
4	(German Football Association) Union Berlin	6	1	0	5	6	11	−5	3		0–2	1–4	4–1	—

Source: UEFA

=== Group D ===
Pos	Team	Pld	W	D	L	GF	GA	GD	Pts	Qualification	SAL	INT	BEN	RSO
1	(Austrian Football Association) Red Bull Salzburg	6	4	2	0	16	8	+8	14	Advance to round of 16	—	1–1	4–2	5–2
2	(Italian Football Federation) Inter Milan	6	1	4	1	9	9	0	7	Advance to play-offs	2–3	—	1–1	1–0
3	(Portuguese Football Federation) Benfica	6	1	3	2	8	10	−2	6		1–1	1–1	—	2–1
4	(Royal Spanish Football Federation) Real Sociedad	6	1	1	4	8	14	−6	4		0–2	3–3	2–1	—

Source: UEFA

=== Group E ===
Pos	Team	Pld	W	D	L	GF	GA	GD	Pts	Qualification	FEY	ATM	LAZ	CEL
1	(Royal Dutch Football Association) Feyenoord	6	4	1	1	13	7	+6	13	Advance to round of 16	—	0–1	2–2	3–0
2	(Royal Spanish Football Federation) Atlético Madrid	6	4	0	2	10	3	+7	12	Advance to play-offs	1–2	—	0–1	4–0
3	(Italian Football Federation) Lazio	6	1	2	3	5	10	−5	5		1–3	0–2	—	0–2
4	(Scottish Football Association) Celtic	6	1	1	4	5	13	−8	4		2–3	0–2	1–1	—

Source: UEFA

=== Group F ===
Pos	Team	Pld	W	D	L	GF	GA	GD	Pts	Qualification	MIL	DOR	NEW	PAR
1	(Italian Football Federation) Milan	6	4	0	2	14	8	+6	12	Advance to round of 16	—	4–1	4–0	3–2
2	(German Football Association) Borussia Dortmund	6	3	1	2	9	9	0	10	Advance to play-offs	1–2	—	2–2	2–0
3	(The Football Association) Newcastle United	6	2	1	3	8	11	−3	7		3–1	1–2	—	0–1
4	(French Football Federation) Paris Saint-Germain	6	2	0	4	5	8	−3	6		1–0	0–1	1–2	—

Source: UEFA

=== Group G ===
Pos	Team	Pld	W	D	L	GF	GA	GD	Pts	Qualification	MCI	RBL	RSB	YB
1	(The Football Association) Manchester City	6	4	2	0	17	6	+11	14	Advance to round of 16	—	2–1	5–2	3–0
2	(German Football Association) RB Leipzig	6	3	2	1	8	5	+3	11	Advance to play-offs	1–1	—	2–1	0–0
3	(Football Association of Serbia) Red Star Belgrade	6	1	1	4	8	13	−5	4 (Note: Tied on head-to head record.)		2–2	0–1	—	2–1
4	(Swiss Football Association) Young Boys	6	1	1	4	4	13	−9	4		0–4	1–3	2–1	—

Source: UEFA

=== Group H ===
Pos	Team	Pld	W	D	L	GF	GA	GD	Pts	Qualification	POR	BAR	SHK	ANT
1	(Portuguese Football Federation) Porto	6	5	0	1	17	5	+12	15 (Note: Head-to-head points: Porto 3, Barcelona 3. Head-to-head goal difference: Porto +2, Barcelona –2.)	Advance to round of 16	—	0–2	2–0	3–1
2	(Royal Spanish Football Federation) Barcelona	6	5	0	1	12	5	+7	15	Advance to play-offs	0–4	—	2–0	2–1
3	(Ukrainian Association of Football) Shakhtar Donetsk	6	2	0	4	6	13	−7	6		1–4	0–3	—	3–1
4	(Royal Belgian Football Association) Antwerp	6	0	0	6	5	17	−12	0		1–4	0–3	1–2	—

Source: UEFA

== Domestic Champions Path ==
For the Domestic Champions Path, the 32 teams were drawn into two rounds of two-legged home-and-away ties. The draw for both the first round and second round was held on 5 September 2023.

The eight second round winners advanced to the play-offs, where they were joined by the eight group runners-up from the UEFA Champions League Path (group stage).

=== First round ===
The first legs were played on 3 and 4 October and the second legs were played on 8, 24, and 25 October 2023.

Team 1	Agg.	Team 2	1st leg	2nd leg
Lech Poznań (Poland)	1–1 (2–4 p)	(France) Nantes	1–1	0–0
Pafos (Cyprus)	0–6	(Slovakia) Žilina	0–1	0–5
Rukh Lviv (Ukraine)	4–2	(Bosnia and Herzegovina) Sarajevo	1–1	3–1
Sparta Prague (Czech Republic)	w/o (Note: Due to the Gaza war, the second leg was cancelled after Maccabi Haifa withdrew from the competition, and Sparta Prague advanced on a walkover.)	(Israel) Maccabi Haifa	1–1	Canc.
AZ (Netherlands)	14–0	(Lithuania) Klaipėda	12–0	2–0
Malmö FF (Sweden)	3–5	(Finland) HJK	1–4	2–1
Molde (Norway)	5–4	(Scotland) Hamilton Academical	3–0	2–4
Famalicão (Portugal)	2–2 (6–7 p)	(Denmark) Midtjylland	2–2	0–0
Turan (Kazakhstan)	0–6	(Moldova) Sheriff Tiraspol	0–1	0–5
Universitatea Craiova (Romania)	0–5	(Serbia) Partizan	0–1	0–4
Olympiacos (Greece)	6–2	(Italy) Lecce	3–1	3–1
Dinamo Minsk (Belarus)	2–1	(Bulgaria) Ludogorets Razgrad	0–1	2–0
Maribor (Slovenia)	1–3	(Germany) Mainz 05	0–2	1–1
Gent (Belgium)	0–3	(Switzerland) Basel	0–1	0–2
Dinamo Zagreb (Croatia)	5–2	(Turkey) İstanbul Başakşehir	2–1	3–1
Gabala (Azerbaijan)	2–1	(Hungary) Puskás Akadémia	1–1	1–0

=== Second round ===
The first legs were played on 7, 8, and 29 November and the second legs were played on 22, 28, 29 November, and 3 December 2023.

Team 1	Agg.	Team 2	1st leg	2nd leg
Rukh Lviv (Ukraine)	1–4	(Denmark) Midtjylland	0–4	1–0
Nantes (France)	1–1 (4–3 p)	(Finland) HJK	1–0	0–1
Molde (Norway)	3–6	(Netherlands) AZ	3–4	0–2
Sparta Prague (Czech Republic)	6–6 (2–4 p)	(Slovakia) Žilina	2–2	4–4
Basel (Switzerland)	2–0	(Croatia) Dinamo Zagreb	2–0	0–0
Gabala (Azerbaijan)	0–7	(Greece) Olympiacos	0–3	0–4
Mainz 05 (Germany)	3–2	(Belarus) Dinamo Minsk	1–1	2–1
Sheriff Tiraspol (Moldova)	4–5	(Serbia) Partizan	2–0	2–5

== Knockout phase ==
=== Bracket ===
Knockout round play-offs
(Switzerland) Basel	0
(Germany) Bayern Munich	2
(Greece) Olympiacos (p)	0 (6)
(Italy) Inter Milan	0 (5)
(France) Nantes (p)	3 (3)
(Spain) Sevilla	3 (2)
(Slovakia) Žilina	2
(Germany) Borussia Dortmund	1
(Germany) Mainz 05 (p)	2 (6)
(Spain) Barcelona	2 (5)
(Netherlands) AZ	1
(Spain) Atlético Madrid	0
(Serbia) Partizan	0
(Portugal) Braga	2
(Denmark) Midtjylland	1 (2)
(Germany) RB Leipzig (p)	1 (4)

Round of 16
(Germany) Bayern Munich	3
(Netherlands) Feyenoord	2
(Greece) Olympiacos (p)	2 (4)
(France) Lens	2 (2)
(Austria) Red Bull Salzburg	0
(France) Nantes	1
(Slovakia) Žilina	1 (2)
(Denmark) Copenhagen (p)	1 (4)
(Germany) Mainz 05	2
(England) Manchester City	1
(Netherlands) AZ	1 (3)
(Portugal) Porto (p)	1 (4)
(Italy) Milan (p)	2 (4)
(Portugal) Braga	2 (2)
(Spain) Real Madrid	2
(Germany) RB Leipzig	0

Quarter-finals
(Germany) Bayern Munich	1
(Greece) Olympiacos	3
(France) Nantes (p)	3 (5)
(Denmark) Copenhagen	3 (4)
(Germany) Mainz 05	1
(Portugal) Porto	4
(Italy) Milan (p)	1 (4)
(Spain) Real Madrid	1 (3)

Semi-finals
19 April – Nyon
(Greece) Olympiacos (p)	0 (3)
(France) Nantes	0 (1)
19 April – Nyon
(Portugal) Porto	2 (3)
(Italy) Milan (p)	2 (4)

Final
22 April – Nyon
(Greece) Olympiacos	3
(Italy) Milan	0

=== Knockout round play-offs ===
The eight second round winners from the Domestic Champions Path were drawn against the eight group runners-up from the UEFA Champions League Path, with the teams from the Domestic Champions Path hosting the match. Teams from the same association could not be drawn against each other.

The draw was conducted on 19 December 2023 at the UEFA headquarters in Nyon. The knockout round play-offs were played over one leg on 6 and 7 February 2024.

Home team	Score	Away team
Basel (Switzerland)	0–2	(Germany) Bayern Munich
Partizan (Serbia)	0–2	(Portugal) Braga
Olympiacos (Greece)	0–0 (6–5 p)	(Italy) Inter Milan
Žilina (Slovakia)	2–1	(Germany) Borussia Dortmund
Nantes (France)	3–3 (3–2 p)	(Spain) Sevilla
Mainz 05 (Germany)	2–2 (6–5 p)	(Spain) Barcelona
Midtjylland (Denmark)	1–1 (2–4 p)	(Germany) RB Leipzig
AZ (Netherlands)	1–0	(Spain) Atlético Madrid

=== Round of 16 ===
The draw was conducted on 9 February 2024 at 13:00 CET in the UEFA headquarters in Nyon. The round of 16 was played over one leg on 27 and 28 February 2024.

Home team	Score	Away team
AZ (Netherlands)	1–1 (3–4 p)	(Portugal) Porto
Milan (Italy)	2–2 (4–2 p)	(Portugal) Braga
Real Madrid (Spain)	2–0	(Germany) RB Leipzig
Žilina (Slovakia)	1–1 (2–4 p)	(Denmark) Copenhagen
Red Bull Salzburg (Austria)	0–1	(France) Nantes
Olympiacos (Greece)	2–2 (4–2 p)	(France) Lens
Bayern Munich (Germany)	3–2	(Netherlands) Feyenoord
Mainz 05 (Germany)	2–1	(England) Manchester City

=== Quarter-finals ===
The draw was conducted on 9 February 2024 at 13:00 CET in the UEFA headquarters in Nyon. The quarter-finals were played over one leg on 12 and 13 March 2024.

Home team	Score	Away team
Mainz 05 (Germany)	1–4	(Portugal) Porto
Nantes (France)	3–3 (5–4 p)	(Denmark) Copenhagen
Bayern Munich (Germany)	1–3	(Greece) Olympiacos
Milan (Italy)	1–1 (4–3 p)	(Spain) Real Madrid

=== Semi-finals ===
The draw was conducted on 9 February 2024 at 13:00 CET in the UEFA headquarters in Nyon. The semi-finals were played over one leg on 19 April 2024.

Team 1	Score	Team 2
Olympiacos (Greece)	0–0 (3–1 p)	(France) Nantes
Porto (Portugal)	2–2 (3–4 p)	(Italy) Milan

=== Final ===
The final was played on 22 April 2024 at Colovray Stadium, Nyon.

22 April 2024
18:00

Olympiacos (Greece)	3–0	(Italy) Milan
Mouzakitis 60' (pen.); Papakanellos 61'; Bakoulas 66'	Report

Colovray Stadium, Nyon
Attendance: 2,026
Referee: John Brooks (England)

== Top goalscorers ==
Rank	Player	Team	Goals	Matches played
1	(Algeria) Amin Chiakha	(Denmark) Copenhagen	7	8
1	(Portugal) Rodrigo Mora	(Portugal) Porto	7	9
3	(Greece) Christos Mouzakitis	(Greece) Olympiacos	6	8
3	(Guinea-Bissau) Anhá Candé	(Portugal) Porto	6	9
5	(Netherlands) Yoël van den Ban	(Netherlands) AZ	5	6
5	(Czech Republic) Yannick Eduardo	(Germany) RB Leipzig	5	7
5	(Greece) Charalampos Kostoulas	(Greece) Olympiacos	5	8
5	(Italy) Diego Sia	(Italy) Milan	5	10
5	(Slovakia) Vladimír Vaľko	(Slovakia) Žilina	5	5
10	Twelve players		4	—N/a

== See also ==
- Under-20 Intercontinental Cup
- 2023–24 UEFA Champions League
