= Fabiano Rust =

Dutch footballer (born 2005)

- Rust with Feyenoord in 2025

Personal information
- Full name: Fabiano Francisco Rust
- Date of birth: 16 January 2005 (age 21)
- Place of birth: Delft, Netherlands
- Height: 1.78 m (5 ft 10 in)
- Positions: Attacking midfielder; striker

Team information
- Current team: Telstar
- Number: 19

Youth career
- SVLY
- –2014: DHC Delft
- 2014–2019: ADO Den Haag
- 2019–2026: Feyenoord

Senior career*
Years	Team	Apps	(Gls)
2026–	Telstar	2	(0)

International career
2020	Netherlands U15	2	(0)
2021–2022	Netherlands U17	6	(1)
2022–2023	Netherlands U18	4	(0)
Medal record
Representing Netherlands
UEFA European Under-17 Championship
Runner-up	2022	U-17 Team
- * Club domestic league appearances and goals as of 1 November 2026

Fabiano Francisco Rust (born 16 January 2005) is a Dutch professional footballer who plays as an attacking midfielder or striker for Eredivisie club Telstar.

Born in Delft, Rust came through the youth academies of ADO Den Haag and Feyenoord, where he signed his first professional contract in 2021 and scored 26 goals in 75 matches for the club's under-21 side. He was part of the Netherlands squad that reached the final of the 2022 UEFA European Under-17 Championship. After leaving Feyenoord without making an official first-team appearance, he joined Telstar as a free agent in July 2026 following a trial.

== Early life ==
Fabiano Francisco Rust was born in Delft on 16 January 2005. He began playing football at SVLY in The Hague and DHC in Delft. At the age of nine, he joined the youth academy of ADO Den Haag. After five years there, he moved to the Feyenoord academy in the summer of 2019, aged 14.

== Club career ==
=== Feyenoord ===
On 20 April 2021, Rust signed his first professional contract with Feyenoord, a three-year deal, while playing for the club's under-16 side. Technical director Frank Arnesen described him as "a refined striker, very mobile and a boy who scores easily". Rust said he would work hard to reach De Kuip and had every confidence that he would succeed. He later said the club had wanted to tie him down because of his mentality on and off the pitch and his individual qualities.

In the first months of the 2021–22 season, Rust scored on average once every 95 minutes for Feyenoord's under-17 side. By April 2022, he had scored 16 goals and provided three assists in 18 matches for the under-17s and had already played minutes for the under-21 side. His season was interrupted by a hamstring injury that kept him out for ten weeks.

He moved up to Feyenoord's under-21 side in the summer of 2023. In the 2023–24 UEFA Youth League, he scored the third goal in stoppage time of a 3–1 away win over Lazio's under-19 side, a result that kept Feyenoord top of their group. On 4 December 2023, he signed a new contract in the press centre at De Kuip that tied him to the club until mid-2026. Head of academy Rini Coolen said Rust was making excellent progress as a physically strong striker who scored easily, which he had shown that season for the under-21s and the under-19s in the Youth League. Rust said it meant a lot to him to extend his contract at what was, in his eyes, the most beautiful club in the Netherlands, and that he hoped to develop into a complete striker and eventually make the step up to the first team.

Rust featured for the first team in pre-season under Robin van Persie in the summer of 2025 but did not establish himself in the senior squad. ADO Den Haag, SC Heerenveen and NAC Breda were all reported to be interested in signing him that August. He stayed at Feyenoord, he was overtaken by Shaqueel van Persie in the pecking order. In April 2026, it emerged that his contract would not be extended. He left the club after 75 matches, 26 goals and five assists for the under-21 side, which did not win promotion to the Tweede Divisie during his time there. He never made an official appearance for the first team.

=== Telstar ===
As a free agent, Rust attracted interest from Telstar, Fortuna Sittard, clubs at the top of the Eerste Divisie and clubs in Italy. He began training with Telstar on trial in late June 2026. After four weeks, during which he made a strong impression in pre-season friendlies and convinced new head coach Henk Brugge, he signed a contract until 2028 with an option for a further season on 23 July. He was the club's sixth signing of the summer.

Rust made his Eredivisie debut on 30 August 2026, replacing Rui Mendes in the 65th minute of a 4–0 home defeat to Ajax.

== International career ==
Rust had represented the Netherlands at youth level since 2020. He was selected for the 2022 UEFA European Under-17 Championship in Israel, where the Netherlands won all three of their group matches. He started the last of them, a 3–1 win over France on 22 May, and was replaced by Jaden Slory after 77 minutes. After a 2–1 win over Italy in the quarter-finals, the Netherlands drew 2–2 with Serbia in the semi-final on 29 May and won the penalty shoot-out 5–3. Rust came on for Slory in the 81st minute of that match. France beat the Netherlands 2–1 in the final on 1 June.

== Style of play ==
Rust has described himself as a quick striker who likes to make runs in behind and to drop in to receive the ball, and has compared himself to Donyell Malen. He is known for his mobility and his sense of space, and has been described as a refined player who added value in build-up play. Arnesen called him a refined, very mobile striker, while Coolen later described him as physically strong and a natural goalscorer. He is right-footed and has also been used as an attacking midfielder.

== Personal life ==
Rust has said that he prays and reads the Bible every day, which he says keeps him calm, grateful and motivated.

== Career statistics ==
As of match played 1 November 2026

Appearances and goals by club, season and competition
Club	Season	League			KNVB Cup		Other		Total	
Club	Season	Division	Apps	Goals	Apps	Goals	Apps	Goals	Apps	Goals
Feyenoord U21	2024–25	—			—		2 (Note: Appearances in Tweede Divisie U21 promotion/relegation playoffs)	1	2	1
Telstar	2026–27	Eredivisie	2	0	0	0	—		2	0
Career total			2	0	0	0	2	1	4	1

== Honours ==
Netherlands U17

- UEFA European Under-17 Championship runner-up: 2022
