= Rodrigo Mora (footballer, born 2007) =

Portuguese footballer

Personal information
- Full name: Rodrigo Mora de Carvalho
- Date of birth: 5 May 2007 (age 19)
- Place of birth: Matosinhos, Portugal
- Height: 1.68 m (5 ft 6 in)
- Positions: Attacking midfielder; winger

Team information
- Current team: Roma
- Number: 86

Youth career
- 2015–2016: Custóias FC
- 2016–2023: Porto

Senior career*
Years	Team	Apps	(Gls)
2023–2024	Porto B	34	(5)
2024–2026	Porto	52	(11)
2026–	Roma	10	(5)

International career^{‡}
2021–2022	Portugal U15	6	(4)
2023	Portugal U16	6	(2)
2022–2024	Portugal U17	18	(7)
2024–	Portugal U21	7	(4)
Medal record
Men's football
Representing Portugal
UEFA Nations League
Winner	2025 Germany
UEFA European Under-17 Championship
Runner-up	2024 Cyprus
- * Club domestic league appearances and goals as of 23:17, 21 November 2026 (UTC) ‡ National team caps and goals as of 17:33, 23 November 2025 (UTC)

Rodrigo Mora de Carvalho (Portuguese pronunciation: [ʁuˈdɾiɡuˈmɔɾɐ]; born 5 May 2007) is a Portuguese professional footballer who plays as an attacking midfielder or winger for Serie A club Roma.

Coming through Porto's youth system, he was promoted from the reserve side to the first-team in 2024, and helped his team win the league title in his second season with the side. In August 2026, he joined Italian side Roma.

Mora represented Portugal at various youth levels, being part of the under-17 team that finished as runners-up at the 2024 European Championship. He made the squad for the 2025 UEFA Nations League Finals, which Portugal won.

== Club career ==
=== Early career ===
Born in Matosinhos, Porto District, Mora began his youth career with hometown club Custóias FC. Despite early interest from FC Porto, he took a year off from organized football. At age of 9, after impressing as captain and best player in a local tournament, he committed to Porto's youth academy, joining them in 2016.

=== FC Porto ===
==== 2022–24: Youth career ====
He made his professional debut with Porto B as a late substitute in a 1–1 Liga Portugal 2 tie with Tondela on 15 January 2023, becoming, at the age of 15 years, 8 months and 10 days, the youngest professional debutant in the history of Portuguese football. On 2 June, Mora signed his first professional contract with Porto.

On 24 September, he was named Porto's "Young Athlete of the Year". During the 2023–24 season, he played 28 matches and scored four goals, the first being a consolation in a 3–2 loss away at Penafiel on 11 November, becoming, at the age of 16 years, 6 months, and 6 days, the youngest-ever player to score in Liga Portugal 2, a record that he only held for two months, until January 2024, when his teammate Anhá Candé broke it by a month. Furthermore, he was also a member of the Porto youth team that reached the semifinals of the 2023–24 UEFA Youth League, finishing as the tournament's joint top scorer with 7 goals, including a brace in a 1–4 win over Shakhtar Donetsk in September 2023, becoming, at the age of 16 years and four months, the youngest Portuguese to score twice in the Youth League.

==== 2024–25: Rise to the first team and breakthrough ====
After impressing at the UEFA European Under-17 Championship in the summer, Mora began training with the first team, and integrated the club's pre-season. Subsequently, he was promoted to Porto's first team for the 2024–25 season, making his debut on 25 September in a 3–2 loss away at Bodø/Glimt, during the inaugural matchday of the newly formatted UEFA Europa League league stage; in the process, Mora became the seventh youngest ever player (aged 17 years and 20 days) to play for Porto. He made his league debut, four days later, in a 4–0 win over Arouca. On 28 October, he scored his first goal for the club in a 5–0 victory away against AVS, becoming the fourth youngest player to score for the club.

Over the course of the season, his status within the team grew, despite newly arrived head coach Vítor Bruno being hesitant in starting him, Mora was given his first start in December, grabbing an assist and scoring a goal in a 3–0 victory over Moreirense on 21 December. The following match, seven days later, he scored and assisted again in a 4–0 victory over city rivals Boavista in the Invicta derby. His former head coach underlined that although he was extremely pleased with Mora, but "he still had a long way to go and a lot to achieve". Eventually, he earned a spot in the starting XI, following the inconsistent form of Porto's forwards Galeno and Pepê.

On 3 March 2025, Mora scored the winning goal in a 2–1 win over Estoril, becoming the second youngest ever player (aged 17 years and 304 days) to score five goals in the Primeira Liga, only behind Guilherme Espírito Santo in the 1936–37 season (17 years and 3 months). The following month, on 18 April, he scored a brace in a 2–1 win over Famalicão, becoming the third youngest player to score a brace in the Primeira Liga in the 21st century, only behind Cristiano Ronaldo (2002) and Roger Fernandes (2021). With Porto finishing third place in the league, he ended the campaign with 10 goals, being elected the league's Player of the Month and Midfielder of the Month in April and, on 7 May, Mora renewed his contract until June 2030. His 10 goals made him the highest U-20 goalscorer in Europe's top seven leagues, ahead of the likes of Lamine Yamal and Désiré Doué.

Mora was a member of the Porto team that competed in the 2025 FIFA Club World Cup, becoming, at the age of 18 years and 40 days, the youngest player of the tournament, scoring in a 4–4 draw with Al Ahly on 24 June, becoming the youngest-ever European goalscorer in the history of the Club World Cup, and fourth overall, only behind Lee Hyun-seung, Roberto de la Rosa, and Alexandre Pato.

==== 2025–26: League title and increasing competition ====
During the summer transfer window, Mora was heavy linked for a potential transfer to Saudi Pro League side Al-Ittihad. Following the arrival of Francesco Farioli and increased competition from Gabri Veiga for a place in midfield, doubts emerged regarding his role under Farioli’s tactical system, particularly with Veiga becoming one of Porto’s key midfield pieces. Al-Ittihad initially submitted a €50 million offer, which was immediately rejected by Porto, before returning with an improved proposal worth €63 million plus 10% of the player’s economic rights, though Porto remained firm on the player’s €70 million release clause. Mora himself was frustrated by the lack of guaranteed space under Farioli and the deal appeared close at several points during August. The transfer ultimately collapsed before the end of the window after Al-Ittihad failed to fully meet Porto's demands, leading Mora to remain at the club for the 2025–26 season.

Following the collapse of his proposed move to Al-Ittihad, Mora remained at Porto and gradually adapted to Farioli's demanding tactical system throughout the remainder of the season. Although competition from Gabri Veiga limited his consistency as a starter in central attacking roles, Mora became increasingly important as a rotational creative option, particularly in matches where Porto needed technical quality between the lines. Farioli frequently used him in hybrid roles across midfield and attack, valuing his pressing intensity, positional intelligence, and ability to operate in tight spaces alongside Porto's more structured buildup system. He eventually contributed to important minutes across the league and European competitions, helping Porto secure the league title following a 1–0 win over Alverca on 2 May 2026.

=== Roma ===
On 19 August, Mora joined Serie A club Roma on a five-year contract with a reported €120 million release clause. Roma paid Porto a guaranteed €25 million fee, while Porto retained a 50% sell-on clause. The deal also included an option for Roma to buy out Porto's 50% sell-on rights for an additional €25 million.

He made his competitive debut on 24 August, starting and playing 54 minutes before being replaced by Matías Soulé, in a 4–0 home win over Fiorentina and scored his first goal in a 4–0 victory over Lecce on 31 August.

== International career ==
Mora started his youth career for Portugal, scoring in the 3–1 win for the under-15 team against Finland in Cidade do Futebol on 25 November 2021. With the under-17 side, Mora participated in the 2024 UEFA European Under-17 Championship in Cyprus. He finished as top scorer in the tournament with five goals, helping Portugal to a runners-up finish, after losing in the final 3–0 to Italy. For his performances throughout the competition, he was named in the "Team of the Tournament".

On 10 September 2024, Mora made his under-21 debut, assisting the second goal in a 2–0 win over Croatia in the 2025 UEFA European Championship qualifying stage.

Mora was called up to the Portugal senior team on 20 May 2025, for the 2025 UEFA Nations League Finals that were played in June, being part of the team that won the tournament, despite not making an appearance.

== Personal life ==
Mora's father is José Manuel, a former professional footballer who played as a defender for several clubs including Leixões, Braga and Moreirense. Mora is a Catholic.

== Style of play ==
Mora is a highly technical, right-footed attacking midfielder who can also operate as an inverted winger. His style is defined by his low center of gravity, tight ball control, and intelligent spatial awareness, allowing him to receive between lines and manipulate tempo effectively, often delivering incisive through balls and contributing to fluid attacking sequences. He excels in short passing combinations and progressive carries, often dictating play in the final third with incisive through balls or quick one-two's. Though not physically imposing, he compensates with balance, agility, and anticipation, contributing both as a playmaker and secondary goal threat.

== Career statistics ==
=== Club ===
As of match played 21 November 2026

Appearances and goals by club, season and competition
Club	Season	League			National cup (Note: Includes Taça de Portugal)		League cup (Note: Includes Taça da Liga)		Europe		Other		Total	
Club	Season	Division	Apps	Goals	Apps	Goals	Apps	Goals	Apps	Goals	Apps	Goals	Apps	Goals
Porto B	2022–23	Liga Portugal 2	1	0	—		—		—		—		1	0
Porto B	2023–24	Liga Portugal 2	28	4	—		—		—		—		28	4
Porto B	2024–25	Liga Portugal 2	5	1	—		—		—		—		5	1
Porto B	Total		34	5	—		—		—		—		34	5
Porto	2024–25	Primeira Liga	23	10	2	0	2	0	5 (Note: Appearances in UEFA Europa League)	0	3 (Note: Appearances in FIFA Club World Cup)	1	35	11
Porto	2025–26	Primeira Liga	28	1	6	1	1	0	9	3	—		44	5
Porto	2026–27	Primeira Liga	1	0	—		—		—		0	0	1	0
Porto	Total		52	11	8	1	3	0	14	3	3	1	80	16
Roma	2026–27	Serie A	10	5	0	0	—		4 (Note: Appearances in UEFA Champions League)	0	—		14	5
Career total			96	21	8	1	3	0	18	3	3	1	128	26

== Honours ==
Porto

- Primeira Liga: 2025–26
- Supertaça Cândido de Oliveira: 2026

Portugal U17

- UEFA European Under-17 Championship runner-up: 2024

Portugal

- UEFA Nations League: 2024–25

Individual

- UEFA Youth League top goalscorer: 2023–24
- UEFA European Under-17 Championship top scorer: 2024
- UEFA European Under-17 Championship Team of the Tournament: 2024
- Primeira Liga Player of the Month: April 2025
- Primeira Liga Midfielder of the Month: April 2025
