= Hugo de Llanos =

Spanish footballer (born 2005)

Personal information
- Full name: Hugo de Llanos García
- Date of birth: March 18, 2005 (age 21)
- Place of birth: Ciempozuelos, Spain
- Height: 1.75 m (5 ft 9 in)
- Position: Midfielder

Team information
- Current team: Real Madrid B
- Number: 8

Youth career
- 2009–2013: EF Valdemoro
- 2013–2024: Real Madrid

Senior career*
Years	Team	Apps	(Gls)
2024–2025	Real Madrid C	17	(5)
2025–	Real Madrid B	16	(2)
- * Club domestic league appearances and goals as of 28 August 2025

Hugo de Llanos García (born 18 March 2005) is a Spanish footballer who plays as a midfielder for Real Madrid Castilla.

== Early life ==
De Llanos was born in 2005 in Madrid, Spain.

== Career ==
De Llanos joined the youth academy of Spanish La Liga side Real Madrid at the age of eight.

== Style of play ==
De Llanos has been described as a "midfielder with a clear offensive vocation".

== Personal life ==
De Llanos has regarded England international Jude Bellingham as his football idol.
