= Mohammad Sadeqi =

Austrian footballer

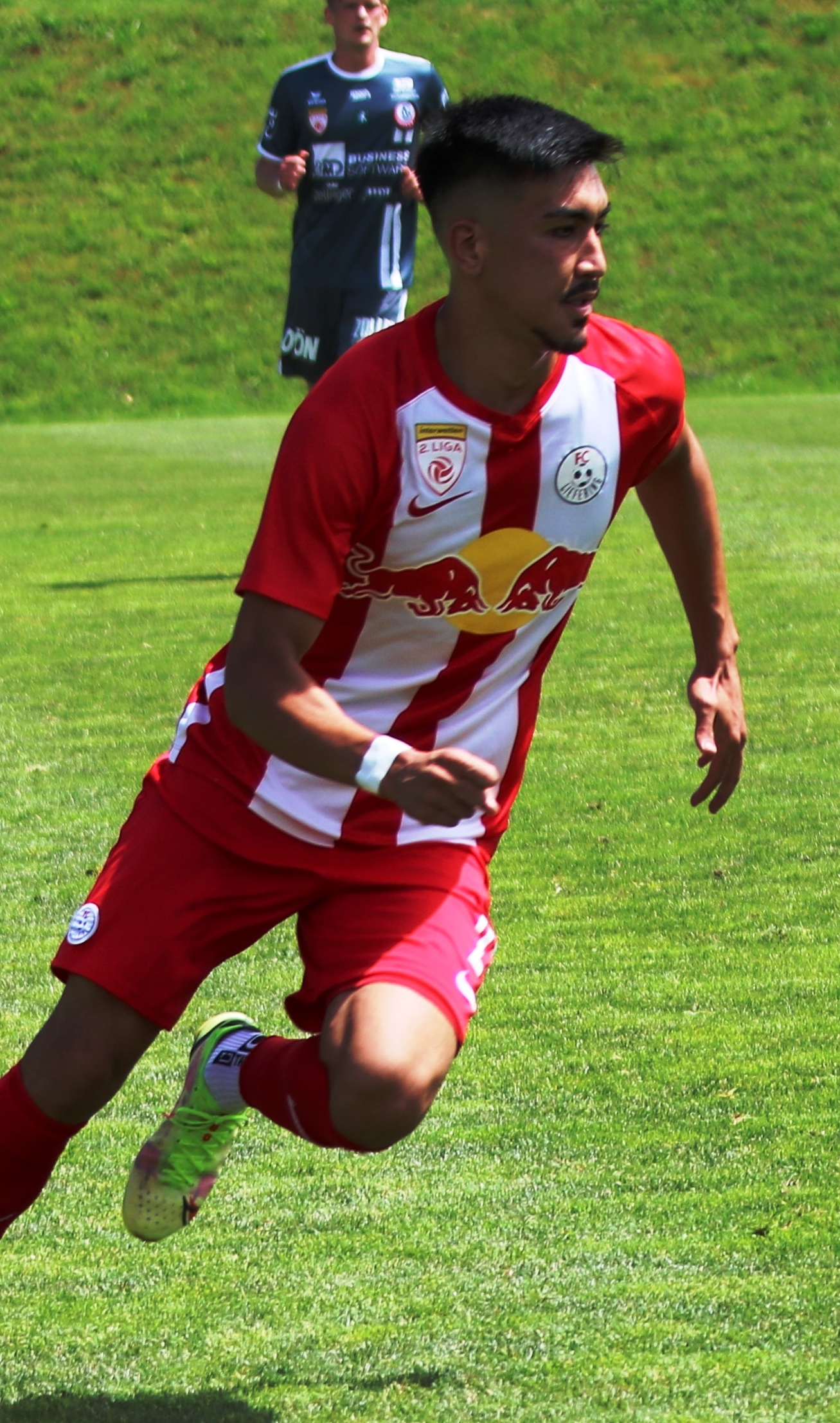
- Sadeqi in 2022

Personal information
- Date of birth: 8 January 2004 (age 22)
- Height: 1.81 m (5 ft 11 in)
- Position: Midfielder

Youth career
- 2015–2016: SU Roppen
- 2016–2017: Wacker Innsbruck
- 2017–2022: Red Bull Salzburg

Senior career*
Years	Team	Apps	(Gls)
2022–2024	FC Liefering	20	(1)
2024	→ SV Horn (loan)	8	(0)
- * Club domestic league appearances and goals as of 26 May 2024

Mohammad Sadeqi (born 8 January 2004) is an Afghan-Austrian professional footballer who plays as a midfielder.

== Club career ==
Sadeqi started his career with SU Roppen, followed by a short spell with Wacker Innsbruck, before joining the academy of Red Bull Salzburg.

On 31 January 2024, Sadeqi was loaned by SV Horn.

== International career ==
Sadeqi is eligible to represent Austria and Afghanistan at international level.

== Career statistics ==
=== Club ===
As of 2 November 2022.

Appearances and goals by club, season and competition
Club	Season	League			Cup		Other		Total	
Club	Season	Division	Apps	Goals	Apps	Goals	Apps	Goals	Apps	Goals
FC Liefering	2022–23	2. Liga	3	0	–		0	0	3	0
Career total			3	0	0	0	0	0	3	0
