= Amadou Sarr =

Italian footballer (born 2004)

Personal information
- Full name: Amadou Makhtarlayi Sarr
- Date of birth: 28 June 2004 (age 22)
- Place of birth: Gossas, Senegal
- Height: 1.90 m (6 ft 3 in)
- Position: Striker

Team information
- Current team: Trapani

Youth career
- –2018: ASD Liventina
- 2018–2024: Inter Milan

Senior career*
Years	Team	Apps	(Gls)
2024–2025	Inter Milan	0	(0)
2024–2025	→ Foggia (loan)	17	(1)
2025	Inter Milan U23	0	(0)
2025–2026	AlbinoLeffe	14	(1)
2026	→ Campobasso (loan)	7	(1)
2026–	Trapani	0	(0)
- * Club domestic league appearances and goals as of 30 April 2026

Amadou Makhtarlayi Sarr (born 28 June 2004) is an Italian-Senegalese footballer who plays as a striker for Serie D club Trapani.

== Early life ==
Sarr moved from Senegal to Ormelle, Italy at a young age.

== Career ==
As a youth player, Sarr joined the youth academy of Serie A side Inter.

On 19 July 2024, Sarr joined Serie C club Foggia on a season-long loan.

In the summer of 2025, Sarr initially returned to Inter Milan and was assigned to their newly established reserve team, Inter Milan Under-23, before making a permanent move to Serie C side AlbinoLeffe on 20 August.

== Style of play ==
Sarr mainly operates as a striker and is left-footed.

== Personal life ==
Sarr is the son of a Senegalese footballer.
