= Oleh Pushkarov =

Ukrainian footballer

Personal information
- Full name: Oleh Dmytrovych Pushkarov
- Date of birth: 11 June 2004 (age 22)
- Place of birth: Kotovsk, Ukraine
- Height: 1.78 m (5 ft 10 in)
- Position: Forward

Team information
- Current team: Chornomorets Odesa
- Number: 27

Youth career
- 2016–2017: Dnipro-2004
- 2017–2024: Shakhtar Donetsk

Senior career*
Years	Team	Apps	(Gls)
2024–2026	Shakhtar Donetsk	0	(0)
2024–2025	→ Inhulets Petrove (loan)	27	(2)
2025–2026	→ FC Kudrivka (loan)	12	(0)
2026–	Chornomorets Odesa	7	(0)

International career^{‡}
2019	Ukraine U15	5	(1)
2022–2023	Ukraine U19	6	(0)
- * Club domestic league appearances and goals as of 26 October 2026 ‡ National team caps and goals as of 26 October 2023

Oleh Dmytrovych Pushkarov (Ukrainian: Олег Дмитрович Пушкарьов; born 11 June 2004) is a Ukrainian professional footballer who plays as a forward for Chornomorets Odesa.

== Career ==
Born in the city of Kotovsk, Odesa Oblast. From 2016 to 2017, he played for Dnipro-2004 in regional youth competitions. Between 2017 and 2020, he played for Shakhtar Donetsk within the framework of the DYUFLU. Starting from the 2020–21 season, he represented the Donetsk club in the Ukrainian youth championship. He made his debut in the UEFA Youth League on September 15, 2021, in a 5–0 away victory against Sheriff Tiraspol during the first round. Oleh entered the pitch in the 67th minute, replacing Artem Velenko. He scored his only goal in the tournament on September 19, 2023, in the 90+3rd minute of a 1–4 home defeat against Porto in the first round of Group H. Pushkarov started the match and played the full 90 minutes. In total, he made 14 appearances and scored one goal in the UEFA Youth League.

On July 8, 2024, Pushkarov joined Inhulets Petrove on a one-year loan. He made his debut for the Petrove-based club on August 4, 2024, in a 1–2 away defeat against Zorya Luhansk during the first round of the Ukrainian Premier League. Oleh entered the pitch in the 87th minute, replacing Volodymyr Bilotserkovets. In the 2025–26 season, he played for FC Kudrivka on loan.

On 29 August 2026, he signed with Chornomorets Odesa. As a player for Chornomorets, Pushkarov made his debut against Kryvbas Kryvyi Rih on 30 August 2026.
