= Kyanno Silva =

Dutch footballer (born 2005)

Personal information
- Full name: Kyanno Lorenzo Miranda de Brito e Silva
- Date of birth: 24 May 2005 (age 21)
- Place of birth: Schiedam, Netherlands
- Height: 1.80 m (5 ft 11 in)
- Position: Forward

Team information
- Current team: TOP Oss
- Number: 18

Youth career
- –2017: Feyenoord
- 2017–2021: Sparta Rotterdam
- 2021–2025: Benfica

Senior career*
Years	Team	Apps	(Gls)
2025–2026	Braga B	5	(0)
2026–	TOP Oss	0	(0)

International career^{‡}
2022	Netherlands U18	2	(0)
2023	Netherlands U19	5	(0)
- * Club domestic league appearances and goals as of 00:15 (UTC) 30 December 2025 ‡ National team caps and goals as of 00:15 (UTC) 6 December 2023

Kyanno Lorenzo Miranda de Brito e Silva (born 24 May 2005) is a Dutch professional footballer who plays for Eerste Divisie club TOP Oss. He is a former Netherlands youth international.

== Club career ==
From Schiedam, near Rotterdam in the Nertherlands, he initially trained in the youth team of Feyenoord. He then joined the youth academy of Sparta Rotterdam in 2017. He agreed a three-year contract with Portuguese giants Benfica in 2021. He featured that season for the Benfica U19 side at 16 years-of-age.

In July 2025, he joined Portuguese side S.C. Braga B, signing a three-year contract.

== International career ==
Born in the Netherlands, Silva was born to a Portuguese father and Cape Verdean mother, and is eligible for all three national teams. He has featured for Dutch international youth sides. In November 2023, he had graduated to play for the Netherlands U19 side, appearing as a second-half substitute against Luxembourg U19.

== Style of play ==
He has been described as a left-footed attacker who plays on the right wing.
