= Diego Sia =

Italian footballer (born 2006)

Personal information
- Date of birth: 9 March 2006 (age 20)
- Place of birth: Parabiago, Italy
- Height: 1.70 m (5 ft 7 in)
- Positions: Winger; forward

Team information
- Current team: Dolomiti Bellunesi
- Number: 11

Youth career
- Parabiago
- –2025: AC Milan

Senior career*
Years	Team	Apps	(Gls)
2024–2026	AC Milan	0	(0)
2024–2026	Milan Futuro (res.)	44	(4)
2026	→ Mirandés (loan)	7	(0)
2026–	Dolomiti Bellunesi	12	(2)

International career^{‡}
2022	Italy U16	1	(0)
2024	Italy U18	1	(0)
2024–2025	Italy U19	11	(3)
- * Club domestic league appearances and goals as of 23:45, 7 November 2026 (UTC) ‡ National team caps and goals as of 23:45, 15 January 2025 (UTC)

Diego Sia (born 9 March 2006) is an Italian professional footballer who plays as a winger and forward Serie C Group A club Dolomiti Bellunesi. He is an Italian youth international.

== Club career ==
=== AC Milan ===
Sia was born in Parabiago, Italy, and joined the youth academy of Serie A club AC Milan as a child.

He received his first call-up with the senior team by head coach Stefano Pioli on 5 May 2024, during a 3–3 home draw Serie A match against Genoa, as an unused substitute however.

Sia made his professional debut with the newly created reserve team Milan Futuro on 10 August 2024, starting the game during a 3–0 away win Coppa Italia Serie C first round match against Lecco. He scored his first professional goal with Milan Futuro on 27 November 2024, starting the game during a 1–0 away win Coppa Italia Serie C round of 16 match against Torres.

==== Loan to Mirandés ====
On 2 February 2026, Sia moved to Spain and joined Segunda División club Mirandés, on a six-month loan until the end of the 2025–26 season. He made his debut with the club during a 1–0 home loss Segunda División match against Ceuta, on 1 March 2026.

=== Dolomiti Bellunesi ===
On 28 August 2026, Sia moved to Serie C club Dolomiti Bellunesi on a permanent transfer, ahead of the 2026–27 season.

== International career ==
Sia has represented Italy at under-16, under-18 and under-19 levels.

== Career statistics ==
As of match played 10 May 2026

Appearances and goals by club, season and competition
Club	Season	League			Cup		Continental		Other		Total	
Club	Season	Division	Apps	Goals	Apps	Goals	Apps	Goals	Apps	Goals	Apps	Goals
AC Milan	2023–24	Serie A	0	0	—		—		—		0	0
AC Milan	Total		0	0	—		—		—		0	0
Milan Futuro	2024–25	Serie C	27	0	4 (Note: Appearances in Coppa Italia Serie C)	1	—		2 (Note: Appearances in Serie C play-out)	0	33	1
Milan Futuro	2025–26	Serie D	17	4	3 (Note: Appearances in Coppa Italia Serie D)	0	—		0	0	20	4
Milan Futuro	Total		44	4	7	1	—		2	0	53	5
Mirandés (loan)	2025–26	Segunda División	7	0	—		—		0	0	7	0
Mirandés (loan)	Total		7	0	—		—		0	0	7	0
Career total			51	4	7	1	0	0	2	0	60	5
