= Serif Nhaga =

Footballer (born 2005)

Personal information
- Date of birth: 1 September 2005 (age 21)
- Place of birth: Bissau, Guinea-Bissau
- Height: 1.70 m (5 ft 7 in)
- Position: Left-back

Team information
- Current team: Leixões
- Number: 30

Youth career
- 2019–2023: Porto
- 2023–2025: Paris Saint-Germain
- 2025: Sampdoria

Senior career*
Years	Team	Apps	(Gls)
2025–	Leixões	21	(2)
- * Club domestic league appearances and goals as of 19 June 2026

Serif Nhaga (born 1 September 2005) is a professional footballer who plays as a left-back for Liga Portugal 2 club Leixões. Born in Guinea-Bissau, he has previously been called up to represent Portugal at youth international level.

== Club career ==
A member of the Porto academy since 2019, Nhaga joined the Paris Saint-Germain Youth Academy in January 2023, after he refused to sign his first professional contract with the Portuguese club. He joined the club on a contract until 2025, and was initially assigned to the under-19 squad. Nhaga was first selected by first team manager Christophe Galtier in the match day squad on 21 April 2023, for a Ligue 1 game against Angers, where he appeared on the bench.

On 31 January 2025, Nhaga signed for Serie B club Sampdoria on a contract until June 2028. On 21 July 2025, he signed for Liga Portugal 2 club Leixões.

== International career ==
Born in Guinea-Bissau, Nhaga holds Portuguese nationality and has been called up to Portuguese youth national teams.

== Style of play ==
An offensive-minded left-back with remarkable physical abilities, Nhaga's style of play very soon earned him comparisons to his PSG teammate Nuno Mendes. PSG manager Christophe Galtier described Nhaga as a "left-footed, very explosive, powerful [player], with good technical abilities".

== Honours ==
Paris Saint-Germain U19

- Championnat National U19: 2023–24
