= Yannick Eduardo =

Czech footballer (born 2006)

Personal information
- Full name: Yannick Ferreira Eduardo
- Date of birth: 23 January 2006 (age 20)
- Place of birth: Kadaň, Czech Republic
- Height: 1.93 m (6 ft 4 in)
- Position: Striker

Team information
- Current team: ADO Den Haag (on loan from TSG Hoffenheim)
- Number: 46

Youth career
- –2020: Theole
- 2020–2022: NEC
- 2022–2024: RB Leipzig

Senior career*
Years	Team	Apps	(Gls)
2024–2026	RB Leipzig	0	(0)
2024–2025	→ De Graafschap (loan)	10	(1)
2025	→ Emmen (loan)	17	(1)
2025–2026	→ Dordrecht (loan)	22	(12)
2026–	TSG Hoffenheim	1	(0)
2026–	TSG Hoffenheim II	11	(1)
2026–	→ ADO Den Haag (loan)	10	(3)

International career^{‡}
2022	Netherlands U17	3	(1)
2022–2024	Netherlands U18	4	(1)
2024	Czech Republic U19	3	(0)
2025–	Czech Republic U21	7	(2)
- * Club domestic league appearances and goals as of 24 October 2026 ‡ National team caps and goals as of 31 March 2026

Yannick Ferreira Eduardo (born 23 January 2006) is a Czech professional footballer who plays as a striker for Eredivisie club ADO Den Haag, on loan from Bundesliga club TSG Hoffenheim. He represented Netherlands internationally as a junior, before switching allegiance back to the Czech Republic.

== Early life ==
Born in Kadaň, Czech Republic, to an Angolan father and a Czech mother, Eduardo moved from the Czech Republic to Tiel, in the Netherlands at the age of three.

== Career ==
As a youth player, Eduardo joined the academy of Bundesliga side RB Leipzig, where was regarded as one of the club's most important players. On 23 January 2024, he signed his first professional contract with Leipzig, keeping him at the club until 2027.

On 27 June 2024, Eduardo joined Eerste Divisie club De Graafschap on season-long loan. He made his professional debut on 11 August, replacing Ralf Seuntjens in the 64th minute of a 4–3 home victory against Volendam on the first matchday of the season. On 13 September, he scored his first professional goal, an injury-time consolation in a 3–2 league loss to Helmond Sport. On 9 January 2025, Eduardo moved on a new loan to Emmen, in the same league. On 17 July 2025, Eduardo returned to the Netherlands on loan once more, this time to Dordrecht.

On 2 February 2026, Eduardo joined TSG Hoffenheim, after Dordrecht exercised their option to buy in the loan contract.

On 20 July 2026, Eduardo joined ADO Den Haag on loan for the 2026–27 season.

== Style of play ==
Early in his career, Eduardo was described as a striker with "promising talent". Known for his goalscoring ability, aerial strength, strong physique, good pace, and skillful left foot, he excelled in RB Leipzig's youth academy.

== Career statistics ==
As of match played 24 October 2026

Appearances and goals by club, season and competition
Club	Season	League			National cup (Note: Includes KNVB Cup)		Europe		Other		Total	
Club	Season	Division	Apps	Goals	Apps	Goals	Apps	Goals	Apps	Goals	Apps	Goals
RB Leipzig	2024–25	Bundesliga	0	0	0	0	0	0	—		0	0
De Graafschap (loan)	2024–25	Eerste Divisie	10	1	1	1	—		—		11	2
FC Emmen (loan)	2024–25	Eerste Divisie	17	1	—		—		—		17	1
Dordrecht (loan)	2025–26	Eerste Divisie	22	12	1	0	—		—		23	12
TSG Hoffenheim II	2025–26	3. Liga	11	0	—		—		—		11	0
TSG Hoffenheim	2025–26	Bundesliga	1	0	—		—		—		1	0
ADO Den Haag (loan)	2026–27	Eredivisie	10	3	1	0	—		—		11	3
Career total			71	17	3	1	0	0	0	0	74	18
