= Anhá Candé =

Bissau-Guinean footballer (born 2007)

Personal information
- Date of birth: 13 August 2007 (age 19)
- Place of birth: Bissau, Guinea-Bissau
- Height: 1.86 m (6 ft 1 in)
- Position: Forward

Team information
- Current team: Porto B
- Number: 95

Youth career
- 2021–2022: Real S.C.
- 2022–2023: Porto

Senior career*
Years	Team	Apps	(Gls)
2023–	Porto B	50	(5)
- * Club domestic league appearances and goals as of 19 June 2026

Anhá Candé (born 13 August 2007) is a Bissau-Guinean footballer who plays as a forward for Liga Portugal 2 club Porto B.

== Career ==
As a youth player, Candé joined the youth academy of Portuguese side Porto, where he was regarded as one of the club's most important players.

== Style of play ==
He mainly operates as a striker and has received comparisons to Belgium international Romelu Lukaku.

== Personal life ==
He is a native of Queluz, Portugal.
