= 2023–24 in Spanish football =

Football in Spain
- Season: 2023–24

Men's football
- La Liga: Real Madrid
- Segunda División: Leganés
- Primera Federación: Deportivo La Coruña
- Copa del Rey: Athletic Bilbao
- Supercopa: Real Madrid

Women's football
- Liga F: Barcelona
- Copa de la Reina: Barcelona
- Supercopa: Barcelona

The 2023–24 season was the 122nd season of competitive association football in Spain.

== National team ==
=== Spain national football team ===
==== Friendlies ====
22 March 2024	Spain	0–1	Colombia	London, England
20:30 GMT (UTC±00:00)		Report	Muñoz 61'	Stadium: London Stadium; Attendance: 44,000; Referee: Michael Oliver (England)

25 March 2024	Spain	3–3	Brazil	Madrid
21:30 CET (UTC+01:00)	Rodri 12' (pen.), 87' (pen.); Olmo 36'	Report	Rodrygo 40'; Endrick 50'; Paquetá 90+6' (pen.)	Stadium: Santiago Bernabéu; Attendance: 65,000; Referee: João Pinheiro (Portugal)

5 June 2024	Spain	5–0	Andorra	Badajoz
21:30 CET (UTC+01:00)	Pérez 24'; Oyarzabal 53', 66', 73'; F. Torres 81'	Report		Stadium: Nuevo Vivero; Referee: Gustavo Correia (Portugal)

8 June 2024	Spain	5–1	Northern Ireland	Palma
21:30 CET (UTC+01:00)	Pedri 12', 29'; Morata 18'; Fabián 35'; Oyarzabal 60'	Report	Ballard 2'	Stadium: Estadi Mallorca Son Moix; Referee: Bastien Dechepy (France)

==== UEFA Euro 2024 qualifying ====
===== Group A =====
Pos	Team	Pld	W	D	L	GF	GA	GD	Pts	Qualification	(Spain)	(Scotland)	(Norway)	(Georgia (country))	(Cyprus)
1	Spain	8	7	0	1	25	5	+20	21	Qualify for final tournament	—	2–0	3–0	3–1	6–0
2	Scotland	8	5	2	1	17	8	+9	17	Qualify for final tournament	2–0	—	3–3	2–0	3–0
3	Norway	8	3	2	3	14	12	+2	11		0–1	1–2	—	2–1	3–1
4	Georgia	8	2	2	4	12	18	−6	8	Advance to play-offs via Nations League	1–7	2–2	1–1	—	4–0
5	Cyprus	8	0	0	8	3	28	−25	0		1–3	0–3	0–4	1–2	—

Source: UEFA
Rules for classification: Qualification tiebreakers

8 September 2023	Georgia	1–7	Spain	Tbilisi, Georgia
18:00 CEST (UTC+02:00)	Chakvetadze 49'	Report	Morata 22', 40', 66'; Kvirkvelia 28' (o.g.); Olmo 38'; Williams 68'; Yamal 74'	Stadium: Boris Paichadze Dinamo Arena; Attendance: 51,694; Referee: Daniel Siebert (Germany)

11 September 2023	Spain	6–0	Cyprus	Granada
20:45 CEST (UTC+02:00)	Gavi 18'; Merino 33'; Joselu 70'; F. Torres 73', 83'; Baena 77'	Report		Stadium: Nuevo Los Cármenes; Attendance: 17,311; Referee: Simone Sozza (Italia)

12 October 2023	Spain	2–0	Scotland	Seville
20:45 CEST (UTC+02:00)	Morata 73'; Sancet 86'	Report		Stadium: La Cartuja; Attendance: 45,623; Referee: Serdar Gözübüyük (Netherlands)

15 October 2023	Norway	0–1	Spain	Oslo, Norway
20:45 CEST (UTC+02:00)		Report	Gavi 49'	Stadium: Ullevaal Stadion; Attendance: 25,885; Referee: Tobias Stieler (Germany)

16 November 2023	Cyprus	1–3	Spain	Limassol, Cyprus
20:45 CET (UTC+01:00)	Pileas 75'	Report	Yamal 5'; Oyarzabal 22'; Joselu 28'	Stadium: Alphamega Stadium; Attendance: 9,667; Referee: Mykola Balakin (Ukraine)

19 November 2023	Spain	3–1	Georgia	Valladolid
20:45 CET (UTC+01:00)	Le Normand 4'; F. Torres 55'; Lochoshvili 72' (o.g.)	Report	Kvaratskhelia 10'	Stadium: José Zorrilla; Attendance: 24,146; Referee: Ovidiu Hațegan (Romania)

==== UEFA Euro 2024 ====
===== Group B =====
Pos	Team	Pld	W	D	L	GF	GA	GD	Pts	Qualification
1	Spain	3	3	0	0	5	0	+5	9	Advance to knockout stage
2	Italy	3	1	1	1	3	3	0	4	Advance to knockout stage
3	Croatia	3	0	2	1	3	6	−3	2	
4	Albania	3	0	1	2	3	5	−2	1	

Source: UEFA

15 June 2024	Spain	3–0	Croatia	Berlin, Germany
18:00	Morata 29'; Fabián 32'; Carvajal 45+2'	Report		Stadium: Olympiastadion; Attendance: 68,844; Referee: Michael Oliver (England)

20 June 2024	Spain	1–0	Italy	Gelsenkirchen, Germany
21:00	Calafiori 55' (o.g.)	Report		Stadium: Arena AufSchalke; Attendance: 49,528; Referee: Slavko Vinčić (Slovenia)

24 June 2024	Albania	0–1	Spain	Düsseldorf, Germany
21:00		Report	F. Torres 13'	Stadium: Merkur Spiel-Arena; Attendance: 46,586; Referee: Glenn Nyberg (Sweden)

===== Knockout stage =====
30 June 2024 R16	Spain	4–1	Georgia	Cologne, Germany
21:00	Rodri 39'; Fabián 51'; Williams 75'; Olmo 83'		Le Normand 18' (o.g.)	Stadium: RheinEnergieStadion; Attendance: 42,233; Referee: François Letexier (France)

5 July 2024 QF	Spain	2–1 (a.e.t.)	Germany	Stuttgart, Germany
18:00	Olmo 51'; Merino 119'	Report	Wirtz 89'	Stadium: MHPArena; Attendance: 54,000; Referee: Anthony Taylor (England)

9 July 2024 SF	Spain	2–1	France	Munich, Germany
21:00	Yamal 21'; Olmo 25'	Report	Kolo Muani 9'	Stadium: Allianz Arena; Attendance: 62,042; Referee: Slavko Vinčić (Slovenia)

14 July 2024 Final	Spain	2–1	England	Berlin, Germany
21:00	Williams 47'; Oyarzabal 86'	Report	Palmer 73'	Stadium: Olympiastadion; Attendance: 65,600; Referee: François Letexier (France)

=== U–17 ===
==== FIFA U-17 World Cup ====
===== Group B =====
Pos	Team	Pld	W	D	L	GF	GA	GD	Pts	Qualification
1	Spain	3	2	1	0	5	2	+3	7	Knockout stage
2	Mali	3	2	0	1	8	2	+6	6	Knockout stage
3	Uzbekistan	3	1	1	1	5	5	0	4	Knockout stage
4	Canada	3	0	0	3	1	10	−9	0	

Source: FIFA

10 November 2023	Spain	2–0	Canada	Surakarta, Indonesia
19:00	Guiu 21'; Junyent 76'	Report		Stadium: Manahan Stadium; Attendance: 6,613; Referee: Roberto Pérez (Peru)

13 November 2023	Spain	1–0	Mali	Surakarta, Indonesia
16:00	Hernández 62'	Report		Stadium: Manahan Stadium; Attendance: 4,723; Referee: Bryan López (Guatemala)

16 November 2023	Uzbekistan	2–2	Spain	Surakarta, Indonesia
16:00	Shukurullayev 45+4'; Saidov 54'	Report	Oyono 10'; Martín 19'	Stadium: Manahan Stadium; Attendance: 5,554; Referee: Augusto Aragón (Ecuador)

===== Knockout stage =====
20 November 2023 R16	Spain	2–1	Japan	Surakarta, Indonesia
	Junyent 8'; Guiu 74'	Report	Nawata 40'	Stadium: Manahan Stadium; Attendance: 8,587; Referee: Pierre Atcho (Gabon)

24 November 2023 QF	Spain	0–1	Germany	Jakarta, Indonesia
15:30		Report	Brunner 64' (pen.)	Stadium: Jakarta International Stadium; Attendance: 8,379; Referee: Omar Al Ali (United Arab Emirates)

=== Spain women's national football team ===
==== Friendlies ====
5 July 2023	Denmark	0–2	Spain	Gladsaxe, Denmark
18:00		Report	Battle 7'; Paralluelo 53'	Stadium: Gladsaxe Stadium; Attendance: 2,223; Referee: Maral Mirzai Beni (Sweden)

14 July 2023	Vietnam	0–9	Spain	Auckland, New Zealand
12:30		Report	Redondo 7'; Del Castillo 12'; Paralluelo 51', 88'; González 60', 65'; Hermoso 63', 83'; Bonmatí 71'	Stadium: McLennan Park; Attendance: 0 Referee: (New Zealand)
Note: Unofficial friendly

==== 2023 FIFA Women's World Cup ====
===== Group C =====
Pos	Team	Pld	W	D	L	GF	GA	GD	Pts	Qualification
1	Japan	3	3	0	0	11	0	+11	9	Advance to knockout stage
2	Spain	3	2	0	1	8	4	+4	6	Advance to knockout stage
3	Zambia	3	1	0	2	3	11	−8	3	
4	Costa Rica	3	0	0	3	1	8	−7	0	

Source: FIFA
Rules for classification: Group stage tiebreakers

21 July 2023	Spain	3–0	Costa Rica	Wellington, New Zealand
19:30	Del Campo 21' (o.g.); Bonmatí 23'; González 27'	Report		Stadium: Wellington Regional Stadium; Attendance: 22,966; Referee: Casey Reibelt (Australia)

26 July 2023	Spain	5–0	Zambia	Auckland, New Zealand
19:30	Abelleira 9'; Hermoso 13', 70'; Redondo 69', 85'	Report		Stadium: Eden Park; Attendance: 20,983; Referee: Oh Hyeon-jeong (South Korea)

31 July 2023	Japan	4–0	Spain	Wellington, New Zealand
19:00	Miyazawa 12', 40'; Ueki 29'; Mi. Tanaka 82'	Report		Stadium: Wellington Regional Stadium; Attendance: 20,957; Referee: Ekaterina Koroleva (United States)

===== Knockout stage =====
5 August 2023 R16	Switzerland	1–5	Spain	Auckland, New Zealand
17:00	Codina 11' (o.g.)	Report	Bonmatí 5', 36'; Redondo 17'; Codina 45'; Hermoso 70'	Stadium: Eden Park; Attendance: 43,217; Referee: Cheryl Foster (Wales)

11 August 2023 QF	Spain	2–1 (a.e.t.)	Netherlands	Wellington, New Zealand
13:00	Caldentey 81' (pen.); Paralluelo 111'	Report	Van der Gragt 90+1'	Stadium: Wellington Regional Stadium; Attendance: 32,021; Referee: Stéphanie Frappart (France)

15 August 2023 SF	Spain	2–1	Sweden	Auckland, New Zealand
20:00	Paralluelo 81'; Carmona 89'	Report	Blomqvist 88'	Stadium: Eden Park; Attendance: 43,217; Referee: Edina Alves Batista (Brazil)

20 August 2023 Final	Spain	1–0	England	Sydney, Australia
20:00	Carmona 29'	Report		Stadium: Stadium Australia; Attendance: 75,784; Referee: Tori Penso (United States)

==== 2023–24 UEFA Women's Nations League ====
===== Group A4 =====
Pos	Team	Pld	W	D	L	GF	GA	GD	Pts	Qualification or relegation	(Spain)	(Italy)	(Sweden)	(Switzerland)
1	Spain	6	5	0	1	23	9	+14	15	Qualification for Nations League Finals	—	2–3	5–3	5–0
2	Italy	6	3	1	2	8	5	+3	10		0–1	—	0–1	3–0
3	Sweden (O)	6	2	1	3	8	10	−2	7	Qualification for relegation play-offs	2–3	1–1	—	1–0
4	Switzerland (R)	6	1	0	5	2	17	−15	3	Relegation to League B	1–7	0–1	1–0	—

Source: UEFA
Rules for classification: Tiebreakers
(O) Play-off winners; (R) Relegated

22 September 2023	Sweden	2–3	Spain	Gothenburg, Sweden
18:30	Eriksson 23'; Hurtig 82'	Report	Del Castillo 37'; Navarro 77'; Caldentey 90+6' (pen.)	Stadium: Gamla Ullevi; Attendance: 16,114; Referee: Rebecca Welch (England)

26 September 2023	Spain	5–0	Switzerland	Córdoba
21:00	L. García 15'; Bonmatí 45+1', 49'; Gabarro 57'; Oroz 87'	Report		Stadium: Estadio Nuevo Arcángel; Attendance: 14,194; Referee: Monika Mularczyk (Poland)

27 October 2023	Italy	0–1	Spain	Salerno, Italy
17:45		Report	Hermoso 89'	Stadium: Stadio Arechi; Attendance: 4,694; Referee: Alina Peşu (Romania)

31 October 2023	Switzerland	1–7	Spain	Zürich, Switzerland
19:00	Pilgrim 69'	Report	Hernández 4'; Putellas 11', 62' (pen.); Méndez 56'; Del Castillo 72', 89'; Oroz 90+3'	Stadium: Letzigrund; Attendance: 8,515; Referee: Iuliana Demetrescu (Romania)

1 December 2023	Spain	2–3	Italy	Pontevedra
21:30	Del Castillo 12'; González 76'	Report	Giacinti 46'; Cambiaghi 57'; Linari 64'	Stadium: Estadio Municipal de Pasarón; Attendance: 9,212; Referee: Eleni Antoniou (Greece)

5 December 2023	Spain	5–3	Sweden	Málaga
19:00	Paralluelo 11'; Del Castillo 51'; Caldentey 78', 89'; Fiamma 81'	Report	Zigiotti Olme 1'; Asllani 14'; Blackstenius 29'	Stadium: La Rosaleda; Attendance: 15,896; Referee: Kateryna Monzul (Ukraine)

===== Nations League Finals =====
23 February 2024 SF	Spain	3–0	Netherlands	Seville
21:00	Hermoso 41'; Bonmatí 45'; Batlle 77'	Report		Stadium: La Cartuja; Attendance: 21,856; Referee: Rebecca Welch (England)

28 February 2024 Final	Spain	2–0	France	Seville
19:00	Bonmatí 32'; Caldentey 53'	Report		Stadium: La Cartuja; Attendance: 32,657; Referee: Tess Olofsson (Sweden)

==== UEFA Women's Euro 2025 qualifying ====
===== Group A2 =====
Pos	Team	Pld	W	D	L	GF	GA	GD	Pts	Qualification	(Spain)	(Denmark)	(Belgium)	(Czech Republic)
1	Spain	6	5	0	1	18	5	+13	15	Qualify for final tournament	—	3–2	2–0	3–1
2	Denmark	6	4	0	2	14	8	+6	12	Qualify for final tournament	0–2	—	4–2	2–0
3	Belgium	6	1	1	4	5	18	−13	4 (Note: Head-to-head points: Belgium 4, Czech Republic 1.)	Advance to play-offs (seeded)	0–7	0–3	—	1–1
4	Czech Republic (R)	6	1	1	4	6	12	−6	4	Advance to play-offs (seeded) and relegation to League B	2–1	1–3	1–2	—

Source: UEFA
Rules for classification: Tiebreakers
(R) Relegated
Notes:

5 April 2024	Belgium	0–7	Spain	Leuven
20:45		Report	Paralluelo 8', 30', 47'; Hermoso 16'; Esther 64', 90'; S. García 85'	Stadium: Den Dreef; Attendance: 7,123; Referee: Katalin Kulcsár (Hungary)

9 April 2024	Spain	3–1	Czech Republic	Burgos
19:00	Méndez 58'; Hermoso 62'; Caldentey 70'	Report	Sonntágová 56'	Stadium: El Plantío; Attendance: 9,982; Referee: Jelena Cvetković (Serbia)

31 May 2024	Denmark	0–2	Spain	Vejle
19:00		Report	Hermoso 17'; Caldentey 28' (pen.)	Stadium: Vejle Stadium; Attendance: 6,014; Referee: Ivana Projkovska (North Macedonia)

4 June 2024	Spain	3–2	Denmark	Santa Cruz de Tenerife
21:30	Vilamala 74'; Paredes 76'; L. García 90+2'	Report	Thomsen 8', 72'	Stadium: Heliodoro Rodríguez López; Attendance: 17,532; Referee: Maria Sole Ferrieri Caputi (Italy)

== UEFA competitions ==
=== UEFA Super Cup ===
16 August 2023
22:00 UTC+3

Manchester City (The Football Association)	1–1	(Royal Spanish Football Federation) Sevilla
Palmer 63'	Report	En-Nesyri 25'
Penalties
Haaland (penalty scored); Álvarez (penalty scored); Kovačić (penalty scored); Grealish (penalty scored); Walker (penalty scored)	5–4	(penalty scored) Ocampos; (penalty scored) Mir; (penalty scored) Rakitić; (penalty scored) Montiel; (penalty missed) Gudelj

Karaiskakis Stadium, Piraeus
Attendance: 29,207
Referee: François Letexier (France)

=== UEFA Champions League ===
==== Group stage ====
===== Group B =====
Pos	Team	Pld	W	D	L	GF	GA	GD	Pts	Qualification	ARS	PSV	LEN	SEV
1	(England) Arsenal	6	4	1	1	16	4	+12	13	Advance to knockout phase	—	4–0	6–0	2–0
2	(Netherlands) PSV Eindhoven	6	2	3	1	8	10	−2	9	Advance to knockout phase	1–1	—	1–0	2–2
3	(France) Lens	6	2	2	2	6	11	−5	8	Transfer to Europa League	2–1	1–1	—	2–1
4	(Spain) Sevilla	6	0	2	4	7	12	−5	2		1–2	2–3	1–1	—

Source: UEFA

===== Group C =====
Pos	Team	Pld	W	D	L	GF	GA	GD	Pts	Qualification	RMA	NAP	BRA	UNB
1	(Spain) Real Madrid	6	6	0	0	16	7	+9	18	Advance to knockout phase	—	4–2	3–0	1–0
2	(Italy) Napoli	6	3	1	2	10	9	+1	10	Advance to knockout phase	2–3	—	2–0	1–1
3	(Portugal) Braga	6	1	1	4	6	12	−6	4	Transfer to Europa League	1–2	1–2	—	1–1
4	(Germany) Union Berlin	6	0	2	4	6	10	−4	2		2–3	0–1	2–3	—

Source: UEFA

===== Group D =====
Pos	Team	Pld	W	D	L	GF	GA	GD	Pts	Qualification	RSO	INT	BEN	SAL
1	(Spain) Real Sociedad	6	3	3	0	7	2	+5	12 (Note: Tied on head-to-head points, goal difference, and goals scored. Goal difference in all matches: Real Sociedad +5, Inter Milan +3.)	Advance to knockout phase	—	1–1	3–1	0–0
2	(Italy) Inter Milan	6	3	3	0	8	5	+3	12	Advance to knockout phase	0–0	—	1–0	2–1
3	(Portugal) Benfica	6	1	1	4	7	11	−4	4 (Note: Tied on head-to-head points, goal difference, goals scored, and goal difference in all matches. Goals scored in all matches: Benfica 7, Red Bull Salzburg 4.)	Transfer to Europa League	0–1	3–3	—	0–2
4	(Austria) Red Bull Salzburg	6	1	1	4	4	8	−4	4		0–2	0–1	1–3	—

Source: UEFA

===== Group E =====
Pos	Team	Pld	W	D	L	GF	GA	GD	Pts	Qualification	ATM	LAZ	FEY	CEL
1	(Spain) Atlético Madrid	6	4	2	0	17	6	+11	14	Advance to knockout phase	—	2–0	3–2	6–0
2	(Italy) Lazio	6	3	1	2	7	7	0	10	Advance to knockout phase	1–1	—	1–0	2–0
3	(Netherlands) Feyenoord	6	2	0	4	9	10	−1	6	Transfer to Europa League	1–3	3–1	—	2–0
4	(Scotland) Celtic	6	1	1	4	5	15	−10	4		2–2	1–2	2–1	—

Source: UEFA

===== Group H =====
Pos	Team	Pld	W	D	L	GF	GA	GD	Pts	Qualification	BAR	POR	SHK	ANT
1	(Spain) Barcelona	6	4	0	2	12	6	+6	12 (Note: Head-to-head points: Barcelona 6, Porto 0.)	Advance to knockout phase	—	2–1	2–1	5–0
2	(Portugal) Porto	6	4	0	2	15	8	+7	12	Advance to knockout phase	0–1	—	5–3	2–0
3	(Ukraine) Shakhtar Donetsk	6	3	0	3	10	12	−2	9	Transfer to Europa League	1–0	1–3	—	1–0
4	(Belgium) Antwerp	6	1	0	5	6	17	−11	3		3–2	1–4	2–3	—

Source: UEFA

==== Knockout phase ====
===== Round of 16 =====
Team 1	Agg.	Team 2	1st leg	2nd leg
Napoli (Italy)	2–4	(Spain) Barcelona	1–1	1–3
Paris Saint-Germain (France)	4–1	(Spain) Real Sociedad	2–0	2–1
Inter Milan (Italy)	2–2 (2–3 p)	(Spain) Atlético Madrid	1–0	1–2 (a.e.t.)
RB Leipzig (Germany)	1–2	(Spain) Real Madrid	0–1	1–1

===== Quarter-finals =====
Team 1	Agg.	Team 2	1st leg	2nd leg
Atlético Madrid (Spain)	4–5	(Germany) Borussia Dortmund	2–1	2–4
Real Madrid (Spain)	4–4 (4–3 p)	(England) Manchester City	3–3	1–1 (a.e.t.)
Paris Saint-Germain (France)	6–4	(Spain) Barcelona	2–3	4–1

===== Semi-finals =====
Team 1	Agg.	Team 2	1st leg	2nd leg
Bayern Munich (Germany)	3–4	(Spain) Real Madrid	2–2	1–2

===== Final =====
1 June 2024
20:00 UTC+1

Borussia Dortmund (Germany)	0–2	(Spain) Real Madrid
	Report	Carvajal 74'; Vinícius 83'

Wembley Stadium, London
Attendance: 86,212
Referee: Slavko Vinčić (Slovenia)

=== UEFA Europa League ===
==== Group stage ====
===== Group C =====
Pos	Team	Pld	W	D	L	GF	GA	GD	Pts	Qualification	RAN	SPP	BET	ALI
1	(Scotland) Rangers	6	3	2	1	8	6	+2	11	Advance to round of 16	—	2–1	1–0	1–1
2	(Czech Republic) Sparta Prague	6	3	1	2	9	7	+2	10	Advance to knockout round play-offs	0–0	—	1–0	3–2
3	(Spain) Real Betis	6	3	0	3	9	7	+2	9	Transfer to Europa Conference League	2–3	2–1	—	4–1
4	(Cyprus) Aris Limassol	6	1	1	4	7	13	−6	4		2–1	1–3	0–1	—

Source: UEFA

===== Group F =====
Pos	Team	Pld	W	D	L	GF	GA	GD	Pts	Qualification	VIL	REN	MHA	PAO
1	(Spain) Villarreal	6	4	1	1	9	7	+2	13	Advance to round of 16	—	1–0	0–0	3–2
2	(France) Rennes	6	4	0	2	13	6	+7	12	Advance to knockout round play-offs	2–3	—	3–0	3–1
3	(Israel) Maccabi Haifa	6	1	2	3	3	9	−6	5	Transfer to Europa Conference League	1–2	0–3	—	0–0
4	(Greece) Panathinaikos	6	1	1	4	7	10	−3	4		2–0	1–2	1–2	—

Source: UEFA

==== Knockout phase ====
===== Round of 16 =====
Team 1	Agg.	Team 2	1st leg	2nd leg
Marseille (France)	5–3	(Spain) Villarreal	4–0	1–3

=== UEFA Europa Conference League ===
==== Qualifying phase and play-off round ====
===== Play-off round =====
====== Knockout round play-offs ======
Team 1	Agg.	Team 2	1st leg	2nd leg
Osasuna (Spain)	3–4	(Belgium) Club Brugge	1–2	2–2

==== Knockout phase ====
===== Knockout round play-offs =====
Team 1	Agg.	Team 2	1st leg	2nd leg
Real Betis (Spain)	1–2	(Croatia) Dinamo Zagreb	0–1	1–1

=== UEFA Women's Champions League ===
==== Qualifying rounds ====
===== Round 1 =====
====== Semi-finals ======
Team 1	Score	Team 2
Levante (Spain)	4–0	(Austria) Sturm Graz

====== Final ======
Team 1	Score	Team 2
Levante (Spain)	2–3	(Netherlands) Twente

===== Round 2 =====
Team 1	Agg.	Team 2	1st leg	2nd leg
Real Madrid (Spain)	5–1	(Norway) Vålerenga	2–1	3–0

==== Group stage ====
===== Group A =====
Pos	Team	Pld	W	D	L	GF	GA	GD	Pts	Qualification	BAR	BEN	FRA	ROS
1	(Spain) Barcelona	6	5	1	0	27	5	+22	16	Advance to quarter-finals	—	5–0	2–0	7–0
2	(Portugal) Benfica	6	2	3	1	9	12	−3	9	Advance to quarter-finals	4–4	—	1–0	1–0
3	(Germany) Eintracht Frankfurt	6	2	1	3	9	8	+1	7		1–3	1–1	—	5–0
4	(Sweden) Rosengård	6	0	1	5	3	23	−20	1		0–6	2–2	1–2	—

Source: UEFA
Rules for classification: Group stage tiebreakers

===== Group D =====
Pos	Team	Pld	W	D	L	GF	GA	GD	Pts	Qualification	CHE	HAC	PFC	RMA
1	(England) Chelsea	6	4	2	0	15	5	+10	14	Advance to quarter-finals	—	0–0	4–1	2–1
2	(Sweden) BK Häcken	6	3	2	1	6	5	+1	11	Advance to quarter-finals	1–3	—	0–0	2–1
3	(France) Paris FC	6	2	1	3	5	11	−6	7		0–4	1–2	—	2–1
4	(Spain) Real Madrid	6	0	1	5	5	10	−5	1		2–2	0–1	0–1	—

Source: UEFA
Rules for classification: Group stage tiebreakers

==== Knockout phase ====
===== Quarter-finals =====
Team 1	Agg.	Team 2	1st leg	2nd leg
Brann (Norway)	2–5	(Spain) Barcelona	1–2	1–3

===== Semi-finals =====
Team 1	Agg.	Team 2	1st leg	2nd leg
Barcelona (Spain)	2–1	(England) Chelsea	0–1	2–0

===== Final =====
25 May 2024
18:00 UTC+2

Barcelona (Spain)	2–0	(France) Lyon
Bonmatí 63'; Putellas 90+5'	Report

San Mamés Stadium, Bilbao
Attendance: 50,827
Referee: Rebecca Welch (England)

=== UEFA Youth League ===
==== UEFA Champions League Path ====
===== Group stage =====
====== Group B ======
Pos	Team	Pld	W	D	L	GF	GA	GD	Pts	Qualification	LEN	SEV	PSV	ARS
1	(French Football Federation) Lens	6	4	1	1	7	4	+3	13	Round of 16	—	1–1	2–1	1–0
2	(Royal Spanish Football Federation) Sevilla	6	2	3	1	6	5	+1	9	Play-offs	0–1	—	1–0	2–1
3	(Royal Dutch Football Association) PSV Eindhoven	6	2	1	3	7	8	−1	7		2–0	1–1	—	1–3
4	(The Football Association) Arsenal	6	1	1	4	6	9	−3	4		0–2	1–1	1–2	—

Source: UEFA

====== Group C ======
Pos	Team	Pld	W	D	L	GF	GA	GD	Pts	Qualification	RMA	BRA	NAP	UNB
1	(Royal Spanish Football Federation) Real Madrid	6	4	2	0	14	1	+13	14	Round of 16	—	0–0	6–0	2–1
2	(Portuguese Football Federation) Braga	6	3	3	0	8	3	+5	12	Play-offs	0–0	—	1–0	1–0
3	(Italian Football Federation) Napoli	6	1	1	4	4	17	−13	4		0–4	2–2	—	1–0
4	(German Football Association) Union Berlin	6	1	0	5	6	11	−5	3		0–2	1–4	4–1	—

Source: UEFA

====== Group D ======
Pos	Team	Pld	W	D	L	GF	GA	GD	Pts	Qualification	SAL	INT	BEN	RSO
1	(Austrian Football Association) Red Bull Salzburg	6	4	2	0	16	8	+8	14	Round of 16	—	1–1	4–2	5–2
2	(Italian Football Federation) Inter Milan	6	1	4	1	9	9	0	7	Play-offs	2–3	—	1–1	1–0
3	(Portuguese Football Federation) Benfica	6	1	3	2	8	10	−2	6		1–1	1–1	—	2–1
4	(Royal Spanish Football Federation) Real Sociedad	6	1	1	4	8	14	−6	4		0–2	3–3	2–1	—

Source: UEFA

====== Group E ======
Pos	Team	Pld	W	D	L	GF	GA	GD	Pts	Qualification	FEY	ATM	LAZ	CEL
1	(Royal Dutch Football Association) Feyenoord	6	4	1	1	13	7	+6	13	Round of 16	—	0–1	2–2	3–0
2	(Royal Spanish Football Federation) Atlético Madrid	6	4	0	2	10	3	+7	12	Play-offs	1–2	—	0–1	4–0
3	(Italian Football Federation) Lazio	6	1	2	3	5	10	−5	5		1–3	0–2	—	0–2
4	(Scottish Football Association) Celtic	6	1	1	4	5	13	−8	4		2–3	0–2	1–1	—

Source: UEFA

====== Group H ======
Pos	Team	Pld	W	D	L	GF	GA	GD	Pts	Qualification	POR	BAR	SHK	ANT
1	(Portuguese Football Federation) Porto	6	5	0	1	17	5	+12	15 (Note: Head-to-head points: Porto 3, Barcelona 3. Head-to-head goal difference: Porto +2, Barcelona –2.)	Round of 16	—	0–2	2–0	3–1
2	(Royal Spanish Football Federation) Barcelona	6	5	0	1	12	5	+7	15	Play-offs	0–4	—	2–0	2–1
3	(Ukrainian Association of Football) Shakhtar Donetsk	6	2	0	4	6	13	−7	6		1–4	0–3	—	3–1
4	(Royal Belgian Football Association) Antwerp	6	0	0	6	5	17	−12	0		1–4	0–3	1–2	—

Source: UEFA

==== Knockout phase ====
===== Play-offs =====
Team 1	Score	Team 2
Nantes (France)	3–3 (3–2 p)	(Spain) Sevilla
Mainz 05 (Germany)	2–2 (6–5 p)	(Spain) Barcelona
AZ (Netherlands)	1–0	(Spain) Atlético Madrid

===== Round of 16 =====
Team 1	Score	Team 2
Real Madrid (Spain)	2–0	(Germany) RB Leipzig

===== Quarter-finals =====
Team 1	Score	Team 2
Milan (Italy)	1–1 (4–3 p)	(Spain) Real Madrid

== Men's football ==
=== League season ===
==== La Liga ====
Pos	Team	Pld	W	D	L	GF	GA	GD	Pts	Qualification or relegation
1	Real Madrid (C)	38	29	8	1	87	26	+61	95	Qualification for the Champions League league phase
2	Barcelona	38	26	7	5	79	44	+35	85	Qualification for the Champions League league phase
3	Girona	38	25	6	7	85	46	+39	81	Qualification for the Champions League league phase
4	Atlético Madrid	38	24	4	10	70	43	+27	76	Qualification for the Champions League league phase
5	Athletic Bilbao	38	19	11	8	61	37	+24	68	Qualification for the Europa League league phase (Note: Since the winners of the 2023–24 Copa del Rey, Athletic Bilbao, qualified for European competition based on league position, the Europa League berth awarded to the Copa del Rey winners was passed to the sixth-placed team, and the Conference League berth awarded to the sixth-placed team was passed to the seventh-placed team.)
6	Real Sociedad	38	16	12	10	51	39	+12	60	Qualification for the Europa League league phase
7	Real Betis	38	14	15	9	48	45	+3	57	Qualification for the Conference League play-off round
8	Villarreal	38	14	11	13	65	65	0	53	
9	Valencia	38	13	10	15	40	45	−5	49	
10	Alavés	38	12	10	16	36	46	−10	46	
11	Osasuna	38	12	9	17	45	56	−11	45	
12	Getafe	38	10	13	15	42	54	−12	43	
13	Celta Vigo	38	10	11	17	46	57	−11	41 (Note: Celta Vigo finished ahead of Sevilla on head-to-head points: Celta Vigo 1–1 Sevilla, Sevilla 1–2 Celta Vigo.)	
14	Sevilla	38	10	11	17	48	54	−6	41	
15	Mallorca	38	8	16	14	33	44	−11	40 (Note: Mallorca finished ahead of Las Palmas on head-to-head points: Las Palmas 1–1 Mallorca, Mallorca 1–0 Las Palmas.)	
16	Las Palmas	38	10	10	18	33	47	−14	40	
17	Rayo Vallecano	38	8	14	16	29	48	−19	38	
18	Cádiz (R)	38	6	15	17	26	55	−29	33	Relegation to Segunda División
19	Almería (R)	38	3	12	23	43	75	−32	21 (Note: Tied on head-to-head points. Almería finished ahead of Granada on overall goal difference.)	Relegation to Segunda División
20	Granada (R)	38	4	9	25	38	79	−41	21	Relegation to Segunda División

Source: LaLiga EA Sports
Rules for classification: 1) Points; 2) Head-to-head points; 3) Head-to-head goal difference; 4) Goal difference; 5) Goals scored; 6) Fair-play points
(Note: Head-to-head record is used only after all the matches between the teams in question have been played)
(C) Champions; (R) Relegation

==== Segunda División ====
Pos	Team	Pld	W	D	L	GF	GA	GD	Pts	Qualification or relegation
1	Leganés (C, P)	42	20	14	8	56	27	+29	74	Promotion to La Liga
2	Valladolid (P)	42	21	9	12	51	36	+15	72	Promotion to La Liga
3	Eibar	42	21	8	13	72	48	+24	71	Qualification for promotion play-offs
4	Espanyol (O, P)	42	17	18	7	59	40	+19	69	Qualification for promotion play-offs
5	Sporting Gijón	42	18	11	13	51	42	+9	65	Qualification for promotion play-offs
6	Oviedo	42	17	13	12	55	39	+16	64 (Note: Oviedo finished ahead of Racing Santander on overall goal difference)	Qualification for promotion play-offs
7	Racing Santander	42	18	10	14	63	55	+8	64	
8	Levante	42	13	20	9	49	45	+4	59 (Note: Levante finished ahead of Burgos, Racing Ferrol, and Elche on head-to-head points: Levante 12 pts, Burgos 8 pts, Racing Ferrol 8 pts, Elche 4 pts. Burgos finished ahead of Racing Ferrol on head-to-head points: Racing Ferrol 1–1 Burgos, Burgos 2–0 Racing Ferrol)	
9	Burgos	42	16	11	15	52	54	−2	59	
10	Racing Ferrol	42	15	14	13	49	52	−3	59	
11	Elche	42	16	11	15	43	46	−3	59	
12	Tenerife	42	15	11	16	38	41	−3	56	
13	Albacete	42	12	15	15	50	56	−6	51 (Note: Albacete finished ahead of Cartagena and Zaragoza on head-to-head points: Albacete 6 pts, Cartagena 5 pts, Zaragoza 4 pts)	
14	Cartagena	42	14	9	19	37	51	−14	51	
15	Zaragoza	42	12	15	15	42	42	0	51	
16	Eldense	42	12	14	16	46	56	−10	50	
17	Huesca	42	11	16	15	36	33	+3	49 (Note: Huesca finished ahead of Mirandés on head-to-head points: Huesca 1–1 Mirandés, Mirandés 0–3 Huesca)	
18	Mirandés	42	12	13	17	47	55	−8	49	
19	Amorebieta (R)	42	11	12	19	37	53	−16	45	Relegation to Primera Federación
20	Alcorcón (R)	42	10	14	18	32	53	−21	44	Relegation to Primera Federación
21	Andorra (R)	42	11	10	21	33	53	−20	43 (Note: Andorra finished ahead of Villarreal B on overall goal difference)	Relegation to Primera Federación
22	Villarreal B (R)	42	11	10	21	41	62	−21	43	Relegation to Primera Federación

Updated to match(es) played on 2 Jun 2024. Source: LaLiga HyperMotion
Rules for classification: 1) Points; 2) Head-to-head points; 3) Head-to-head goal difference; 4) Goal difference; 5) Goals scored; 6) Fair-play points
(Note: Head-to-head record is used only after all the matches between the teams in question have been played)
(C) Champions; (O) Play-off winners; (P) Promoted; (R) Relegated

=== Cup competitions ===
==== 2023–24 Copa del Rey ====
===== Final =====
6 April 2024
22:00 CEST

Athletic Bilbao	1–1 (a.e.t.)	Mallorca
Sancet 50'	Report	Rodríguez 21'
Penalties
R. García (penalty scored); Muniain (penalty scored); Vesga (penalty scored); Berenguer (penalty scored)	4–2	(penalty scored) Muriqi; (penalty missed) Morlanes; (penalty missed) Radonjić; (penalty scored) Sánchez

La Cartuja, Seville
Attendance: 57,619
Referee: José Luis Munuera Montero

==== Supercopa de España ====
Semi-finals
10 January 2024 – Riyadh
Real Madrid (a.e.t.)	5
Atlético Madrid	3
11 January 2024 – Riyadh
Barcelona	2
Osasuna	0

Final
14 January 2024 – Riyadh
Real Madrid	4
Barcelona	1

===== Final =====
14 January 2024
22:00

Real Madrid	4–1	Barcelona
Vinícius 7', 10', 39' (pen.); Rodrygo 64'	Report	Lewandowski 33'

King Saud University Stadium, Riyadh
Attendance: 23,977
Referee: Juan Martínez Munuera (Valencian Community)

== Women's football ==
=== League season ===
==== Liga F ====
Pos	Team	Pld	W	D	L	GF	GA	GD	Pts	Qualification or relegation
1	Barcelona (C)	30	29	1	0	137	10	+127	88	Qualification for the Champions League group stage
2	Real Madrid	30	24	1	5	74	33	+41	73	Qualification for the Champions League second round
3	Atlético de Madrid	30	18	7	5	53	22	+31	61	Qualification for the Champions League first round
4	Levante	30	17	9	4	59	28	+31	60	
5	Athletic Club	30	17	2	11	38	37	+1	53	
6	Madrid CFF	30	15	5	10	61	54	+7	50	
7	Sevilla	30	13	5	12	53	56	−3	44	
8	Real Sociedad	30	9	9	12	40	55	−15	36	
9	UDG Tenerife	30	8	8	14	35	48	−13	32	
10	Eibar	30	8	7	15	22	48	−26	31	
11	Real Betis	30	8	6	16	31	69	−38	30	
12	Valencia	30	8	5	17	35	64	−29	29	
13	Levante Las Planas	30	6	10	14	38	58	−20	28	
14	Granada	30	8	3	19	33	58	−25	27	
15	Villarreal (R)	30	6	7	17	26	52	−26	25	Relegation to Primera Federación
16	Sporting de Huelva (R)	30	2	3	25	20	63	−43	9	Relegation to Primera Federación

Source: Liga F
Rules for classification: 1) Points; 2) Head-to-head points; 3) Goal difference; 4) Number of goals scored
(C) Champions; (R) Relegated

=== Cup competitions ===
==== Supercopa de España ====
Semi-finals
16 January 2024
Atlético Madrid	1
Levante (a.e.t.)	3
17 January 2024
Barcelona	4
Real Madrid	0

Final
20 January 2024
Levante	0
Barcelona	7

===== Final =====
20 January 2024
20:00

Levante	0–7	Barcelona
	Report	Paralluelo 12', 45+2'; Hansen 24', 36', 54'; Batlle 26'; Bonmatí 57'

Estadio Municipal de Butarque, Leganés
Attendance: 7,139
Referee: Olatz Rivera Olmedo (Zaragoza)
