= 2023–24 in German football =

Football in Germany
- Season: 2023–24

Men's football
- Bundesliga: Bayer Leverkusen
- 2. Bundesliga: FC St. Pauli
- 3. Liga: SSV Ulm
- DFB-Pokal: Bayer Leverkusen
- DFL-Supercup: RB Leipzig

Women's football
- Frauen-Bundesliga: Bayern Munich
- 2. Frauen-Bundesliga: Turbine Potsdam
- DFB-Pokal: VfL Wolfsburg

The 2023–24 season was the 114th season of competitive football in Germany.

== Promotion and relegation ==
=== Pre-season ===
League	Promoted to league	Relegated from league
Bundesliga	1. FC Heidenheim; Darmstadt 98	Schalke 04; Hertha BSC
2. Bundesliga	SV Elversberg; VfL Osnabrück; Wehen Wiesbaden	Arminia Bielefeld; Jahn Regensburg; SV Sandhausen
3. Liga	VfB Lübeck; Preußen Münster; SSV Ulm; SpVgg Unterhaching	SV Meppen; VfB Oldenburg; FSV Zwickau; SpVgg Bayreuth
Frauen-Bundesliga	RB Leipzig; 1. FC Nürnberg	SV Meppen; Turbine Potsdam
2. Frauen-Bundesliga	SV 67 Weinberg; Borussia Mönchengladbach; Hamburger SV	SC Freiburg II; 1. FC Köln II; Turbine Potsdam II

=== Post-season ===
League	Promoted to league	Relegated from league
Bundesliga	Holstein Kiel; FC St. Pauli	1. FC Köln; Darmstadt 98
2. Bundesliga	SSV Ulm; Preußen Münster; Jahn Regensburg	Wehen Wiesbaden; Hansa Rostock; VfL Osnabrück
3. Liga	Alemannia Aachen; Energie Cottbus; Hannover 96 II; VfB Stuttgart II	Hallescher FC; MSV Duisburg; VfB Lübeck; SC Freiburg II
Frauen-Bundesliga	Turbine Potsdam; Carl Zeiss Jena	1. FC Nürnberg; MSV Duisburg^{1}
2. Frauen-Bundesliga	SC Freiburg II; VfL Bochum; Union Berlin	VfL Wolfsburg II; TSG Hoffenheim II

MSV Duisburg did not take their spot in the 2024–25 2. Frauen-Bundesliga and were therefore relegated further to the 2024–25 Frauen-Regionalliga West, sparing SV 67 Weinberg from relegation from the 2023–24 2. Frauen-Bundesliga.

== National teams ==
Win Draw Loss

=== Germany national football team ===
==== Kits ====
Old home	New home	Old away	New away

==== UEFA Euro 2024 ====
===== Group A =====
Pos	Team	Pld	W	D	L	GF	GA	GD	Pts	Qualification
1	Germany (H)	3	2	1	0	8	2	+6	7	Advance to knockout stage
2	Switzerland	3	1	2	0	5	3	+2	5	Advance to knockout stage
3	Hungary	3	1	0	2	2	5	−3	3	
4	Scotland	3	0	1	2	2	7	−5	1	

Source: UEFA
Rules for classification: Group stage tiebreakers
(H) Hosts

14 June 2024 Group A	Germany	5–1	Scotland	Munich
21:00 (21:00 UTC+2)	Wirtz 10'; Musiala 19'; Havertz 45+1' (pen.); Füllkrug 68'; Can 90+3'	Report	Rüdiger 87' (o.g.)	Stadium: Allianz Arena; Attendance: 65,052; Referee: Clément Turpin (France)

19 June 2024 Group A	Germany	2–0	Hungary	Stuttgart
18:00 (18:00 UTC+2)	Musiala 22'; Gündoğan 67'	Report		Stadium: MHPArena; Attendance: 54,000; Referee: Danny Makkelie (Netherlands)

23 June 2024 Group A	Switzerland	1–1	Germany	Frankfurt, Germany
21:00 (21:00 UTC+2)	Ndoye 28'	Report	Füllkrug 90+2'	Stadium: Waldstadion; Attendance: 46,685; Referee: Daniele Orsato (Italy)

===== Knockout stage =====
29 June 2024 Round of 16	Germany	2–0	Denmark	Dortmund
21:00 (21:00 UTC+2)	Havertz 53' (pen.); Musiala 68'	Report		Stadium: Westfalenstadion; Attendance: 61,612; Referee: Michael Oliver (England)

5 July 2024 Quarter-finals	Spain	2–1 (a.e.t.)	Germany	Stuttgart
18:00 (18:00 UTC+2)	Olmo 51'; Merino 119'	Report	Wirtz 89'	Stadium: MHPArena; Attendance: 54,000; Referee: Anthony Taylor (England)

==== Friendly matches ====
9 September 2023 Friendly	Germany	1–4	Japan	Wolfsburg
20:45 (20:45 UTC+2)	Sané 19'	Report	J. Itō 11'; Ueda 22'; Asano 90'; Tanaka 90+2'	Stadium: Volkswagen Arena; Attendance: 24,980; Referee: João Pinheiro (Portugal)

12 September 2023 Friendly	Germany	2–1	France	Dortmund
21:00 (21:00 UTC+2)	Müller 4'; Sané 87'	Report	Griezmann 89' (pen.)	Stadium: Westfalenstadion; Attendance: 60,486; Referee: Anthony Taylor (England)

14 October 2023 Friendly	United States	1–3	Germany	East Hartford
21:00 (15:00 UTC−4)	Pulisic 27'	Report	Gündoğan 39'; Füllkrug 58'; Musiala 61'	Stadium: Pratt & Whitney Stadium; Attendance: 37,743; Referee: Fernando Guerrero (Mexico)

18 October 2023 Friendly	Mexico	2–2	Germany	Philadelphia, United States
02:00 (20:00 UTC−4)	Antuna 37'; É. Sánchez 47'	Report	Rüdiger 25'; Füllkrug 51'	Stadium: Lincoln Financial Field; Attendance: 62,284; Referee: Rubiel Vazquez (United States)

18 November 2023 Friendly	Germany	2–3	Turkey	Berlin
20:45 (20:45 UTC+1)	Havertz 5'; Füllkrug 49'	Report	Kadıoğlu 38'; Yıldız 45+2'; Sarı 71' (pen.)	Stadium: Olympiastadion; Attendance: 72,592; Referee: Bartosz Frankowski (Poland)

21 November 2023 Friendly	Austria	2–0	Germany	Vienna
20:45 (20:45 UTC+1)	Sabitzer 29'; Baumgartner 73'	Report		Stadium: Ernst-Happel-Stadion; Attendance: 46,000; Referee: Slavko Vinčić (Slovenia)

23 March 2024 Friendly	France	0–2	Germany	Lyon
21:00 (21:00 UTC+1)		Report	Wirtz 1'; Havertz 49'	Stadium: Parc Olympique Lyonnais; Attendance: 56,000; Referee: Jesús Gil Manzano (Spain)

26 March 2024 Friendly	Germany	2–1	Netherlands	Frankfurt
20:45 (20:45 UTC+1)	Mittelstädt 11'; Füllkrug 85'	Report	Veerman 4'	Stadium: Waldstadion; Attendance: 48,390; Referee: Espen Eskås (Norway)

3 June 2024 Friendly	Germany	0–0	Ukraine	Nuremberg
20:45 (20:45 UTC+2)		Report		Stadium: Max-Morlock-Stadion; Attendance: 42,789; Referee: Walter Altmann (Austria)

7 June 2024 Friendly	Germany	2–1	Greece	Mönchengladbach
20:45 (20:45 UTC+2)	Havertz 56'; Groß 89'	Report	Masouras 34'	Stadium: Borussia-Park; Attendance: 45,488; Referee: José Luis Munuera Montero (Spain)

=== Germany women's national football team ===
==== Kits ====
Old home	New home	Old away	New away

==== 2023 FIFA Women's World Cup ====
===== Group H =====
Pos	Team	Pld	W	D	L	GF	GA	GD	Pts	Qualification
1	Colombia	3	2	0	1	4	2	+2	6	Advance to knockout stage
2	Morocco	3	2	0	1	2	6	−4	6	Advance to knockout stage
3	Germany	3	1	1	1	8	3	+5	4	
4	South Korea	3	0	1	2	1	4	−3	1	

Source: FIFA
Rules for classification: Group stage tiebreakers

24 July 2023 Group H	Germany	6–0	Morocco	Melbourne, Australia
10:30 (18:30 UTC+10)	Popp 11', 39'; Bühl 46'; Aït El Haj 54' (o.g.); Redouani 79' (o.g.); Schüller 90'	Report		Stadium: Melbourne Rectangular Stadium; Attendance: 27,256; Referee: Tori Penso (United States)

30 July 2023 Group H	Germany	1–2	Colombia	Sydney, Australia
11:30 (19:30 UTC+10)	Popp 89' (pen.)	Report	Caicedo 52'; Vanegas 90+7'	Stadium: Sydney Football Stadium; Attendance: 40,499; Referee: Melissa Borjas (Honduras)

3 August 2023 Group H	South Korea	1–1	Germany	Brisbane, Australia
12:00 (20:00 UTC+10)	Cho So-hyun 6'	Report	Popp 42'	Stadium: Lang Park; Attendance: 38,945; Referee: Anna-Marie Keighley (New Zealand)

==== 2023–24 UEFA Women's Nations League ====
===== 2023–24 UEFA Women's Nations League A Group A3 =====
Pos	Team	Pld	W	D	L	GF	GA	GD	Pts	Qualification or relegation	(Germany)	(Denmark)	(Iceland)	(Wales)
1	Germany	6	4	1	1	14	3	+11	13	Qualification for Nations League Finals	—	3–0	4–0	5–1
2	Denmark	6	4	0	2	10	6	+4	12		2–0	—	0–1	2–1
3	Iceland (O)	6	3	0	3	4	8	−4	9	Qualification for relegation play-offs	0–2	0–1	—	1–0
4	Wales (R)	6	0	1	5	4	15	−11	1	Relegation to League B	0–0	1–5	1–2	—

Source: UEFA
Rules for classification: Tiebreakers
(O) Play-off winners; (R) Relegated

====== 2023–24 UEFA Women's Nations League fixtures and results ======
22 September 2023 2023–24 Women's Nations League A	Denmark	2–0	Germany	Viborg
18:00 (18:00 UTC+2)	Vangsgaard 23', 64'	Report		Stadium: Viborg Stadium; Attendance: 4,210; Referee: Marta Huerta de Aza (Spain)

26 September 2023 2023–24 Women's Nations League A	Germany	4–0	Iceland	Bochum
18:15 UTC+2)	Bühl 19', 78'; Gwinn 35' (pen.); Schüller 42'	Report		Stadium: Ruhrstadion; Attendance: 14,998; Referee: Alina Peşu (Romania)

27 October 2023 2023–24 Women's Nations League A	Germany	5–1	Wales	Sinsheim
17:45 (17:45 UTC+2)	Schüller 25', 47'; Gwinn 80' (pen.); Roberts 86' (o.g.); Anyomi 88'	Report	Holland 42'	Stadium: Rhein-Neckar-Arena; Attendance: 20,107; Referee: Monika Mularczyk (Poland)

31 October 2023 2023–24 Women's Nations League A	Iceland	0–2	Germany	Reykjavík
19:00 (20:00 UTC+1)		Report	Gwinn 65' (pen.); Bühl 90+4'	Stadium: Laugardalsvöllur; Attendance: 1,245; Referee: Tess Olofsson (Sweden)

1 December 2023 2023–24 Women's Nations League A	Germany	3–0	Denmark	Rostock
20:30 (20:30 UTC+1)	Popp 14'; Hegering 26'; Bühl 90+3'	Report		Stadium: Ostseestadion; Attendance: 19,180; Referee: Maria Sole Ferrieri Caputi (Italy)

5 December 2023 2023–24 Women's Nations League A	Wales	0–0	Germany	Swansea
20:15 (19:15 UTC+1)		Report		Stadium: Swansea Stadium; Attendance: 5,982; Referee: Iuliana Demetrescu (Romania)

===== 2024 UEFA Women's Nations League Finals =====
23 February 2024 2023–24 Women's Nations League SF	France	2–1	Germany	Décines-Charpieu
21:00 (21:00 UTC+1)	Diani 41'; Karchaoui 45+4' (pen.)	Report	Gwinn 82' (pen.)	Stadium: Parc Olympique Lyonnais; Attendance: 30,267; Referee: Esther Staubli (Switzerland)

28 February 2024 2023–24 Women's Nations League 3rd	Netherlands	0–2	Germany	Heerenveen
20:45 (20:45 UTC+1)		Report	Bühl 66'; Schüller 78'	Stadium: Abe Lenstra Stadion; Attendance: 21,128; Referee: Stéphanie Frappart (France)

==== UEFA Women's Euro 2025 qualifying ====
===== UEFA Women's Euro 2025 qualifying League A =====
Pos	Team	Pld	W	D	L	GF	GA	GD	Pts	Qualification	(Germany)	(Iceland)	(Austria)	(Poland)
1	Germany	6	5	0	1	17	8	+9	15	Qualify for final tournament	—	3–1	4–0	4–1
2	Iceland	6	4	1	1	11	5	+6	13	Qualify for final tournament	3–0	—	2–1	3–0
3	Austria	6	2	1	3	10	12	−2	7	Advance to play-offs (seeded)	2–3	1–1	—	3–1
4	Poland (R)	6	0	0	6	4	17	−13	0	Advance to play-offs (seeded) and relegation to League B	1–3	0–1	1–3	—

Source: UEFA
Rules for classification: Tiebreakers
(R) Relegated

===== UEFA Women's Euro 2025 qualifying fixtures and results =====
5 April 2024 UEFA Women's Euro 2025 qualifying	Austria	2–3	Germany	Linz
20:30 (20:30 UTC+2)	Campbell 9', 17'	Report	Bühl 39', 49'; Gwinn 63' (pen.)	Stadium: Raiffeisen Arena; Attendance: 7,500; Referee: Tess Olofsson (Sweden)

9 April 2024 UEFA Women's Euro 2025 qualifying	Germany	3–1	Iceland	Aachen
18:10 (18:10 UTC+2)	Schüller 4', 34'; Oberdorf 45+3'	Report	Eiríksdóttir 23'	Stadium: Tivoli; Attendance: 16,503; Referee: Jana Adámková (Czech Republic)

31 May 2024 UEFA Women's Euro 2025 qualifying	Germany	4–1	Poland	Rostock
20:30 (20:30 UTC+2)	Zieniewicz 34' (o.g.); Schüller 78'; Gwinn 84', 88'	Report	Padilla 1'	Stadium: Ostseestadion; Attendance: 18,765; Referee: Jelena Ćetković (Serbia)

4 June 2024 UEFA Women's Euro 2025 qualifying	Poland	1–3	Germany	Gdynia
18:00 (18:00 UTC+2)	Grabowska 12'	Report	Schüller 51', 69'; Bühl 77'	Stadium: Stadion Miejski w Gdyni; Attendance: 4,012; Referee: Olatz Rivera Olmedo (Spain)

==== Friendly matches ====
7 July 2023 Friendly	Germany	2–3	Zambia	Fürth
20:30 (20:30 UTC+2)	Schüller 90+1'; Popp 90+10'	Report	B. Banda 48', 90+12'; Kundananji 54'	Stadium: Sportpark Ronhof Thomas Sommer; Attendance: 11,404; Referee: Vivian Peeters (Netherlands)

== League season ==
=== Men ===
==== Bundesliga ====
===== Bundesliga standings =====
Pos	Team	Pld	W	D	L	GF	GA	GD	Pts	Qualification or relegation
1	Bayer Leverkusen (C)	34	28	6	0	89	24	+65	90	Qualification for the Champions League league phase (Note: The Bundesliga gained an additional Champions League place as a result of Germany finishing as one of the two associations with the highest UEFA coefficient points in 2023–24.)
2	VfB Stuttgart	34	23	4	7	78	39	+39	73	Qualification for the Champions League league phase
3	Bayern Munich	34	23	3	8	94	45	+49	72	Qualification for the Champions League league phase
4	RB Leipzig	34	19	8	7	77	39	+38	65	Qualification for the Champions League league phase
5	Borussia Dortmund	34	18	9	7	68	43	+25	63	Qualification for the Champions League league phase
6	Eintracht Frankfurt	34	11	14	9	51	50	+1	47	Qualification for the Europa League league phase (Note: Since the 2023–24 DFB-Pokal winners, Bayer Leverkusen, qualified for the Champions League via league position, the spot reserved for the DFB-Pokal winners (Europa League league phase) was passed to the seventh-placed team, and the Conference League play-off round spot was passed to the eighth-placed team.)
7	TSG Hoffenheim	34	13	7	14	66	66	0	46	Qualification for the Europa League league phase
8	1. FC Heidenheim	34	10	12	12	50	55	−5	42	Qualification for the Conference League play-off round
9	Werder Bremen	34	11	9	14	48	54	−6	42	
10	SC Freiburg	34	11	9	14	45	58	−13	42	
11	FC Augsburg	34	10	9	15	50	60	−10	39	
12	VfL Wolfsburg	34	10	7	17	41	56	−15	37	
13	Mainz 05	34	7	14	13	39	51	−12	35	
14	Borussia Mönchengladbach	34	7	13	14	56	67	−11	34	
15	Union Berlin	34	9	6	19	33	58	−25	33	
16	VfL Bochum (O)	34	7	12	15	42	74	−32	33	Qualification for the relegation play-offs
17	1. FC Köln (R)	34	5	12	17	28	60	−32	27	Relegation to 2. Bundesliga
18	Darmstadt 98 (R)	34	3	8	23	30	86	−56	17	Relegation to 2. Bundesliga

Source: DFB
Rules for classification: 1) Points; 2) Goal difference; 3) Goals scored; 4) Head-to-head results; 5) Head-to-head away goals scored; 6) Away goals scored; 7) Play-off.
(C) Champions; (O) Play-off winners; (R) Relegated

==== 2. Bundesliga ====
===== 2. Bundesliga standings =====
Pos	Team	Pld	W	D	L	GF	GA	GD	Pts	Qualification or relegation
1	FC St. Pauli (C, P)	34	20	9	5	62	36	+26	69	Promotion to Bundesliga
2	Holstein Kiel (P)	34	21	5	8	65	39	+26	68	Promotion to Bundesliga
3	Fortuna Düsseldorf	34	18	9	7	72	40	+32	63	Qualification for promotion play-offs
4	Hamburger SV	34	17	7	10	64	44	+20	58	
5	Karlsruher SC	34	15	10	9	68	48	+20	55	
6	Hannover 96	34	13	13	8	59	44	+15	52	
7	SC Paderborn	34	15	7	12	54	54	0	52	
8	Greuther Fürth	34	14	8	12	50	49	+1	50	
9	Hertha BSC	34	13	9	12	69	59	+10	48	
10	Schalke 04	34	12	7	15	53	60	−7	43	
11	SV Elversberg	34	12	7	15	49	63	−14	43	
12	1. FC Nürnberg	34	11	7	16	43	64	−21	40	
13	1. FC Kaiserslautern	34	11	6	17	59	64	−5	39	
14	1. FC Magdeburg	34	9	11	14	46	54	−8	38	
15	Eintracht Braunschweig	34	11	5	18	37	53	−16	38	
16	Wehen Wiesbaden (R)	34	8	8	18	36	50	−14	32	Qualification for relegation play-offs
17	Hansa Rostock (R)	34	9	4	21	30	57	−27	31	Relegation to 3. Liga
18	VfL Osnabrück (R)	34	6	10	18	31	69	−38	28	Relegation to 3. Liga

Source: DFB
Rules for classification: 1) Points; 2) Goal difference; 3) Goals scored; 4) Head-to-head results; 5) Head-to-head away goals scored; 6) Away goals scored; 7) Play-off.
(Rules 4–6 only apply after home and away matches have been played between the tied teams.)
(C) Champions; (P) Promoted; (R) Relegated

==== 3. Liga ====
===== 3. Liga standings =====
Pos	Team	Pld	W	D	L	GF	GA	GD	Pts	Promotion, qualification or relegation
1	SSV Ulm (C, P)	38	23	8	7	65	38	+27	77	Promotion to 2. Bundesliga and qualification for DFB-Pokal
2	Preußen Münster (P)	38	19	10	9	68	49	+19	67	Promotion to 2. Bundesliga and qualification for DFB-Pokal
3	Jahn Regensburg (O, P)	38	17	12	9	51	42	+9	63	Qualification for promotion play-offs and DFB-Pokal
4	Dynamo Dresden	38	19	5	14	58	40	+18	62	Qualification for DFB-Pokal
5	1. FC Saarbrücken	38	15	15	8	60	43	+17	60	
6	Erzgebirge Aue	38	16	12	10	51	47	+4	60	
7	Rot-Weiss Essen	38	17	8	13	60	53	+7	59	
8	SV Sandhausen	38	15	11	12	58	57	+1	56	
9	SpVgg Unterhaching	38	16	7	15	50	49	+1	55	
10	FC Ingolstadt	38	14	12	12	65	51	+14	54	
11	Borussia Dortmund II (Note: Reserve teams are ineligible for promotion or DFB-Pokal qualification.)	38	14	12	12	58	53	+5	54	
12	SC Verl	38	14	11	13	59	56	+3	53	
13	Viktoria Köln	38	13	10	15	59	65	−6	49	
14	Arminia Bielefeld	38	11	13	14	48	47	+1	46	
15	1860 Munich	38	13	7	18	40	42	−2	46	
16	Waldhof Mannheim	38	11	10	17	51	60	−9	43	
17	Hallescher FC (R)	38	11	7	20	50	68	−18	40	Relegation to Regionalliga
18	MSV Duisburg (R)	38	8	10	20	41	65	−24	34	Relegation to Regionalliga
19	VfB Lübeck (R)	38	6	14	18	37	77	−40	32	Relegation to Regionalliga
20	SC Freiburg II (R)	38	8	6	24	37	64	−27	30	Relegation to Regionalliga

Source: DFB
Rules for classification: 1) Points; 2) Goal difference; 3) Goals scored; 4) Head-to-head results; 5) Head-to-head away goals scored; 6) Away goals scored; 7) Play-off.
(C) Champions; (O) Play-off winners; (P) Promoted; (R) Relegated

=== Women ===
==== Frauen-Bundesliga ====
===== Frauen-Bundesliga standings =====
Pos	Team	Pld	W	D	L	GF	GA	GD	Pts	Qualification or relegation
1	Bayern Munich (C)	22	19	3	0	60	8	+52	60	Qualification for Champions League group stage
2	VfL Wolfsburg	22	17	2	3	67	19	+48	53	Qualification for Champions League second round
3	Eintracht Frankfurt	22	14	2	6	42	25	+17	44	Qualification for Champions League first round
4	SGS Essen	22	10	5	7	33	26	+7	35	
5	TSG Hoffenheim	22	10	4	8	43	35	+8	34	
6	Bayer Leverkusen	22	8	7	7	34	25	+9	31	
7	Werder Bremen	22	8	4	10	34	31	+3	28	
8	RB Leipzig	22	7	5	10	26	41	−15	26	
9	SC Freiburg	22	6	6	10	26	44	−18	24	
10	1. FC Köln	22	5	3	14	25	43	−18	18	
11	1. FC Nürnberg (R)	22	4	3	15	16	61	−45	15	Relegation to 2. Bundesliga
12	MSV Duisburg (R)	22	0	4	18	16	64	−48	4	Demotion to Regionalliga

Source: DFB
Rules for classification: 1) Points; 2) Goal difference; 3) Goals scored; 4) Head-to-head results; 5) Head-to-head away goals scored; 6) Away goals scored; 7) Play-off.
(C) Champions; (R) Relegated

==== 2. Frauen-Bundesliga ====
===== 2. Frauen-Bundesliga standings =====
Pos	Team	Pld	W	D	L	GF	GA	GD	Pts	Qualification or relegation
1	Turbine Potsdam (C, P)	26	17	4	5	37	18	+19	55	Promotion to Bundesliga
2	Carl Zeiss Jena (P)	26	16	6	4	58	28	+30	54	Promotion to Bundesliga
3	SV Meppen	26	16	5	5	46	14	+32	53	
4	Hamburger SV	26	15	5	6	58	33	+25	50	
5	SG Andernach	26	13	7	6	42	32	+10	46	
6	SC Sand	26	12	7	7	45	32	+13	43	
7	FSV Gütersloh	26	12	6	8	46	39	+7	42	
8	Eintracht Frankfurt II (Note: Reserve teams cannot compete in the Frauen-Bundesliga and are therefore ineligible for promotion.)	26	11	4	11	33	35	−2	37	
9	Borussia Mönchengladbach	26	8	7	11	31	38	−7	31	
10	FC Ingolstadt	26	7	6	13	26	43	−17	27	
11	Bayern Munich II	26	6	5	15	33	42	−9	23	
12	SV 67 Weinberg (Note: Although finishing in 12th place and in the relegation zone, Weinberg was not relegated as MSV Duisburg did not take their spot in the 2024–25 2. Frauen-Bundesliga.)	26	5	5	16	31	62	−31	20	
13	VfL Wolfsburg II (R)	26	4	4	18	20	60	−40	16	Relegation to Regionalliga
14	TSG Hoffenheim II (R)	26	3	3	20	19	49	−30	12	Relegation to Regionalliga

Source: DFB
Rules for classification: 1) Points; 2) Goal difference; 3) Goals scored; 4) Head-to-head results; 5) Head-to-head away goals scored; 6) Away goals scored; 7) Play-off.
(C) Champions; (P) Promoted; (R) Relegated

== Cup competitions ==
=== Men ===
==== DFB-Pokal ====
===== Final =====
25 May 2024
20:00 CEST

1. FC Kaiserslautern	0–1	Bayer Leverkusen
	Report	Xhaka 16'

Olympiastadion, Berlin
Attendance: 74,322
Referee: Bastian Dankert (Rostock)

==== DFL-Supercup ====
12 August 2023
20:45 CEST

Bayern Munich	0–3	RB Leipzig
	Report	Olmo 3', 44', 68' (pen.)

Allianz Arena, Munich
Attendance: 75,000
Referee: Bastian Dankert (Rostock)

=== Women ===
==== DFB-Pokal Frauen ====
9 May 2024
16:00

Bayern Munich	0–2	VfL Wolfsburg
	Report	Brand 14'; Janssen 40'

RheinEnergieStadion, Cologne
Attendance: 44,000
Referee: Miriam Schwermer

== German clubs in Europe ==
=== UEFA Champions League ===
==== Group stage ====
===== Group A =====
Pos	Team	Pld	W	D	L	GF	GA	GD	Pts	Qualification	BAY	CPH	GAL	MUN
1	(Germany) Bayern Munich	6	5	1	0	12	6	+6	16	Advance to knockout phase	—	0–0	2–1	4–3
2	(Denmark) Copenhagen	6	2	2	2	8	8	0	8	Advance to knockout phase	1–2	—	1–0	4–3
3	(Turkey) Galatasaray	6	1	2	3	10	13	−3	5	Transfer to Europa League	1–3	2–2	—	3–3
4	(England) Manchester United	6	1	1	4	12	15	−3	4		0–1	1–0	2–3	—

Source: UEFA

===== Group C =====
Pos	Team	Pld	W	D	L	GF	GA	GD	Pts	Qualification	RMA	NAP	BRA	UNB
1	(Spain) Real Madrid	6	6	0	0	16	7	+9	18	Advance to knockout phase	—	4–2	3–0	1–0
2	(Italy) Napoli	6	3	1	2	10	9	+1	10	Advance to knockout phase	2–3	—	2–0	1–1
3	(Portugal) Braga	6	1	1	4	6	12	−6	4	Transfer to Europa League	1–2	1–2	—	1–1
4	(Germany) Union Berlin	6	0	2	4	6	10	−4	2		2–3	0–1	2–3	—

Source: UEFA

===== Group F =====
Pos	Team	Pld	W	D	L	GF	GA	GD	Pts	Qualification	DOR	PAR	MIL	NEW
1	(Germany) Borussia Dortmund	6	3	2	1	7	4	+3	11	Advance to knockout phase	—	1–1	0–0	2–0
2	(France) Paris Saint-Germain	6	2	2	2	9	8	+1	8 (Note: Tied on head-to-head points. Head-to-head goal difference: Paris Saint-Germain +2, Milan −2.)	Advance to knockout phase	2–0	—	3–0	1–1
3	(Italy) Milan	6	2	2	2	5	8	−3	8	Transfer to Europa League	1–3	2–1	—	0–0
4	(England) Newcastle United	6	1	2	3	6	7	−1	5		0–1	4–1	1–2	—

Source: UEFA

===== Group G =====
Pos	Team	Pld	W	D	L	GF	GA	GD	Pts	Qualification	MCI	RBL	YB	RSB
1	(England) Manchester City	6	6	0	0	18	7	+11	18	Advance to knockout phase	—	3–2	3–0	3–1
2	(Germany) RB Leipzig	6	4	0	2	13	10	+3	12	Advance to knockout phase	1–3	—	2–1	3–1
3	(Switzerland) Young Boys	6	1	1	4	7	13	−6	4	Transfer to Europa League	1–3	1–3	—	2–0
4	(Serbia) Red Star Belgrade	6	0	1	5	7	15	−8	1		2–3	1–2	2–2	—

Source: UEFA

==== Knockout phase ====
===== Round of 16 =====
Team 1	Agg.	Team 2	1st leg	2nd leg
PSV Eindhoven (Netherlands)	1–3	(Germany) Borussia Dortmund	1–1	0–2
Lazio (Italy)	1–3	(Germany) Bayern Munich	1–0	0–3
RB Leipzig (Germany)	1–2	(Spain) Real Madrid	0–1	1–1

===== Quarter-finals =====
Team 1	Agg.	Team 2	1st leg	2nd leg
Arsenal (England)	2–3	(Germany) Bayern Munich	2–2	0–1
Atlético Madrid (Spain)	4–5	(Germany) Borussia Dortmund	2–1	2–4

===== Semi-finals =====
Team 1	Agg.	Team 2	1st leg	2nd leg
Borussia Dortmund (Germany)	2–0	(France) Paris Saint-Germain	1–0	1–0
Bayern Munich (Germany)	3–4	(Spain) Real Madrid	2–2	1–2

===== Final =====
1 June 2024
20:00 UTC+1

Borussia Dortmund (Germany)	0–2	(Spain) Real Madrid
	Report	Carvajal 74'; Vinícius 83'

Wembley Stadium, London
Attendance: 86,212
Referee: Slavko Vinčić (Slovenia)

=== UEFA Europa League ===
==== Group stage ====
===== Group A =====
Pos	Team	Pld	W	D	L	GF	GA	GD	Pts	Qualification	WHU	FRE	OLY	TSC
1	(England) West Ham United	6	5	0	1	10	4	+6	15	Advance to round of 16	—	2–0	1–0	3–1
2	(Germany) SC Freiburg	6	4	0	2	17	7	+10	12	Advance to knockout round play-offs	1–2	—	5–0	5–0
3	(Greece) Olympiacos	6	2	1	3	11	14	−3	7	Transfer to Europa Conference League	2–1	2–3	—	5–2
4	(Serbia) TSC	6	0	1	5	6	19	−13	1		0–1	1–3	2–2	—

Source: UEFA

===== Group H =====
Pos	Team	Pld	W	D	L	GF	GA	GD	Pts	Qualification	LEV	QAR	MOL	HAC
1	(Germany) Bayer Leverkusen	6	6	0	0	19	3	+16	18	Advance to round of 16	—	5–1	5–1	4–0
2	(Azerbaijan) Qarabağ	6	3	1	2	7	9	−2	10	Advance to knockout round play-offs	0–1	—	1–0	2–1
3	(Norway) Molde	6	2	1	3	12	12	0	7	Transfer to Europa Conference League	1–2	2–2	—	5–1
4	(Sweden) BK Häcken	6	0	0	6	3	17	−14	0		0–2	0–1	1–3	—

Source: UEFA

==== Knockout phase ====
===== Knockout round play-offs =====
Team 1	Agg.	Team 2	1st leg	2nd leg
Lens (France)	2–3	(Germany) SC Freiburg	0–0	2–3 (a.e.t.)

===== Round of 16 =====
Team 1	Agg.	Team 2	1st leg	2nd leg
SC Freiburg (Germany)	1–5	(England) West Ham United	1–0	0–5
Qarabağ (Azerbaijan)	4–5	(Germany) Bayer Leverkusen	2–2	2–3

===== Quarter-finals =====
Team 1	Agg.	Team 2	1st leg	2nd leg
Bayer Leverkusen (Germany)	3–1	(England) West Ham United	2–0	1–1

===== Semi-finals =====
Team 1	Agg.	Team 2	1st leg	2nd leg
Roma (Italy)	2–4	(Germany) Bayer Leverkusen	0–2	2–2

===== Final =====
22 May 2024
20:00 UTC+1

Atalanta (Italy)	3–0	(Germany) Bayer Leverkusen
Lookman 12', 26', 75'	Report

Aviva Stadium, Dublin
Attendance: 47,135
Referee: István Kovács (Romania)

=== UEFA Europa Conference League ===
==== Qualifying phase and play-off round ====
===== Play-off round =====
Team 1	Agg.	Team 2	1st leg	2nd leg
Levski Sofia (Bulgaria)	1–3	(Germany) Eintracht Frankfurt	1–1	0–2

==== Group stage ====
===== Group G =====
Pos	Team	Pld	W	D	L	GF	GA	GD	Pts	Qualification	PAOK	FRA	ABE	HJK
1	(Greece) PAOK	6	5	1	0	16	10	+6	16	Advance to round of 16	—	2–1	2–2	4–2
2	(Germany) Eintracht Frankfurt	6	3	0	3	11	7	+4	9	Advance to knockout round play-offs	1–2	—	2–1	6–0
3	(Scotland) Aberdeen	6	1	3	2	10	10	0	6		2–3	2–0	—	1–1
4	(Finland) HJK	6	0	2	4	7	17	−10	2		2–3	0–1	2–2	—

Source: UEFA

==== Knockout phase ====
===== Knockout round play-offs =====
Team 1	Agg.	Team 2	1st leg	2nd leg
Union Saint-Gilloise (Belgium)	4–3	(Germany) Eintracht Frankfurt	2–2	2–1

=== UEFA Women's Champions League ===
==== Qualifying rounds ====
===== Round 1 =====
====== Semi-finals ======
Team 1	Score	Team 2
Eintracht Frankfurt (Germany)	1–0	(Czech Republic) Slovácko

====== Final ======
Team 1	Score	Team 2
Juventus (Italy)	1–1 (a.e.t.) (4–5 p)	(Germany) Eintracht Frankfurt

===== Round 2 =====
Team 1	Agg.	Team 2	1st leg	2nd leg
Eintracht Frankfurt (Germany)	8–0	(Czech Republic) Sparta Prague	5–0	3–0
Paris FC (France)	5–3	(Germany) VfL Wolfsburg	3–3	2–0

==== Group stage ====
===== Group A =====
Pos	Team	Pld	W	D	L	GF	GA	GD	Pts	Qualification	BAR	BEN	FRA	ROS
1	(Spain) Barcelona	6	5	1	0	27	5	+22	16	Advance to quarter-finals	—	5–0	2–0	7–0
2	(Portugal) Benfica	6	2	3	1	9	12	−3	9	Advance to quarter-finals	4–4	—	1–0	1–0
3	(Germany) Eintracht Frankfurt	6	2	1	3	9	8	+1	7		1–3	1–1	—	5–0
4	(Sweden) Rosengård	6	0	1	5	3	23	−20	1		0–6	2–2	1–2	—

Source: UEFA

===== Group C =====
Pos	Team	Pld	W	D	L	GF	GA	GD	Pts	Qualification	PSG	AJA	BAY	ROM
1	(France) Paris Saint-Germain	6	3	1	2	10	8	+2	10	Advance to quarter-finals	—	3–1	0–1	2–1
2	(Netherlands) Ajax	6	3	1	2	7	8	−1	10	Advance to quarter-finals	2–0	—	1–0	2–1
3	(Germany) Bayern Munich	6	1	4	1	8	8	0	7		2–2	1–1	—	2–2
4	(Italy) Roma	6	1	2	3	10	11	−1	5		1–3	3–0	2–2	—

Source: UEFA
