= 2024 UEFA Women's Champions League final =

- Match programme cover
- Event: 2023–24 UEFA Women's Champions League
Barcelona	Lyon
(Spain)	(France)
2	0
- Date: 25 May 2024
- Venue: San Mamés Stadium, Bilbao
- Player of the Match: Aitana Bonmatí (Barcelona)
- Referee: Rebecca Welch (England)
- Attendance: 50,827
- Weather: Partly cloudy 21 °C (70 °F); 55% humidity

The 2024 UEFA Women's Champions League final was the final match of the 2023–24 UEFA Women's Champions League, the 23rd season of Europe's premier women's club football tournament organised by UEFA, and the 15th season since it was renamed from the UEFA Women's Cup to the UEFA Women's Champions League. The match was played at the San Mamés Stadium in Bilbao, Spain, on 25 May 2024, between Spanish club Barcelona and French club Lyon, a repeat of the 2019 and 2022 finals.

Barcelona won the match 2–0 for their second consecutive and third overall UEFA Women's Champions League title. Thus, they completed their first continental quadruple. As winners, Barcelona qualified for the 2028 FIFA Women's Club World Cup.

== Teams ==
In the following table, finals until 2009 were in the UEFA Women's Cup era, since 2010 were in the UEFA Women's Champions League era.

Team	Previous finals appearances (bold indicates winners)
(Spain) Barcelona	4 (2019, **2021**, 2022, **2023**)
(France) Lyon	10 (2010, **2011**, **2012**, 2013, **2016**, **2017**, **2018**, **2019**, **2020**, **2022**)

The final was a repeat of the same fixture in 2019 and 2022, both of which were won by Lyon. It was framed as a coming together of the two giants of women's football – Barcelona being the more dominant team in the 2020s but never beating Lyon, while Lyon held an historic record of Champions League victories – and thus a match to decide which of the two was the overall best.

== Venue ==
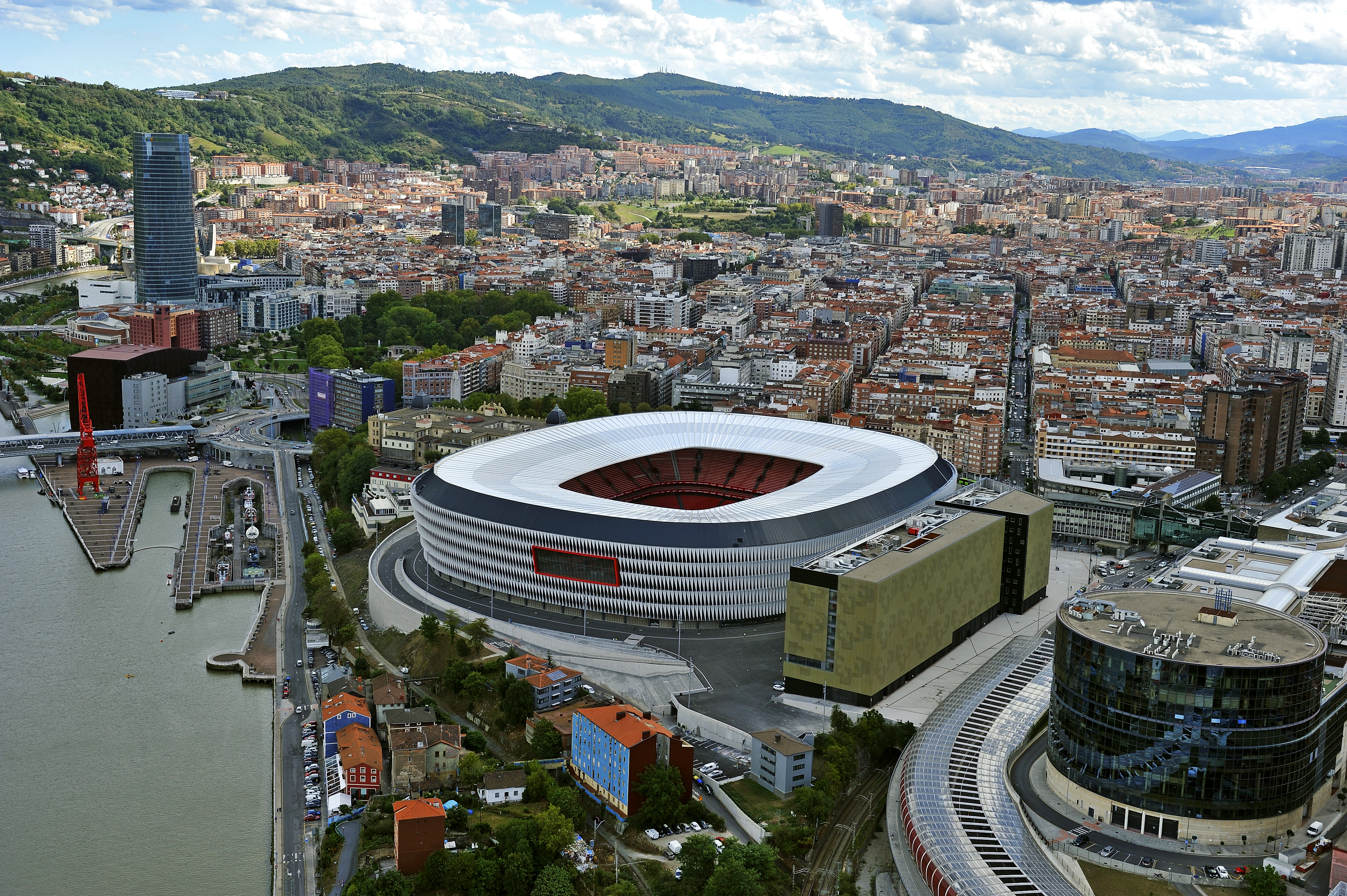
San Mamés Stadium in Bilbao hosted the final.

On 16 July 2021, the UEFA Executive Committee announced that due to the loss of hosting rights for UEFA Euro 2020, San Mamés Stadium in Bilbao was given hosting rights for the 2024 final and the 2025 UEFA Europa League final. This was part of a settlement agreement by UEFA to recognise the efforts and financial investment made to host the European Championships.

It was the third time that a UEFA Women's Champions League final was held in Spain, following the 2010 final in Getafe and the 2020 final in San Sebastián: Lyon contested both of the previous Spain-hosted finals, winning in 2020. Barcelona had been drawn as the administrative home team, and reports said that the stadium felt like a true home match, with around 40,000 Barcelona fans travelling across Spain to attend.

Official UEFA Fan Zones for both teams were hosted near the stadium in Bilbao, the first time fan zones were held for a Women's Champions League final. The expected popularity of the match prompted UEFA to have the fan zones, with the exceptional number of travelling Barcelona fans – ultimately setting a world record for the largest travelling contingent in women's football – and Bilbao's history of support for women's football suggested as reasons.

== Route to the final ==
Note: In all results below, the score of the finalist is given first (H: home; A: away).

(Spain) Barcelona				Round	(France) Lyon			
Opponent	Result			Group stage	Opponent	Result		
(Portugal) Benfica	5–0 (H)			Matchday 1	(Czech Republic) Slavia Prague	9–0 (A)		
(Germany) Eintracht Frankfurt	3–1 (A)			Matchday 2	(Austria) St. Pölten	2–0 (H)		
(Sweden) Rosengård	6–0 (A)			Matchday 3	(Norway) Brann	3–1 (H)		
(Sweden) Rosengård	7–0 (H)			Matchday 4	(Norway) Brann	2–2 (A)		
(Germany) Eintracht Frankfurt	2–0 (H)			Matchday 5	(Austria) St. Pölten	7–0 (A)		
(Portugal) Benfica	4–4 (A)			Matchday 6	(Czech Republic) Slavia Prague	2–2 (H)		
**Group A winners**: Pos / Team / Pld / Pts; **1** / (Spain) Barcelona / **6** / **16**; 2 / (Portugal) Benfica / 6 / **9**; 3 / (Germany) Eintracht Frankfurt / 6 / **7**; 4 / (Sweden) Rosengård / 6 / **1**; Source: UEFA				Final standings	**Group B winners**: Pos / Team / Pld / Pts; **1** / (France) Lyon / **6** / **14**; 2 / (Norway) Brann / 6 / **13**; 3 / (Czech Republic) Slavia Prague / 6 / **5**; 4 / (Austria) St. Pölten / 6 / **1**; Source: UEFA			
Opponent	Agg.	1st leg	2nd leg	Knockout phase	Opponent	Agg.	1st leg	2nd leg
(Norway) Brann	5–2	2–1 (A)	3–1 (H)	Quarter-finals	(Portugal) Benfica	6–2	2–1 (A)	4–1 (H)
(England) Chelsea	2–1	0–1 (H)	2–0 (A)	Semi-finals	(France) Paris Saint-Germain	5–3	3–2 (H)	2–1 (A)

== Match ==
=== Summary ===
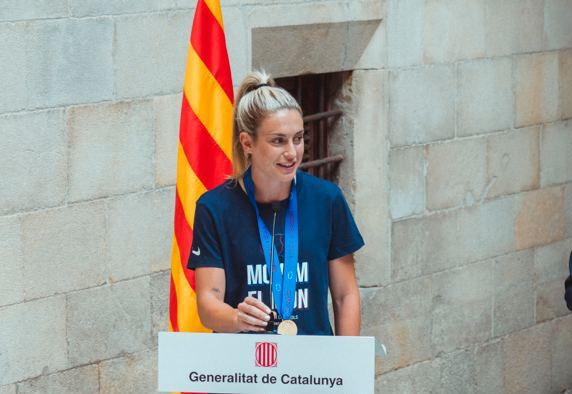
Barcelona captain Alexia Putellas with her winners' medal the following day: in her five minutes on the pitch in the final, Putellas made a recovery, scored a goal, and received a yellow card.

In the early minutes of the match, Barcelona defender Irene Paredes went down with ankle pain following a challenge from Lyon attacker Melchie Dumornay, but was able to continue; moments after play resumed, Dumornay created the first chance of the game but the ball was intercepted by Barcelona's Lucy Bronze. Barcelona immediately responded, but Salma Paralluelo's shot in the 6th minute was easily saved by Christiane Endler. Other chances fell to Barcelona, without success, before Lyon won a corner in the 14th minute and nearly scored from a mislaid clearance by Bronze before Cata Coll collected the ball at the second time of asking. Minutes later, Barcelona won a free kick in their attacking third, which was cleared, before winger Caroline Graham Hansen sent in another cross – this one dragged wide by an overlapping Bronze. Equal play resumed, including more physical challenges between Paredes and Dumornay, until the 28th minute, when Barcelona's Mariona Caldentey was able to win and carry the ball through the midfield unchallenged; her shot was messily saved by Endler. The next big chance fell to Lyon in the 36th minute, when Coll could only parry a cross back into the box; Paredes intercepted and Barcelona again took the ball to their attacking third through Graham Hansen. Calls for a penalty in the 37th minute after Paralluelo ended up on the ground in the box were dismissed and Lyon was awarded a free kick. They won a corner moments later, with imposing defender Wendie Renard's header easily saved by Coll. Graham Hansen spurred on Barcelona's attack before having her own good chance in the 44th minute, also dragging it wide. Following two additional minutes, the first half ended goalless.

Lyon started the second half with a direct attempt on goal, looking the more dangerous side in the early minutes. Then, in the 55th minute, Barcelona's Keira Walsh attempted to play a through ball for Graham Hansen from the midfield, but referee Rebecca Welch accidentally got in the way and touched the ball, having to restart play – The Guardian's live report suggested Lyon had been saved by Welch's mistake and noted that Barcelona players were furious with it. Chances at both ends in the next five minutes were prevented with relative ease before Barcelona's Aitana Bonmatí weaved her way into the box and took her own shot; an upward deflection off Lyon defender Vanessa Gilles sent the ball over Endler and into the net to break the deadlock and make it 1–0 in the 63rd minute. In the 70th minute, Wendie Renard received a yellow card for a challenge on Graham Hansen; the resulting Barcelona free kick delivery was handballed by Lyon midfielder Daniëlle van de Donk, with another free kick awarded and blocked. Graham Hansen made another run into the box in the 75th minute, prevented from shooting by a last-second sliding tackle from Selma Bacha. Lyon then managed a run into the box in the 78th minute, after Barcelona defender Ona Batlle was sent to the ground by Kadidiatou Diani's studs; Diani's attempted cross was punched away by Coll. In the process, Coll and Lyon's Lindsey Horan collided; both Coll, holding her ankle, and Batlle, with a face injury bleeding profusely, were treated on the pitch for several minutes. Play resumed in the 83rd minute. In the remaining regulation time, Barcelona held possession without making a breakthrough, and Lyon had an 87th-minute attempt from Horan shot far off target.

There were six minutes of injury time added, with Barcelona midfielder Alexia Putellas introduced as a substitute in the 92nd minute: Putellas recovered the ball from Dumornay inside her own box in the 94th minute then scored from well-built team play in the 95th minute to make it 2–0. She received a yellow card in the 96th minute for excessive celebration, after taking her shirt off. The match ended shortly after the restart of play, for Barcelona's first victory over Lyon.

=== Details ===
The "home" team (for administrative purposes) was determined by an additional draw held after the quarter-final and semi-final draws.

25 May 2024
18:00 UTC+2

Barcelona (Spain)	2–0	(France) Lyon
Bonmatí 63'; Putellas 90+5'	Report

San Mamés Stadium, Bilbao
Attendance: 50,827
Referee: Rebecca Welch (England)

**Barcelona**	**Lyon**

GK	13	(Spain) Cata Coll
RB	15	(England) Lucy Bronze
CB	2	(Spain) Irene Paredes
CB	23	(Norway) Ingrid Syrstad Engen
LB	16	(Sweden) Fridolina Rolfö		(substituted off) 66'
CM	14	(Spain) Aitana Bonmatí
CM	21	(England) Keira Walsh		(substituted off) 90+2'
CM	12	(Spain) Patricia Guijarro (c)
RF	10	(Norway) Caroline Graham Hansen
CF	7	(Spain) Salma Paralluelo		(substituted off) 85'
LF	9	(Spain) Mariona Caldentey		(substituted off) 90+2'
Substitutes:
GK	1	(Spain) Sandra Paños
GK	25	(Spain) Gemma Font
DF	4	(Spain) Mapi León
DF	5	(Spain) Jana Fernández
DF	8	(Spain) Marta Torrejón
DF	22	(Spain) Ona Batlle		(substituted on) 66'
DF	34	(Spain) Martina Fernández
MF	11	(Spain) Alexia Putellas	(yellow card) 90+6'	(substituted on) 90+2'
MF	30	(Spain) Vicky López
FW	6	(Spain) Clàudia Pina		(substituted on) 90+2'
FW	19	(Spain) Bruna Vilamala
FW	24	(Netherlands) Esmee Brugts		(substituted on) 85'
Manager:
(Spain) Jonatan Giráldez

GK	1	(Chile) Christiane Endler	(yellow card) 90+7'
RB	12	(Australia) Ellie Carpenter
CB	3	(France) Wendie Renard (c)	(yellow card) 70'
CB	21	(Canada) Vanessa Gilles		(substituted off) 81'
LB	4	(France) Selma Bacha
CM	26	(United States) Lindsey Horan
CM	13	(Netherlands) Damaris Egurrola
CM	17	(Netherlands) Daniëlle van de Donk		(substituted off) 81'
RF	11	(France) Kadidiatou Diani
CF	6	(Haiti) Melchie Dumornay
LF	20	(France) Delphine Cascarino		(substituted off) 63'
Substitutes:
GK	16	(France) Féerine Belhadj
GK	30	(Germany) Laura Benkarth
DF	5	(France) Perle Morroni
DF	18	(France) Alice Sombath
DF	24	(France) Alice Marques
DF	29	(France) Griedge Mbock Bathy
MF	7	(France) Amel Majri		(substituted on) 63'
MF	10	(Germany) Dzsenifer Marozsán
FW	14	(Norway) Ada Hegerberg		(substituted on) 81'
FW	27	(France) Vicki Bècho		(substituted on) 81'
Manager:
(France) Sonia Bompastor

Player of the Match:
Aitana Bonmatí (Barcelona)

Assistant referees:
Natalie Aspinall (England)
Emily Carney (England)
Fourth official:
Ivana Martinčić (Croatia)
Reserve assistant referee:
Sanja Rođak-Karšić (Croatia)
Video assistant referee:
Stuart Attwell (England)
Assistant video assistant referee:
Katrin Rafalski (Germany)
Offside video assistant referee:
Katalin Kulcsár (Hungary)

**Match rules**

- 90 minutes
- 30 minutes of extra time if necessary
- Penalty shoot-out if scores still level
- Maximum of twelve named substitutes
- Maximum of five substitutions, with a sixth allowed in extra time
- Maximum of three substitution opportunities, with a fourth allowed in extra time

=== Statistics ===
First half
Statistic	Barcelona	Lyon
Goals scored	0	0
Total shots	7	3
Shots on target	2	1
Saves	1	2
Ball possession	60%	40%
Corner kicks	0	3
Fouls committed	4	5
Offsides	0	2
Yellow cards	0	0
Red cards	0	0

Second half
Statistic	Barcelona	Lyon
Goals scored	2	0
Total shots	7	10
Shots on target	2	1
Saves	1	0
Ball possession	56%	44%
Corner kicks	1	2
Fouls committed	5	7
Offsides	1	0
Yellow cards	1	2
Red cards	0	0

Overall
Statistic	Barcelona	Lyon
Goals scored	2	0
Total shots	14	13
Shots on target	4	2
Saves	2	2
Ball possession	58%	42%
Corner kicks	1	5
Fouls committed	9	12
Offsides	1	2
Yellow cards	1	2
Red cards	0	0

== Pre-match pitch protest ==
During the pre-match anthems, two men carried a Palestinian flag bearing the slogans "Stop Genozide" and "EU don't be an accessory" onto the pitch before placing it on the ground along with the match banners. UEFA later said that the action had not been authorised, with the men reportedly wearing fake accreditation passes to gain access. The men left the pitch, and were apprehended by police who removed them from the stadium. No group has claimed the protest. While the crowd who noticed the action generally applauded it, the Israel Football Association described it as "wretched and cowardly"; Wembley Stadium was put on alert for similar protests ahead of the 2024 UEFA Champions League final that took place a week later on 1 June 2024.

== Aftermath ==
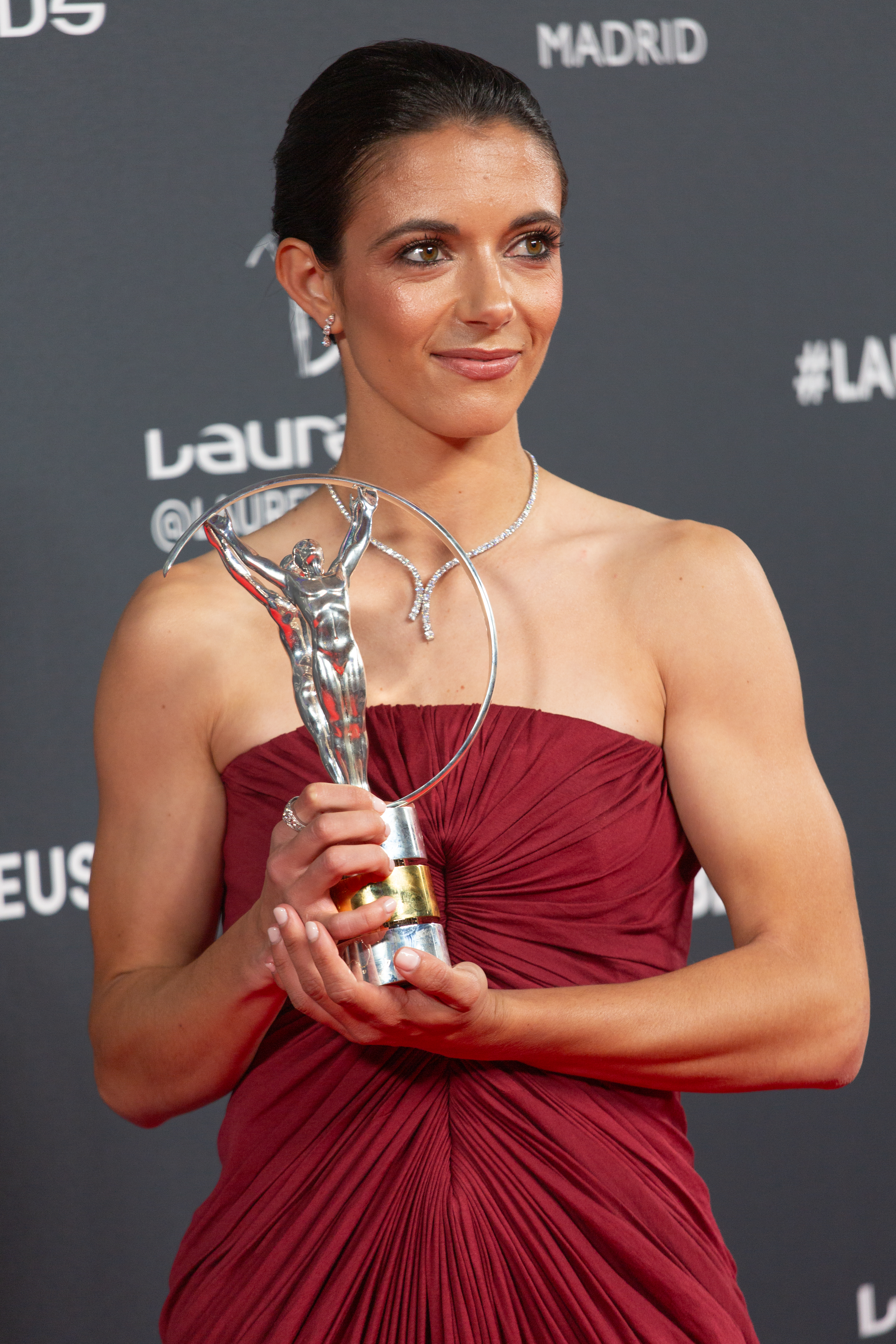
Aitana Bonmatí (pictured with her Laureus Sportswoman of the Year trophy) was named player of the match.

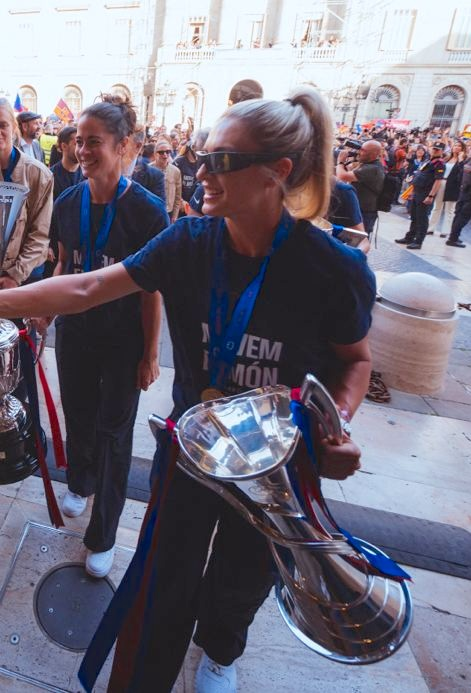
Alexia Putellas with the Women's Champions League trophy at Barcelona's winners' reception

Barcelona midfielder Aitana Bonmatí was named player of the match. With the victory, Barcelona successfully completed their first continental quadruple, defending their 2023 Women's Champions League title and winning all of the competitions they had featured in throughout the 2023–24 season. As with the previous year, the team was given a formal reception by the Generalitat de Catalunya and City Council of Barcelona the day after the final, presenting their trophy haul to thousands of fans gathered in Plaça Sant Jaume.

With Barcelona's victory, Lucy Bronze became the first English footballer to win five Champions League titles – including three with Lyon.

== See also ==
- 2023–24 FC Barcelona Femení season
- 2023–24 Olympique Lyonnais Féminin season
- 2024 UEFA Champions League final
- 2024 UEFA Europa League final
- 2024 UEFA Europa Conference League final
- 2024 UEFA Super Cup
- Media related to FC Barcelona (women) reception at Plaça Sant Jaume, 26 May 2024 at Wikimedia Commons
