= 2023–24 UEFA Women's Champions League group stage =

The 2023–24 UEFA Women's Champions League group stage began on 14 November 2023 and ended on 31 January 2024. A total of 16 teams were competing in the group stage to decide the eight places in the knockout phase of the 2023–24 UEFA Women's Champions League.

== Draw ==
The draw was held on 20 October 2023, and saw the 16 teams split into four pools of four teams.

- Pot 1 contained the four direct entrants, i.e., the Champions League holders and the champions of the top three associations based on their 2023 UEFA women's country coefficients.
- Pot 2, 3 and 4 contained the remaining teams, seeded based on their 2023 UEFA women's club coefficients.

Teams from the same association can not be drawn into the same group. Prior to the draw, UEFA formed one pairing of teams for associations with two or three teams based on television audiences, where one team was drawn into Groups A–B and another team into Groups C–D, so that the two teams play on different days. Clubs from countries with severe winter conditions (Sweden) were assigned a position in their group which allowed them to play away on matchday 6.

- (Spain) Barcelona and Real Madrid
- (France) Paris Saint-Germain and Lyon
- (Germany) Bayern Munich and Eintracht Frankfurt
- (Sweden) Rosengård and BK Häcken

== Teams ==
Below are the participating teams (with their 2023 UEFA club coefficients), grouped by their seeding pot.

- Four teams which entered in this stage
- 12 winners of the Round 2 (seven from Champions Path, five from League Path)

Key to colours
Group winners and runners-up advance to quarter-finals

Pot 1 (by association rank)
Assoc.	Team	Coeff.
TH & 1	(Spain) Barcelona	126.233
2	(France) Lyon	118.166
3	(Germany) Bayern Munich	96.333
4	(England) Chelsea	81.366

Pot 2
Team	Notes	Coeff.
(France) Paris Saint-Germain		97.166
(Czech Republic) Slavia Prague		39.233
(Spain) Real Madrid		37.233
(Sweden) Rosengård		33.399

Pot 3
Team	Notes	Coeff.
(Austria) St. Pölten		30.050
(Portugal) Benfica		22.800
(Sweden) BK Häcken		22.399
(Italy) Roma		21.000

Pot 4
Team	Notes	Coeff.
(Netherlands) Ajax		18.400
(France) Paris FC		18.166
(Germany) Eintracht Frankfurt		17.333
(Norway) Brann		7.100

Notes

1. ^{TH} Champions League title holders, automatically placed into Pot 1 as top seed. Because the title holders were also the champions of the third-ranked association, the champions of the fourth-ranked association also entered the group stage.
2. ^{CH} Winners of round 2 (Champions Path).
3. ^{LP} Winners of round 2 (League Path).

== Format ==
In each group, teams played against each other home-and-away in a round-robin format. The top two teams of each group advanced to the quarter-finals.

=== Tiebreakers ===
Teams are ranked according to points (3 points for a win, 1 point for a draw, 0 points for a loss). If two or more teams are tied on points, the following tiebreaking criteria are applied, in the order given, to determine the rankings (see Article 18 Equality of points – group stage, Regulations of the UEFA Women's Champions League):

1. Points in head-to-head matches among the tied teams;
2. Goal difference in head-to-head matches among the tied teams;
3. Goals scored in head-to-head matches among the tied teams;
4. If more than two teams were tied, and after applying all head-to-head criteria above, a subset of teams are still tied, all head-to-head criteria above are reapplied exclusively to this subset of teams;
5. Goal difference in all group matches;
6. Goals scored in all group matches;
7. Away goals scored in all group matches;
8. Wins in all group matches;
9. Away wins in all group matches;
10. Disciplinary points (direct red card = 3 points; double yellow card = 3 points; single yellow card = 1 point);
11. UEFA club coefficient.

== Groups ==
Times are CET, as listed by UEFA (local times, if different, are in parentheses).

=== Group A ===
Pos	Team	Pld	W	D	L	GF	GA	GD	Pts	Qualification	BAR	BEN	FRA	ROS
1	(Spain) Barcelona	6	5	1	0	27	5	+22	16	Advance to quarter-finals	—	5–0	2–0	7–0
2	(Portugal) Benfica	6	2	3	1	9	12	−3	9	Advance to quarter-finals	4–4	—	1–0	1–0
3	(Germany) Eintracht Frankfurt	6	2	1	3	9	8	+1	7		1–3	1–1	—	5–0
4	(Sweden) Rosengård	6	0	1	5	3	23	−20	1		0–6	2–2	1–2	—

Source: UEFA
Rules for classification: Group stage tiebreakers
14 November 2023
18:45

Rosengård (Sweden)	1–2	(Germany) Eintracht Frankfurt
Schough 90+4'	Report	Pawollek 25'; Dunst 84'

Malmö IP, Malmö
Attendance: 1,014
Referee: Maria Sole Ferrieri Caputi (Italy)
14 November 2023
21:00

Barcelona (Spain)	5–0	(Portugal) Benfica
Putellas 15', 39'; Bonmatí 44', 52'; Oshoala 62'	Report

Johan Cruyff Stadium, Sant Joan Despí
Attendance: 4,536
Referee: Lina Lehtovaara (Finland)

22 November 2023
21:00

Benfica (Portugal)	1–0	(Sweden) Rosengård
Kika 52'	Report

Benfica Campus, Seixal
Attendance: 777
Referee: Cheryl Foster (Wales)
22 November 2023
21:00

Eintracht Frankfurt (Germany)	1–3	(Spain) Barcelona
Freigang 42'	Report	Paralluelo 48', 62'; Caldentey 59'

Waldstadion, Frankfurt
Attendance: 16,100
Referee: Jana Adámková (Czech Republic)

13 December 2023
18:45

Rosengård (Sweden)	0–6	(Spain) Barcelona
	Report	Wik 16' (o.g.); Paralluelo 37'; Guijarro 44'; Bonmatí 62'; Caldentey 73' (pen.); Martina 90+2'

Malmö IP, Malmö
Attendance: 4,122
Referee: Monika Mularczyk (Poland)
13 December 2023
21:00

Benfica (Portugal)	1–0	(Germany) Eintracht Frankfurt
Alidou 71'	Report

Estádio da Luz, Lisbon
Attendance: 10,785
Referee: Rebecca Welch (England)

21 December 2023
18:45

Eintracht Frankfurt (Germany)	1–1	(Portugal) Benfica
Reuteler 28'	Report	Raysla 71'

Waldstadion, Frankfurt
Attendance: 10,200
Referee: Frida Klarlund (Denmark)
21 December 2023
21:00

Barcelona (Spain)	7–0	(Sweden) Rosengård
Walsh 15'; Graham Hansen 34'; Paralluelo 55', 60'; Pina 73'; Torrejón 75'; Wik 85' (o.g.)	Report

Johan Cruyff Stadium, Sant Joan Despí
Attendance: 5,072
Referee: Eleni Antoniou (Greece)

25 January 2024
18:45

Rosengård (Sweden)	2–2	(Portugal) Benfica
Schough 13'; Kadowaki 82'	Report	J. Silva 52'; Alidou 57'

Malmö IP, Malmö
Attendance: 789
Referee: Ivana Martinčić (Croatia)
25 January 2024
21:00

Barcelona (Spain)	2–0	(Germany) Eintracht Frankfurt
Guijarro 19'; Graham Hansen 73'	Report

Johan Cruyff Stadium, Sant Joan Despí
Attendance: 4,842
Referee: Deborah Anex (Switzerland)

31 January 2024
21:00

Benfica (Portugal)	4–4	(Spain) Barcelona
Alidou 26', 45'; J. Silva 71'; Bronze 81' (o.g.)	Report	Graham Hansen 18', 54'; Guijarro 20'; Bronze 90+6'

Benfica Campus, Seixal
Attendance: 2,307
Referee: Emanuela Rusta (Albania)
31 January 2024
21:00

Eintracht Frankfurt (Germany)	5–0	(Sweden) Rosengård
Açıkgöz 18'; Anyomi 66'; Martinez 74'; Gräwe 76'; Reuteler 84'	Report

Waldstadion, Frankfurt
Attendance: 5,100
Referee: Stéphanie Frappart (France)

=== Group B ===
Pos	Team	Pld	W	D	L	GF	GA	GD	Pts	Qualification	LYO	BRA	PRA	PÖL
1	(France) Lyon	6	4	2	0	25	5	+20	14	Advance to quarter-finals	—	3–1	2–2	2–0
2	(Norway) Brann	6	4	1	1	9	7	+2	13	Advance to quarter-finals	2–2	—	1–0	2–1
3	(Czech Republic) Slavia Prague	6	1	2	3	3	13	−10	5		0–9	0–1	—	1–0
4	(Austria) St. Pölten	6	0	1	5	2	14	−12	1		0–7	1–2	0–0	—

Source: UEFA
Rules for classification: Group stage tiebreakers
14 November 2023
18:45

St. Pölten (Austria)	1–2	(Norway) Brann
Mikolajová 68'	Report	Engesvik 57'; Anasi 79'

NÖ Arena, Sankt Pölten
Attendance: 1,034
Referee: Riem Hussein (Germany)
14 November 2023
21:00

Slavia Prague (Czech Republic)	0–9	(France) Lyon
	Report	Däbritz 3'; Van de Donk 14'; Gilles 17', 80'; Le Sommer 21'; Diani 24', 45'; Hegerberg 60' (pen.); Majri 62'

Fortuna Arena, Prague
Attendance: 2,728
Referee: Eleni Antoniou (Greece)

22 November 2023
18:45

Lyon (France)	2–0	(Austria) St. Pölten
Van de Donk 4'; Balog 47' (o.g.)	Report

Parc Olympique Lyonnais, Décines-Charpieu
Attendance: 6,076
Referee: Sandra Bastos (Portugal)
22 November 2023
18:45

Brann (Norway)	1–0	(Czech Republic) Slavia Prague
Crummer 21'	Report

Brann Stadion, Bergen
Attendance: 8,589
Referee: Alina Peşu (Romania)

13 December 2023
18:45

St. Pölten (Austria)	0–0	(Czech Republic) Slavia Prague
	Report

NÖ Arena, Sankt Pölten
Attendance: 762
Referee: Catarina Campos (Portugal)
13 December 2023
21:00

Lyon (France)	3–1	(Norway) Brann
Diani 6', 48'; Hegerberg 23'	Report	Kielland 73'

Parc Olympique Lyonnais, Décines-Charpieu
Attendance: 6,581
Referee: Marta Huerta de Aza (Spain)

21 December 2023
18:45

Brann (Norway)	2–2	(France) Lyon
Kielland 34'; Gaupset 90+4'	Report	Majri 6'; Hegerberg 13' (pen.)

Åsane Arena, Bergen
Attendance: 3,700
Referee: Volha Blotskaya (Belarus)

18 January 2024 (Note: The match, originally scheduled for 21 December 2023, was postponed due to the 2023 Prague shooting.)
18:45

Slavia Prague (Czech Republic)	1–0	(Austria) St. Pölten
Khýrová 56'	Report

Městský stadion, Mladá Boleslav (Note: Slavia played their two last home matches at Městský stadion in Mladá Boleslav, instead of their regular stadium, Fortuna Arena, in Prague, due to a new turf being laid.)
Attendance: 204
Referee: Ivana Projkovska (North Macedonia)

25 January 2024
18:45

Slavia Prague (Czech Republic)	0–1	(Norway) Brann
	Report	Lukášová 65' (o.g.)

Městský stadion, Mladá Boleslav
Attendance: 464
Referee: Maria Sole Ferrieri Caputi (Italy)
25 January 2024
21:00

St. Pölten (Austria)	0–7	(France) Lyon
	Report	Hegerberg 21', 36'; Däbritz 22', 87'; Gilles 55'; Marozsán 79'; Diani 83'

NÖ Arena, Sankt Pölten
Attendance: 1,098
Referee: Silvia Gasperotti (Italy)

31 January 2024
18:45

Lyon (France)	2–2	(Czech Republic) Slavia Prague
Majri 4'; Bècho 74'	Report	Černá 9'; Gilles 90+1' (o.g.)

Parc Olympique Lyonnais, Décines-Charpieu
Attendance: 10,734
Referee: Kirsty Dowle (England)
31 January 2024
18:45

Brann (Norway)	2–1	(Austria) St. Pölten
Kielland 20'; Eikeland 90+1'	Report	Mattner-Trembleau 7'

Åsane Arena, Bergen
Attendance: 2,738
Referee: Kateryna Monzul (Ukraine)

=== Group C ===
Pos	Team	Pld	W	D	L	GF	GA	GD	Pts	Qualification	PSG	AJA	BAY	ROM
1	(France) Paris Saint-Germain	6	3	1	2	10	8	+2	10	Advance to quarter-finals	—	3–1	0–1	2–1
2	(Netherlands) Ajax	6	3	1	2	7	8	−1	10	Advance to quarter-finals	2–0	—	1–0	2–1
3	(Germany) Bayern Munich	6	1	4	1	8	8	0	7		2–2	1–1	—	2–2
4	(Italy) Roma	6	1	2	3	10	11	−1	5		1–3	3–0	2–2	—

Source: UEFA
Rules for classification: Group stage tiebreakers
15 November 2023
18:45

Bayern Munich (Germany)	2–2	(Italy) Roma
Damnjanović 20'; Linari 45+4' (o.g.)	Report	Viens 58'; Giugliano 90+1'

FC Bayern Campus, Munich
Attendance: 2,500
Referee: Rebecca Welch (England)
15 November 2023
21:00

Ajax (Netherlands)	2–0	(France) Paris Saint-Germain
Hoekstra 34'; Spitse 45+1' (pen.)	Report

Johan Cruyff Arena, Amsterdam
Attendance: 13,106
Referee: Tess Olofsson (Sweden)

23 November 2023
18:45

Paris Saint-Germain (France)	0–1	(Germany) Bayern Munich
	Report	Eriksson 21'

Stade Jean-Bouin, Paris
Attendance: 3,669
Referee: Marta Huerta de Aza (Spain)
23 November 2023
21:00

Roma (Italy)	3–0	(Netherlands) Ajax
Giacinti 5', 14'; Giugliano 47'	Report

Stadio Tre Fontane, Rome
Attendance: 2,583
Referee: Ewa Augustyn (Poland)

14 December 2023
18:45

Bayern Munich (Germany)	1–1	(Netherlands) Ajax
Schüller 2'	Report	Grant 38'

FC Bayern Campus, Munich
Attendance: 2,500
Referee: Kateryna Monzul (Ukraine)
14 December 2023
21:00

Paris Saint-Germain (France)	2–1	(Italy) Roma
Geyoro 45' (pen.); Katoto 46'	Report	Giacinti 58'

Parc des Princes, Paris
Attendance: 4,072
Referee: Iuliana Demetrescu (Romania)

20 December 2023
18:45

Roma (Italy)	1–3	(France) Paris Saint-Germain
Giugliano 88'	Report	Chawinga 26'; Katoto 67'; Albert 78'

Stadio Tre Fontane, Rome
Attendance: 2,626
Referee: Ivana Martinčić (Croatia)
20 December 2023
18:45

Ajax (Netherlands)	1–0	(Germany) Bayern Munich
Leuchter 44'	Report

Johan Cruyff Arena, Amsterdam
Attendance: 20,413
Referee: Cheryl Foster (Wales)

24 January 2024
18:45

Roma (Italy)	2–2	(Germany) Bayern Munich
Giacinti 33'; Giugliano 90+3'	Report	Schüller 87', 90+6'

Stadio Tre Fontane, Rome
Attendance: 2,193
Referee: Frida Klarlund (Denmark)
24 January 2024
21:00

Paris Saint-Germain (France)	3–1	(Netherlands) Ajax
Katoto 7', 25'; Geyoro 40'	Report	Leuchter 31'

Parc des Princes, Paris
Attendance: 6,888
Referee: Rebecca Welch (England)

30 January 2024
21:00

Bayern Munich (Germany)	2–2	(France) Paris Saint-Germain
Gwinn 36'; Lohmann 75'	Report	Chawinga 73'; Stanway 88' (o.g.)

FC Bayern Campus, Munich
Attendance: 4,000
Referee: Ewa Augustyn (Poland)
30 January 2024
21:00

Ajax (Netherlands)	2–1	(Italy) Roma
Hoekstra 45'; Kramžar 84' (o.g.)	Report	Bartoli 32'

Johan Cruyff Arena, Amsterdam
Attendance: 15,500
Referee: Marta Huerta de Aza (Spain)

=== Group D ===
Pos	Team	Pld	W	D	L	GF	GA	GD	Pts	Qualification	CHE	HAC	PFC	RMA
1	(England) Chelsea	6	4	2	0	15	5	+10	14	Advance to quarter-finals	—	0–0	4–1	2–1
2	(Sweden) BK Häcken	6	3	2	1	6	5	+1	11	Advance to quarter-finals	1–3	—	0–0	2–1
3	(France) Paris FC	6	2	1	3	5	11	−6	7		0–4	1–2	—	2–1
4	(Spain) Real Madrid	6	0	1	5	5	10	−5	1		2–2	0–1	0–1	—

Source: UEFA
Rules for classification: Group stage tiebreakers
15 November 2023
18:45

Paris FC (France)	1–2	(Sweden) BK Häcken
Dufour 59' (pen.)	Report	Kafaji 29'; Sandberg 56'

Stade Sébastien Charléty, Paris
Attendance: 1,746
Referee: Catarina Campos (Portugal)
15 November 2023
21:00

Real Madrid (Spain)	2–2	(England) Chelsea
Carmona 10', 79' (pen.)	Report	Charles 41'; Kerr 74'

Alfredo Di Stéfano, Madrid
Attendance: 2,913
Referee: Frida Klarlund (Denmark)

23 November 2023
18:45

BK Häcken (Sweden)	2–1	(Spain) Real Madrid
Kafaji 59'; Kosola 76'	Report	Bruun 10'

Bravida Arena, Gothenburg
Attendance: 4,897
Referee: Ivana Projkovska (North Macedonia)
23 November 2023
21:00

Chelsea (England)	4–1	(France) Paris FC
Kerr 30', 48', 55'; Ingle 90+1'	Report	Gréboval 38'

Stamford Bridge, Fulham
Attendance: 3,450
Referee: Ivana Martinčić (Croatia)

14 December 2023
18:45

Paris FC (France)	2–1	(Spain) Real Madrid
Dufour 4'; Thiney 6'	Report	Møller 53'

Stade Sébastien Charléty, Paris
Attendance: 10,693
Referee: Maria Sole Ferrieri Caputi (Italy)
14 December 2023
21:00

Chelsea (England)	0–0	(Sweden) BK Häcken
	Report

Stamford Bridge, Fulham
Attendance: 3,300
Referee: Esther Staubli (Switzerland)

20 December 2023
21:00

Real Madrid (Spain)	0–1	(France) Paris FC
	Report	Thiney 79' (pen.)

Alfredo Di Stéfano, Madrid
Attendance: 1,596
Referee: Alina Peşu (Romania)
20 December 2023
21:00

BK Häcken (Sweden)	1–3	(England) Chelsea
Larisey 26'	Report	Kerr 14'; Cuthbert 52', 64'

Bravida Arena, Gothenburg
Attendance: 5,566
Referee: Ewa Augustyn (Poland)

24 January 2024
18:45

BK Häcken (Sweden)	0–0	(France) Paris FC
	Report

Bravida Arena, Gothenburg
Attendance: 3,064
Referee: Iuliana Demetrescu (Romania)
24 January 2024
21:00

Chelsea (England)	2–1	(Spain) Real Madrid
Reiten 62' (pen.); Chavas 71' (o.g.)	Report	Athenea 69'

Stamford Bridge, Fulham
Attendance: 11,262
Referee: Catarina Campos (Portugal)

30 January 2024
18:45

Real Madrid (Spain)	0–1	(Sweden) BK Häcken
	Report	Kafaji 63'

Alfredo Di Stéfano, Madrid
Attendance: 862
Referee: Riem Hussein (Germany)
30 January 2024
18:45

Paris FC (France)	0–4	(England) Chelsea
	Report	Kirby 10'; Fishel 37'; Reiten 74'; Mjelde 79'

Stade Sébastien Charléty, Paris
Attendance: 13,274
Referee: Ivana Projkovska (North Macedonia)
