= 2023–24 UEFA Women's Champions League knockout phase =

Tournament details
- Dates: 19 March – 25 May 2024
- Teams: 8

The 2023–24 UEFA Women's Champions League knockout phase started on 19 March 2024 with the quarter-finals and ended with the final on 25 May 2024 at the San Mamés Stadium in Bilbao, Spain, to decide the champions of the 2023–24 UEFA Women's Champions League.

== Schedule ==
The schedule of the competition was as follows (all draws were held at the UEFA headquarters in Nyon, Switzerland).

| Round | Draw date | First leg | Second leg |
|---|---|---|---|
| Quarter-finals | 6 February 2024 | 19–20 March 2024 | 27–28 March 2024 |
| Semi-finals | 6 February 2024 | 20–21 April 2024 | 27–28 April 2024 |
| Final | 6 February 2024 | 25 May 2024 at San Mamés Stadium in Bilbao | |

== Qualified teams ==
The knockout phase involved the eight teams which qualified as winners and runners-up of each of the four groups in the group stage.

| Group | Winners (seeded in quarter finals draw) | Runners-up (unseeded in quarter finals draw) |
|---|---|---|
| A | (Spain) Barcelona | (Portugal) Benfica |
| B | (France) Lyon | (Norway) Brann |
| C | (France) Paris Saint-Germain | (Netherlands) Ajax |
| D | (England) Chelsea | (Sweden) BK Häcken |

== Bracket ==
Quarter-finals
(Norway) Brann | 1 | 1 | 2
(Spain) Barcelona | 2 | 3 | 5
(Netherlands) Ajax | 0 | 1 | 1
(England) Chelsea | 3 | 1 | 4
(Portugal) Benfica | 1 | 1 | 2
(France) Lyon | 2 | 4 | 6
(Sweden) Häcken | 1 | 0 | 1
(France) Paris Saint-Germain | 2 | 3 | 5

Semi-finals
(Spain) Barcelona | 0 | 2 | 2
(England) Chelsea | 1 | 0 | 1
(France) Lyon | 3 | 2 | 5
(France) Paris Saint-Germain | 2 | 1 | 3

Final
25 May – Bilbao
(Spain) Barcelona | 2
(France) Lyon | 0

== Quarter-finals ==
The draw for the quarter-finals was held on 6 February 2024.

=== Summary ===
The first legs were played on 19 and 20 March, and the second legs on 27 and 28 March 2024.

| Team 1 | Agg. | Team 2 | 1st leg | 2nd leg |
|---|---|---|---|---|
| Brann (Norway) | 2–5 | (Spain) Barcelona | 1–2 | 1–3 |
| Benfica (Portugal) | 2–6 | (France) Lyon | 1–2 | 1–4 |
| Ajax (Netherlands) | 1–4 | (England) Chelsea | 0–3 | 1–1 |
| Häcken (Sweden) | 1–5 | (France) Paris Saint-Germain | 1–2 | 0–3 |

=== Matches ===
20 March 2024
21:00

| Brann (Norway) | 1–2 | (Spain) Barcelona |
|---|---|---|
| Kvamme 39' | Report | Graham Hansen 9'; Paralluelo 72' |

Åsane Arena, Bergen
Attendance: 3,300
Referee: Alina Peşu (Romania)
28 March 2024
18:45

| Barcelona (Spain) | 3–1 | (Norway) Brann |
|---|---|---|
| Bonmatí 24'; Rolfö 56'; Guijarro 88' | Report | Svendheim 70' |

Johan Cruyff Stadium, Sant Joan Despí
Attendance: 5,510
Referee: Ivana Martinčić (Croatia)

Barcelona won 5–2 on aggregate.

19 March 2024
21:00

| Benfica (Portugal) | 1–2 | (France) Lyon |
|---|---|---|
| Faria 43' | Report | Cascarino 63'; Däbritz 79' |

Estádio da Luz, Lisbon
Attendance: 19,736
Referee: Ewa Augustyn (Poland)
27 March 2024
18:45

| Lyon (France) | 4–1 | (Portugal) Benfica |
|---|---|---|
| Cascarino 43', 51'; Diani 90+1', 90+6' | Report | Alidou 45' |

Parc Olympique Lyonnais, Décines-Charpieu
Attendance: 21,239
Referee: Cheryl Foster (Wales)

Lyon won 6–2 on aggregate.

19 March 2024
18:45

| Ajax (Netherlands) | 0–3 | (England) Chelsea |
|---|---|---|
| | Report | James 19'; Nüsken 44', 83' |

Johan Cruyff Arena, Amsterdam
Attendance: 35,997
Referee: Maria Sole Ferrieri Caputi (Italy)
27 March 2024
21:00

| Chelsea (England) | 1–1 | (Netherlands) Ajax |
|---|---|---|
| Ramírez 33' | Report | Grant 65' |

Stamford Bridge, Fulham
Attendance: 11,820
Referee: Tess Olofsson (Sweden)

Chelsea won 4–1 on aggregate.

20 March 2024
18:45

| Häcken (Sweden) | 1–2 | (France) Paris Saint-Germain |
|---|---|---|
| Kafaji 42' | Report | Gaetino 23'; Chawinga 74' |

Hisingen Arena, Gothenburg
Attendance: 6,316
Referee: Frida Klarlund (Denmark)
28 March 2024
21:00

| Paris Saint-Germain (France) | 3–0 | (Sweden) Häcken |
|---|---|---|
| Chawinga 27'; Albert 70'; Katoto 74' | Report |

Parc des Princes, Paris
Attendance: 11,674
Referee: Rebecca Welch (England)

Paris Saint-Germain won 5–1 on aggregate.

== Semi-finals ==
The draw for the semi-finals was held on 6 February 2024 (after the quarter-final draw).

=== Summary ===
The first legs were played on 20 April, and the second legs on 27 and 28 April 2024.

| Team 1 | Agg. | Team 2 | 1st leg | 2nd leg |
|---|---|---|---|---|
| Barcelona (Spain) | 2–1 | (England) Chelsea | 0–1 | 2–0 |
| Lyon (France) | 5–3 | (France) Paris Saint-Germain | 3–2 | 2–1 |

=== Matches ===
20 April 2024
13:30

| Barcelona (Spain) | 0–1 | (England) Chelsea |
|---|---|---|
| | Report | Cuthbert 40' |

Estadi Olímpic Lluís Companys, Barcelona
Attendance: 36,428
Referee: Stéphanie Frappart (France)
27 April 2024
18:30

| Chelsea (England) | 0–2 | (Spain) Barcelona |
|---|---|---|
| | Report | Bonmatí 25'; Rolfö 75' (pen.) |

Stamford Bridge, Fulham
Attendance: 39,398
Referee: Iuliana Demetrescu (Romania)

Barcelona won 2–1 on aggregate.

20 April 2024
19:00

| Lyon (France) | 3–2 | (France) Paris Saint-Germain |
|---|---|---|
| Diani 80'; Dumornay 85'; Majri 86' | Report | Katoto 44', 48' |

Parc Olympique Lyonnais, Décines-Charpieu
Attendance: 38,466
Referee: Marta Huerta de Aza (Spain)
28 April 2024
16:00

| Paris Saint-Germain (France) | 1–2 | (France) Lyon |
|---|---|---|
| Chawinga 41' | Report | Bacha 3'; Dumornay 81' |

Parc des Princes, Paris
Attendance: 29,400
Referee: Ivana Projkovska (North Macedonia)

Lyon won 5–3 on aggregate.

== Final ==
The final was played on 25 May 2024 at the San Mamés Stadium in Bilbao. A draw was held on 6 February 2024 (after the quarter-final and semi-final draws), to determine which semi-final winner was designated as the "home" team for administrative purposes.

25 May 2024
18:00

| Barcelona (Spain) | 2–0 | (France) Lyon |
|---|---|---|
| Bonmatí 63'; Putellas 90+5' | Report |

San Mamés Stadium, Bilbao
Attendance: 50,827
Referee: Rebecca Welch (England)
