= Monika Mularczyk =

Polish football referee (born 1980)

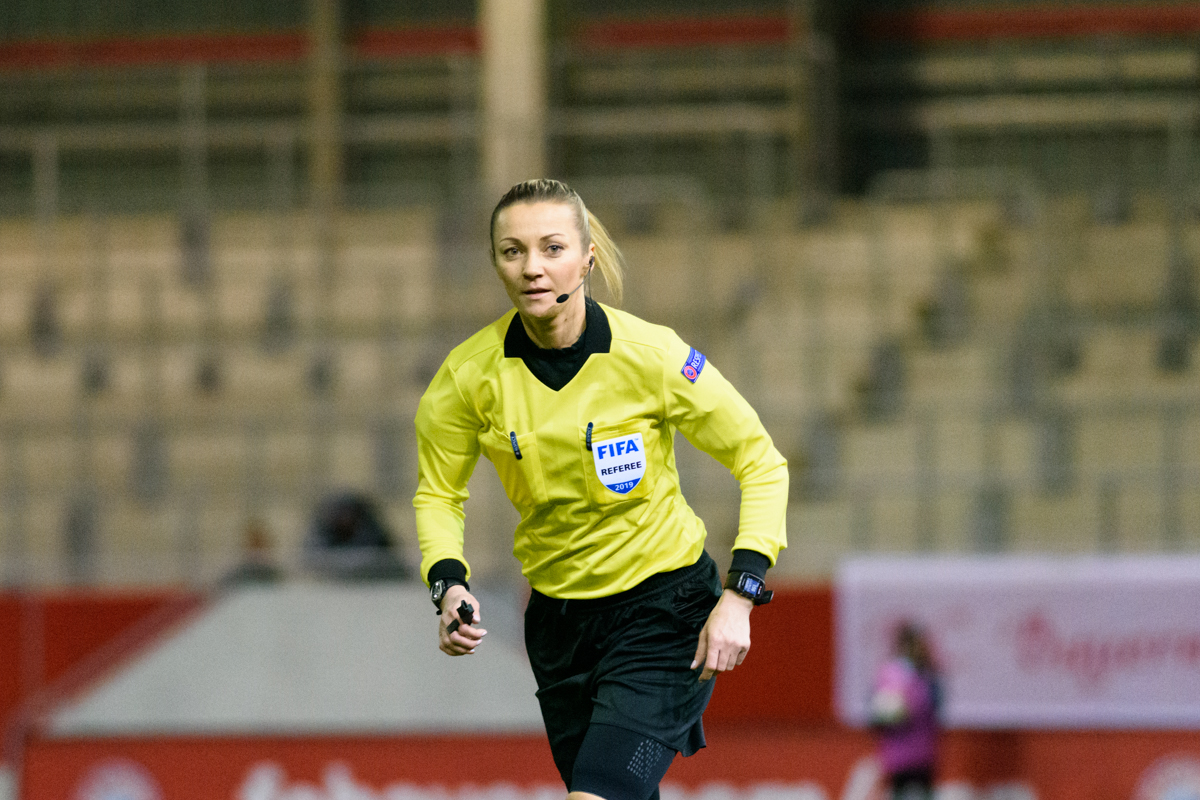
- Full name: Monika Mularczyk
- Born: 28 June 1980 (age 46); Skierniewice, Poland
- Other occupation: Physical Education Teacher
Years		Role

International
Years	League	Role
2008–	FIFA listed	Referee
2015-	UEFA Elite Group	Referee

Monika Mularczyk (born 28 June 1980) is a Polish football referee.

She has been on the FIFA International Referees List since 2008.

In January 2015 she was promoted to the UEFA Elite Group. In 2017 she was selected as one of the match officials for the UEFA Women's European Championships held in the Netherlands. She became the first Polish female referee to be selected for a senior international tournament.

== Notable international tournaments ==
- 2013 UEFA Women's Under-19 Championship (includes the gold medal match)
- 2016 FIFA U-20 Women's World Cup
- UEFA Women's Euro 2017

== Personal life ==
She is married and has a son. Her husband is also a football referee.
