= Rebecca Welch =

English football referee

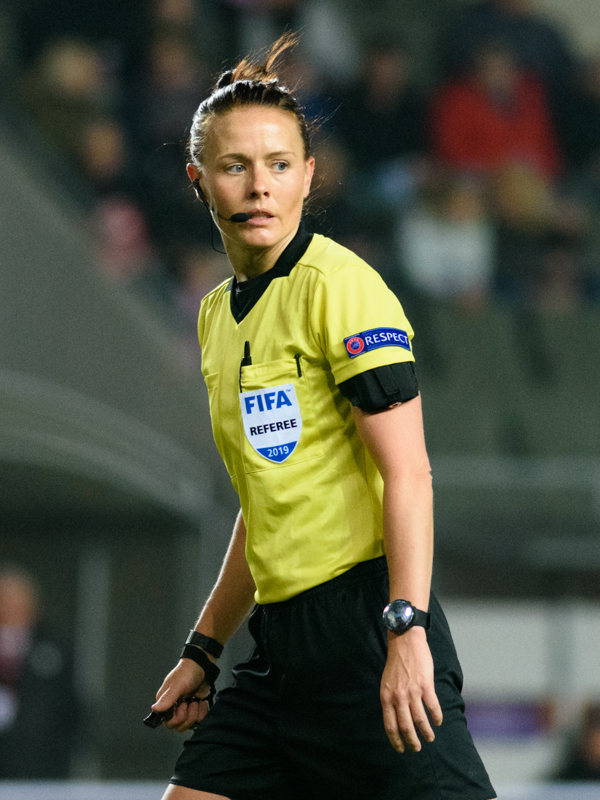
- Welch in 2019
- Full name: Rebecca Welch
- Born: 1 December 1983 (age 42); Washington, Tyne and Wear, England

Domestic
Years	League	Role

International
Years	League	Role
2015–2024	FIFA listed	Referee

Rebecca Welch (born 1 December 1983) is an English former professional football referee.

Born in Washington, Tyne and Wear, she became the first woman to referee an English Football League match, when she did so for a League Two match between Harrogate Town and Port Vale in 2021. In December 2023, Welch became the first woman to referee a Premier League match.

== Career ==
Having worked as an administrator with the NHS Business Services Authority, Welch became a football referee in 2010, but continued to work in her NHS post until becoming a full-time referee in 2019. She had played football from a young age, and studied to be a referee with Durham County Football Association. Her first two matches were women's university games, followed by a Sunday League match in Sunderland, something she has described as being "a completely different kettle of fish" compared to the university games.

During her career as a referee she has officiated at games in the Women's Super League, and was referee at the 2017 and 2020 Women's FA Cup finals. She also officiated at the 2020 FA Women's Community Shield. Since the 2018–19 National League season, she has refereed at several men's National League matches. In December 2020, she was added to UEFA's elite women's list, joining other female football officials to referee at international games, including Stéphanie Frappart of France and Bibiana Steinhaus of Germany.

Welch's appointment to referee the Harrogate v Port Vale match was announced by the Football Association on 30 March 2021. The announcement made Welch the first woman to be appointed to referee an English Football League game, though not the first woman to referee during a game. Amy Fearn was substituted to referee the final 20 minutes of a match between Coventry City and Nottingham Forest in February 2010 when the original referee was taken off due to injury.

On 29 December 2021, it was announced that Welch would be the first woman to officiate a third round men's FA Cup match. The game in question, between Birmingham City and Plymouth Argyle, was played on 8 January 2022.

In July 2022, Welch refereed at the Women's European Championships. She oversaw the group matches between France and Italy in Rotherham and Denmark and Spain in London, as well as the quarter-final between Germany and Austria in London.

Across July and August 2023, Welch officiated at the Women's World Cup. She oversaw the group matches between Colombia and South Korea in Sydney and Portugal and the United States in Auckland, as well as the round of 16 match between Australia and Denmark in Sydney.

In November 2023, Welch was allegedly the subject of misogynistic chanting during a match between Birmingham City and Sheffield Wednesday; two 17 year olds were subsequently arrested.

On 23 December 2023, Welch became the first woman to referee in the Premier League, officiating in a fixture between Fulham and Burnley. She was congratulated by the Burnley manager, Vincent Kompany, after the match. On 8 March 2024, it was announced that Welch would be inducted into the English Football Hall of Fame.

In May 2024, Welch adjudicated the Women's Champions League final between Barcelona and Lyon at the San Mamés Stadium in Bilbao. She was assisted by compatriots Natalie Aspinall and Emily Carney.

Across July and August 2024, Welch officiated at the Olympics, overseeing the group matches between Brazil and Japan in Paris and Colombia and Canada in Nice, as well as the semi-final between Brazil and Spain in Marseille.

In August 2024, the PGMOL announced that Welch was to retire from officiating and that she would become their manager of the Select Group Women’s Professional Game.

In December 2024, Welch was inducted into the WSL Hall of Fame alongside players Gilly Flaherty, Alex Scott and Steph Houghton. This made her the first official to be inducted into the WSL Hall of Fame.

== List of major matches refereed ==
Date	Match	Tournament	Venue	Result	Ref
25 May 2024	Barcelona vs. Lyon	2024 UEFA Women's Champions League final	San Mamés Stadium, Bilbao	2–0	

== Honours ==
- IFFHS World's Best Woman Referee: 2024
- English Football Hall of Fame: 2024
