= 2023–24 UEFA Youth League knockout phase =

European football tournament

The 2023–24 UEFA Youth League knockout phase began on 6 February 2024 with the play-off round and concluded with the final on 22 April 2024 at Colovray Stadium in Nyon, Switzerland, to decide the champions of the 2023–24 UEFA Youth League.

Times are CET/CEST, (Note: CET (UTC+1) for dates up to 13 March 2024 (up to quarter-finals), and CEST (UTC+2) for dates thereafter (semi-finals and final).) as listed by UEFA (local times, if different, are in parentheses).

== Qualified teams ==
Group	Winners (enter round of 16)	Runners-up (enter play-offs as away team)
A	(Denmark) Copenhagen	(Germany) Bayern Munich
B	(France) Lens	(Spain) Sevilla
C	(Spain) Real Madrid	(Portugal) Braga
D	(Austria) Red Bull Salzburg	(Italy) Inter Milan
E	(Netherlands) Feyenoord	(Spain) Atlético Madrid
F	(Italy) Milan	(Germany) Borussia Dortmund
G	(England) Manchester City	(Germany) RB Leipzig
H	(Portugal) Porto	(Spain) Barcelona

Domestic Champions Path

Second round winners
(enter play-offs as home team)
(Denmark) Midtjylland
(France) Nantes
(Netherlands) AZ
(Slovakia) Žilina
(Switzerland) Basel
(Greece) Olympiacos
(Germany) Mainz 05
(Serbia) Partizan

== Schedule ==
Knockout phase schedule
Phase	Round	Draw date	Match dates
Knockout phase	Knockout round play-offs	19 December 2023	6–7 February 2024
Knockout phase	Round of 16	9 February 2024	27–28 February 2024
Knockout phase	Quarter-finals	9 February 2024	12–13 March 2024
Knockout phase	Semi-finals	9 February 2024	19 April 2024 at Colovray Stadium, Nyon
Knockout phase	Final	9 February 2024	22 April 2024 at Colovray Stadium, Nyon

== Bracket ==
Knockout round play-offs
(Switzerland) Basel	0
(Germany) Bayern Munich	2
(Greece) Olympiacos (p)	0 (6)
(Italy) Inter Milan	0 (5)
(France) Nantes (p)	3 (3)
(Spain) Sevilla	3 (2)
(Slovakia) Žilina	2
(Germany) Borussia Dortmund	1
(Germany) Mainz 05 (p)	2 (6)
(Spain) Barcelona	2 (5)
(Netherlands) AZ	1
(Spain) Atlético Madrid	0
(Serbia) Partizan	0
(Portugal) Braga	2
(Denmark) Midtjylland	1 (2)
(Germany) RB Leipzig (p)	1 (4)

Round of 16
(Germany) Bayern Munich	3
(Netherlands) Feyenoord	2
(Greece) Olympiacos (p)	2 (4)
(France) Lens	2 (2)
(Austria) Red Bull Salzburg	0
(France) Nantes	1
(Slovakia) Žilina	1 (2)
(Denmark) Copenhagen (p)	1 (4)
(Germany) Mainz 05	2
(England) Manchester City	1
(Netherlands) AZ	1 (3)
(Portugal) Porto (p)	1 (4)
(Italy) Milan (p)	2 (4)
(Portugal) Braga	2 (2)
(Spain) Real Madrid	2
(Germany) RB Leipzig	0

Quarter-finals
(Germany) Bayern Munich	1
(Greece) Olympiacos	3
(France) Nantes (p)	3 (5)
(Denmark) Copenhagen	3 (4)
(Germany) Mainz 05	1
(Portugal) Porto	4
(Italy) Milan (p)	1 (4)
(Spain) Real Madrid	1 (3)

Semi-finals
19 April – Nyon
(Greece) Olympiacos (p)	0 (3)
(France) Nantes	0 (1)
19 April – Nyon
(Portugal) Porto	2 (3)
(Italy) Milan (p)	2 (4)

Final
22 April – Nyon
(Greece) Olympiacos	3
(Italy) Milan	0

== Knockout round play-offs ==
=== Summary ===
The eight second round winners from the Domestic Champions Path were drawn against the eight group runners-up from the UEFA Champions League Path, with the teams from the Domestic Champions Path hosting the match. Teams from the same association could not be drawn against each other.

The draw was conducted on 19 December 2023 at the UEFA headquarters in Nyon. The knockout round play-offs were played over one leg on 6 and 7 February 2024.

Home team	Score	Away team
Basel (Switzerland)	0–2	(Germany) Bayern Munich
Partizan (Serbia)	0–2	(Portugal) Braga
Olympiacos (Greece)	0–0 (6–5 p)	(Italy) Inter Milan
Žilina (Slovakia)	2–1	(Germany) Borussia Dortmund
Nantes (France)	3–3 (3–2 p)	(Spain) Sevilla
Mainz 05 (Germany)	2–2 (6–5 p)	(Spain) Barcelona
Midtjylland (Denmark)	1–1 (2–4 p)	(Germany) RB Leipzig
AZ (Netherlands)	1–0	(Spain) Atlético Madrid

=== Matches ===
7 February 2024
18:00

Basel (Switzerland)	0–2	(Germany) Bayern Munich
	Report	Zvonarek 31', 90+4'

Leichtathletik Stadion St. Jakob, Basel
Attendance: 4,523
Referee: Ante Čulina (Croatia)

7 February 2024
15:00

Partizan (Serbia)	0–2	(Portugal) Braga
	Report	Fernandes 64'; Duarte 90+1'

Partizan Stadium, Belgrade
Attendance: 1,409
Referee: Lothar D'hondt (Belgium)

7 February 2024
14:00

Olympiacos (Greece)	0–0	(Italy) Inter Milan
	Report
Penalties
Mouzakitis (penalty scored); Bakoulas (penalty scored); Kostoulas (penalty scored); Liatsikouras (penalty scored); Tanoulis (penalty scored); Kostoulas (penalty scored)	6–5	(penalty scored) Stanković; (penalty scored) Di Maggio; (penalty scored) Owusu; (penalty scored) Stante; (penalty scored) Sarr; (penalty missed) Cocchi

Karaiskakis Stadium, Piraeus
Attendance: 4,000
Referee: Miguel Nogueira (Portugal)

7 February 2024
16:30

Žilina (Slovakia)	2–1	(Germany) Borussia Dortmund
Vaľko 48'; Pekelský 89'	Report	Brunner 45'

Štadión MŠK Žilina, Žilina
Attendance: 10,451
Referee: Joonas Jaanovits (Estonia)

7 February 2024
19:00

Nantes (France)	3–3	(Spain) Sevilla
Martínez 51' (o.g.); Mafoumbi 63', 66'	Report	Salguero 69'; Dugard 75' (o.g.); Collado 78' (pen.)
Penalties
Touré (penalty scored); Mongo (penalty scored); Assoumani (penalty scored); Gomes (penalty missed)	3–2	(penalty missed) Collado; (penalty scored) Jalade; (penalty scored) Sow; (penalty missed) López; (penalty missed) Martínez

Stade de la Beaujoire, Nantes
Attendance: 13,377
Referee: Oliver Reitala (Finland)

6 February 2024
18:00

Mainz 05 (Germany)	2–2	(Spain) Barcelona
Gleiber 25'; Schulz 74'	Report	Darvich 34'; Rodríguez 48'
Penalties
Schulz (penalty scored); Dal (penalty scored); Dardari (penalty scored); Amann (penalty scored); Gleiber (penalty missed); Kalemba (penalty scored); Touré (penalty scored)	6–5	(penalty scored) Navarro; (penalty scored) Fariñas; (penalty scored) Rodríguez; (penalty missed) Bernal; (penalty scored) Hernández; (penalty scored) Gistau; (penalty missed) Prim

Bruchwegstadion, Mainz
Attendance: 7,143
Referee: Mikkel Redder (Denmark)

6 February 2024
14:00

Midtjylland (Denmark)	1–1	(Germany) RB Leipzig
Krüger-Johnsen 13'	Report	Norbye 90+5'
Penalties
Bjerge (penalty missed); Johannesen (penalty scored); Kristjánsson (penalty missed); Jørgensen (penalty scored)	2–4	(penalty scored) Kühnhardt; (penalty scored) Damala; (penalty scored) Schößler; (penalty scored) Osawe

MCH Arena, Herning
Attendance: 756
Referee: Antoni Bandić (Bosnia and Herzegovina)

7 February 2024
16:00

AZ (Netherlands)	1–0	(Spain) Atlético Madrid
Van den Ban 25'	Report

AZ Training Centre, Wijdewormer
Attendance: 1,837
Referee: Chrysovalantis Theouli (Cyprus)

== Round of 16 ==
=== Summary ===
The draw was conducted on 9 February 2024 at 13:00 CET in the UEFA headquarters in Nyon. The round of 16 was played over one leg on 27 and 28 February 2024.

Home team	Score	Away team
AZ (Netherlands)	1–1 (3–4 p)	(Portugal) Porto
Milan (Italy)	2–2 (4–2 p)	(Portugal) Braga
Real Madrid (Spain)	2–0	(Germany) RB Leipzig
Žilina (Slovakia)	1–1 (2–4 p)	(Denmark) Copenhagen
Red Bull Salzburg (Austria)	0–1	(France) Nantes
Olympiacos (Greece)	2–2 (4–2 p)	(France) Lens
Bayern Munich (Germany)	3–2	(Netherlands) Feyenoord
Mainz 05 (Germany)	2–1	(England) Manchester City

=== Matches ===
27 February 2024
16:00

AZ (Netherlands)	1–1	(Portugal) Porto
Van den Ban 34'	Report	Ribeiro 90+3'
Penalties
Kwakman (penalty scored); Dekkers (penalty scored); Atikallah (penalty missed); Smits (penalty scored); Addai (penalty missed)	3–4	(penalty scored) Brás; (penalty missed) Candé; (penalty scored) Martins; (penalty scored) Teixeira; (penalty scored) Sousa

AZ Training Centre, Wijdewormer
Attendance: 1,980
Referee: Ivana Projkovska (North Macedonia)

28 February 2024
14:30

Milan (Italy)	2–2	(Portugal) Braga
Sia 24'; Zeroli 71'	Report	Rodrigues 66'; Furtado 90+4'
Penalties
Bartesaghi (penalty scored); Simić (penalty scored); Sia (penalty scored); Malaspina (penalty missed); Zeroli (penalty scored)	4–2	(penalty scored) Vasconcelos; (penalty missed) Kelvin; (penalty scored) Chissumba; (penalty missed) Rodrigues

Centro Sportivo Vismara, Milan
Attendance: 547
Referee: Miloš Milanović (Serbia)

28 February 2024
18:00

Real Madrid (Spain)	2–0	(Germany) RB Leipzig
García 24'; Perea 81'	Report

Alfredo Di Stéfano Stadium, Madrid
Attendance: 1,275
Referee: Vassilis Fotias (Greece)

27 February 2024
16:30

Žilina (Slovakia)	1–1	(Denmark) Copenhagen
Sauer 10'	Report	Chiakha 6'
Penalties
Mynar (penalty scored); Valko (penalty missed); Pekelsky (penalty scored); Atanasijević (penalty missed)	2–4	(penalty scored) Birch; (penalty scored) Tchicamboud; (penalty scored) Németh; (penalty scored) Blicher

Štadión MŠK Žilina, Žilina
Attendance: 10,785
Referee: Joey Kooij (Netherlands)

28 February 2024
15:00

Red Bull Salzburg (Austria)	0–1	(France) Nantes
	Report	Gomes 19'

Red Bull Akademie, Salzburg
Attendance: 425
Referee: Mohammad Usman Aslam (Norway)

28 February 2024
14:00

Olympiacos (Greece)	2–2	(France) Lens
Kostoulas 58' (pen.); Pnevmonidis 62'	Report	Sishuba 19'; Fofana 52'
Penalties
Bakoulas (penalty scored); Kostoulas (penalty scored); Liatsikouras (penalty scored); Tanoulis (penalty scored)	4–2	(penalty scored) Sishuba; (penalty scored) Ganiou; (penalty missed) Diliwidi; (penalty missed) Bermont

Karaiskakis Stadium, Piraeus
Attendance: 7,000
Referee: David Šmajc (Slovenia)

28 February 2024
16:00

Bayern Munich (Germany)	3–2	(Netherlands) Feyenoord
Wimmer 20'; Fernández 28'; Demircan 45'	Report	Rust 52'; Giersthove 55'

FC Bayern Campus, Munich
Attendance: 700
Referee: Robert Ian Jenkins (Wales)

27 February 2024
18:00

Mainz 05 (Germany)	2–1	(England) Manchester City
Muller 16'; Schulz 52' (pen.)	Report	Oboavwoduo 45+1'

Bruchwegstadion, Mainz
Attendance: 7,143
Referee: Atilla Karaoglan (Turkey)

== Quarter-finals ==
=== Summary ===
The draw was conducted on 9 February 2024 at 13:00 CET in the UEFA headquarters in Nyon. The quarter-finals were played over one leg on 12 and 13 March 2024.

Home team	Score	Away team
Mainz 05 (Germany)	1–4	(Portugal) Porto
Nantes (France)	3–3 (5–4 p)	(Denmark) Copenhagen
Bayern Munich (Germany)	1–3	(Greece) Olympiacos
Milan (Italy)	1–1 (4–3 p)	(Spain) Real Madrid

=== Matches ===
13 March 2024
19:00

Mainz 05 (Germany)	1–4	(Portugal) Porto
Engel 87'	Report	Teixeira 18'; Mora 32', 73'; Candé 83'

Bruchwegstadion, Mainz
Attendance: 7,143
Referee: Goga Kikacheishvili (Georgia)

12 March 2024
19:00

Nantes (France)	3–3	(Denmark) Copenhagen
Assoumani 12'; Mafoumbi 54'; Leroux 64'	Report	Højlund 18' (pen.); Németh 31'; Chiakha 33'
Penalties
Assoumani (penalty scored); Acapandié (penalty scored); Mongo (penalty missed); Camara (penalty scored); Leroux (penalty scored); Nzita (penalty missed); Gomes (penalty scored)	5–4	(penalty scored) Froholdt; (penalty scored) Bidstrup; (penalty scored) Németh; (penalty missed) Andrew; (penalty scored) Chiakha; (penalty missed) Glindtvad; (penalty missed) Halsgaard

Stade de la Beaujoire, Nantes
Attendance: 19,301
Referee: Elchin Masiyev (Azerbaijan)

12 March 2024
17:00

Bayern Munich (Germany)	1–3	(Greece) Olympiacos
Ramsak 63'	Report	Mouzakitis 32'; Papakanellos 37'; Kostoulas 40'

FC Bayern Campus, Munich
Attendance: 1,486
Referee: Yigal Frid (Israel)

13 March 2024
17:00

Milan (Italy)	1–1	(Spain) Real Madrid
Sia 51'	Report	García 33' (pen.)
Penalties
Bartesaghi (penalty scored); Simić (penalty scored); Simmelhack (penalty scored); Scotti (penalty missed); Zeroli (penalty scored)	4–3	(penalty scored) Perea; (penalty missed) Yáñez; (penalty scored) Palacios; (penalty missed) Fortuny; (penalty scored) García

Centro Sportivo Vismara, Milan
Attendance: 580
Referee: Sven Jablonski (Germany)

== Semi-finals ==
=== Summary ===
The draw was conducted on 9 February 2024 at 13:00 CET in the UEFA headquarters in Nyon. The semi-finals were played over one leg on 19 April 2024.

Team 1	Score	Team 2
Olympiacos (Greece)	0–0 (3–1 p)	(France) Nantes
Porto (Portugal)	2–2 (3–4 p)	(Italy) Milan

=== Matches ===
19 April 2024
14:00

Olympiacos (Greece)	0–0	(France) Nantes
	Report
Penalties
Mouzakitis (penalty missed); Bakoulas (penalty scored); Kostoulas (penalty scored); Liatsikouras (penalty scored)	3–1	(penalty missed) Letoux; (penalty missed) Acapandié; (penalty scored) Touré; (penalty missed) Leroux

Colovray Stadium, Nyon
Attendance: 2,515
Referee: Christian-Petru Ciochirca (Austria)

19 April 2024
18:00

Porto (Portugal)	2–2	(Italy) Milan
Meireles 41' (pen.); Brás 65'	Report	Scotti 12'; Simmelhack 90+3'
Penalties
Meireles (penalty missed); Brás (penalty scored); Martins (penalty missed); Fernandes (penalty scored); Sousa (penalty scored)	3–4	(penalty scored) Bonomi; (penalty missed) Simić; (penalty scored) Simmelhack; (penalty scored) Liberali; (penalty scored) Zeroli

Colovray Stadium, Nyon
Attendance: 2,708
Referee: Atilla Karaoglan (Turkey)

== Final ==
The final was played on 22 April 2024 at Colovray Stadium, Nyon.

22 April 2024
18:00

Olympiacos (Greece)	3–0	(Italy) Milan
Mouzakitis 60' (pen.); Papakanellos 61'; Bakoulas 66'	Report

Colovray Stadium, Nyon
Attendance: 2,026
Referee: John Brooks (England)
