= 2023–24 in Swiss football =

Football in Switzerland
- Season: 2023–24

The following is a summary of the 2023–24 season of competitive football in Switzerland.

== National teams ==
=== Men's national team ===
==== Friendlies ====
23 March 2024	Denmark	0–0	Switzerland	Copenhagen, Denmark
20:00 UTC+1				Stadium: Parken Stadium

26 March 2024	Republic of Ireland	0–1	Switzerland	Dublin, Ireland
19:45 UTC+0				Stadium: Aviva Stadium

4 June 2024	Switzerland	4–0	Estonia	Lucerne, Switzerland
20:15 UTC+2	Zuber 20'; Amdouni 47'; Elvedi 63'; Shaqiri 70' (pen.)	Report		Stadium: Swissporarena; Attendance: 14,473; Referee: Kyriakos Athanasiou (Cyprus)

8 June 2024	Switzerland	1–1	Austria	St. Gallen, Switzerland
18:00 UTC+2	Widmer 26'	Report	Baumgartner 5'	Stadium: Kybunpark; Referee: Maria Sole Ferrieri Caputi (Italy)

==== UEFA Euro 2024 qualifying ====
Pos	Team	Pld	W	D	L	GF	GA	GD	Pts	Qualification	(Romania)	(Switzerland)	(Israel)	(Belarus)	(Kosovo)	(Andorra)
1	Romania	10	6	4	0	16	5	+11	22	Qualify for final tournament	—	1–0	1–1	2–1	2–0	4–0
2	Switzerland	10	4	5	1	22	11	+11	17	Qualify for final tournament	2–2	—	3–0	3–3	1–1	3–0
3	Israel	10	4	3	3	11	11	0	15	Advance to play-offs via Nations League	1–2	1–1	—	1–0	1–1	2–1
4	Belarus	10	3	3	4	9	14	−5	12		0–0	0–5	1–2	—	2–1	1–0
5	Kosovo	10	2	5	3	10	10	0	11		0–0	2–2	1–0	0–1	—	1–1
6	Andorra	10	0	2	8	3	20	−17	2		0–2	1–2	0–2	0–0	0–3	—

Source: UEFA
Rules for classification: Qualification tiebreakers

9 September 2023	Kosovo	2–2	Switzerland	Pristina, Kosovo
20:45 UTC+2	Muriqi 65', 90+4'	Report	Freuler 14'; Am. Rrahmani 79' (o.g.)	Stadium: Fadil Vokrri Stadium; Attendance: 12,700; Referee: Jakob Kehlet (Denmark)

12 September 2023	Switzerland	3–0	Andorra	Sion, Switzerland
20:45 UTC+2	Itten 49'; Xhaka 84'; Shaqiri 90+3' (pen.)	Report		Stadium: Stade Tourbillon; Attendance: 9,000; Referee: Elchin Masiyev (Azerbaijan)

15 October 2023	Switzerland	3–3	Belarus	St. Gallen, Switzerland
18:00 UTC+2	Shaqiri 28'; Akanji 89'; Amdouni 90'	Report	Ebong 61'; Polyakov 69'; Antilevsky 84'	Stadium: Kybunpark; Attendance: 17,000; Referee: João Pinheiro (Portugal)

15 November 2023 (Note: The Israel v Switzerland match, originally scheduled to be played on 12 October 2023, was postponed to 15 November 2023 due to the Gaza−Israel conflict.)	Israel	1–1	Switzerland	Felcsút (Hungary) (Note: Due to the Gaza war, Israel play their remaining home matches at a neutral venue.)
21:45 UTC+3	Weissman 88'	Report	Vargas 36'	Stadium: Pancho Aréna; Attendance: 2,024; Referee: Anthony Taylor (England)

18 November 2023	Switzerland	1–1	Kosovo	Basel, Switzerland
20:45 UTC+1		Report		Stadium: St. Jakob-Park

21 November 2023	Romania	1–0	Switzerland	Bucharest, Romania
21:45 UTC+2		Report		Stadium: Arena Națională

==== UEFA Euro 2024 ====
===== Group A =====
Pos	Team	Pld	W	D	L	GF	GA	GD	Pts	Qualification
1	Germany (H)	3	2	1	0	8	2	+6	7	Advance to knockout stage
2	Switzerland	3	1	2	0	5	3	+2	5	Advance to knockout stage
3	Hungary	3	1	0	2	2	5	−3	3	
4	Scotland	3	0	1	2	2	7	−5	1	

Source: UEFA
(H) Hosts

15 June 2024	Hungary	1–3	Switzerland	Cologne, Germany
15:00 UTC+2	Varga 66'	Report	Duah 12'; Aebischer 45'; Embolo 90+3'	Stadium: RheinEnergieStadion; Attendance: 41,676; Referee: Slavko Vinčić (Slovenia)

19 June 2024	Scotland	1–1	Switzerland	Cologne, Germany
21:00 UTC+2		Report		Stadium: RheinEnergieStadion

23 June 2024	Switzerland	1–1	Germany	Frankfurt, Germany
21:00 UTC+2	Ndoye 28'	Report	Füllkrug 90+2'	Stadium: Waldstadion

===== Knockout stage =====
29 June 2024 R16	Switzerland	2–0	Italy	Berlin, Germany
18:00		Report		Stadium: Olympiastadion

=== Women's national team ===
==== Friendlies ====
5 July 2023	Switzerland	0–0	Morocco	Winterthur, Switzerland
				Stadium: Schützenwiese

23 February 2024	Poland	1–4	Switzerland

27 February 2024	Poland	1–0	Switzerland

==== World Cup ====
===== Group A =====
Pos	Team	Pld	W	D	L	GF	GA	GD	Pts	Qualification
1	Switzerland	3	1	2	0	2	0	+2	5	Advance to knockout stage
2	Norway	3	1	1	1	6	1	+5	4	Advance to knockout stage
3	New Zealand (H)	3	1	1	1	1	1	0	4	
4	Philippines	3	1	0	2	1	8	−7	3	

Source: FIFA
Rules for classification: Group stage tiebreakers
(H) Hosts

21 July 2023	Philippines	0–2	Switzerland	Dunedin, New Zealand
		Report	Bachmann 45' (pen.); Piubel 64'	Stadium: Forsyth Barr Stadium; Attendance: 13,711; Referee: Vincentia Amedome (Togo)

25 July 2023	Switzerland	0–0	Norway	Hamilton, New Zealand
		Report		Stadium: Waikato Stadium; Attendance: 10,769; Referee: Stéphanie Frappart (France)

30 July 2023	Switzerland	0–0	New Zealand	Dunedin, New Zealand
		Report		Stadium: Forsyth Barr Stadium; Attendance: 25,947; Referee: Tori Penso (United States)

===== Knockout stage =====
5 August 2023 R16	Switzerland	1–5	Spain	Auckland, New Zealand
	Codina 11' (o.g.)	Report	Bonmatí 5', 36'; Redondo 17'; Codina 45'; Hermoso 70'	Stadium: Eden Park; Attendance: 43,217; Referee: Cheryl Foster (Wales)

==== UEFA Women's Nations League ====
===== 2023–24 UEFA Women's Nations League A Group A4 =====
Pos	Team	Pld	W	D	L	GF	GA	GD	Pts	Qualification or relegation	(Spain)	(Italy)	(Sweden)	(Switzerland)
1	Spain	6	5	0	1	23	9	+14	15	Qualification for Nations League Finals	—	2–3	5–3	5–0
2	Italy	6	3	1	2	8	5	+3	10		0–1	—	0–1	3–0
3	Sweden (O)	6	2	1	3	8	10	−2	7	Qualification for relegation play-offs	2–3	1–1	—	1–0
4	Switzerland (R)	6	1	0	5	2	17	−15	3	Relegation to League B	1–7	0–1	1–0	—

Source: UEFA
Rules for classification: Tiebreakers
(O) Play-off winners; (R) Relegated

22 September 2023	Switzerland	0–1	Italy	St. Gallen
		Report	Caruso 64'	Stadium: Kybunpark; Referee: Lina Lehtovaara (Finland)

26 September 2023	Spain	5–0	Switzerland	Córdoba, Spain
	García 15'; Bonmatí 45+1', 49'; Gabarro 57'; Oroz 87'	Report		Stadium: Estadio Nuevo Arcángel; Referee: Monika Mularczyk (Poland)

27 October 2023	Sweden	1–0	Switzerland	Gothenburg, Sweden
18:30 UTC+2	Eriksson 44'	Report		Stadium: Gamla Ullevi; Referee: Riem Hussein (Germany)

31 October 2023	Switzerland	1–7	Spain	Zürich
19:00	Pilgrim 69'	Report	Hernández 4'; Putellas 11', 62' (pen.); Méndez 56'; Del Castillo 72', 89'; Oroz 90+3'	Stadium: Letzigrund; Referee: Iuliana Demetrescu (Romania)

1 December 2023	Switzerland	1–0	Sweden	Lucerne
--:-- UTC+1		Report		Stadium: Swissporarena

5 December 2023	Italy	3–0	Switzerland	Parma
		Report		Stadium: Stadio Ennio Tardini

==== UEFA Women's Euro 2025 qualifying League B ====
Pos	Team	Pld	W	D	L	GF	GA	GD	Pts	Qualification	(Switzerland)	(Turkey)	(Hungary)	(Azerbaijan)
1	Switzerland (H, P)	6	5	0	1	14	3	+11	15	Qualify for final tournament as host and promotion to League A	—	3–1	2–1	3–0
2	Turkey	6	3	0	3	8	8	0	9	Advance to play-offs	0–2	—	2–1	1–0
3	Hungary	6	2	1	3	10	9	+1	7	Advance to play-offs	1–0	1–4	—	1–1
4	Azerbaijan (R)	6	1	1	4	2	14	−12	4	Relegation to League C and advance to play-offs (Note: Since Switzerland (who qualified as hosts) finished in the top three places in their group, the best-ranked fourth-placed team qualified for the play-offs.)	0–4	1–0	0–5	—

Source: UEFA
Rules for classification: Tiebreakers
(H) Hosts of final tournament; (P) Promoted; (R) Relegated
Notes:

5 April	Switzerland	3–1	Turkey	Zürich
	Calligaris 30', 78'; Bühler 52'	Report	Türkoğlu 80'	Stadium: Letzigrund; Referee: Sandra Braz (Portugal)

9 April	Azerbaijan	0–4	Switzerland	Baku
		Report		Stadium: Dalga Arena; Referee: Alina Peşu (Romania)

== Club Football ==
=== Men ===
==== Swiss Cup ====
Servette FC won their first Swiss Cup in over 20 years. They beat FC Lugano on penalties, after the game ended in a goalless draw after extra time.

2 June 2024
14:00 CEST (UTC+1)

Servette FC	0–0 (a.e.t.)	FC Lugano
	Report
Penalties
Stevanović (penalty scored); Severin (penalty scored); Nishimura (penalty scored); Rouiller (penalty scored); Bolla (penalty missed); Tsunemoto (penalty missed); Douline (penalty scored); Mazikou (penalty scored); Ondoua (penalty scored); Magnin (penalty missed); Mall (penalty scored); Severin (penalty scored)	9–8	(penalty scored) Mai; (penalty scored) Grgić; (penalty scored) Aliseda; (penalty scored) Mahou; (penalty missed) Sabbatini; (penalty missed) Steffen; (penalty scored) Valenzuela; (penalty scored) Doumbia; (penalty scored) Cimignani; (penalty missed) Hajdari; (penalty scored) Saipi; (penalty missed) Mai

Stadion Wankdorf, Bern
Attendance: 27,710
Referee: Alessandro Dudic

==== Credit Suisse Super League ====
BSC Young Boys successfully defended their title, securing their 17th Swiss championship title on 20 May 2024, one round before the end of the season.

On the other end of the table, FC Stade Lausanne Ouchy end their historic first season in the Swiss top flight in last place and are thus relegated back to the Challenge League.

Pos	Team	Pld	W	D	L	GF	GA	GD	Pts	Qualification or relegation (Note: Teams played each other three times (33 matches), before the league was split into two groups (the top six and the bottom six).)
1	Young Boys (C)	38	23	8	7	76	34	+42	77	Qualification for the Champions League play-off round
2	Lugano	38	20	5	13	67	51	+16	65	Qualification for the Champions League second qualifying round
3	Servette	38	18	10	10	59	43	+16	64	Qualification for the Europa League third qualifying round (Note: Servette qualified for the Europa League third qualifying round as the 2023–24 Swiss Cup winners.)
4	Zürich	38	16	12	10	53	41	+12	60	Qualification for the Conference League second qualifying round
5	St. Gallen	38	16	9	13	60	51	+9	57	Qualification for the Conference League second qualifying round
6	Winterthur	38	13	10	15	60	71	−11	49	
7	Luzern	38	13	10	15	47	53	−6	49	
8	Basel	38	13	10	15	45	52	−7	49	
9	Yverdon-Sport	38	13	8	17	50	71	−21	47	
10	Lausanne-Sport	38	11	12	15	48	53	−5	45	
11	Grasshopper (O)	38	10	8	20	41	49	−8	38	Qualification for the Relegation play-off
12	Lausanne Ouchy (R)	38	7	8	23	40	77	−37	29	Relegation to Swiss Challenge League

Source: Swiss Super League
Rules for classification: 1) Points; 2) Goal difference; 3) Goals scored; 4) Head-to-head goal difference; 5) Head-to-head goals scored 6) Away goals scored; 7) Draw.
(C) Champions; (O) Play-off winners; (R) Relegated

==== dieci Challenge League ====
FC Sion were crowned champions of the Challenge League on 23 May 2024 the last matchday. Thus, they return to the top flight only one season after being relegated.

At the bottom of the table, FC Baden also departs the Challenge League after just one season. Their relegation was definite on 3 May 2024, three rounds before the end of the season.

Pos	Team	Pld	W	D	L	GF	GA	GD	Pts	Promotion, qualification or relegation
1	Sion (C, P)	36	23	10	3	72	23	+49	79	Promotion to Swiss Super League
2	Thun	36	23	7	6	73	38	+35	76	Qualification for promotion play-off
3	Vaduz	36	13	10	13	67	55	+12	49	Qualification for Conference League second qualifying round (Note: Vaduz qualified for the Conference League second qualifying round by winning the 2023–24 Liechtenstein Cup.)
4	Xamax	36	11	16	9	55	45	+10	49	
5	Wil	36	11	11	14	48	52	−4	44	
6	Aarau	36	12	7	17	53	59	−6	43	
7	Nyon	36	11	10	15	45	58	−13	43	
8	Bellinzona	36	11	9	16	37	50	−13	42	
9	Schaffhausen	36	8	14	14	36	55	−19	38	
10	Baden (R)	36	6	8	22	31	82	−51	26	Relegation to Swiss Promotion League

Source: Swiss Challenge League
Rules for classification: 1) Points; 2) Goal difference; 3) Goals scored; 4) Head-to-head goal difference; 5) Head-to-head goals scored 6) Away goals scored; 7) Draw.
(C) Champions; (P) Promoted; (R) Relegated

==== Hoval Promotion League ====
Étoile Carouge FC were crowned champions of the Promotion League on 11 May 2024 and thus are promoted to the Challenge League for the first time in twelve years.

Pos	Team	Pld	W	D	L	GF	GA	GD	Pts	Promotion, qualification or relegation
1	Étoile Carouge FC (C, P)	34	24	4	6	72	38	+34	76	Promotion to Swiss Challenge League and qualification for Swiss Cup
2	FC Rapperswil-Jona	34	22	5	7	74	44	+30	71	Qualification for Swiss Cup
3	FC Biel-Bienne	34	18	5	11	61	35	+26	59	Qualification for Swiss Cup
4	FC Paradiso	34	16	8	10	38	32	+6	56	Qualification for Swiss Cup
5	SR Delémont	34	16	5	13	56	62	−6	53	Qualification for Swiss Cup
6	SC Kriens	34	13	10	11	50	58	−8	49	Qualification for Swiss Cup
7	SC Brühl	34	15	5	14	53	60	−7	50	Qualification for Swiss Cup
8	SC Cham	34	12	8	14	69	62	+7	44	
9	FC Zürich II	34	13	6	15	58	56	+2	45	
10	FC Bavois	34	12	7	15	66	58	+8	43	
11	FC Breitenrain	34	10	9	15	48	61	−13	39	
12	BSC Young Boys II	34	12	8	14	51	63	−12	44	
13	FC Luzern II	34	11	10	13	61	68	−7	43	
14	FC Bulle	34	10	9	15	47	58	−11	39	
15	FC Basel II	34	10	8	16	54	63	−9	38	
16	FC Lugano II	34	12	4	18	51	65	−14	40	
17	FC St. Gallen II (R)	34	10	7	17	56	61	−5	37	Relegation to the 1. Liga Classic
18	Servette FC II (R)	34	6	10	18	47	68	−21	28	Relegation to the 1. Liga Classic

Source: Erste Liga - Match center
Rules for classification: 1) Points; 2) Goal difference; 3) Goals scored; 4) Head-to-head goal difference; 5) Away goals scored; 6) Draw.
(C) Champions; (P) Promoted; (R) Relegated

==== Relegation/Promotion play-off ====
Grasshopper Club Zürich were able to secure their spot in the Super League against challengers FC Thun in the relegation/promotion play-offs on 31 May 2024. In both legs, they were able to score in overtime. Grasshoppers thus win their first ever relegation play-off, while Thun is still winless after their third participation.

26 May 2024	Grasshopper	1–1	Thun	Letzigrund, Zürich
16:30 CEST (UTC+2)	Morandi 90+7' (pen.)	Report	52' Gutbub	Attendance: 9,045; Referee: Sandro Schärer; Assistant referees: Fedayi San (VAR)

31 May 2024	Thun	1–2	Grasshopper	Stockhorn Arena, Thun
20:30 CEST (UTC+2)	Koné 43' (pen.) (red card) 90+4'	Report	3' Morandi; 90+1' Abubakar	Attendance: 10,014; Referee: Urs Schnyder; Assistant referees: Lionel Tschudi (VAR)

Grasshopper wins 3–2 on aggregate. Both teams remain in their respective leagues.

== Swiss Clubs in Europe ==
=== UEFA Champions League ===
==== Qualifying phase and play-off round ====
===== Second qualifying round =====
Team 1	Agg.	Team 2	1st leg	2nd leg
Servette (Switzerland)	3–3 (4–1 p)	(Belgium) Genk	1–1	2–2 (a.e.t.)

===== Third qualifying round =====
Team 1	Agg.	Team 2	1st leg	2nd leg
Rangers (Scotland)	3–2	(Switzerland) Servette	2–1	1–1

===== Play-off round =====
Team 1	Agg.	Team 2	1st leg	2nd leg
Maccabi Haifa (Israel)	0–3	(Switzerland) Young Boys	0–0	0–3

==== Group stage ====
===== Group G =====
Pos	Team	Pld	W	D	L	GF	GA	GD	Pts	Qualification	MCI	RBL	YB	RSB
1	(England) Manchester City	6	6	0	0	18	7	+11	18	Advance to knockout phase	—	3–2	3–0	3–1
2	(Germany) RB Leipzig	6	4	0	2	13	10	+3	12	Advance to knockout phase	1–3	—	2–1	3–1
3	(Switzerland) Young Boys	6	1	1	4	7	13	−6	4	Transfer to Europa League	1–3	1–3	—	2–0
4	(Serbia) Red Star Belgrade	6	0	1	5	7	15	−8	1		2–3	1–2	2–2	—

Source: UEFA

=== UEFA Europa League ===
==== Qualifying phase and play-off round ====
===== Play-off round =====
Team 1	Agg.	Team 2	1st leg	2nd leg
Union Saint-Gilloise (Belgium)	3–0	(Switzerland) Lugano	2–0	1–0

==== Group stage ====
===== Group G =====
Pos	Team	Pld	W	D	L	GF	GA	GD	Pts	Qualification	SLP	ROM	SRV	SHE
1	(Czech Republic) Slavia Prague	6	5	0	1	17	4	+13	15	Advance to round of 16	—	2–0	4–0	6–0
2	(Italy) Roma	6	4	1	1	12	4	+8	13	Advance to knockout round play-offs	2–0	—	4–0	3–0
3	(Switzerland) Servette	6	1	2	3	4	13	−9	5	Transfer to Europa Conference League	0–2	1–1	—	2–1
4	(Moldova) Sheriff Tiraspol	6	0	1	5	5	17	−12	1		2–3	1–2	1–1	—

Source: UEFA

==== Knockout stage ====
===== Knockout-round play-offs =====
Team 1	Agg.	Team 2	1st leg	2nd leg
Young Boys (Switzerland)	2–4	(Portugal) Sporting CP	1–3	1–1

=== UEFA Europa Conference League ===
==== Qualifying phase and play-off round ====
===== Second qualifying round =====
Team 1	Agg.	Team 2	1st leg	2nd leg
Djurgårdens IF (Sweden)	2–3	(Switzerland) Luzern	1–2	1–1
Basel (Switzerland)	3–4	(Kazakhstan) Tobol	1–3	2–1

===== Third qualifying round =====
Team 1	Agg.	Team 2	1st leg	2nd leg
Hibernian (Scotland)	5–3	(Switzerland) Luzern	3–1	2–2

==== Group stage ====
===== Group D =====
Pos	Team	Pld	W	D	L	GF	GA	GD	Pts	Qualification	BRU	BOD	BEŞ	LUG
1	(Belgium) Club Brugge	6	5	1	0	15	3	+12	16	Advance to round of 16	—	3–1	1–1	2–0
2	(Norway) Bodø/Glimt	6	3	1	2	11	8	+3	10	Advance to knockout round play-offs	0–1	—	3–1	5–2
3	(Turkey) Beşiktaş	6	1	1	4	7	14	−7	4 (Note: Ranked on head-to-head goal difference: Beşiktaş +1, Lugano –1.)		0–5	1–2	—	2–3
4	(Switzerland) Lugano	6	1	1	4	6	14	−8	4		1–3	0–0	0–2	—

Source: UEFA

==== Knockout phase ====
===== Knockout round play-offs =====
Team 1	Agg.	Team 2	1st leg	2nd leg
Servette (Switzerland)	1–0	(Bulgaria) Ludogorets Razgrad	0–0	1–0

===== Round of 16 =====
Team 1	Agg.	Team 2	1st leg	2nd leg
Servette (Switzerland)	0–0 (1–3 p)	(Czech Republic) Viktoria Plzeň	0–0	0–0 (a.e.t.)

=== UEFA Women's Champions League ===
==== Qualifying round ====
===== Round 1 =====
====== Final ======
Team 1	Score	Team 2
Zürich (Switzerland)	3–1	(Malta) Birkirkara

===== Round 2 =====
Team 1	Agg.	Team 2	1st leg	2nd leg
Zürich (Switzerland)	0–8	(Netherlands) Ajax	0–6	0–2

=== UEFA Youth League ===
==== UEFA Champions League Path ====
===== Group stage =====
====== Group G ======
Pos	Team	Pld	W	D	L	GF	GA	GD	Pts	Qualification	MCI	RBL	RSB	YB
1	(The Football Association) Manchester City	6	4	2	0	17	6	+11	14	Advance to round of 16	—	2–1	5–2	3–0
2	(German Football Association) RB Leipzig	6	3	2	1	8	5	+3	11	Advance to play-offs	1–1	—	2–1	0–0
3	(Football Association of Serbia) Red Star Belgrade	6	1	1	4	8	13	−5	4 (Note: Tied on head-to head record.)		2–2	0–1	—	2–1
4	(Swiss Football Association) Young Boys	6	1	1	4	4	13	−9	4		0–4	1–3	2–1	—

Source: UEFA

==== Domestic Champions Path ====
===== First Round =====
Team 1	Agg.	Team 2	1st leg	2nd leg
Gent (Belgium)	0–3	(Switzerland) Basel	0–1	0–2

===== Second Round =====
Team 1	Agg.	Team 2	1st leg	2nd leg
Basel (Switzerland)	2–0	(Croatia) Dinamo Zagreb	2–0	0–0

==== Knockout phase ====
===== Play-offs =====
Team 1	Score	Team 2
Basel (Switzerland)	0–2	(Germany) Bayern Munich

Preceded by 2022–23	Seasons in Swiss football	Succeeded by 2024–25
