= Tanoulis =

Tanoulis is a surname. Notable people with the surname include:

- Georgios Tanoulis (born 2002), Greek basketball player
- Konstantinos Tanoulis (born 2005), Greek footballer
