= Cristian David =

Cristian David may refer to:

- Cristian David (politician) (born 1967), Romanian politician
- Cristian David (footballer) (born 2005), Spanish footballer

== See also ==
- Christian David (1692–1751), German Lutheran missionary, writer and hymnwriter
