= Luís Gomes (footballer) =

Portuguese footballer

Personal information
- Full name: Luís Domingos Vieira Barata Gomes
- Date of birth: 13 April 2005 (age 21)
- Place of birth: Vila Real, Portugal
- Height: 1.90 m (6 ft 3 in)
- Position: Centre back

Team information
- Current team: Porto B
- Number: 64

Youth career
- 2011–2015: Vila Real
- 2015–2024: Porto

Senior career*
Years	Team	Apps	(Gls)
2024–	Porto B	28	(1)

International career^{‡}
2021–2022	Portugal U17	5	(0)
2022–2023	Portugal U18	7	(0)
2023–2024	Portugal U19	11	(0)
2024–	Portugal U20	6	(0)
Medal record
Men's football
Representing Portugal
UEFA European Under-19 Championship
Runner-up	2023 Malta
- * Club domestic league appearances and goals as of 19 June 2026 ‡ National team caps and goals as of 16:26, 20 December 2025 (UTC)

Luís Domingos Vieira Barata Gomes (born 13 April 2005) is a Portuguese footballer who plays as a centre back for Porto B.

== Club career ==
Born in Vila Real, Gomes began playing for local S.C. Vila Real before joining the youth ranks of Porto in 2015. In July 2021, after a season playing for the under-17 team, he signed his first professional contract.

On 15 September 2024, Gomes made his senior debut for Porto B in a 1–1 Liga Portugal 2 draw away to Penafiel, playing the full match and receiving a yellow card at the end. He scored his first goal on 21 December, heading an equaliser in a 2–1 loss away to Vizela.

On 3 April 2025, Gomes signed a new contract until 2030. He was sent off on 14 September in a 2–1 home loss to União de Leiria, eight minutes after coming on as a substitute for Domingos Andrade. The following month, he was one of 12 B-team or youth players called up by first-team manager Francesco Farioli to train ahead of a Taça de Portugal match with C.D. Celoricense, due to 13 senior players being on international duty.

== International career ==
Gomes was chosen for the Portugal under-17 team at the 2022 UEFA European Under-17 Championship in Israel. He played only in the final group game, a 3–1 defeat to Denmark in which he scored an own goal but his team advanced. He was an added-time substitute for Porto teammate António Ribeiro in the under-19 team's 1–0 loss to Italy in the final of the 2023 UEFA European Under-19 Championship in Malta.

== Personal life ==
Gomes's younger brother Salvador, another centre-back, also signed for Porto's youth teams.
