= 2026–27 NEC Nijmegen season =

NEC Nijmegen
2026–27 season
- Chairman: Ron van Oijen
- Head coach: Dick Schreuder
- Stadium: Goffertstadion
- Eredivisie: 10th
- KNVB Cup: Second round
- UEFA Champions League: Play-off round
- UEFA Europa League: League phase
- Top goalscorer: League: Kaj Sierhuis (2); All: Bryan Linssen; Kaj Sierhuis (2 each)
Home colours	Away colours	Third colours
- All statistics correct as of 15 August 2026.

The 2026–27 season is the 117th season in the history of NEC Nijmegen, and the club's sixth consecutive season in the Eredivisie. In addition to the domestic league, the club is also competing in the KNVB Cup, the UEFA Champions League (making a debut appearance), and the UEFA Europa League.

== Transfers ==
=== In ===
Pos.	Player	Transferred from	Fee	Date	Source
DF	(Netherlands) Perr Schuurs	(Italy) Torino	Free	16 June 2026	
FW	(Netherlands) Kaj Sierhuis	(Netherlands) Fortuna Sittard	Free	1 July 2026	
DF	(Denmark) Tobias Storm	(Denmark) Lyngby	Undisclosed	1 July 2026	
MF	(Morocco) Adam Tahaui	(Netherlands) Vitesse	Undisclosed	7 July 2026	
MF	(Cape Verde) Jamiro Monteiro	(Netherlands) PEC Zwolle	Free	13 July 2026	
MF	(Turkey) Emre Mor	(Turkey) Fenerbahçe	Free	20 July 2026	
FW	(Denmark) Clement Bischoff	(Austria) Red Bull Salzburg	Loan	22 July 2026	
FW	(Serbia) Dušan Tadić	Unattached	Free	27 July 2026	
GK	(Austria) Nikolas Polster	(Austria) Wolfsberger AC	€2,000,000	12 August 2026	
DF	(Portugal) Gabriel Brás	(Portugal) FC Porto B	Loan	13 August 2026	
DF	(Germany) Almugera Kabar	(Germany) Borussia Dortmund	Loan	14 August 2026	
MF	(Germany) Dennis Geiger	(Germany) Hoffenheim	Free	28 August 2026	

=== Out ===
Pos.	Player	Transferred to	Fee	Date	Source
DF	(Turkey) Ahmetcan Kaplan	(Netherlands) Ajax	Loan return	30 June 2026	
GK	(Netherlands) Jasper Cillessen		End of contract	1 July 2026	
FW	(Morocco) Youssef El Kachati	(France) Reims	Undisclosed	1 July 2026	
DF	(Netherlands) Jetro Willems		End of contract	1 July 2026	

== Pre-season ==
1 July 2026 Friendly	De Treffers (Netherlands)	1–1	(Netherlands) NEC
19:00	Brussaard 21'		Lebreton 82'

8 July 2026 Friendly	NEC (Netherlands)	2–3	(Germany) MSV Duisburg
14:00	Ouwejan 49'; Kers 71'		Krüger 15'; Remmert 29'; Sussek 58'

11 July 2026 Friendly	Anderlecht (Belgium)	3–2	(Netherlands) NEC
10:45

14 July 2026 Friendly	NEC (Netherlands)	3–1	(Japan) V-Varen Nagasaki
19:00

18 July 2026 Friendly	NEC (Netherlands)	7–0	(Saudi Arabia) Al-Fayha
14:00

25 July 2026 Friendly	NEC (Netherlands)	0–1	(Germany) SV Elversberg
14:00

31 July 2026 Friendly	NEC (Netherlands)	1–2	(Spain) Sevilla
19:00

== Competitions ==
=== Overall record ===
Competition	First match	Last match	Starting round	Record							
Competition	First match	Last match	Starting round	Pld	W	D	L	GF	GA	GD	Win %
Eredivisie	8 August 2026		Matchday 1	6	2	1	3	11	12	−1	33.33
KNVB Cup				0	0	0	0	0	0	+0	—
UEFA Champions League	4 August 2026		Third qualifying round	2	1	1	0	2	1	+1	50.00
Total				8	3	2	3	13	13	+0	37.50

Last updated: 13 September 2026
Source: Competitions

=== Eredivisie ===
Pos	Team	Pld	W	D	L	GF	GA	GD	Pts
9	Groningen	12	4	3	5	29	28	+1	15
10	Cambuur	12	4	3	5	25	27	−2	15
11	NEC	12	3	5	4	20	21	−1	14
12	Sparta Rotterdam	12	3	3	6	21	29	−8	12
13	PEC Zwolle	12	3	3	6	13	24	−11	12

Updated to match(es) played on 8 November 2026. Source: Eredivisie
Rules for classification: 1) Points; 2) Less loss points; 3) Goal difference; 4) Goals scored; 5) Head-to-head points; 6) Head-to-head goal difference; 7) Head-to-head away goals scored; 9) Play-off if relevant for deciding champion, relegation or participating in a European league, otherwise by draw. 9) Penalty shoot-out (only after a play-off)

==== Results summary ====
Overall								Home						Away					
Pld	W	D	L	GF	GA	GD	Pts	W	D	L	GF	GA	GD	W	D	L	GF	GA	GD
8	2	3	3	13	14	−1	9	0	2	2	5	8	−3	2	1	1	8	6	+2

Last updated: 10 October 2026.
Source: Eredivisie

==== Results by round ====
Round	1	2	3	4	5
Ground	H	A	A	H	H
Result	L	W	W	L	D
Position	11	10			

Updated to match(es) played on 8 September 2026. Source: Eredivisie
A = Away; H = Home; W = Win; D = Draw; L = Loss

==== Matches ====
8 August 2026 1	NEC	1–2	Telstar	Nijmegen
16:30	Pereira (yellow card) 57'; Hansen-Aarøen (yellow card) 68'; Sierhuis 82'	Report	Brouwer 1'; Mendes 24'; Ahmed (yellow card) 74'; Koeman Jr. (yellow card) 78'	Stadium: Goffertstadion; Referee: Martijn Vos

15 August 2026 2	Willem II	1–4	NEC	Tilburg
16:30	Tjoe-A-On (yellow card) 16'; Verheydt 77'	Report	Tahaui 45+3'; Chery 54'; Linssen 64'; Sierhuis 67'	Stadium: Koning Willem II Stadion; Referee: Serdar Gözübüyük

29 August 2026 3	PEC Zwolle	1–3	NEC	Zwolle
21:00	Kostons 45+1' (pen.), (penalty missed) 72'; Aertssen (yellow card) 90+3'	Report	Chery 5' (pen.), 23' (pen.); Kabar (yellow card) 63'; Tadić (yellow card) 70'; Storm (yellow card) 73'; Schuurs 83'	Stadium: MAC³PARK Stadion; Referee: Joey Kooij

5 September 2026 4	NEC	1–3	Feyernoord	Nijmegen
16:45 CEST (UTC+2)	Lebreton (yellow card) 45+3'; Nejašmić 55'	Report	Zechiël (yellow card) 45+3', (goal) 52'; Targhalline (yellow card) 50'; Valente 61'; Schaken 64'	Stadium: Goffertstadion; Referee: Allard Lindhout

8 September 2026 5	NEC	2–2	Excelsior	Nijmegen
18:45 CEST (UTC+2)	Jamiro (yellow card) 4'; Tahaui 10'; Lebreton 90+2'		Garden 43'; Hartjes (yellow card) 52'; Sulzbacher 73', (yellow card) 90+5'	Stadium: Goffertstadion; Referee: Erwin Blank

12 September 2026 6	Cambuur	3–0	NEC	Leeuwarden
21:00 CEST (UTC+2)	Hamache 21', 54'; Bouah (yellow card) 32'; Henstra 90+2', (yellow card) 90+6'	Report	Storm (yellow card) 35'; Sandler (yellow card) 38'; Lebreton (yellow card) 87'; Kabar (yellow card) 90+6'	Stadium: Kooi Stadion; Referee: Ingmar Oostrom

20 September 2026 7	NEC	1–1	Go Ahead Eagles	Nijmegen
16:45 CEST (UTC+2)	Schuurs 2'	Report	Sigurðarson 10'; Tengstedt (yellow card) 31'; Baeten (yellow card) 77'	Stadium: Goffertstadion; Attendance: 12,650; Referee: Martijn Vos

10 October 2026 8	Ajax	1–1	NEC	Amsterdam
21:00 CEST (UTC+2)	Arokodare 7'; Ouazane (yellow card) 67'	Report	Chery 19' (pen.); Linssen (yellow card) 33'; Brás (yellow card) 54'	Stadium: Johan Cruyff Arena; Referee: Serdar Gözübüyük

=== UEFA Champions League ===
==== Third qualifying round ====
4 August 2026 First leg	Olympiacos (Greece)	0–0	(Netherlands) NEC	Piraeus, Greece
21:00 UTC+3		Report		Stadium: Karaiskakis Stadium; Attendance: 31,134; Referee: José María Sánchez Martínez (Spain)

11 August 2026 Second leg	NEC (Netherlands)	2–1 (a.e.t.) (2–1 agg.)	(Greece) Olympiacos	Nijmegen
19:30	Linssen 70'; Pereira (yellow card) 88'; Sierhuis (yellow card) 90+4'; Mor 95'	Report	García (yellow card) 12'; El Kaabi 46'; Rodinei (yellow card) 55'; Sá (yellow card) 59'; Fortounis (red card) 80'; Scipioni (yellow card) 111'	Stadium: Goffertstadion; Attendance: 11,700; Referee: Maurizio Mariani (Italy)

==== Play-off round ====
19 August 2026 First leg	NEC (Netherlands)	1–3	(Norway) Bodø/Glimt	Nijmegen
21:00	Bischoff 85'	Report	Fet 25'; Helmersen 44' (pen.); Aleesami 50'	Stadium: Goffertstadion; Referee: François Letexier (France)

25 August 2026 Second leg	Bodø/Glimt (Norway)	3–0 (1–6 agg.)	(Netherlands) NEC	Bodø, Norway
21:00	Bjørkan 45+2'; Auklend 45+3'; Fonville 73' (o.g.)	Report		Stadium: Aspmyra Stadion; Referee: Michael Oliver (England)

=== UEFA Europa League ===
==== League phase ====
Pos	Team	Pld	W	D	L	GF	GA	GD	Pts	Qualification
10	(Bulgaria) Levski Sofia	4	2	1	1	4	3	+1	7	Advance to knockout phase play-offs (seeded)
11	(England) Sunderland	4	2	1	1	4	4	0	7	Advance to knockout phase play-offs (seeded)
12	(Netherlands) NEC	4	2	1	1	8	9	−1	7	Advance to knockout phase play-offs (seeded)
13	(France) Lyon	4	2	1	1	6	7	−1	7	Advance to knockout phase play-offs (seeded)
14	(Netherlands) AZ	4	2	0	2	7	4	+3	6	Advance to knockout phase play-offs (seeded)

Updated to match(es) played on 5 November 2026. Source: UEFA
Rules for classification: League phase tiebreakers

Round	1	2	3	4	5	6	7	8
Ground	A	H	A	H	H	A	H	A
Result	L	D	W	W				
Position	36	27						

Updated to match(es) played on 5 November 2026. Source: UEFA
A = Away; H = Home; W = Win; D = Draw; L = Loss

17 September 2026 1	Juventus (Italy)	5–0	(Netherlands) NEC	Turin, Italy
21:00	González 9'; Alajbegović 24'; Woltemade 35' (pen.); Douglas Luiz (yellow card) 53'; Çelik 75'; Kolo Muani 82'	Report	Monteiro (yellow card) 52'	Stadium: Juventus Stadium; Attendance: 41,407; Referee: Oleksiy Derevinskyi (Ukraine)

15 October 2026 2	NEC (Netherlands)	1–1	(Bulgaria) Levski Sofia	Nijmegen
21:00	Lebreton (yellow card) 24'; Chery 64'	Report	Reinaldo 35'	Stadium: Goffertstadion; Attendance: 11,700; Referee: Aliyar Aghayev (Azerbaijan)

22 October 2026 3	Dinamo Zagreb (Croatia)	2–4	(Netherlands) NEC	Zagreb, Croatia
18:45	Beljo (yellow card) 23', (goal) 33', 37'	Report	Bischoff 25', (yellow card) 90+2'; Lebreton (yellow card) 44'; Linssen 45', 54'; Chery 80'	Stadium: Stadion Maksimir; Referee: Manfredas Lukjančukas (Lithuania)

5 November 2026 4	NEC (Netherlands)	3–1	(Cyprus) Omonia	Nijmegen
18:45	Bischoff (yellow card) 32', (goal) 74'; Linssen 50', 76'	Report	Diony 23'	Stadium: Goffertstadion; Referee: Goga Kikacheishvili (Georgia)

26 November 2026 5	NEC (Netherlands)	v	(France) Rennes	Nijmegen
21:00		Report		Stadium: Goffertstadion

10 December 2026 6	Ararat-Armenia	v	(Netherlands) NEC	Yerevan, Armenia
18:45		Report		Stadium: Vazgen Sargsyan Republican Stadium

21 January 2027 7	NEC (Netherlands)	v	(Portugal) Benfica	Nijmegen
18:45		Report		Stadium: Goffertstadion

28 January 2027 8	Celje (Slovenia)	v	(Netherlands) NEC	Celje, Slovenia
21:00		Report		Stadium: Stadion Z'dežele
