= 2023–24 UEFA Youth League Domestic Champions Path =

Part of football competition

The 2023–24 UEFA Youth League Domestic Champions Path began on 3 October 2023 and ended on 3 December 2023. A total of 32 teams competed in the Domestic Champions Path to decide eight of the 24 places in the knockout phase (play-offs and the round of 16 onwards) of the 2023–24 UEFA Youth League.

Times listed here by CEST/CET. (Note: Times up to 29 October 2023 (first round) are CEST (UTC+2), thereafter (second round) times are CET (UTC+1).)

== Draw ==
The youth domestic champions of the top 32 associations according to their 2023 UEFA country coefficients entered the Domestic Champions Path. If there was a vacancy (associations with no youth domestic competition, as well as youth domestic champions already included in the UEFA Champions League path), it was first filled by the title holders if they have not yet qualified, and then by the youth domestic champions of the next association in the UEFA ranking.

For the Domestic Champions Path, the 32 teams were drawn into two rounds of two-legged home-and-away ties. The draw for both the first round and second round was held on 5 September 2023, at the UEFA headquarters in Nyon, Switzerland. There were no seedings, but the 32 teams were split into groups defined by sporting and geographical criteria prior to the draw.

- In the first round, the 32 teams were split into four groups. Teams in the same group were drawn against each other, with the order of legs decided by draw.
- In the second round, the 16 winners of the first round, whose identity was not known at the time of the draw, were split into two groups: Group A contained the winners from Groups 1 and 2, while Group B contained the winners from Groups 3 and 4. Teams in the same group were drawn against each other, with the order of legs decided by draw.

Key to colours
Second round winners advanced to the play-offs

Group 1 Team (France) Nantes (Ukraine) Rukh Lviv (Czech Republic) Sparta Prague (Cyprus) Pafos (Israel) Maccabi Haifa (Poland) Lech Poznań (Slovakia) Žilina (Bosnia and Herzegovina) Sarajevo	Group 2 Team (Portugal) Famalicão (Netherlands) AZ (Scotland) Hamilton Academical (Norway) Molde (Denmark) Midtjylland (Sweden) Malmö FF (Lithuania) Klaipėda (Finland) HJK	Group 3 Team (Italy) Lecce (Serbia) Partizan (Greece) Olympiacos (Bulgaria) Ludogorets Razgrad (Romania) Universitatea Craiova (Kazakhstan) Turan (Belarus) Dinamo Minsk (Moldova) Sheriff Tiraspol	Group 4 Team (Germany) Mainz 05 (Belgium) Gent (Switzerland) Basel (Croatia) Dinamo Zagreb (Turkey) İstanbul Başakşehir (Azerbaijan) Gabala (Hungary) Puskás Akadémia (Slovenia) Maribor

== Format ==
In the Domestic Champions Path, each tie was played over two legs, with each team playing one leg at home. The team that scored more goals on aggregate over the two legs advanced to the next round. If the aggregate score was level, as the away goals rule had been scrapped, the match would be decided by a penalty shoot-out with no extra time played.

The eight second round winners advanced to the play-offs, where they were joined by the eight group runners-up from the UEFA Champions League Path.

== First round ==
=== Summary ===
The first legs were played on 3 and 4 October and the second legs were played on 8, 24, and 25 October 2023.

Team 1	Agg.	Team 2	1st leg	2nd leg
Lech Poznań (Poland)	1–1 (2–4 p)	(France) Nantes	1–1	0–0
Pafos (Cyprus)	0–6	(Slovakia) Žilina	0–1	0–5
Rukh Lviv (Ukraine)	4–2	(Bosnia and Herzegovina) Sarajevo	1–1	3–1
Sparta Prague (Czech Republic)	w/o (Note: Due to the Gaza war, the second leg was cancelled after Maccabi Haifa withdrew from the competition, and Sparta Prague advanced on a walkover.)	(Israel) Maccabi Haifa	1–1	Canc.
AZ (Netherlands)	14–0	(Lithuania) Klaipėda	12–0	2–0
Malmö FF (Sweden)	3–5	(Finland) HJK	1–4	2–1
Molde (Norway)	5–4	(Scotland) Hamilton Academical	3–0	2–4
Famalicão (Portugal)	2–2 (6–7 p)	(Denmark) Midtjylland	2–2	0–0
Turan (Kazakhstan)	0–6	(Moldova) Sheriff Tiraspol	0–1	0–5
Universitatea Craiova (Romania)	0–5	(Serbia) Partizan	0–1	0–4
Olympiacos (Greece)	6–2	(Italy) Lecce	3–1	3–1
Dinamo Minsk (Belarus)	2–1	(Bulgaria) Ludogorets Razgrad	0–1	2–0
Maribor (Slovenia)	1–3	(Germany) Mainz 05	0–2	1–1
Gent (Belgium)	0–3	(Switzerland) Basel	0–1	0–2
Dinamo Zagreb (Croatia)	5–2	(Turkey) İstanbul Başakşehir	2–1	3–1
Gabala (Azerbaijan)	2–1	(Hungary) Puskás Akadémia	1–1	1–0

=== Matches ===
4 October 2023
14:00

Lech Poznań (Poland)	1–1	(France) Nantes
Pacławski 35'	Report	Toure 68'

Stadion Amiki Wronki, Wronki
Attendance: 300
Referee: Erkan Özdamar (Turkey)
25 October 2023
17:00

Nantes (France)	0–0	(Poland) Lech Poznań
	Report
Penalties
Assoumani (penalty scored); Zézé (penalty scored); David (penalty scored); Meupiyou (penalty scored)	4–2	(penalty scored) Olejnik; (penalty scored) Gurgul; (penalty missed) Tomaszewski; (penalty missed) Juszczyk

Stade Marcel-Saupin, Nantes
Attendance: 1,800
Referee: Jamie Robinson (Northern Ireland)

1–1 on aggregate; Nantes won 4–2 on penalties.

4 October 2023
15:00 (16:00 UTC+3)

Pafos (Cyprus)	0–1	(Slovakia) Žilina
	Report	Klaučo 2'

Stelios Kyriakides Stadium, Paphos
Attendance: 350
Referee: Jan Petřík (Czech Republic)
25 October 2023
16:30

Žilina (Slovakia)	5–0	(Cyprus) Pafos
Vaľko 45' (pen.), 88'; Atanasijević 52'; Šimun 74'; Kóša 81'	Report

Štadión pod Dubňom, Žilina
Attendance: 1,642
Referee: Luka Bilbija (Bosnia and Herzegovina)

Žilina won 6–0 on aggregate.

4 October 2023
14:00

Rukh Lviv (Ukraine)	1–1	(Bosnia and Herzegovina) Sarajevo
Kitela 66' (pen.)	Report	Nurković 23'

Subcarpathian Football Center, Stalowa Wola, Poland (Note: Due to the Russian invasion of Ukraine, Ukrainian teams were required to play their home matches at neutral venues until further notice.)
Attendance: 270
Referee: Joonas Jaanovits (Estonia)
25 October 2023
18:00

Sarajevo (Bosnia and Herzegovina)	1–3	(Ukraine) Rukh Lviv
Bezdrob 4'	Report	Panchenko 24'; Kvas 65'; Pastukh 84'

Koševo City Stadium, Sarajevo
Attendance: 1,500
Referee: Marian Barbu (Romania)

Rukh Lviv won 4–2 on aggregate.

4 October 2023
15:00

Sparta Prague (Czech Republic)	1–1	(Israel) Maccabi Haifa
Lilling 90+6'	Report	Dahan 42'

Stadion Lokomotiva Praha, Prague
Attendance: 500
Referee: Martin Dohál (Slovakia)
25 October 2023
16:00 (17:00 UTC+3)

Maccabi Haifa (Israel)	Cancelled (Note: Due to the Gaza war, Maccabi Haifa withdrew from the competition.)	(Czech Republic) Sparta Prague
	Report

Sammy Ofer Stadium, Haifa

Sparta Prague won on walkover as Maccabi Haifa withdrew.

3 October 2023
17:00

AZ (Netherlands)	12–0	(Lithuania) Klaipėda
Daal 11' (pen.); Smit 22'; Schouten 36'; Hartog 37', 69', 76'; Van den Ban 40', 44'; Kwakman 42'; Smits 50', 58'; Oerip 90'	Report

AZ Training Centre, Wijdewormer
Attendance: 400
Referee: Mervan Bejtullahu (Kosovo)
25 October 2023
17:30 (18:30 UTC+3)

Klaipėda (Lithuania)	0–2	(Netherlands) AZ
	Report	Bouziane 13'; Smits 73'

Klaipėda Central Stadium, Klaipėda
Attendance: 582
Referee: Andreas Argyrou (Cyprus)

AZ won 14–0 on aggregate.

4 October 2023
18:45

Malmö FF (Sweden)	1–4	(Finland) HJK
Daly Tempelaar 90+5'	Report	Makolli 2' (o.g.); Möller 40'; Ezeh 43' (pen.); Vuorinen 47'

Eleda Stadion, Malmö
Attendance: 742
Referee: Rob Hennessy (Republic of Ireland)
25 October 2023
18:00 (19:00 UTC+3)

HJK (Finland)	1–2	(Sweden) Malmö FF
Ezeh 71'	Report	Ghita 18', 24'

Bolt Arena, Helsinki
Attendance: 362
Referee: Helgi Mikael Jónasson (Iceland)

HJK won 5–3 on aggregate.

3 October 2023
11:00

Molde (Norway)	3–0	(Scotland) Hamilton Academical
Juberg-Hovland 35'; Myklebust 62'; Ødegård 68'	Report

Aker Stadion, Molde
Attendance: 221
Referee: Marian Barbu (Romania)
24 October 2023
20:00 (19:00 UTC+1)

Hamilton Academical (Scotland)	4–2	(Norway) Molde
Black 40' (pen.), 44', 64' (pen.); Meechan 50'	Report	Nyheim 13'; Myklebust 74'

New Douglas Park, Hamilton
Attendance: 695
Referee: Ante Čulina (Croatia)

Molde won 5–4 on aggregate.

4 October 2023
16:00 (15:00 UTC+1)

Famalicão (Portugal)	2–2	(Denmark) Midtjylland
Pablo 32'; D. Oliveira 34'	Report	Hansen 72'; Lindekilde 82'

Estádio Municipal 22 de Junho, Vila Nova de Famalicão
Attendance: 2,490
Referee: Jan Machálek (Czech Republic)
25 October 2023
14:00

Midtjylland (Denmark)	0–0	(Portugal) Famalicão
	Report
Penalties
Voldby (penalty scored); Tornvig (penalty scored); Kristjánsson (penalty scored); Bjerge (penalty scored); Melin (penalty missed); Johannesen (penalty scored); Andersen (penalty scored); Jørgensen (penalty scored)	7–6	(penalty scored) H. Oliveira; (penalty missed) Yukutomo; (penalty scored) Ribeiro; (penalty scored) R. Almeida; (penalty scored) D. Oliveira; (penalty scored) H. Silva; (penalty scored) M. Almeida; (penalty missed) Costa

MCH Arena, Herning
Attendance: 718
Referee: Roman Jitari (Moldova)

2–2 on aggregate; Midtjylland won 7–6 on penalties.

4 October 2023
17:00

Turan (Kazakhstan)	0–1	(Moldova) Sheriff Tiraspol
	Report	Pleşca 76'

Namys Stadium, Şymkent
Attendance: 178
Referee: Jérémy Muller (Luxembourg)
25 October 2023
14:00 (15:00 UTC+3)

Sheriff Tiraspol (Moldova)	5–0	(Kazakhstan) Turan
Covalschi 22'; Dijinari 69'; Greşciuc 73'; Sandeţchi 75'; Hagiu 90+3' (pen.)	Report

Malaya Sportivnaya Arena, Tiraspol
Attendance: 586
Referee: Jakob A. Sundberg (Denmark)

Sheriff Tiraspol won 6–0 on aggregate.

4 October 2023
18:00 (19:00 UTC+3)

Universitatea Craiova (Romania)	0–1	(Serbia) Partizan
	Report	Jovanović 15'

Stadionul Ion Oblemenco, Craiova
Attendance: 3,800
Referee: Ion Orlic (Moldova)
25 October 2023
18:00

Partizan (Serbia)	4–0	(Romania) Universitatea Craiova
Mirčetić 8'; Ugrešić 52'; Petrović 62'; Janković 76'	Report

Partizan Stadium, Belgrade
Attendance: 650
Referee: Radoslav Gidzhenov (Bulgaria)

Partizan won 5–0 on aggregate.

4 October 2023
16:00 (17:00 UTC+3)

Olympiacos (Greece)	3–1	(Italy) Lecce
Papakanellos 20'; C. Kostoulas 71'; Pnevmonidis 86'	Report	Paşcalău 61'

Olympiacos FC Training Centre, Piraeus
Attendance: 858
Referee: Bulat Sariyev (Kazakhstan)
25 October 2023
20:30

Lecce (Italy)	1–3	(Greece) Olympiacos
Helm 60'	Report	Mouzakitis 7' (pen.); K. Kostoulas 19'; C. Kostoulas 75'

Stadio Via del mare, Lecce
Attendance: 2,198
Referee: Miloš Savović (Montenegro)

Olympiacos won 6–2 on aggregate.

4 October 2023
17:00 (18:00 UTC+3)

Dinamo Minsk (Belarus)	0–1	(Bulgaria) Ludogorets Razgrad
	Report	Todorov 90'

Eagles Nest Stadium, Razgrad, Bulgaria (Note: Due to the country's involvement in the Russian invasion of Ukraine, Belarusian teams were required to play their home matches at neutral venues and behind closed doors until further notice.)
Attendance: 0
Referee: Antoine Chiaramonti (Andorra)
8 October 2023
17:00 (18:00 UTC+3)

Ludogorets Razgrad (Bulgaria)	0–2	(Belarus) Dinamo Minsk
	Report	Melnichenko 12'; Budzko 67' (pen.)

Eagles Nest Stadium, Razgrad
Attendance: 247
Referee: Igor Stojchevski (North Macedonia)

Dinamo Minsk won 2–1 on aggregate.

4 October 2023
18:00 (19:00 UTC+3)

Maribor (Slovenia)	0–2	(Germany) Mainz 05
	Report	Wiesnet 27'; Dardari 70'

Ljudski vrt, Maribor
Attendance: 2,465
Referee: Oliver Reitala (Finland)
25 October 2023
18:30

Mainz 05 (Germany)	1–1	(Slovenia) Maribor
Kalemba 48'	Report	Dukarić 28'

Bruchwegstadion, Mainz
Attendance: 3,000
Referee: Miloš Milanović (Serbia)

Mainz 05 won 3–1 on aggregate.

4 October 2023
19:00

Gent (Belgium)	0–1	(Switzerland) Basel
	Report	Onyegbule 2'

PGB Stadion, Ghent
Attendance: 700
Referee: Genc Nuza (Kosovo)
25 October 2023
19:00

Basel (Switzerland)	2–0	(Belgium) Gent
Avdullahu 16'; Zé 36'	Report

Leichtathletik-Stadion St. Jakob, Basel
Attendance: 1,200
Referee: Erkan Özdamar (Turkey)

Basel won 3–0 on aggregate.

4 October 2023
14:00

Dinamo Zagreb (Croatia)	2–1	(Turkey) İstanbul Başakşehir
Graonić 54'; Čaić 82'	Report	Güreler 74'

Stadion Kranjčevićeva, Zagreb
Attendance: 247
Referee: Jovan Kachevski (North Macedonia)
25 October 2023
13:00 (14:00 UTC+3)

İstanbul Başakşehir (Turkey)	1–3	(Croatia) Dinamo Zagreb
Halidi 66'	Report	Košćević 32', 50'; Miljak 89'

Esenler Stadium, Istanbul
Attendance: 280
Referee: Martin Dohál (Slovakia)

Dinamo Zagreb won 5–2 on aggregate.

4 October 2023
14:00 (16:00 UTC+4)

Gabala (Azerbaijan)	1–1	(Hungary) Puskás Akadémia
Shahniyarov 8'	Report	Umathum 36' (pen.)

Gabala City Stadium, Qabala
Attendance: 110
Referee: Sayat Karabayev (Kazakhstan)
25 October 2023
16:30

Puskás Akadémia (Hungary)	0–1	(Azerbaijan) Gabala
	Report	Bakhishov 56'

Pancho Aréna, Felcsút
Attendance: 320
Referee: Mohammad Usman Aslam (Norway)

Gabala won 2–1 on aggregate.

== Second round ==
=== Summary ===
The first legs were played on 7, 8, and 29 November and the second legs were played on 22, 28, 29 November, and 3 December 2023.

Team 1	Agg.	Team 2	1st leg	2nd leg
Rukh Lviv (Ukraine)	1–4	(Denmark) Midtjylland	0–4	1–0
Nantes (France)	1–1 (4–3 p)	(Finland) HJK	1–0	0–1
Molde (Norway)	3–6	(Netherlands) AZ	3–4	0–2
Sparta Prague (Czech Republic)	6–6 (2–4 p)	(Slovakia) Žilina	2–2	4–4
Basel (Switzerland)	2–0	(Croatia) Dinamo Zagreb	2–0	0–0
Gabala (Azerbaijan)	0–7	(Greece) Olympiacos	0–3	0–4
Mainz 05 (Germany)	3–2	(Belarus) Dinamo Minsk	1–1	2–1
Sheriff Tiraspol (Moldova)	4–5	(Serbia) Partizan	2–0	2–5

=== Matches ===
8 November 2023
14:00

Rukh Lviv (Ukraine)	0–4	(Denmark) Midtjylland
	Report	Krüger-Johnsen 17'; Iheanacho 57', 71' (pen.); Kristjánsson 87'

Subcarpathian Football Center, Stalowa Wola, Poland
Attendance: 100
Referee: Patrik Kolarić (Croatia)
29 November 2023
14:00

Midtjylland (Denmark)	0–1	(Ukraine) Rukh Lviv
	Report	Kholod 90+2'

Ikast Stadium, Ikast
Attendance: 387
Referee: Tomáš Klíma (Czech Republic)

Midtjylland won 4–1 on aggregate.

8 November 2023
19:00

Nantes (France)	1–0	(Finland) HJK
Zézé 18' (pen.)	Report

Stade de la Beaujoire, Nantes
Attendance: 12,450
Referee: Ishmael Barbara (Malta)
22 November 2023
17:30 (18:30 UTC+2)

HJK (Finland)	1–0	(France) Nantes
Ezeh 74'	Report
Penalties
Ezeh (penalty missed); Baranov (penalty scored); Möller (penalty scored); Ritari (penalty scored); Simojoki (penalty missed)	3–4	(penalty scored) Zézé; (penalty missed) Appuah; (penalty scored) David; (penalty scored) Mongo; (penalty scored) Toure

Bolt Arena, Helsinki
Attendance: 1,413
Referee: Stefan Ebner (Austria)

1–1 on aggregate; Nantes won 4–3 on penalties.

7 November 2023
17:00

Molde (Norway)	3–4	(Netherlands) AZ
Nyheim 47' (pen.), 49'; Ødegård 90+4' (pen.)	Report	Dekkers 20'; Addai 25'; Van den Ban 57'; Daal 73'

Aker Stadion, Molde
Attendance: 0
Referee: Vitālijs Spasjoņņikovs (Latvia)
28 November 2023
17:00

AZ (Netherlands)	2–0	(Norway) Molde
Dijkstra 13'; Smit 77'	Report

AZ Training Centre, Wijdewormer
Attendance: 421
Referee: Viktor Kopiyevskyi (Ukraine)

AZ won 6–3 on aggregate.

8 November 2023
13:00

Sparta Prague (Czech Republic)	2–2	(Slovakia) Žilina
Říha 36'; Lilling 82' (pen.)	Report	Sauer 30'; Kóša 59'

Stadion Lokomotiva Praha, Prague
Attendance: 350
Referee: Jóhan Hendrik Ellefsen (Faroe Islands)
29 November 2023
16:30

Žilina (Slovakia)	4–4	(Czech Republic) Sparta Prague
Vaľko 12', 59'; Sauer 77'; Beňadik 90+3'	Report	Stárek 32'; Říha 70'; Hranoš 71'; Rus 78'
Penalties
Vaľko (penalty scored); Hranica (penalty scored); Šamaj (penalty scored); Sauer (penalty scored)	4–2	(penalty scored) Hranoš; (penalty missed) Vaněk; (penalty scored) Lilling; (penalty missed) Saal

Štadión pod Dubňom, Žilina
Attendance: 4,052
Referee: Jakob A. Sundberg (Denmark)

6–6 on aggregate; Žilina won 4–2 on penalties.

8 November 2023
19:00

Basel (Switzerland)	2–0	(Croatia) Dinamo Zagreb
Onyegbule 14'; Beney 33'	Report

Leichtathletik-Stadion St. Jakob, Basel
Attendance: 2,400
Referee: Kyriakos Athanasiou (Cyprus)
29 November 2023
14:00

Dinamo Zagreb (Croatia)	0–0	(Switzerland) Basel
	Report

Stadion Maksimir, Zagreb
Attendance: 528
Referee: Gustavo Correia (Portugal)

Basel won 2–0 on aggregate.

8 November 2023
13:00 (16:00 UTC+4)

Gabala (Azerbaijan)	0–3	(Greece) Olympiacos
	Report	Mouzakitis 4' (pen.); C. Kostoulas 65'; Darviras 87'

Gabala City Stadium, Qabala
Attendance: 280
Referee: Goga Kikacheishvili (Georgia)
29 November 2023
16:00 (17:00 UTC+2)

Olympiacos (Greece)	4–0	(Azerbaijan) Gabala
Mouzakitis 15', 71' (pen.); Gatopoulos 56'; Koutsogoulas 90+3' (pen.)	Report

Olympiacos FC Training Centre, Piraeus
Attendance: 1,580
Referee: Jamie Robinson (Northern Ireland)

Olympiacos won 7–0 on aggregate.

29 November 2023
18:30

Mainz 05 (Germany)	1–1	(Belarus) Dinamo Minsk
Gleiber 50'	Report	Melnichenko 13'

Bruchwegstadion, Mainz
Attendance: 2,250
Referee: Jan Machálek (Czech Republic)
3 December 2023
13:00

Dinamo Minsk (Belarus)	1–2	(Germany) Mainz 05
Budko 43'	Report	Kljajić 33'; Gleiber 90+4'

Bruchwegstadion, Mainz, Germany
Attendance: 30
Referee: Jérémy Muller (Luxembourg)

Mainz 05 won 3–2 on aggregate.

8 November 2023
13:00 (14:00 UTC+2)

Sheriff Tiraspol (Moldova)	2–0	(Serbia) Partizan
Boţan 8'; Dijinari 15'	Report

Malaya Sportivnaya Arena, Tiraspol
Attendance: 486
Referee: Kaspar Sjöberg (Sweden)
28 November 2023
18:00 (19:00 UTC+2)

Partizan (Serbia)	5–2	(Moldova) Sheriff Tiraspol
Jovanović 24', 34'; Trifunović 25', 73'; Mirčetić 65'	Report	Dijinari 80', 90+3'

Partizan Stadium, Belgrade
Attendance: 325
Referee: Pierre Gaillouste (France)

Partizan won 5–4 on aggregate.
