= 2024–25 Lyngby Boldklub season =

Lyngby Boldklub
2024–25 season
- Manager: Morten Karlsen
- Stadium: Lyngby Stadion
- Danish Superliga: Pre-season
- Danish Cup: Pre-season

The 2024–25 season is the 104th season in the history of Lyngby Boldklub, and the club's third consecutive season in the Danish Superliga. In addition to the domestic league, the team is scheduled to participate in the Danish Cup.

== Transfers ==
=== In ===
Pos.	Player	Transferred from	Fee	Date	Source
FW	(Iceland) Andri Guðjohnsen	(Sweden) IFK Norrköping	Undisclosed	1 July 2024	
MF	(Denmark) Mathias Hebo	(Poland) KS Cracovia	Free	4 July 2024	

=== Out ===
Pos.	Player	Transferred to	Fee	Date	Source
MF	(Denmark) Tochi Chukwuani	(Austria) Sturm Graz	Undisclosed	1 July 2024	
FW	(Iceland) Andri Guðjohnsen	(Belgium) K.A.A. Gent	Undisclosed	2 July 2024	
MF	(Burundi) Parfait Bizoza	(Norway) FK Haugesund	€45,000	17 July 2024	

== Friendlies ==
=== Pre-season ===
28 June 2024 Friendly	Lyngby (Denmark)	0–2	(Sweden) Malmö FF	Lyngby
15:00		Report	Christiansen 55'; Nanasi 82'	Stadium: Lyngby Stadion

6 July 2024 Friendly	Lyngby (Denmark)	0–4	(Denmark) Hvidovre IF
13:00
Note: 2 x 45 minutes + 30 minutes

10 July 2024 Friendly	Lyngby (Denmark)	0–3	(Denmark) Hillerød	Lyngby
13:00		Report	Tobias Arndal 41'; Adrian Justinussen 58'; Donovan Bagou 84'	Stadium: Lyngby Stadion

13 July 2024 Friendly	Lyngby (Denmark)	4–0	(Sweden) Landskrona BoIS	Lyngby
11:00	1' (o.g.); Frederik Gytkjær 59'; Tobias Storm 70'; Casper Winther 81'	Report		Stadium: Lyngby Stadion

In September 2024, Lyngby earned a goalless draw against AGF, reflecting improved performance early in the season.

== Competitions ==
=== Overall record ===
Competition	First match	Last match	Starting round	Record							
Competition	First match	Last match	Starting round	Pld	W	D	L	GF	GA	GD	Win %
Superliga	22 July 2024		Matchday 1	2	0	1	1	1	3	−2	0.00
Danish Cup				0	0	0	0	0	0	+0	—
Total				2	0	1	1	1	3	−2	0.00

Last updated: 26 July 2024
Source: Soccerway

=== Superliga ===
==== League table ====
Pos	Team	Pld	W	D	L	GF	GA	GD	Pts	Qualification
8	Viborg	22	7	7	8	38	39	−1	28	Qualification for the Relegation round
9	AaB	22	5	6	11	23	41	−18	21	Qualification for the Relegation round
10	Lyngby	22	3	9	10	15	26	−11	18	Qualification for the Relegation round
11	Sønderjyske	22	4	5	13	26	51	−25	17	Qualification for the Relegation round
12	Vejle	22	3	4	15	24	50	−26	13	Qualification for the Relegation round

Source: Danish Football Association (in Danish), Soccerway
Rules for classification: 1) Points; 2) Goal difference; 3) Goals scored; 4) Away goals scored; 5) Play-off (played on neutral ground if determining teams for different rounds); 6) Draw.

Pos	Team	Pld	W	D	L	GF	GA	GD	Pts	
1	Copenhagen (C)	32	18	9	5	60	33	+27	63	Qualification for the UEFA Champions League second qualifying round
2	Midtjylland	32	19	5	8	64	42	+22	62	Qualification for the UEFA Europa League second qualifying round
3	Brøndby	32	13	12	7	58	46	+12	51	Qualification for the UEFA Conference League second qualifying round
4	Randers	32	13	9	10	57	50	+7	48	Qualification for the European play-off match
5	Nordsjælland	32	13	7	12	53	56	−3	46	
6	AGF	32	10	10	12	53	46	+7	40	

Source: Danish Football Association (in Danish), Soccerway
Rules for classification: 1) Points; 2) Goal difference; 3) Goals scored; 4) Away goals scored; 5) Play-off (played on neutral ground if determining teams for different rounds); 6) Draw.
(C) Champions

Pos	Team	Pld	W	D	L	GF	GA	GD	Pts	
2	Viborg	32	12	11	9	57	50	+7	47	
3	Sønderjyske	32	10	7	15	47	64	−17	37	
4	Vejle	32	7	7	18	37	64	−27	28	
5	Lyngby (R)	32	5	12	15	26	43	−17	27	Relegation to 1st Division
6	AaB (R)	32	5	9	18	34	67	−33	24	Relegation to 1st Division

Source: Danish Football Association (in Danish), Soccerway
Rules for classification: 1) Points; 2) Goal difference; 3) Goals scored; 4) Away goals scored; 5) Play-off (played on neutral ground if determining teams for different rounds); 6) Draw.
(R) Relegated

During the 2024–25 Superliga season, Lyngby drew 1–1 against Brøndby IF on 3 March 2025 and won 3–1 against AaB on 24 May 2025.

==== Results summary ====
Overall								Home						Away					
Pld	W	D	L	GF	GA	GD	Pts	W	D	L	GF	GA	GD	W	D	L	GF	GA	GD
2	0	1	1	1	3	−2	1	0	0	1	0	2	−2	0	1	0	1	1	0

Last updated: 26 July 2024.

==== Results by round ====
Round	1	2
Ground	H	A
Result	L	D
Position		

Updated to match(es) played on 22 July 2024. Source:
A = Away; H = Home; W = Win; D = Draw; L = Loss

==== Matches ====
The match schedule was released on 7 June 2024.

22 July 2024 1	Lyngby	0–2	Copenhagen	Lyngby
19:00			Óskarsson 7'; Elyounoussi 30'	Stadium: Lyngby Stadion; Referee: Jakob Sundberg

26 July 2024 2	Sønderjyske	1–1	Lyngby	Haderslev
19:00	Sommer Sørensen 14'; Wilkins (yellow card) 31'; Haidara (yellow card) 88'; Björklund (yellow card) 90+5'		Gytkjær 20', (yellow card) 90+5'	Stadium: Haderslev Football Stadium; Referee: Simon Duerlund Rasmussen
