= Tobias Storm =

Danish footballer (born 2004)

Personal information
- Full name: Tobias Storm
- Date of birth: 4 July 2004 (age 22)
- Place of birth: Hørsholm, Denmark
- Height: 1.76 m (5 ft 9 in)
- Positions: Centre-back; right-back

Team information
- Current team: NEC
- Number: 14

Youth career
- HUI
- Lyngby

Senior career*
| Years | Team | Apps | (Gls) |
| 2021–2026 | Lyngby | 81 | (2) |
| 2026– | NEC | 9 | (0) |

International career^{‡}
| 2022 | Denmark U18 | 3 | (0) |
| 2022 | Denmark U19 | 3 | (1) |
| 2023 | Denmark U20 | 2 | (0) |
| 2025– | Denmark U21 | 10 | (0) |
- * Club domestic league appearances and goals as of 25 October 2026 ‡ National team caps and goals as of 22:15, 6 October 2026 (UTC)

Tobias Storm (トビアス・ストーム, Sutōmu Tobiasu; born 4 July 2004) is a Danish footballer who plays as a centre-back or right-back for Eredivisie club NEC Nijmegen.

== Career ==
=== Lyngby Boldklub ===
Born and raised in Hørsholm, Storm took his first football steps in the local club, Hørsholm-Usserød Idrætsklub. He later switched to Lyngby Boldklub as an U13 player, where he joined the club's academy.

Already at the age of 17, Storm started training with Lyngby's first team squad On 1 September 2021, Storm made his official debut for Lyngby in a cup match against Tårnby FF.

In August 2022, Storm signed his first professional contract with Lyngby until June 2026, which would only come into effect from the 2022–23 season, when he would also be permanently promoted to the first team squad. Later that month, Storm also made his debut in the Danish Superliga against Viborg FF. Storm, who was primarily used as a central midfielder during his youth, was retrained as a right back/right midfielder during the winter of 2023.

Storm really made his breakthrough in Lyngby in the 2023–24 season, where he played a total of 29 matches in all competitions, 16 of which were from the start. In the 2024–25 season, Storm started in the first 8 games of the season, but was injured at the end of September 2024; an injury that was expected to keep him out for the rest of the year.

== Career statistics ==
As of match played 25 October 2026

Appearances and goals by club, season and competition
| Club | Season | League | | | Cup | | Europe | | Other | | Total | |
| Club | Season | Division | Apps | Goals | Apps | Goals | Apps | Goals | Apps | Goals | Apps | Goals |
|---|---|---|---|---|---|---|---|---|---|---|---|---|
| Lyngby | 2021–22 | Danish Superliga | — | | 1 | 0 | — | | — | | 1 | 0 |
| Lyngby | 2022–23 | Danish Superliga | 15 | 0 | — | | — | | — | | 15 | 0 |
| Lyngby | 2023–24 | Danish Superliga | 26 | 0 | 3 | 0 | — | | — | | 29 | 0 |
| Lyngby | 2024–25 | Danish Superliga | 10 | 0 | 1 | 0 | — | | — | | 11 | 0 |
| Lyngby | 2025–26 | Danish Superliga | 30 | 2 | 1 | 0 | — | | — | | 31 | 2 |
| Lyngby | Total | | 81 | 2 | 6 | 0 | — | | — | | 87 | 2 |
| NEC | 2026–27 | Eredivisie | 9 | 0 | 0 | 0 | 6 (Note: Four appearances in UEFA Champions League, two appearances in UEFA Europa League) | 0 | — | | 15 | 0 |
| Career total | | | 90 | 2 | 6 | 0 | 6 | 0 | 0 | 0 | 102 | 2 |

== Honours ==
Lyngby

- Danish 1st Division: 2025–26
