= David Ezeh =

Finnish footballer (born 2006)

Personal information
- Date of birth: 13 February 2006 (age 20)
- Place of birth: Helsinki, Finland
- Height: 1.87 m (6 ft 2 in)
- Position: Centre-forward

Team information
- Current team: HJK
- Number: 19

Youth career
- –2014: Gnistan
- 2015–2018: HPS
- 2019–2022: HJK

Senior career*
Years	Team	Apps	(Gls)
2022–2024	Klubi 04	43	(23)
2023–	HJK	33	(3)
2024–2025	→ Raków Częstochowa (loan)	0	(0)
2024–2025	→ Raków Częstochowa II (loan)	12	(4)

International career^{‡}
2021–2022	Finland U16	5	(1)
2022–2023	Finland U17	15	(6)
2023–2024	Finland U18	7	(5)
2023–2025	Finland U19	8	(6)
2025–	Finland U21	2	(1)
Medal record
HJK
First place	Veikkausliiga	2023
First place	Finnish League Cup	2023
Finland U18
First place	Baltic Cup	2023
- * Club domestic league appearances and goals as of 24 July 2026 ‡ National team caps and goals as of 9 September 2025

David Ezeh (born 13 February 2006) is a Finnish professional footballer who plays as a centre-forward for HJK.

== Early life ==
Ezeh was born in Helsinki to Finnish mother and Igbo Nigerian father from Imo State, and was raised in Puistola and Oulunkylä. He started playing football in a youth team of IF Gnistan, after his family had moved to Oulunkylä. Before choosing football, his first sport was Greco-Roman wrestling, which lasted only six months. He moved to the youth team of Helsingin Palloseura (HPS) in 2015, and after four years with HPS, he joined the HJK Helsinki youth academy after the 2018 season. In October 2021, Ezeh was awarded the Best Player Trophy in the annual U15 Kai Pahlman tournament, organized by Finnish FA. Ezeh scored eight goals in six games, helping HJK youth team to win the tournament.

== Club career ==
=== HJK ===
On 14 January 2022, Ezeh signed his first professional contract with HJK, at the age of 15. He made his senior debut on 19 April 2022 with the club's reserve team Klubi 04 in the third tier level Kakkonen, in a 3–3 draw against Honka II. He made 19 appearances in total for Klubi 04 in the 2022 season, scoring four goals.

Ezeh's contract was extended on 4 January 2023 until the end of 2025, after he had trialed with Midtjylland for a week. He made his Veikkausliiga debut on 29 April 2023 against Haka at the age of 17, coming in from the bench for the final minutes, as a substitute for Bojan Radulović. In the 2023 season, Ezeh mostly played for Klubi 04, scoring 18 goals in 24 matches in the division, making him the top goalscorer in Kakkonen Group A. He was also named the player of the year in the Group A.

Ezeh represented HJK in the 2023–24 UEFA Youth League campaign, scoring three goals and providing an assist in four matches, against Malmö FF Youth and Nantes Youth.

He scored his first goal in Veikkausliiga on 6 April 2024, in the opening match of the 2024 season, in a 3–1 away loss against Kuopion Palloseura (KuPS). On 11 May 2024, his deal was extended until the end of the 2026 season.

==== Raków Częstochowa (loan) ====
On 22 July 2024, Ezeh was loaned out to Polish Ekstraklasa club Raków Częstochowa until 20 March 2025 with an option to buy. In January 2025, he returned to HJK, without making an appearance for Raków's first team.

== International career ==
A regular Finnish youth international, Ezeh has represented Finland in various age brackets from U16 to U19 level, scoring at every level.

In March 2022, Ezeh was part of the Finland U17 squad in the 2022 UEFA European Under-17 Championship qualification Elite round matches against Portugal, Bulgaria and Ireland.

In September 2022, Ezeh was named in the Finland U17 squad for the 2023 UEFA European Under-17 Championship qualification tournament against Greece, Italy and Kosovo, scoring one goal in three games. Finland finished 2nd in the group and qualified for the Elite round in March 2023.

Ezeh was part of the Finland U18 squad winning the friendly tournament Baltic Cup in June 2023, scoring two goals in three games.

In October 2023, Ezeh was part of the Finland U19 squad in the 2024 UEFA European Under-19 Championship qualification tournament, scoring three goals in three games against Romania, Czech Republic and San Marino.

== Career statistics ==
As of 4 June 2025

Appearances and goals by club, season and competition
Club	Season	Division	League		National cup (Note: Includes Suomen Cup)		League cup (Note: Includes Finnish League Cup)		Europe		Total	
Club	Season	Division	Apps	Goals	Apps	Goals	Apps	Goals	Apps	Goals	Apps	Goals
Klubi 04	2022	Kakkonen	18	4	1	0	—		—		19	4
Klubi 04	2023	Kakkonen	24	18	0	0	—		—		24	18
Klubi 04	2024	Ykkönen	1	1	—		—		—		1	1
Klubi 04	Total		43	23	1	0	0	0	0	0	44	23
HJK	2023	Veikkausliiga	1	0	0	0	4	0	0	0	5	0
HJK	2024	Veikkausliiga	10	1	1	2	2	0	0	0	13	3
HJK	2025	Veikkausliiga	7	1	1	1	4	0	0	0	12	2
HJK	Total		18	2	2	3	10	0	0	0	30	5
Raków Częstochowa (loan)	2024–25	Ekstraklasa	0	0	0	0	—		—		0	0
Raków Częstochowa II (loan)	2024–25	IV liga Silesia	12	4	—		—		—		12	4
Career total			73	29	3	3	10	0	0	0	86	32

== Honours ==
HJK

- Veikkausliiga: 2023
- Finnish Cup: 2025
- Finnish League Cup: 2023

Finland U18

- Baltic Cup: 2023

Individual

- Kakkonen Group A Player of the Year: 2023
- Kakkonen Group A Top scorer: 2023
