= João Brandão =

Portuguese football coach (born 1982)

Personal information
- Full name: João Carlos Magalhães Brandão
- Date of birth: 28 August 1982 (age 44)

Team information
- Current team: Porto B (manager)

Managerial career
- Years: Team
- 2005–2008: Porto (youth)
- 2008–2009: Padroense (youth)
- 2010–2011: Padroense (youth)
- 2015–2017: Porto B (assistant)
- 2017–2018: Porto (youth)
- 2018–2019: Porto B (assistant)
- 2019–2021: Shakhtar Donetsk (assistant)
- 2021–2022: Al Duhail (assistant)
- 2022–2023: Botafogo (assistant)
- 2023–2024: Al-Nassr (assistant)
- 2024–: Porto B

João Carlos Magalhães Brandão (born 28 August 1982) is a Portuguese football coach who is the head coach of Porto B in Liga Portugal 2.

== Career ==
Brandão was under-15 manager at FC Porto in the mid-2000s, and of the older youth teams from 2015 to 2019. He spent several years as an assistant to Luís Castro at FC Porto B, FC Shakhtar Donetsk, Al Duhail SC, Botafogo FR, and Al-Nassr FC.

On 29 June 2024, Brandão signed a two-year deal to replace António Folha as head coach of Porto B in Liga Portugal 2. His debut on 11 August was a 1–1 draw at home to FC Alverca; a 4–1 home loss to rivals S.L. Benfica B on the final day of the season meant his team finished 14th. After finishing 5th in 2025–26, he extended his contract to 2028.

== Personal life ==
Brandão's father Fernando, known as Moreno, was a long-time kitman at Porto.

== Managerial statistics ==
As of 17 May 2026

Managerial record by team and tenure
| Team | Nat. | From | To | Record | | | | | | | |
| Team | Nat. | From | To | G | W | D | L | GF | GA | GD | Win % |
|---|---|---|---|---|---|---|---|---|---|---|---|
| Porto B | (Portugal) | July 2024 | Present | 68 | 23 | 17 | 28 | 77 | 89 | −12 | 33.82 |
| Total | | | | 68 | 23 | 17 | 28 | 77 | 89 | −12 | 33.82 |
