= FC Porto B =

Portuguese football club

Porto B
- Full name: Futebol Clube do Porto B
- Founded: 1999 (original); 2012 (refoundation)
- Ground: CTFD PortoGaia
- Capacity: 3,800
- President: André Villas-Boas
- Head coach: João Brandão
- League: Liga Portugal 2
- 2025–26: Liga Portugal 2, 5th of 18
- Website: fcporto.pt
Home colours	Away colours	Third colours

Futebol Clube do Porto B, commonly known as Porto B, is a Portuguese professional football team, which serves as the reserve side of FC Porto. They compete in the Liga Portugal 2, the second division of Portuguese football, and play their home matches at the CTFD PortoGaia main pitch.

As a reserve side, the team cannot compete in the same division as their senior team, thus being ineligible for promotion to the Primeira Liga. In addition, they cannot participate in other domestic cup competitions, such as the Taça de Portugal and Taça da Liga.

Domestically, Porto B are the first and only reserve side to have won the second division title, after a successful campaign in the 2015–16 season. Internationally, the team is the record holder of the Premier League International Cup competition, after two wins in the 2016–17 and 2017–18 editions.

== History ==
=== Revival ===
Prior to the end of the 2011–12 season, seven Primeira Liga clubs announced their interest in creating a B team to fill the six vacancies available in for the 2012–13 Segunda Liga season. Six of these clubs were selected to have their B teams take part in the competition: Benfica, Braga, Marítimo, Porto, Sporting CP, and Vitória de Guimarães.

The LPFP, which governs professional football in Portugal, announced that for B teams to compete in the 2012–13 Segunda Liga they would have to pay a fee of €50,000. In addition, the LPFP would also require teams to follow new rules regarding player selection, such as having a minimum of ten players formed at the club's academy and with an age requirement of 15–21 years old, with a maximum of three players above 23 years old allowed. The LPFP also decided that B teams were ineligible to compete in cup competitions, as well as gaining promotion to the Primeira Liga due to the possibility of playing against the senior team.

In late May 2012, it was officially announced that the B teams of six Primeira Liga clubs would compete in the 2012–13 Segunda Liga. This decision resulted in an expansion of the number of teams from 16 to 22, and the number of matches from 30 to 42.

In 2013–14 the side, led for most of the season by Luís Castro, finished as runners-up but were ineligible for promotion. Two years later, with Castro back in charge and André Silva scoring 14 times, the team won the league by five points.

== Players ==
=== Current squad ===
As of 14 September 2026

Note: Flags indicate national team as defined under FIFA eligibility rules; some limited exceptions apply. Players may hold more than one non-FIFA nationality.

No.	Pos.	Nation	Player
41	GK	POR	Gonçalo Silva
43	FW	BLR	Trofim Melnichenko
46	FW	SEN	Mame Niang
47	FW	POR	Cardoso Varela
53	FW	POR	Eduardo Ferreira
54	DF	POR	António Ribeiro
55	DF	POR	Yoan Pereira
56	MF	BRA	Kauê Rodrigues
57	FW	POR	Duarte Cunha
58	MF	POR	Tiago Silva
61	FW	ANG	Domingos Muxito
64	DF	POR	Luís Gomes
66	MF	POR	Bernardo Lima
68	MF	POR	André Oliveira

No.	Pos.	Nation	Player
70	MF	NOR	Eirik Granaas
72	FW	POR	André Miranda
73	DF	DEN	Hjalte Froholdt (on loan from Lyngby)
76	DF	POR	Dinis Rodrigues
80	DF	ITA	Emanuel Benjamín
84	DF	POR	Martim Cunha
87	FW	COL	Brayan Caicedo
89	FW	POR	Mateus Mide
91	GK	POR	Gonçalo Ribeiro
92	MF	POR	João Teixeira
93	DF	POR	Tiago Ferreira
94	DF	POR	Martim Chelmik
95	FW	POR	Anhá Candé
97	FW	BRA	Gabriel Veron

=== Out on loan ===
Note: Flags indicate national team as defined under FIFA eligibility rules; some limited exceptions apply. Players may hold more than one non-FIFA nationality.

No.	Pos.	Nation	Player
—	GK	POR	Diogo Fernandes (at Amarante until 30 June 2027)
—	DF	BRA	Felipe Silva (at Casa Pia until 30 June 2027)
—	DF	POR	Gabriel Brás (at NEC Nijmegen until 30 June 2027)

No.	Pos.	Nation	Player
—	FW	POR	Gonçalo Sousa (at Kocaelispor until 30 June 2027)
—	FW	CRO	Leonardo Vonić (at Moreirense until 30 June 2027)

== Staff ==
Position	Staff
Head coach	(Portugal) João Brandão
Assistant coaches	(Portugal) Abel Pimenta (Portugal) Diogo Paiva (Portugal) Paulinho Santos (Portugal) Tiago Sousa
Goalkeeper coach	(Portugal) Rafael Albuquerque
Performance and fitness coach	(Portugal) Ricardo Ribeiro

Last updated: 14 September 2026
Source: FC Porto B

== Seasons and managers statistics ==
=== League performance record ===
Information correct as of end of the 2025–26 season. Only competitive league matches are counted.

Season	Div	Pos	Pld	W	D	L	GF	GA	Pts	Top scorer(s)	Goals	Notes
1999–00	III	3rd	34	14	10	10	53	43	52	(Portugal) Pedras	13	
2000–01	III	3rd	38	18	10	10	74	52	64	(Portugal) Hélder Postiga	10	
2001–02	III	3rd	38	19	13	6	67	33	70	(Portugal) Pedro Oliveira	11	
2002–03	III	3rd	38	20	9	9	70	39	69	(Portugal) Hugo Almeida	16	
2003–04	III	4th	36	16	10	10	56	33	58	(Brazil) Bruno Moraes	11	
2004–05	III	5th	38	20	6	12	63	33	66	(Hungary) Ákos Buzsáky	9	
2005–06	III	6th	26	10	8	8	28	27	38	(Portugal) Hélder Barbosa	6	(Note: The team was abolished at the end of the season.)
2012–13	II	14th	42	13	15	14	49	50	54	(Brazil) Dellatorre	11	(Note: The team was reinstated and inserted in the Segunda Liga.)
2013–14	II	2nd	42	23	8	11	59	42	77	(Portugal) Tozé	21	
2014–15	II	13th	46	17	10	19	66	64	61	(Portugal) Frédéric Maciel	13	
2015–16	II	1st	46	26	8	12	84	52	86	(Portugal) André Silva	14	
2016–17	II	12th	42	16	12	14	52	49	60	(Brazil) Galeno	10	
2017–18	II	7th	38	18	4	16	50	55	58	(Portugal) André Pereira (Argentina) Fede Varela	8	
2018–19	II	9th	34	11	11	12	41	42	44	(Brazil) Gleison	6	
2019–20	II	13th	24	7	8	9	35	36	29	(Portugal) Vitinha	8	
2020–21	II	16th	34	7	11	16	45	52	32	(England) Danny Namaso	8	
2021–22	II	10th	34	10	12	12	45	49	42	(England) Danny Namaso	14	
2022–23	II	5th	34	14	9	11	48	40	51	(Nigeria) Abraham Marcus	9	
2023–24	II	10th	34	12	8	14	51	51	44	(Brazil) Wendel Silva	18	
2024–25	II	14th	34	8	11	15	36	47	35	(Spain) Ángel Alarcón (Croatia) Leonardo Vonić	7	
2025–26	II	5th	34	15	6	13	41	42	51	(Croatia) Leonardo Vonić	7	

Champions	Runners-up	Third place

=== Managerial statistics ===
Information correct as of the match played on 15 May 2026. Only competitive matches are counted.

Name	Nat	From	To	P	W	D	L	GF	GA	Win %	Honours	Refs
Fernando Bandeirinha	(Portugal)	June 1999	July 2000	34	14	10	10	53	43	41.18		
Ilídio Vale	(Portugal)	July 2000	July 2004	150	73	42	35	267	157	48.67		
Domingos Paciência	(Portugal)	July 2004	June 2005	38	20	6	12	63	33	52.63		
Aloísio	(Brazil)	June 2005	May 2006	26	10	8	8	28	27	38.46		
Rui Gomes	(Portugal)	June 2012	May 2013	42	13	15	14	49	50	30.95		
Luís Castro	(Portugal)	July 2013	March 2014	32	18	6	8	39	26	56.25		
José Guilherme	(Portugal)	March 2014	May 2014	10	5	2	3	20	16	50.00		
Luís Castro	(Portugal)	May 2014	November 2016	118	54	24	40	184	150	45.76	1 Segunda Liga	
José Tavares	(Portugal)	November 2016	December 2016	8	3	2	3	10	10	37.50		
António Folha	(Portugal)	December 2016	June 2018	68	36	9	23	96	79	52.94	2 PL International Cup	
Rui Barros	(Portugal)	June 2018	February 2021	82	22	25	35	106	125	26.83		
António Folha	(Portugal)	February 2021	June 2024	117	39	36	42	165	159	33.33		
João Brandão	(Portugal)	July 2024	Present	68	23	17	28	77	89	33.82		

== Honours ==
=== Domestic ===
- Segunda Liga
  - Winners (1): 2015–16
  - Runners-up (1): 2013–14

=== European ===
- Premier League International Cup
  - Winners (2): 2016–17, 2017–18
  - Runners-up (1): 2014–15

=== Others ===
- VFF Cup
  - Winners (1): 2004
