= Julian Oerip =

Dutch-Indonesian footballer

Personal information
- Full name: Julian Miles Oerip
- Date of birth: 26 October 2006 (age 20)
- Place of birth: Alkmaar, Netherlands
- Height: 1.79 m (5 ft 10 in)
- Position: Midfielder

Team information
- Current team: Jong AZ
- Number: 10

Youth career
- CSV Jong Holland
- –2017: AFC '34
- 2017–2024: AZ Alkmaar

Senior career*
Years	Team	Apps	(Gls)
2022–	Jong AZ	48	(6)

International career^{‡}
2021–2022	Netherlands U16	6	(1)
2022–2023	Netherlands U17	14	(1)
2023–2024	Netherlands U18	8	(1)
2024–2025	Netherlands U19	6	(1)
- * Club domestic league appearances and goals as of 17 October 2026 ‡ National team caps and goals as of 19 November 2024

Julian Miles Oerip (born 26 October 2006) is a professional footballer who plays as a midfielder for Eerste Divisie club Jong AZ.

== Club career ==
Oerip is a youth exponent from AZ Alkmaar, having played at various youth levels for the club since he joined in 2017. He made his debut for the Jong AZ in the Eerste Divisie match against Dordrecht.

== International career ==
Oerip represented the Netherlands under-16 football team, where he debuted in a friendly match against Belgium U16 on 23 November 2021. He is also eligible to represent Indonesia through his lineage from his maternal grandparents.

== Personal life ==
Born in the Netherlands, Oerip is of Indonesian descent.

== Career statistics ==
=== Club ===
As of match played 28 April 2025

Appearances and goals by club, season and competition
Club	Season	League			KNVB Cup		League cup		Continental		Other		Total	
Club	Season	Division	Apps	Goals	Apps	Goals	Apps	Goals	Apps	Goals	Apps	Goals	Apps	Goals
Jong AZ	2022–23	Eerste Divisie	1	0	0	0	–		–		0	0	1	0
Jong AZ	2023–24	Eerste Divisie	1	0	0	0	–		–		0	0	1	0
Jong AZ	2024–25	Eerste Divisie	19	2	0	0	–		–		0	0	19	2
Jong AZ	Total		21	2	0	0	0	0	0	0	0	0	21	2
Career total			21	2	0	0	0	0	0	0	0	0	21	2
