= Gonçalo Sousa =

Portuguese footballer, born 2006

Personal information
- Birth name: Gonçalo Santos Sousa
- Date of birth: 30 June 2006 (age 20)
- Place of birth: Ermesinde, Portugal
- Height: 1.86 m (6 ft 1 in)
- Position: Winger

Team information
- Current team: Kocaelispor (on loan from Porto B)
- Number: 11

Youth career
- 2014–2016: N.D. Colégio Ermesinde
- 2016–2023: Porto
- 2021–2022: → Padroense (loan)

Senior career*
Years	Team	Apps	(Gls)
2023–	Porto B	75	(8)
2024–	Porto	1	(0)
2026–	→ Kocaelispor (loan)	7	(0)

International career^{‡}
2022–2023	Portugal U17	17	(5)
2023–2024	Portugal U18	11	(3)
2024	Portugal U19	9	(2)
2025–	Portugal U20	9	(0)
- * Club domestic league appearances and goals as of 18 October 2026 ‡ National team caps and goals as of 2 October 2026

Gonçalo Santos Sousa is a Portuguese professional footballer who plays as a winger for Turkish Süper Lig club Kocaelispor on loan from Porto B.

== Early career ==
=== FC Porto ===
Born in Ermesinde, Portugal After scaling through the youth ranks of Porto, he was promoted to play with the reserve team ahead of the 2022/23 season, albeit making no appearances. The next season, he would go on to make 19 appearances for the B team. Sousa's Primeira Liga debut for FC Porto came on 4 May, 2024 in an away league match against GD Chaves in which he played the final 7 minutes of the game as Porto won 3-0. Sousa's contract expires on 30 June 2027.

== Honours ==
Porto

- Taça de Portugal: 2023–24
- Supertaça Cândido de Oliveira: 2024
