= Gabriel Brás =

Portuguese footballer, born 2004

Personal information
- Full name: Gabriel Costa Brás
- Date of birth: 25 March 2004 (age 22)
- Place of birth: Póvoa de Varzim, Portugal
- Height: 1.86 m (6 ft 1 in)
- Position: Centre back

Team information
- Current team: NEC Nijmegen (on loan from Porto B)
- Number: 73

Youth career
- 2012–2017: Varzim
- 2017–2024: Porto

Senior career*
Years	Team	Apps	(Gls)
2023–	Porto B	76	(2)
2026–	→ NEC Nijmegen (loan)	5	(0)

International career^{‡}
2019	Portugal U15	4	(1)
2019–2020	Portugal U16	12	(1)
2021–2022	Portugal U18	12	(1)
2022–2023	Portugal U19	13	(3)
2023–2024	Portugal U20	3	(0)
2024–	Portugal U21	8	(2)
Medal record
Men's football
Representing Portugal
UEFA European Under-19 Championship
Runner-up	2023 Malta
- * Club domestic league appearances and goals as of 10 October 2026 ‡ National team caps and goals as of 21:15, 6 October 2026 (UTC)

Gabriel Costa Brás (born 25 March 2004) is a Portuguese footballer who plays as a centre back for Dutch club NEC Nijmegen, on loan from Porto B, and the Portugal national under-21 team.

He joined the youth ranks of Porto in 2017 from local club Varzim, and made his debut for Porto B in Liga Portugal 2 in 2023, later becoming captain. He represented Portugal from under-15 to under-21 international level, and was chosen in the Team of the Tournament at the 2023 UEFA European Under-19 Championship, in which his team were runners-up.

== Club career ==
Born in Póvoa de Varzim in the Porto metropolitan area, Brás was raised in neighbouring Vila do Conde. He started playing football at local club Varzim before joining the youth ranks of Porto in 2017, and signing his first professional contract aged 16 in June 2020. In January 2023, while an under-19 player, his contract was extended by an undisclosed length.

Brás was added to the Porto B team in Liga Portugal 2 for 2023–24. He made his debut on 13 August in a goalless home draw with Tondela, and on 2 September, he headed his first goal to equalise in a 2–1 loss away to Mafra, as his team lost for the first time in the fourth fixture. In December, first-team manager Sérgio Conceição called up Brás and fellow reserve defender Romain Correia for a Taça da Liga match against Leixões, as David Carmo had been sent in the opposite direction.

On 2 December 2024, captain Brás headed the last-minute winner against Oliveirense. Thirteen days later, he suffered an injury in a goalless home draw with Feirense on 15 December 2024, and was ruled out for over a month. In June 2025, first-team manager Martín Anselmi called him up for the 28-man squad for the 2025 FIFA Club World Cup in the United States.

In 2025–26, Brás played 30 games for Porto B. On 13 August 2026 he was loaned to Dutch club NEC Nijmegen for a €100,000 fee and the option to buy 50% of his economic rights for €1.25 million.

== International career ==
Brás played with the Portugal under-15 team at a tournament in Austria in 2019, scoring in a 2–1 loss to the hosts on 29 April. On 6 February 2020, he equalised in a 3–1 home win over Colombia in Vila Real de Santo António for the under-16 team. He was the captain of the under-18 team at the football at the 2022 Mediterranean Games in Algeria.

At the 2023 UEFA European Under-19 Championship in Malta, Brás scored the opening goal of the tournament within four minutes of a 2–0 group win over Poland. Three days later he added another in a 5–1 win over Italy at the National Stadium, Ta' Qali. The two teams met again in the final which Italy won by a single goal; Brás was named in the Team of the Tournament.

On 11 October 2024, on his second cap for the under-21 team, Brás scored a header in a 3–1 win away to the Faroe Islands, in 2025 UEFA European Under-21 Championship qualification. A year and three days later in his next game, he contributed a goal to a record 11–0 win away to Gibraltar in the next qualification cycle.

== Career statistics ==
As of match played 22 October 2026

Appearances and goals by club, season and competition
Club	Season	League			National cup		League cup		Europe		Other		Total	
Club	Season	Division	Apps	Goals	Apps	Goals	Apps	Goals	Apps	Goals	Apps	Goals	Apps	Goals
Porto B	2022–23	Liga Portugal 2	0	0	—		—		—		3 (Note: Appearances in Premier League Cup)	0	3	0
Porto B	2023–24	Liga Portugal 2	21	0	—		—		—		—		21	0
Porto B	2024–25	Liga Portugal 2	25	1	—		—		—		—		25	1
Porto B	2025–26	Liga Portugal 2	30	1	—		—		—		—		30	1
Porto B	Total		76	2	—		—		—		3	0	79	2
NEC (loan)	2026–27	Eredivisie	4	0	0	0	—		2 (Note: Appearances in UEFA Europa League)	0	—		6	0
Career total			80	2	0	0	0	0	2	0	3	0	85	2
