= Georgios Tanoulis =

Greek basketball player

Georgios Tanoulis Γεώργιος Τανούλης
No. 50 – Aris Thessaloniki
- Position: Center / power forward
- League: GBL; EuroCup

Personal information
- Born: 27 July 2002 (age 24) Thessaloniki, Greece
- Listed height: 6 ft 10.5 in (2.10 m)
- Listed weight: 231 lb (105 kg)

Career information
- Playing career: 2019–present

Career history
- 2019–2020: PAOK Thessaloniki
- 2020–2023: Promitheas Patras
- 2023–2026: Olympiacos
- 2024–2025: →Maroussi
- 2025–2026: →Aris Thessaloniki
- 2026–present: Aris Thessaloniki

Career highlights
- Greek Cup winner (2024); 2× Greek Supercup winner (2020, 2023)

Georgios "Giorgos" Tanoulis (Greek: Γεώργιος Τανούλης, born 27 July 2002) is a Greek professional basketball player for Aris Thessaloniki. He is a 2.10 m (6'10) height power forward–center.

== Early life ==
Tanoulis was born in Thessaloniki, Greece and started playing basketball early for Aris Thessaloniki and PAOK Thessaloniki youth teams. While playing for PAOK Thessaloniki, Tanoulis dominated the Greek Youth Championship and he ended the 2019/20 season as a member of the top five players. In the five games of the finals, he had 16.4 points on 71% shooting, 52% on 2-pointers and 30% on 3-pointers, along with 8.6 rebounds and 3.4 assists.

== Professional career ==
=== PAOK Thessaloniki (2019–2020) ===
At the age of 17, Tanoulis made his Greek Basket League debut with PAOK Thessaloniki on 18 May 2019, against Promitheas Patras.

=== Promitheas Patras (2020–2023) ===
On 7 September 2020, Tanoulis signed a five-year contract with Promitheas Patras. Tanoulis made his debut with his new team on 6 October 2020, against Aquila Trento for the EuroCup. On 14 April 2022, Tanoulis set a personal career-high in points in a Greek Basket League game, scoring 16 points in a home loss against Olympiacos, which he later broke with 19 points against Larisa on 15 June 2022.

=== Olympiacos (2023–2026) ===
On 15 July 2023, Tanoulis signed with Olympiacos of the Greek Basket League and the EuroLeague. During his first season with the club, he won the Greek Basketball Cup.

For the 2024–25 season, Tanoulis was loaned to Maroussi. After returning to Olympiacos, he was loaned to Aris Thessaloniki for the 2025–26 season.

On 19 June 2026, Olympiacos announced the termination of Tanoulis' contract, ending his three-year spell with the club.

=== Aris Thessaloniki (2025–present) ===
Tanoulis joined Aris Thessaloniki on loan from Olympiacos in August 2025. On 3 September, during a preseason friendly against TFT Skopje, he suffered a rupture of the anterior cruciate ligament, along with injuries to the medial meniscus and medial collateral ligament. The injury ruled him out for the remainder of the 2025–26 season.

Following the termination of his contract with Olympiacos, Tanoulis joined Aris permanently as a free agent. On 21 June 2026, the club announced that he had signed a contract for the 2026–27 season, while he was in the final stage of his rehabilitation from the knee injury.

Tanoulis returned to team activities during Aris' preseason preparations in August 2026. On 25 August, however, he suffered a meniscus tear during practice. He underwent surgery the following day and was expected to remain sidelined for approximately one month.

== Greece men's national basketball team ==
Tanoulis has been a member of the junior national teams of Greece. With Greece's junior national teams, he has played at 2021 and 2022 FIBA U20 European Championship. He made his official debut with Greece men's national basketball team on 27 February 2023, against Latvian Basketball Association, in which he recorded 7 points.

== Career statistics ==
Legend
GP	Games played	GS	Games started	MPG	Minutes per game
FG%	Field-goal percentage	3P%	3-point field-goal percentage	FT%	Free-throw percentage
RPG	Rebounds per game	APG	Assists per game	SPG	Steals per game
BPG	Blocks per game	PPG	Points per game	PIR	Performance index rating
**Bold**	Career high

=== EuroLeague ===
Year	Team	GP	GS	MPG	FG%	3P%	FT%	RPG	APG	SPG	BPG	PPG	PIR
2023–24	Olympiacos	1	0	1.0	—	—	—	—	—	—	—	0.0	0.0
Career		1	0	1.0	—	—	—	—	—	—	—	0.0	0.0

=== EuroCup ===
Year	Team	GP	GS	MPG	FG%	3P%	FT%	RPG	APG	SPG	BPG	PPG	PIR
2020–21	Promitheas Patras	5	1	**15.4**	**.500**	.286	.571	2.0	.2	—	—	**5.2**	**2.4**
2021–22	Promitheas Patras	9	0	8.6	.440	.273	.400	**2.2**	.2	—	**.2**	3.2	2.0
2022–23	Promitheas Patras	**12**	**3**	9.8	.487	**.300**	**.579**	1.4	**.8**	**.3**	.1	4.3	**2.4**
Career		26	4	10.5	.476	.286	.528	1.8	.5	.1	.1	4.1	2.3

=== Domestic leagues ===
Year	Team	League	GP	MPG	FG%	3P%	FT%	RPG	APG	SPG	BPG	PPG
2018–19	(Greece) PAOK	HEBA A1	2	1.0	1.000	—	.000	—	—	—	—	1.0
2020–21	(Greece) Promitheas Patras	HEBA A1	7	2.8	.200	.000	.000	.3	.1	.1	—	0.3
2021–22	(Greece) Promitheas Patras	HEBA A1	23	11.6	.531	.367	.600	2.6	.6	.4	.1	5.6
2022–23	(Greece) Promitheas Patras	HEBA A1	14	8.9	.548	.200	.750	2.3	.6	.3	.1	3.8
2023–24	(Greece) Olympiacos	HEBA A1	15	6.0	.438	.286	.750	1.1	.4	.3	—	2.4

== Personal ==
His brother is footballer Konstantinos Tanoulis.
