= João Teixeira (footballer, born 2006) =

Portuguese footballer

Personal information
- Full name: João Pedro Moreira Teixeira
- Date of birth: 9 April 2006 (age 20)
- Place of birth: Vila Real, Portugal
- Height: 1.86 m (6 ft 1 in)
- Position: Midfielder

Team information
- Current team: Porto B
- Number: 92

Youth career
- 2013–2015: Diogo Cão
- 2015–: Porto

Senior career*
Years	Team	Apps	(Gls)
2024–	Porto B	61	(2)

International career^{‡}
2021–2022	Portugal U16	7	(0)
2022–2023	Portugal U17	13	(1)
2023–2024	Portugal U18	14	(2)
2024	Portugal U19	4	(1)
- * Club domestic league appearances and goals as of 19 June 2026 ‡ National team caps and goals as of 12:43, 24 December 2025 (UTC)

João Pedro Moreira Teixeira (born 9 April 2006) is a Portuguese footballer who plays as a midfielder for Porto B.

== Club career ==
Born in Vila Real, Teixeira played for local Diogo Cão before joining the youth team of Porto in 2015. In July 2022, the 16-year-old signed his first professional contract. He helped the under-19 team to the semi-finals of the 2023–24 UEFA Youth League, scoring the first goal of a 4–1 win away to Mainz 05 in the quarter-finals on 13 March.

On 8 April 2024, Teixeira made his senior debut for Porto B in Liga Portugal 2, coming on as a substitute at the end of a 2–0 win at Académico Viseu. In November, he extended his contract. He was one of several B-team players called up by first-team manager Martín Anselmi for the 2025 FIFA Club World Cup in the United States.

Teixeira scored his first senior goal on 6 December 2025, helping the B-team to a 4–2 win at nearby Leixões. During the season, he was called up to the first-team squad, and manager Francesco Farioli said "I'm impressed. He has an interesting profile, he is explosive and has technical quality".

== International career ==
Teixeira was part of the Portugal under-17 team at the 2023 UEFA European Under-17 Championship in Hungary. He made one substitute appearance in a 2–1 win over Scotland in Debrecen, as neither team advanced to the knockout stage.
