= Enzo Mongo =

French footballer (born 2005)

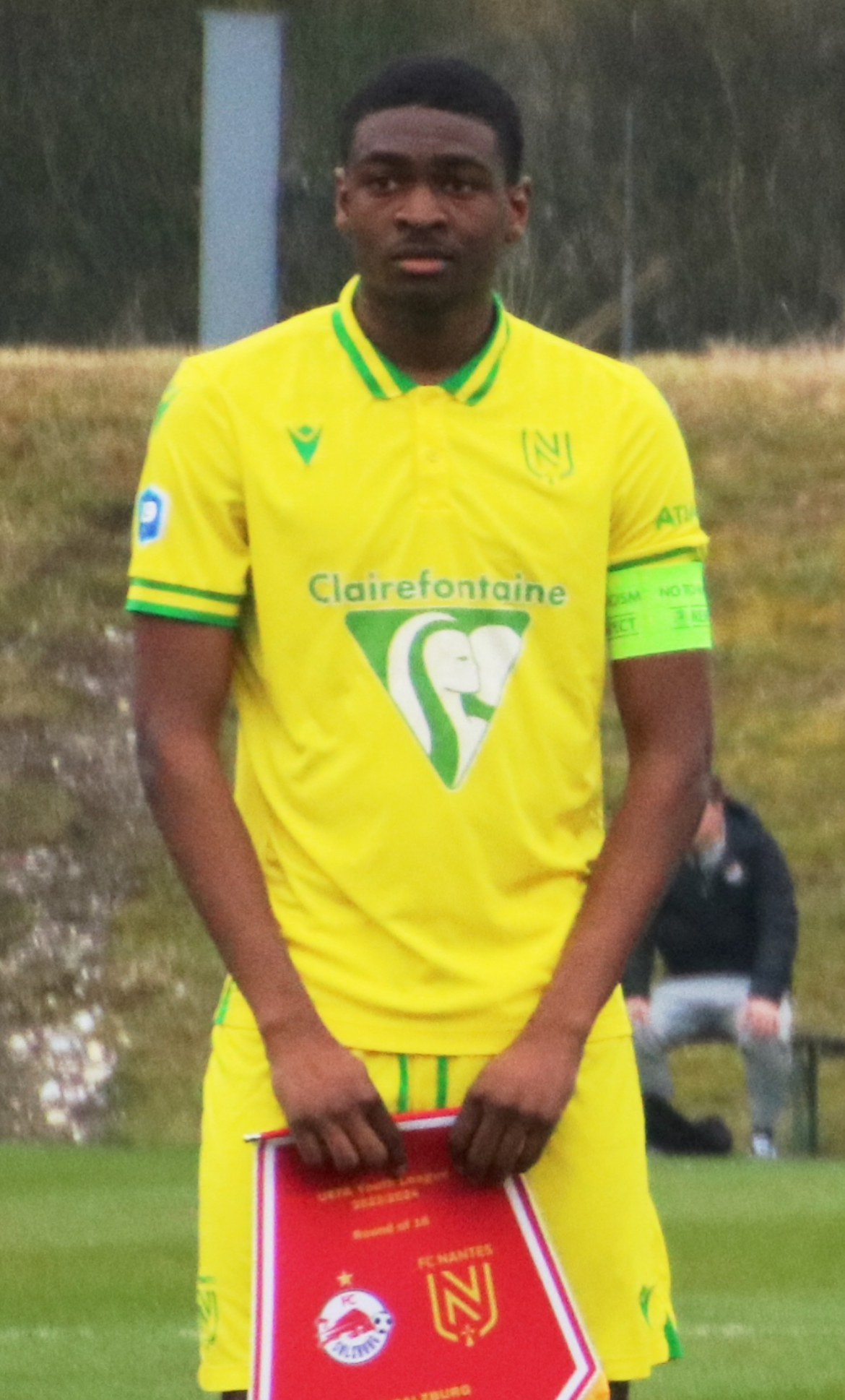

Personal information
- Date of birth: 8 April 2005 (age 21)
- Place of birth: Sarcelles, France
- Height: 1.85 m (6 ft 1 in)
- Position: Centre-back

Team information
- Current team: Nantes
- Number: 46

Youth career
- –2020: AAS Sarcelles
- 2020–2024: Nantes

Senior career*
| Years | Team | Apps | (Gls) |
| 2023– | Nantes B | 16 | (1) |
| 2024– | Nantes | 1 | (0) |
- * Club domestic league appearances and goals as of 22:17, 17 May 2025 (UTC)

Enzo Mongo (born 8 April 2005) is a French professional footballer who plays as a centre-back for Ligue 2 club Nantes.

== Career ==
Mongo was recruited by Nantes from Sarcelles in 2020. In 2023, he was a starter in the Nantes under-19 team that won the Championnat National U19, playing 90 minutes in the 2–1 win over Paris Saint-Germain in the final. On 11 February 2024, Mongo made his professional and Ligue 1 debut in a 2–1 win away to Toulouse, having come on as a substitute in the 82nd minute. On 3 April 2024, during an under-19 league game against Rennes, he suffered an anterior cruciate ligament (ACL) injury, meaning he would miss the semi-finals of the UEFA Youth League as his team's captain.

== Personal life ==
Born in France, Mongo is of DR Congolese descent.

== Career statistics ==
As of match played 17 May 2025

Appearances and goals by club, season and competition
| Club | Season | League | | | Cup | | Europe | | Other | | Total | |
| Club | Season | Division | Apps | Goals | Apps | Goalss | Apps | Goals | Apps | Goals | Apps | Goals |
|---|---|---|---|---|---|---|---|---|---|---|---|---|
| Nantes B | 2022–23 | Championnat National 2 | 2 | 0 | — | | — | | — | | 2 | 0 |
| Nantes B | 2023–24 | Championnat National 2 | 5 | 0 | — | | — | | — | | 5 | 0 |
| Nantes B | 2024–25 | Championnat National 3 | 9 | 1 | — | | — | | — | | 9 | 1 |
| Nantes B | 2025–26 | Championnat National 3 | 0 | 0 | — | | — | | — | | 0 | 0 |
| Nantes B | Total | | 16 | 1 | — | | — | | — | | 16 | 1 |
| Nantes | 2023–24 | Ligue 1 | 1 | 0 | 0 | 0 | — | | — | | 1 | 0 |
| Career total | | | 17 | 1 | 0 | 0 | 0 | 0 | 0 | 0 | 17 | 1 |

== Honours ==
Nantes U19

- Championnat National U19: 2022–23
