= António Ribeiro (footballer, born 2004) =

Portuguese association football player

Personal information
- Full name: António Teixeira Ribeiro
- Date of birth: 21 March 2004 (age 22)
- Place of birth: Maia, Portugal
- Height: 1.83 m (6 ft 0 in)
- Position: Centre back

Team information
- Current team: Porto B
- Number: 54

Youth career
- 2013–2015: Gondim-Maia
- 2015–2016: Colégio Ermesinde
- 2016–2024: Porto
- 2019–2020: → Padroense (loan)

Senior career*
Years	Team	Apps	(Gls)
2023–	Porto B	23	(0)

International career
2019	Portugal U15	3	(0)
2019–2020	Portugal U16	11	(0)
2022	Portugal U18	7	(0)
2022–2023	Portugal U19	9	(0)
2024	Portugal U20	1	(0)
Medal record
Men's football
Representing Portugal
UEFA European Under-19 Championship
Runner-up	2023 Malta
- * Club domestic league appearances and goals as of 19 June 2026

António Teixeira Ribeiro (born 21 March 2004) is a Portuguese footballer who plays as a centre back for Porto B.

== Club career ==
Born in Maia in the Porto metropolitan area, Ribeiro began playing as a youth for Gondim-Maia and Colégio Ermesinde before joining the youth ranks of Porto in 2017. In June 2023, after a season as captain of the under-19 team, he renewed his contract and was promoted to the B-team.

Ribeiro made his professional debut on 20 August 2023 in the second game of the Liga Portugal 2 season, a 1–1 draw away to Belenenses, as a substitute for the last six minutes. Back in the under-19 team, he helped them to the semi-finals of the UEFA Youth League of 2023–24, scoring their late equaliser in a 1–1 draw away to reigning champions AZ Alkmaar in the last 16 before a penalty shootout victory.

In August 2024, Ribeiro suffered a traumatic brain injury in a pre-season friendly against Nacional. He was discharged after nine days in hospital.

== International career ==
Ribeiro was part of the Portugal under-19 squad at the 2023 UEFA European Under-19 Championship in Malta, losing the final 1–0 to Italy.
