= Cristian David (footballer) =

Colombian footballer (born 2005)

Cristian Perea
Personal information
- Full name: Cristian David Perea Cajiao
- Date of birth: 17 August 2005 (age 21)
- Place of birth: Lleida, Spain
- Height: 1.73 m (5 ft 8 in)
- Positions: Defensive midfielder; centre-back

Team information
- Current team: CFR Cluj
- Number: 66

Youth career
- 2009–2010: Almería
- 2010–2017: Pavía
- 2017–2024: Real Madrid

Senior career*
Years	Team	Apps	(Gls)
2024–2025	Real Madrid C	28	(0)
2024–2026	Real Madrid B	31	(0)
2026–	CFR Cluj	0	(0)

International career^{‡}
2024	Spain U19	7	(0)
2025	Spain U20	4	(0)
Medal record
Men's football
Representing Spain
UEFA European Under-19 Championship
Winner	2024 Northern Ireland
- * Club domestic league appearances and goals as of 8 September 2026 ‡ National team caps and goals as of 11 October 2025

Cristian David Perea Cajiao (born 17 August 2005) is a Spanish professional footballer who plays aas a defensive midfielder or a centre-back for Liga I club CFR Cluj.

== Early life ==
Cristian David started playing football at the age of four.

== Career ==
As a youth player, Cristian David joined the youth academy of Spanish La Liga side Real Madrid, where he was regarded as one of the club's most important players.

== Personal life ==
Cristian David is of Colombian descent.

== Career statistics ==
As of match played 9 May 2026

Appearances and goals by club, season and competition
Club	Season	League			National Cup		Other		Total	
Club	Season	Division	Apps	Goals	Apps	Goals	Apps	Goals	Apps	Goals
Real Madrid C	2024–25	Segunda Federación	28	0	—		2 (Note: Appearances in Segunda Federación relegation play-offs)	0	30	0
Real Madrid B	2024–25	Primera Federación	4	0	—		—		4	0
Real Madrid B	2025–26	Primera Federación	27	0	—		0	0	27	0
Real Madrid B	2026–27	Primera Federación	0	0	—		—		27	0
Real Madrid B	Total		31	0	—		0	0	31	0
CFR Cluj	2026–27	Liga I	0	0	0	0	—		0	0
Career total			59	0	0	0	2	0	61	0

== Honours ==
Spain U19

- UEFA European Under-19 Championship: 2024
