= Konstantinos Tanoulis =

Greek footballer

Personal information
- Full name: Konstantinos Tanoulis
- Date of birth: 7 March 2005 (age 21)
- Place of birth: Thessaloniki, Greece
- Height: 1.90 m (6 ft 3 in)
- Position: Centre-back

Team information
- Current team: Olympiacos B
- Number: 50

Youth career
- Aris
- 2023–2025: Olympiacos

Senior career*
Years	Team	Apps	(Gls)
2022–2023	Aris	0	(0)
2023–	Olympiacos B	25	(2)
- * Club domestic league appearances and goals as of 20 September 2026

Konstantinos Tanoulis (Greek: Κωνσταντίνος Τανούλης, born 7 March 2005) is a Greek professional footballer who currently plays for Super League 2 club Olympiacos B.

== Personal ==
His brother is basketball player Giorgos Tanoulis.
