= S.L. Benfica (youth) =

Portuguese association football team

Benfica Juniors
- Full name: Sport Lisboa e Benfica Juniors
- Nicknames: As Águias (The Eagles); Os Encarnados (The Reds)
- Ground: Benfica Campus
- Capacity: 2,644
- President: Rui Costa
- Head coach: Luís Araújo
- League: Campeonato Nacional de Juniores
- 2024–25: Champions
- Website: www.slbenfica.pt/pt-pt/futebol/formacao
Home colours	Away colours	Third colours

Sport Lisboa e Benfica "Juniors" (Portuguese: Juniores), commonly known as Benfica Juniors, is the under-19 football team comprised in the youth department of Portuguese club S.L. Benfica. They play their home matches at the Benfica Campus, the club's training ground and youth academy in Seixal.

Benfica's under-19s have won a record 26 Campeonato Nacional de Juniores, one Blue Stars/FIFA Youth Cup (1996), one UEFA Youth League (2021–22) and one Under-20 Intercontinental Cup (2022). Benfica hold UEFA Youth League records for the biggest win in a final, 6–0 against Red Bull Salzburg, most final appearances (4, joint-record with Chelsea) and most games played (70). They were distinguished for "Best implementation of the UEFA Youth League values" in 2013–14.

There are other development teams below under-19, completing Benfica's youth system: Juvenis "A" and "B"; Iniciados "A" and "B"; Infantis "A", "B", "C" and "D"; Benjamins "A" and "B"; and Traquinas "A". In 2015, Benfica received the Globe Soccer award for Best Academy of the year.

Benfica ranked first in a study analysing football academies, with 93 club-trained players active across 49 leagues. These players averaged 2,582 minutes played in official matches over the previous year, with an average club employment level of 0.81. FC Barcelona ranked second with 76 trained players (average club level of 0.87 and 2,773 minutes played), followed by CA River Plate in third place with 97 players (average club level of 0.81 and 2,305 minutes).

The top ten also included Sporting CP, Real Madrid, CA Boca Juniors, CA Vélez Sarsfield, AFC Ajax, Dinamo Zagreb, and Defensor Uruguay. In total, 30 countries were represented by at least one club in the top 100 rankings, with Argentina (15 clubs) and Brazil (11 clubs) being the most represented nations.

As of 2025:

Rank	Club
1	(Portugal) S.L. Benfica
2	(Spain) FC Barcelona
3	(Argentina) CA River Plate
4	(Netherlands) AFC Ajax
5	(Argentina) CA Boca Juniors
6	(Portugal) Sporting CP
7	(Croatia) Dinamo Zagreb
8	(Uruguay) Defensor SC
9	(Spain) Real Madrid CF
10	(Argentina) Vélez Sarsfield

== Players ==
=== Current players ===
As of 3 September 2023

Note: Flags indicate national team as defined under FIFA eligibility rules; some limited exceptions apply. Players may hold more than one non-FIFA nationality.

No.	Pos.	Nation	Player
—	GK	POR	André Moreira
—	GK	POR	Diogo Ferreira
—	GK	POR	João Fidalgo
—	GK	POR	André Gomes (B)
—	DF	POR	Guilherme Peixoto
—	DF	POR	Kevin Pinto
—	DF	POR	Diogo Rocha
—	DF	POR	Guilherme Gaspar
—	DF	POR	Rui Silva
—	DF	POR	Gonçalo Oliveira
—	DF	POR	Leandro Martins
—	DF	POR	João Pereira
—	DF	SLO	Žan Jevšenak (B)
—	DF	POR	Diogo Spencer (B)
—	DF	POR	João Tomé (B)
—	DF	POR	João Conceição (U23)
—	DF	POR	João Fonseca (U23)
—	DF	POR	Leandro Santos (U23)
—	DF	BRA	Tiago Coser (U23)
—	DF	POR	Vladimir Mendes (U23)
—	MF	POR	Martim Ferreira
—	MF	POR	Rodrigo Pires
—	MF	POR	André Gomes

No.	Pos.	Nation	Player
—	MF	POR	Tiago Pinto
—	MF	POR	Diogo Prioste (B)
—	MF	POR	Hugo Félix (B)
—	MF	POR	Nuno Félix (B)
—	MF	POR	Rafael Luís (B)
—	MF	AUS	Paul Okon-Engstler (U23)
—	MF	POR	João Veloso (U23)
—	FW	POR	Francisco Neto
—	FW	POR	Guilherme Afonso
—	FW	ISL	Stigur Thordarson
—	FW	POR	Olívio Tomé
—	FW	POR	Jair Monteiro
—	FW	BRA	Gustavo Ferreira
—	FW	BEL	Jelani Trevisan
—	FW	POR	João Rêgo (B)
—	FW	POR	Gustavo Varela (B)
—	FW	POR	José Marques (B)
—	FW	POR	Ricardo Nóbrega (U23)
—	FW	POR	Ivan Lima (U23)
—	FW	EST	Karel Mustmaa (U23)
—	FW	NED	Kyanno Silva (U23)
—	FW	POR	Rodrigo Rego (U23)

Key

B = current Benfica B player; U23 = player for Benfica's under-23 team

=== Notable players ===
Over 1,000 players have come through Benfica's youth ranks, but only a small part of them played for the club's first-team. The list below includes former youth players who represented the main team in a minimum of 25 matches, or those that reached 25 caps at full international level. In some occasions, graduates debuted for the first-team but left Benfica before reaching 25 matches and went on representing their national team at full international level. Those players are also listed. (Time periods below correspond to when players joined Benfica youth.)

Pre-1960

- (Portugal) Albino
- (Portugal) Santana
- (Portugal) Humberto Fernandes
- (Portugal) António Mendes
- (Portugal) Serra
- (Portugal) Fernando Cruz
- (Portugal) José Henrique
- (Portugal) Simões

1960s

- (Portugal) Diamantino Costa
- (Portugal) Vítor Martins
- (Portugal) Artur Correia
- (Portugal) Nené
- (Portugal) Humberto Coelho
- (Portugal) João Alves

1970s

- (Portugal) António Bastos Lopes
- (Portugal) Shéu
- (Portugal) Rui Jordão
- (Portugal) Eurico Gomes
- (Portugal) Cavungi
- (Portugal) Alberto Fonseca
- (Portugal) Fernando Chalana
- (Portugal) José Luís
- (Portugal) Jorge Silva
- (Portugal) Diamantino
- (Portugal) Rui Costa

1980s

- (Portugal) Samuel
- (Portugal) António Fonseca
- (Portugal) José Carlos
- (Portugal) Kenedy
- (Portugal) Paulo Sousa
- (Portugal) Paulo Madeira
- (Portugal) Rui Bento
- (Portugal) Bruno Basto
- (Portugal) Maniche

1990s

- (Portugal) Pedro Henriques
- (Portugal) Edgar
- (Portugal) Hugo Leal
- (Portugal) Bruno Aguiar
- (Portugal) José Sousa
- (Portugal) João Pereira
- (Portugal) Diogo Luís
- (Portugal) Sílvio
- (Portugal) Manuel Fernandes
- (Portugal) José Moreira

2000s

- (Portugal) Miguel Vítor
- (Portugal) Bernardo Silva
- (Portugal) Nélson Oliveira
- (Portugal) Gonçalo Guedes
- (Portugal) Bruno Varela
- (Portugal) Renato Sanches
- (Portugal) João Cancelo
- (Portugal) Jota
- (Portugal) Diogo Gonçalves
- (Portugal) Rúben Dias
- (Brazil) Ederson
- (Portugal) Gedson Fernandes

2010s

- (Portugal) Florentino
- (Portugal) André Gomes
- (Portugal) Ferro
- (Sweden) Victor Lindelöf
- (Portugal) Gonçalo Ramos
- (Portugal) João Félix
- (Portugal) Nuno Tavares

== Coaching staff ==
Position	Staff
Head coach	Luís Araújo
Assistant coaches	
Goalkeeping coach	
Observation coach	
Fitness coach	

Last updated: 6 July 2023

== Competitive record ==
=== UEFA Youth League and Under-20 FIFA Intercontinental Cup ===
As of match played 17 April 2026

Note: Benfica score is always listed first.

Season	Round	Opponent	Home	Away
2013–14	GS	(Belgium) Anderlecht	3–0	6–3
2013–14	GS	(France) Paris Saint-Germain	1–1	4–1
2013–14	GS	(Greece) Olympiacos	0–0	0–1
2013–14	R16	Austria Wien	4–1	—N/a
2013–14	QF	(England) Manchester City	—N/a	2–1
2013–14	SF	(Spain) Real Madrid	4–0	
2013–14	F	(Spain) Barcelona	0–3	
2014–15	GS	(Russia) Zenit Saint Petersburg	0–0	1–5
2014–15	GS	(Germany) Bayer Leverkusen	4–1	3–2
2014–15	GS	(France) Monaco	3–0	1–0
2014–15	R16	(England) Liverpool	2–1	—N/a
2014–15	QF	(Ukraine) Shakhtar Donetsk	1–1 (aet) (4–5 p)	—N/a
2015–16	GS	(Kazakhstan) Astana	8–0	5–0
2015–16	GS	(Spain) Atlético Madrid	1–1	2–1
2015–16	GS	(Turkey) Galatasaray	2–0	11–1
2015–16	R16	(Czech Republic) FK Příbram	—N/a	1–1 (aet) (5–4 p)
2015–16	QF	(Spain) Real Madrid	—N/a	0–2
2016–17	GS	(Turkey) Beşiktaş	0–0	3–0
2016–17	GS	(Italy) Napoli	2–0	3–2
2016–17	GS	(Ukraine) Dynamo Kyiv	1–2	1–2
2016–17	PO	(Denmark) Midtjylland	—N/a	1–1 (aet) (6–5 p)
2016–17	R16	(Netherlands) PSV Eindhoven	—N/a	1–1 (aet) (5–4 p)
2016–17	QF	(Russia) CSKA Moscow	—N/a	2–0
2016–17	SF	(Spain) Real Madrid	4–2	
2016–17	F	(Austria) Red Bull Salzburg	1–2	
2017–18	GS	(Russia) CSKA Moscow	5–1	0–2
2017–18	GS	(Switzerland) Basel	0–0	2–2
2017–18	GS	(England) Manchester United	2–2	1–1
2018–19	GS	(Germany) Bayern Munich	3–0	2–2
2018–19	GS	(Greece) AEK Athens	3–0	3–1
2018–19	GS	(Netherlands) Ajax	3–3	0–3
2018–19	PO	(France) Montpellier	—N/a	1–2
2019–20	GS	(Germany) RB Leipzig	2–1	3–0
2019–20	GS	(Russia) Zenit Saint Petersburg	1–0	7–1
2019–20	GS	(France) Lyon	1–2	3–2
2019–20	R16	(England) Liverpool	4–1	—N/a
2019–20	QF	(Croatia) Dinamo Zagreb	3–1	
2019–20	SF	(Netherlands) Ajax	3–0	
2019–20	F	(Spain) Real Madrid	2–3	
2020–21	Cancelled due to the COVID-19 pandemic in Europe			
2021–22	GS	(Ukraine) Dynamo Kyiv	1–0	0–4
2021–22	GS	(Spain) Barcelona	4–0	3–0
2021–22	GS	(Germany) Bayern Munich	4–0	2–0
2021–22	R16	(Denmark) Midtjylland	—N/a	3–2
2021–22	QF	(Portugal) Sporting CP	—N/a	4–0
2021–22	SF	(Italy) Juventus	2–2 (4–3 p)	
2021–22	F	(Austria) Red Bull Salzburg	6–0	
2022	F	(Uruguay) Peñarol	1–0	
2022–23	GS	(Israel) Maccabi Haifa	0–1	6–2
2022–23	GS	(Italy) Juventus	2–3	1–1
2022–23	GS	(France) Paris Saint-Germain	0–1	3–2
2023–24	GS	(Austria) Red Bull Salzburg	1–1	2–4
2023–24	GS	(Italy) Internazionale	1–1	1–1
2023–24	GS	(Spain) Real Sociedad	2–1	1–2
2024–25	LP	(Serbia) Crvena Zvezda	—N/a	2–1
2024–25	LP	(Spain) Atlético de Madrid	2–2	—N/a
2024–25	LP	(Netherlands) Feyenoord	2–0	—N/a
2024–25	LP	(Germany) Bayern Munich	—N/a	3–3
2024–25	LP	(France) Monaco	—N/a	0–1
2024–25	LP	(Italy) Bologna	3–0	—N/a
2024–25	R32	(Netherlands) AZ Alkmaar	—N/a	2–2 (3–4 p)
2025–26	LP	(Azerbaijan) Qarabağ FK	7–1	—N/a
2025–26	LP	(England) Chelsea	—N/a	2–5
2025–26	LP	(England) Newcastle	—N/a	5–1
2025–26	LP	(Germany) Bayer Leverkusen	5–0	—N/a
2025–26	LP	(Netherlands) Ajax	—N/a	4–0
2025–26	LP	(Italy) Napoli	3–0	—N/a
2025–26	R32	(Czech Republic) Slavia Praga	3–2	—N/a
2025–26	R16	(Netherlands) AZ Alkmaar	6–2	—N/a
2025–26	QF	(Italy) Internazionale	—N/a	3–2
2025–26	SF	(Belgium) Club Brugge KV	1–3	
2026–27	Champions PR2	(Cyprus) Pafos FC	6–0	3–1
2026–27	R32	(Croatia) Dinamo Zagreb		

=== Under-20 Blue Stars/FIFA Youth Cup ===
Note: Benfica score is always listed first.

Season	Round	Opponent	Match Result
1996	GS	(Switzerland) Grasshopper-Club	0–0
1996	GS	(Slovakia) Slovan Bratislava	0–0
1996	GS	(Switzerland) Bellinzona	2–0
1996	QF	(Switzerland) Basel	2–1
1996	SF	(Spain) FC Barcelona	0–0 (2–0 p)
1996	F	(Switzerland) Grasshopper-Club	0–0 (7–6 p)
1997	GS	(England) Manchester United	0–1
1997	GS	(Switzerland) FC Sion	1–0
1997	GS	(Switzerland) FC Blue Stars Zürich	1–0
1997	QF	(Hungary) Ferencvaros	1–0
1997	SF	(Switzerland) FC Sion	2–0
1997	F	(Switzerland) FC Basel	0–0 (2–3 p)
1998	GS	(Netherlands) PSV Eindhoven	0–0
1998	GS	(Mexico) C.D. Guadalajara	0–0
1998	GS	(Switzerland) FC Zürich	0–0
1998	QF	(Spain) Atlético Madrid	0–1
1998	SF - places 5-8	(Mexico) C.D. Guadalajara	0–0 (1–2 p)
1998	Seventh place match	(Denmark) Brøndby IF	0–0 (0–1 p)
2000	GS	(Switzerland) FC Luzern	2–0
2000	GS	(Germany) FC Bayern Munich	1–0
2000	QF	(Switzerland) Grasshopper-Club	2–0
2000	SF	(Spain) Valencia CF	0–1
2000	Match for places 3/4	(Germany) FC Bayern Munich	2–0
2001	GS	(Switzerland) FC St. Gallen	0–0
2001	GS	(England) Newcastle United	1–0
2001	QF	(Spain) Celta de Vigo	2–0
2001	SF	(Switzerland) Grasshopper-Club	0–2
2001	Match for places 3/4	(Czech Republic) Sparta Praha	1–0
2003	GS1	(Switzerland) FC Blue Stars Zürich	4–0
2003	GS1	(Bulgaria) Levski Sofia	0–1
2003	GS2	(Switzerland) FC Basel	2–1
2003	GS2	(Italy) AS Roma	0–1
2003	GS2	(Bulgaria) Levski Sofia	0–1
2003	Match for seventh place	(Switzerland) FC Zürich	1–2
2014	GS	(Switzerland) FC Zürich	1–0
2014	GS	(Ghana) Asante Kotoko	3–0
2014	GS	(Spain) Villarreal CF	3–0
2014	GS	(Switzerland) FC Blue Stars Zürich	1–0
2014	F	(Brazil) Athletico Paranaense	0–1
2015	GS	(Switzerland) FC Luzern	1–1
2015	GS	(Netherlands) Feyenoord Rotterdam	1–1
2015	GS	(Sweden) IFK Göteborg	4–0
2015	GS	(Switzerland) FC Blue Stars Zürich	3–1
2015	Match for Third Place	(Turkey) Bursaspor	2–1
2016	GS	(Switzerland) Grasshopper-Club	0–3
2016	GS	(Germany) FC St. Pauli	0–0
2016	GS	(Netherlands) Feyenoord Rotterdam	0–0
2016	GS	(Switzerland) FC Blue Stars Zürich	1–0
2016	Seventh Place Match	(Switzerland) FC Zürich	1–1 (5–4 p)
2017	GS	(Belgium) RSC Anderlecht	0–1
2017	GS	(Switzerland) FC Zürich	0–1
2017	GS	(Germany) 1. FSV Mainz 05	3–2
2017	GS	(Switzerland) FC St.Gallen	2–0
2017	Fifth Place Match	(England) West Ham United	1–3
2019	GS	(Greece) PAOK FC	0–1
2019	GS	(Switzerland) FC Zürich	1–0
2019	GS	(Switzerland) FC Basel	1–0
2019	GS	(United States) Seattle Sounders	1–0
2019	F	(Argentina) Boca Juniors	0–2
2022	GS	(Switzerland) FC Zürich	0–0
2022	GS	(Germany) FSV Mainz	0–1
2022	GS	(Switzerland) FC Blue Stars Zürich	6–0
2022	Fifth Place Match	(Spain) Valencia CF	0–1

=== Otten Innovation Cup (Under-19) ===
As of 2025

Note: Benfica score is always listed first.

Season	Round	Opponent	Match Result
Otten Innovation Cup - 2013 (Special 100 years anniversary)	GS	(Northern Ireland) Glenavon F.C.	8–0
Otten Innovation Cup - 2013 (Special 100 years anniversary)	GS	(Poland) Widzew Łódź	12–0
Otten Innovation Cup - 2013 (Special 100 years anniversary)	GS	(Germany) Eintracht Braunschweig	3–1
Otten Innovation Cup - 2013 (Special 100 years anniversary)	GS	(Netherlands) PSV Eindhoven	2–1
Otten Innovation Cup - 2013 (Special 100 years anniversary)	GS	(Spain) Real Madrid	2–4
Otten Innovation Cup - 2013 (Special 100 years anniversary)	3PM	(France) SC Bastia	1–1 (3–5 p)
Otten Innovation Cup - 2024	GS	(England) Manchester United FC	1–0
Otten Innovation Cup - 2024	GS	(Denmark) FC Kobenhavn	0–1
Otten Innovation Cup - 2024	GS	(South Korea) Jeonbuk Motors	3–0
Otten Innovation Cup - 2024	SF	(Netherlands) PSV Eindhoven	0–1
Otten Innovation Cup - 2024	3PM	(Brazil) RB Bragantino	1–5
Otten Innovation Cup - 2025	GS	(Netherlands) PSV Eindhoven	1–3
Otten Innovation Cup - 2025	GS	(Belgium) Club Brugge KV	1–1
Otten Innovation Cup - 2025	GS	(Germany) RB Leipzig	3–1
Otten Innovation Cup - 2025	5-8PM	(South Korea) Jeonbuk Motors	4–1
Otten Innovation Cup - 2025	5PM	(Germany) RB Leipzig	1–1 (7–6 p)
Otten Innovation Cup - 2026	GS	(England) Chelsea FC	2–3
Otten Innovation Cup - 2026	GS	(Belgium) Club Brugge KV	0–1
Otten Innovation Cup - 2026	GS	(France) AS Monaco	2–1
Otten Innovation Cup - 2026	5-8PM	(Australia) Adelaide United FC	4–0
Otten Innovation Cup - 2026	5PM	(England) Manchester United FC	5–1

=== Geneva Cup (Under-17) ===
As of 2025

Note: Benfica score is always listed first.

Season	Round	Opponent	Match Result
Geneva Cup 2015	GS	(Italy) AC Milan	1–0
Geneva Cup 2015	GS	(Switzerland) FC Basel	1–1
Geneva Cup 2015	GS	(Switzerland) FC Meyrin	1–1
Geneva Cup 2015	SF	(England) Arsenal FC	2–1
Geneva Cup 2015	F	(Spain) Atlético Madrid	0–1
Geneva Cup 2017	GS	(Spain) Atlético Madrid	0–1
Geneva Cup 2017	GS	(Switzerland) FC Meyrin	1–2
Geneva Cup 2017	GS	(Switzerland) Grasshopper-Club	2–2
Geneva Cup 2017	SF places 5-8	(Belgium) KRC Genk	4–0
Geneva Cup 2017	Fifth Place Match	(Switzerland) Grasshopper-Club	1–1 (4–3 p)
Geneva Cup 2019	GS	(Japan) Cerezo Osaka	1–0
Geneva Cup 2019	GS	(Italy) Sampdoria	0–0
Geneva Cup 2019	GS	(Switzerland) FC Meyrin	3–0
Geneva Cup 2019	SF	(Switzerland) Servette FC	3–0
Geneva Cup 2019	F	(Italy) Parma	4–0
Geneva Cup 2022	GS	(Switzerland) Young Boys	1–1
Geneva Cup 2022	GS	(Italy) AC Monza	2–1
Geneva Cup 2022	GS	(Switzerland) FC Meyrin	4–0
Geneva Cup 2022	SF	(Italy) Juventus FC	1–1 (4–3 p)
Geneva Cup 2022	F	(Brazil) Fluminense	1–4
Geneva Cup 2025	GS	(England) Everton FC	2–2
Geneva Cup 2025	GS	(Switzerland) FC Meyrin	3–1
Geneva Cup 2025	GS	(Switzerland) FC Basel	2–2
Geneva Cup 2025	SF	(Italy) Internazionale	1–0
Geneva Cup 2025	F	(England) Everton FC	1–2

=== Youngster Cup - Berlin (Under-17) ===
As of 2025

Note: Benfica score is always listed first.

Season	Round	Opponent	Match Result
Youngster Cup 2022	GS	(Germany) Hertha BSC	2–3
Youngster Cup 2022	GS	(Germany) FC Bayern Munich	2–1
Youngster Cup 2022	GS for 5th, 6th and 7th places	(Germany) FC Bayern Munich	1–0
Youngster Cup 2022	GS for 5th, 6th and 7th places	(Germany) 1. FC Union Berlin	1–0
Youngster Cup 2023	GS	(Turkey) Galatasaray	2–1
Youngster Cup 2023	GS	(Germany) Borussia Monchengladbach	0–1
Youngster Cup 2023	GS for 5th, 6th and 7th places	(Switzerland) FC Basel	3–1
Youngster Cup 2023	GS for 5th, 6th and 7th places	(Turkey) Galatasaray	2–1
Youngster Cup 2024	GS	(Germany) 1. FC Union Berlin	1–0
Youngster Cup 2024	GS	(Brazil) Flamengo	3–0
Youngster Cup 2024	GS	(Switzerland) FC Basel	3–1
Youngster Cup 2024	SF	(Spain) Real Sociedad	4–1
Youngster Cup 2024	F	(Brazil) Flamengo	4–1
Youngster Cup 2025	GS	(Germany) Borussia Dortmund	2–1
Youngster Cup 2025	GS	(France) Paris Saint-Germain	0–2
Youngster Cup 2025	GS	(Denmark) FC Kobenhavn	1–1
Youngster Cup 2025	SF	(Germany) Eintracht Frankfurt	1–1 (3–4 p)
Youngster Cup 2025	3P	(Denmark) FC Kobenhavn	1–0
Youngster Cup 2026	GS	(Italy) Juventus FC	1–1
Youngster Cup 2026	GS	(Switzerland) FC Basel	2–0
Youngster Cup 2026	GS	(Germany) Eintracht Frankfurt	1–0
Youngster Cup 2026	SF	(Denmark) FC Kobenhavn	1–0
Youngster Cup 2026	F	(Germany) Eintracht Frankfurt	3–2

=== Shanghai Future Star Cup (Under-17) ===
As of 2025

Note: Benfica score is always listed first.

Season	Round	Opponent	Match Result
Shanghai Future Star Cup 2025	GS	(Germany) RB Leipzig	4–1
Shanghai Future Star Cup 2025	GS	(China) Shanghai FA	1–0
Shanghai Future Star Cup 2025	GS	(England) Manchester City	2–0
Shanghai Future Star Cup 2025	SF	(England) Chelsea FC	2–1
Shanghai Future Star Cup 2025	F	(Brazil) Fluminense	0–2

=== Messi Cup (Under-16) ===
As of 2026

Note: Benfica score is always listed first.

Season	Round	Opponent	Match Result
Messi Cup 2026	GS	(Spain) Atlético Madrid	0–2
Messi Cup 2026	GS	(Ecuador) Independiente del Valle	4–2
Messi Cup 2026	GS	(United States) Inter Miami CF	3–0
Messi Cup 2026	QF	(Brazil) Palmeiras	3–6
Messi Cup 2026	SF-4th/8th	(Argentina) Boca Juniors	1–4
Messi Cup 2026	F-7th/8th	(Spain) FC Barcelona	Cancelled due to bad weather

== Honours ==
- Portuguese Championship
  - Winners (26) – record: 1943–44, 1944–45, 1948–49, 1950–51, 1954–55, 1956–57, 1957–58, 1958–59, 1959–60, 1961–62, 1962–63, 1967–68, 1969–70, 1971–72, 1974–75, 1975–76, 1977–78, 1984–85, 1987–88, 1988–89, 1999–00, 2003–04, 2012–13, 2017–18, 2021–22, 2024–25
- UEFA Youth League
  - Winners (1): 2021–22
  - Runners-up (3): 2013-14, 2016–17, 2019–20
- Under-20 Intercontinental Cup
  - Winners (1): 2022
- Blue Stars/FIFA Youth Cup
  - Winners (1): 1996
  - Runners-up (3): 1997, 2014, 2019

== Other youth honours ==
Juvenis (under-17)

- Portuguese Championship

Winners (22) – record: 1963–64, 1967–68, 1968–69, 1973–74, 1974–75, 1982–83, 1989–90, 1990–91, 1991–92, 1992–93, 1995–96, 1996–97, 2000–01, 2007–08, 2010–11, 2012–13, 2014–15, 2017–18, 2018–19, 2022–23, 2023–24, 2024–25

Iniciados (under-15)

- Portuguese Championship

Winners (13): 1978–79, 1981–82, 1984–85, 1988–89, 2008–09, 2009–10, 2011–12, 2013–14, 2015–16, 2016–17, 2022–23, 2023–24, 2024–25

Infantis (under-13)

- Portuguese Championship

Winners (3) – shared record: 1988–89, 1989–90, 1995–96
