= Academia Cristiano Ronaldo =

Facilities outside Alcochete, Portugal

- Interactive map of Academia Cristiano Ronaldo
- Location: Alcochete, Portugal
- Coordinates: 38°43′49″N 8°51′0″W
- Owner: Sporting CP
- Type: Sports facility

Construction
- Opened: 2002

Website
- sporting.pt

The Academia Cristiano Ronaldo (English: Cristiano Ronaldo Academy), formerly known as Academia Sporting (English: Sporting Academy) and also known as Academia de Alcochete (English: Alcochete Academy), is the name given to the football training facilities of Sporting CP, located outside Alcochete, in the Setúbal District of Portugal. It includes the Sporting CP Youth Academy, which helped to develop footballers such as Luis Figo and Cristiano Ronaldo from a young age. Both Sporting CP B, the reserve men's football team of Sporting CP's main squad, and the main Sporting CP women's football team, play their home matches at the Estádio Aurélio Pereira (named after long-serving Sporting CP's head youth player scout Aurélio Pereira) in the Academia Cristiano Ronaldo, which holds a seating capacity of 1,180.

== History ==
The Sporting Academy, inaugurated in 2002 and since 2020 officially known as Cristiano Ronaldo Academy, was built on the opposite bank of the Tagus River from Lisbon as a brand new infrastructure of Sporting CP's football training facilities, including those belonging to its youth development system.

The academy was one of the training grounds for the Portugal national football team during the UEFA Euro 2004. The academy, by then known as the Academia de Alcochete, was renamed as the Sporting/Puma Academy (Academia Sporting/Puma) to reflect the sponsorship and naming contract signed by the club and the sports brand Puma in 2006; the contract lasted until 2012.

The Sporting Academy was the first sports academy in Europe to receive the ISO9001:2008. – a quality certification awarded by EIC, a Portuguese anonymous society responsible for this type of quality management system certification.

In June 2010, Sporting CP signed the first contract for consultancy in sports training at the international level, with Al-Ahli Saudi Soccer Academy in Saudi Arabia, a partnership that lasted for three years.

On 15 May 2018, after Sporting finished third in the Portuguese league, several players and coaches were attacked by around fifty fanatic supporters of Sporting's ultras at the academy. Those ultras would be later banned for life from the club and prosecuted by the legal authorities.

On 21 September 2020, the academy was renamed Academia Cristiano Ronaldo after Cristiano Ronaldo, the most decorated football player ever to emerge from Sporting CP's youth development system.
