= FC Porto (youth) =

Porto Juniors
- Full name: Futebol Clube do Porto Juniors
- Short name: Porto Juniors
- Ground: Estádio Municipal Jorge Sampaio
- Capacity: 8,272
- President: André Villas-Boas
- Manager: Sérgio Ferreira
- League: Campeonato Nacional de Juniores
- 2025–26: 1st
- Website: fcporto.pt
Home colours	Away colours	Third colours

Futebol Clube do Porto "Juniors" (Portuguese: Juniores), commonly known as Porto Juniors, is the under-19 football team comprised in the youth department of Portuguese club FC Porto. They play their home matches at the Estádio Municipal Jorge Sampaio in Pedroso, Vila Nova de Gaia.

Domestically, Porto have won 24 Campeonato Nacional de Juniores titles. Internationally, they won the Blue Stars/FIFA Youth Cup in 2011 and the UEFA Youth League in 2019. In the latter, they became the first Portuguese club to conquer the competition and were also distinguished with the "UEFA's Best Educational Action" award.

Between the department's several development teams, two other youth categories complete the three main age groups, the Juvenis (under-17) and the Iniciados (under-15), who compete in their respective national leagues organised by the Portuguese Football Federation.

== Players ==
=== Current squad ===
As of 17 September 2024

Note: Flags indicate national team as defined under FIFA eligibility rules; some limited exceptions apply. Players may hold more than one non-FIFA nationality.

No.	Pos.	Nation	Player
—	GK	POR	Denis Gutu
—	GK	POR	Francisco Barroso
—	GK	POR	Gonçalo Silva
—	GK	POR	Martim Pereira
—	DF	POR	Duarte Nogueira
—	DF	POR	Fábio Amaral
—	DF	POR	Gonçalo Paiva
—	DF	POR	Ivandro Silva
—	DF	POR	José Domingues
—	DF	GBS	Mamadu Queta
—	DF	POR	Martim Chelmik
—	DF	POR	Miguel Rocha
—	DF	POR	Pedro Davide
—	DF	POR	Rodrigo Pinto
—	DF	POR	Tomé Almeida
—	DF	POR	Vasco Santos
—	MF	POR	Amadu Camará

No.	Pos.	Nation	Player
—	MF	POR	Bernardo Lima
—	MF	POR	Gonçalo Pinto
—	MF	POR	João Abreu
—	MF	POR	Manuel Miranda
—	MF	POR	Rodrigo Gonçalves
—	MF	POR	Tiago Silva
—	MF	POR	Tomás Peixoto
—	FW	POR	André Miranda
—	FW	POR	Francisco Curvelo
—	FW	POR	João Pedra
—	FW	POR	Léo Fajardo
—	FW	POR	Leonardo Santos
—	FW	POR	Mateus Mide
—	FW	POR	Miguel Silva
—	FW	POR	Rodrigo Silva
—	FW	GBS	Umaro Buaró
—	FW	POR	Vasco Sousa

== Staff ==
Position	Staff
Head coach	(Portugal) Sérgio Ferreira
Assistant coaches	(Portugal) Luís Magalhães (Portugal) Pedro Brito (Portugal) Silvestre Varela (Portugal) Vítor Moreira
Goalkeeper coach	(Portugal) Leonardo Tavares
Physiologists and fitness coaches	(Portugal) João Magalhães (Portugal) Pedro Abreu
Analysts	(Portugal) João Santos (Portugal) Paulo Pinto
Club doctor	(Portugal) Filipe Puga
Physiotherapist	(Portugal) Tiago Graça

Last updated: 17 September 2024
Source: FC Porto

== Competitive record ==
=== UEFA Youth League ===
As of match played 19 April 2024

Note: Porto score is always listed first.

Season	Round	Opponent	Home	Away
2013–14	GS	Austria Wien	0–0	0–3
2013–14	GS	(Spain) Atlético Madrid	3–1	2–3
2013–14	GS	(Russia) Zenit Saint Petersburg	2–2	2–1
2014–15	GS	(Belarus) BATE Borisov	2–0	0–0
2014–15	GS	(Ukraine) Shakhtar Donetsk	1–1	1–1
2014–15	GS	(Spain) Athletic Bilbao	2–0	1–3
2014–15	R16	(Spain) Real Madrid	—N/a	1–1 (aet) (3–1 p)
2014–15	QF	(Belgium) Anderlecht	—N/a	0–5
2015–16	GS	(Ukraine) Dynamo Kyiv	0–1	1–2
2015–16	GS	(England) Chelsea	3–3	0–0
2015–16	GS	(Israel) Maccabi Tel Aviv	2–0	2–1
2016–17	GS	(Denmark) Copenhagen	4–1	1–3
2016–17	GS	(England) Leicester City	2–1	2–0
2016–17	GS	(Belgium) Club Brugge	1–3	2–0
2016–17	R16	(Romania) Viitorul Constanța	3–0	—N/a
2016–17	QF	(Spain) Barcelona	—N/a	1–2
2017–18	GS	(Turkey) Beşiktaş	5–1	1–0
2017–18	GS	(France) Monaco	2–1	2–3
2017–18	GS	(Germany) RB Leipzig	3–2	2–0
2017–18	R16	(Austria) Red Bull Salzburg	3–1	—N/a
2017–18	QF	(England) Tottenham Hotspur	—N/a	2–0
2017–18	SF	(England) Chelsea	2–2 (aet) (4–5 p)	
2018–19	GS	(Germany) Schalke 04	3–0	3–0
2018–19	GS	(Turkey) Galatasaray	2–2	2–0
2018–19	GS	(Russia) Lokomotiv Moscow	2–1	1–2
2018–19	R16	(England) Tottenham Hotspur	2–0	—N/a
2018–19	QF	(Denmark) Midtjylland	3–0	—N/a
2018–19	SF	(Germany) 1899 Hoffenheim	3–0	
2018–19	F	(England) Chelsea	3–1	
2019–20	R1	(Latvia) Liepāja	4–2	3–0
2019–20	R2	(Slovenia) Domžale	2–2	3–0
2019–20	PO	(Austria) Red Bull Salzburg	1–1 (aet) (6–7 p)	—N/a
2020–21	Cancelled due to the COVID-19 pandemic in Europe			
2021–22	GS	(Spain) Atlético Madrid	1–2	2–1
2021–22	GS	(England) Liverpool	1–1	0–4
2021–22	GS	(Italy) Milan	3–1	1–0
2022–23	GS	(Spain) Atlético Madrid	1–2	0–1
2022–23	GS	(Belgium) Club Brugge	2–1	2–1
2022–23	GS	(Germany) Bayer 04 Leverkusen	3–1	3–1
2022–23	PO	(Greece) Panathinaikos	—N/a	1–0
2022–23	R16	(England) Liverpool	—N/a	1–1 (aet) (5–6 p)
2023–24	GS	(Ukraine) Shakhtar Donetsk	2–0	4–1
2023–24	GS	(Spain) Barcelona	0–2	4–0
2023–24	GS	(Belgium) Antwerp	3–1	4–1
2023–24	R16	(Netherlands) AZ Alkmaar	—N/a	1–1 (aet) (4–3 p)
2023–24	QF	(Germany) Mainz 05	—N/a	4–1
2023–24	SF	(Italy) Milan	2–2 (aet) (3–4 p)	
2025–26	R2	(Slovenia) NK Bravo	4–0	4–1
2025–26	R3	(Spain) Real Betis	0–4	0–5
2026–27	LP	(England) Manchester City	3–1	—N/a
2026–27	LP	(Spain) Real Betis	—N/a	0–5
2026–27	LP	(Netherlands) PSV Eindhoven		—N/a
2026–27	LP	(Italy) Napoli		—N/a
2026–27	LP	(Netherlands) Feyenoord	—N/a	
2026–27	LP	(England) Liverpool FC	—N/a	

== Honours ==
- Portuguese Championship

Winners (24): 1952–53, 1963–64, 1965–66, 1968–69, 1970–71, 1972–73, 1978–79, 1979–80, 1980–81, 1981–82, 1983–84, 1985–86, 1986–87, 1989–90, 1992–93, 1993–94, 1997–98, 2000–01, 2006–07, 2010–11, 2014–15, 2015–16, 2018–19, 2025–26

- UEFA Youth League

Winners (1): 2018–19

- Blue Stars/FIFA Youth Cup

Winners (1): 2011

== Other youth honours ==
Juvenis (under-17)

- Portuguese Championship

Winners (21): 1965–66, 1969–70, 1970–71, 1971–72, 1972–73, 1976–77, 1978–79, 1979–80, 1981–82, 1984–85, 1985–86, 1987–88, 1988–89, 1994–95, 1997–98, 2001–02, 2002–03, 2008–09, 2009–10, 2011–12, 2025–26

Iniciados (under-15)

- Portuguese Championship

Winners (15): 1974–75, 1976–77, 1977–78, 1979–80, 1980–81, 1985–86, 1989–90, 1996–97, 1997–98, 1999–00, 2001–02, 2004–05, 2006–07, 2010–11, 2025–26

Infantis (under-13)

- Portuguese Championship

Winners (2): 1987–88, 1992–93

== See also ==
- FC Porto B
