= Campeonato Nacional de Infantis =

Football competition in Portugal

- Founded: 1987
- Folded: 1997
- Country: Portugal
- Confederation: UEFA
- Level on pyramid: 1
- Most championships: Benfica & Sporting CP (3 titles each)

The Campeonato Nacional de Infantis is a defunct Portuguese competition for teams made up of players under 13 years old. It was played between 1987 and 1997. Today only regional tournaments exist for this age group.

== Winners ==
Season	Champions
1987–88	Porto
1988–89	Benfica
1989–90	Benfica (2)
1990–91	Boavista
1991–92	Sporting CP
1992–93	Porto (2)
1993–94	Boavista (2)
1994–95	Sporting CP (2)
1995–96	Benfica (3)
1996–97	Sporting CP (3)

== Performance by club ==
Club	Winners	Seasons
Benfica	3	1988–89, 1989–90, 1995–96
Sporting CP	3	1991–92, 1994–95, 1996–97
Porto	2	1987–88, 1992–93
Boavista	2	1990–91, 1993–94
