= 2020–21 UEFA Youth League =

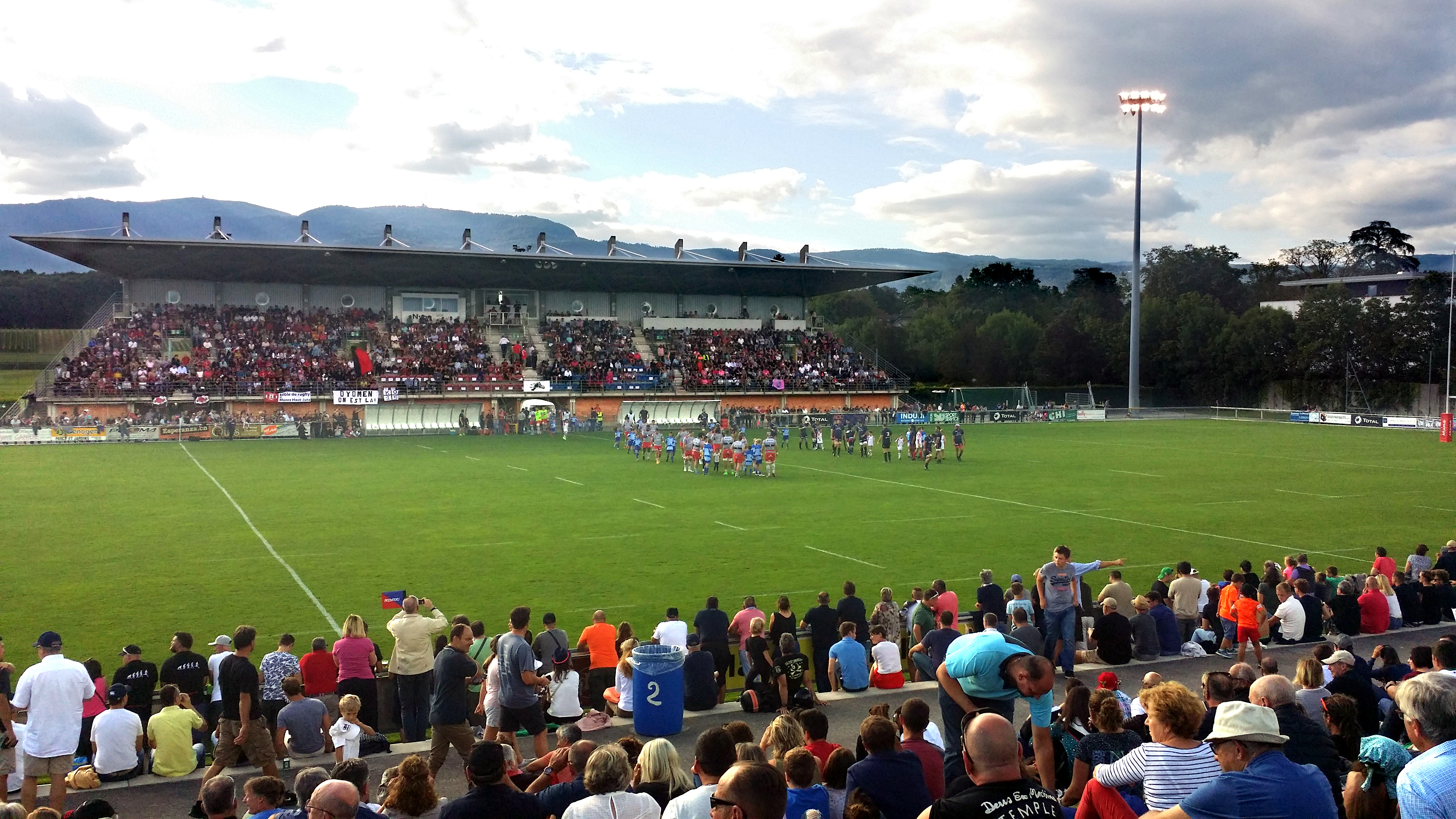
- The Colovray Stadium in Nyon was scheduled to host the final.

Tournament details
- Dates: Cancelled (2 March – 20 May 2021)
- Teams: 64 (from 36 associations)

The 2020–21 UEFA Youth League was scheduled to be the eighth season of the UEFA Youth League, a European youth club football competition organised by UEFA.

As in previous years, the final tournament, consisting of the semi-finals and final, would originally have been played at the Colovray Stadium in Nyon, Switzerland; however, due to the continuing COVID-19 pandemic in Europe, the format of the competition was changed to a straight knockout tournament starting from 2 March 2021. On 17 February 2021, the UEFA Executive Committee cancelled the tournament.

== Teams ==
A total of 64 teams from at least 32 of the 55 UEFA member associations could enter the 2020–21 UEFA Youth League. They were split into two sections, each with 32 teams:

- UEFA Champions League Path: The youth teams of the 32 clubs which qualified for the 2020–21 UEFA Champions League group stage entered the UEFA Champions League Path. If there was a vacancy (youth teams not entering), it was filled by a team defined by UEFA.
- Domestic Champions Path: The youth domestic champions (U17, U18 or U19) of the top 32 associations according to their 2019 UEFA country coefficients entered the Domestic Champions Path. If there was a vacancy (associations with no youth domestic competition, as well as youth domestic champions already included in the UEFA Champions League path), it was first filled by the title holders should they had not yet qualified, and then by the youth domestic champions of the next association in the UEFA ranking.

In early April 2020, UEFA announced that due to the COVID-19 pandemic, the deadline for entering the tournament had been postponed until further notice.

All Domestic Champions Path teams in italics were declared champions or selected to play by the national association following an abandoned season due to the COVID-19 pandemic in Europe, and were subject to approval by UEFA as per the guidelines for entry to European competitions in response to the COVID-19 pandemic.

The list of participants, from 36 associations, was published by UEFA on 7 December 2020. Celta Vigo, Lazio, 1. FC Köln, Angers, Chertanovo Moscow, İstanbul Başakşehir, AZ, Odense, Dinamo Minsk, Górnik Zabrze, Olimpija Ljubljana, Ferencváros, Győri ETO, Apolonia and Waterford would have made their tournament debuts.

Qualified teams for 2020–21 UEFA Youth League
Rank	Association	Teams	
Rank	Association	UEFA Champions League Path	Domestic Champions Path
1	Spain	Real Madrid; Barcelona; Atlético Madrid; Sevilla	Celta Vigo (2019–20 División de Honor Juvenil U19)
2	England	Liverpool; Manchester City (2019–20 U18 Premier League); Manchester United; Chelsea	
3	Italy	Juventus; Inter Milan; Atalanta (2019–20 U19 Campionato Primavera 1); Lazio	
4	Germany	Bayern Munich; Borussia Dortmund; RB Leipzig; Borussia Mönchengladbach	1. FC Köln (2019–20 U19 A-Junioren-Bundesliga)
5	France	Paris Saint-Germain; Marseille; Rennes	Angers (2019–20 Championnat National U19)
6	Russia	Zenit Saint Petersburg; Lokomotiv Moscow; Krasnodar	Chertanovo Moscow (2019–20 Russian Youth Football League U17)
7	Portugal	Porto	Benfica (2019–20 Campeonato Nacional Juniores S19)
8	Belgium	Club Brugge	Genk (2019–20 Belgian U18 League)
9	Ukraine	Shakhtar Donetsk; Dynamo Kyiv (2019–20 Ukrainian U19 League)	
10	Turkey	İstanbul Başakşehir	Galatasaray (2019–20 U19 Elit)
11	Netherlands	Ajax	AZ (2019–20 Eredivisie U19)
12	Austria	Red Bull Salzburg (2019–20 Jugendliga U18)	
13	Czech Republic		Sparta Prague (2019–20 Czech U19 League)
14	Greece	Olympiacos	PAOK (2019–20 Superleague K19)
15	Croatia		Dinamo Zagreb (2019–20 1. HNL Juniori U19)
16	Denmark	Midtjylland	Odense (2019–20 U19 Ligaen)
17	Switzerland		Basel (2019–20 Swiss U18 League)
18	Cyprus		APOEL (2019–20 Cypriot U19 League)
19	Serbia		Red Star Belgrade (2019–20 Serbian U19 League)
20	Scotland		Rangers (2019–20 Scottish U18 League)
21	Belarus		Dinamo Minsk (2019–20 Belarusian U18 League)
22	Sweden		Hammarby IF (2019 P17 Allsvenskan)
23	Norway		Rosenborg (2019 Norwegian U19 Cup)
24	Kazakhstan		Kairat (2019 Kazakhstani U17 League)
25	Poland		Górnik Zabrze (2019–20 Polish U18 Central Junior League)
26	Azerbaijan		Gabala (2019–20 Azerbaijani U19 League)
27	Israel		Maccabi Haifa (2019–20 Israeli U19 Noar Premier League)
28	Bulgaria		Ludogorets Razgrad (2019–20 U18 BFU Cup)
29	Romania		Viitorul Constanța (2019–20 Liga Elitelor U19)
30	Slovakia		Žilina (2019–20 Slovak U19 League)
31	Slovenia		Olimpija Ljubljana (2019–20 Slovenian U19 League)
33	Hungary	Ferencváros	Győri ETO (2019–20 Hungarian U19 League)
34	North Macedonia		Shkëndija (2019–20 Macedonian U19 League)
35	Moldova		Sheriff Tiraspol (2019–20 Divizia Națională U19)
36	Albania		Apolonia (2019–20 Albanian U19 League)
37	Republic of Ireland		Waterford (2019 League of Ireland U19 Division)

Associations without any participating teams (no teams qualify for UEFA Champions League group stage, and either with no youth domestic competition or not ranked high enough for a vacancy)

Rank	Association
32	Liechtenstein
38	Finland
39	Iceland
40	Bosnia and Herzegovina
41	Lithuania
42	Latvia
43	Luxembourg

Rank	Association
44	Armenia
45	Malta
46	Estonia
47	Georgia
48	Wales
49	Montenegro

Rank	Association
50	Faroe Islands
51	Gibraltar
52	Northern Ireland
53	Kosovo
54	Andorra
55	San Marino

Notes

1. ^{TH} Title holders.
2. ^{YC} Teams playing in the UEFA Champions League Path which were also youth domestic champions.
3. ^{PO} Teams playing in the UEFA Champions League Path after their senior team qualified for the Champions League group stage via play-offs.
4. ^{V-LIE} Team playing in the Domestic Champions Path through the vacancy of Liechtenstein (no youth domestic competition).
5. ^{V-YC} Teams playing in the Domestic Champions Path through the vacancies of teams which qualified for the Champions League group stage automatically.
6. ^{V-PO} Teams playing in the Domestic Champions Path through the vacancies of teams which qualified for the Champions League group stage via play-offs.
7. Austria (AUT): The 2019–20 Jugendliga U18 was abandoned due to the COVID-19 pandemic in Austria. The top team of the league at the time of the abandonment, Red Bull Salzburg, had already qualified for the UEFA Champions League Path via play-offs, so no team was selected to play in the 2020–21 UEFA Youth League by the Austrian Football Association in the Domestic Champions Path.
8. Azerbaijan (AZE): The 2019–20 Azerbaijani U19 League was abandoned due to the COVID-19 pandemic in Azerbaijan. The top team of the league at the time of the abandonment, Gabala (who were declared champions), were selected to play in the 2020–21 UEFA Youth League by the Association of Football Federations of Azerbaijan in the Domestic Champions Path.
9. Belgium (BEL): The 2019–20 Belgian U18 League was abandoned due to the COVID-19 pandemic in Belgium. The top team of the league at the time of the abandonment, Genk (who were declared champions), were selected to play in the 2020–21 UEFA Youth League by the Royal Belgian Football Association in the Domestic Champions Path.
10. Croatia (CRO): The 2019–20 1. HNL Juniori U19 was abandoned due to the COVID-19 pandemic in Croatia. The top team of the league at the time of the abandonment based on the average number of points per matches played for each team, Dinamo Zagreb, were selected to play in the 2020–21 UEFA Youth League by the Croatian Football Federation in the Domestic Champions Path.
11. Cyprus (CYP): The 2019–20 Cypriot U19 League was abandoned due to the COVID-19 pandemic in Cyprus. The top team of the league at the time of the abandonment, APOEL, were selected to play in the 2020–21 UEFA Youth League by the Cyprus Football Association in the Domestic Champions Path.
12. Czech Republic (CZE): The 2019–20 Czech U19 League was abandoned due to the COVID-19 pandemic in the Czech Republic. The top team of the league at the time of the abandonment, Sparta Prague (who were declared champions), were selected to play in the 2020–21 UEFA Youth League by the Football Association of the Czech Republic in the Domestic Champions Path.
13. England (ENG): The 2019–20 U18 Premier League was abandoned due to the COVID-19 pandemic in England. The top team of the league at the time of the abandonment based on the average number of points per matches played for each team, Manchester City (who were declared champions), had already qualified for the UEFA Champions League Path, so no team was selected to play in the 2020–21 UEFA Youth League by the Football Association in the Domestic Champions Path.
14. France (FRA): The 2019–20 Championnat National U19 was abandoned due to the COVID-19 pandemic in France. The top team of the league at the time of the abandonment based on the average number of points per matches played for each team, Angers, were selected to play in the 2020–21 UEFA Youth League by the French Football Federation in the Domestic Champions Path.
15. Germany (GER): The 2019–20 U19 A-Junioren-Bundesliga was abandoned due to the COVID-19 pandemic in Germany. The winner of a draw among the top teams of the three divisions at the time of the abandonment, 1. FC Köln, were selected to play in the 2020–21 UEFA Youth League by the German Football Association in the Domestic Champions Path.
16. Greece (GRE): The 2019–20 Superleague K19 was abandoned due to the COVID-19 pandemic in Greece. The top team of the league at the time of the abandonment, PAOK (who were already assured of the title by then and were declared champions), were selected to play in the 2020–21 UEFA Youth League by the Hellenic Football Federation in the Domestic Champions Path.
17. Hungary (HUN): The 2019–20 Hungarian U19 League was abandoned due to the COVID-19 pandemic in Hungary. The top team of the league at the time of the abandonment, Győri ETO, were selected to play in the 2020–21 UEFA Youth League by the Hungarian Football Federation in the Domestic Champions Path.
18. Israel (ISR): The 2019–20 Israeli Noar Premier League was abandoned due to the COVID-19 pandemic in Israel. The top team of the league at the time of the abandonment, Maccabi Haifa (who were declared champions), were selected to play in the 2020–21 UEFA Youth League by the Israel Football Association in the Domestic Champions Path.
19. Italy (ITA): The 2019–20 U19 Campionato Primavera 1 was abandoned due to the COVID-19 pandemic in Italy. The top team of the league at the time of the abandonment, Atalanta (who were declared champions), had already qualified for the UEFA Champions League Path, so no team was selected to play in the 2020–21 UEFA Youth League by the Italian Football Federation in the Domestic Champions Path.
20. Moldova (MDA): The 2019–20 Divizia Națională U19 was abandoned due to the COVID-19 pandemic in Moldova. The top team of the league at the time of the abandonment, Sheriff Tiraspol (who were declared champions), were selected to play in the 2020–21 UEFA Youth League by the Moldovan Football Federation in the Domestic Champions Path.
21. Netherlands (NED): The 2019–20 Eredivisie U19 was abandoned due to the COVID-19 pandemic in the Netherlands. The top team of the league at the time of the abandonment, AZ, were selected to play in the 2020–21 UEFA Youth League by the Royal Dutch Football Association in the Domestic Champions Path.
22. North Macedonia (MKD): The 2019–20 Macedonian U19 League was abandoned due to the COVID-19 pandemic in North Macedonia. The top team of the league at the time of the abandonment, Shkëndija, were selected to play in the 2020–21 UEFA Youth League by the Football Federation of North Macedonia in the Domestic Champions Path.
23. Poland (POL): The 2019–20 Polish U18 Central Junior League was abandoned due to the COVID-19 pandemic in Poland. The top team of the league at the time of the abandonment, Górnik Zabrze (who were declared champions), were selected to play in the 2020–21 UEFA Youth League by the Polish Football Association in the Domestic Champions Path.
24. Portugal (POR): The 2019–20 Campeonato Nacional Juniores S19 was abandoned due to the COVID-19 pandemic in Portugal. The top team of the league at the time of the abandonment, Benfica, were selected to play in the 2020–21 UEFA Youth League by the Portuguese Football Federation in the Domestic Champions Path.
25. Russia (RUS):The 2019–20 Russian Youth Football League U17 was abandoned due to the COVID-19 pandemic in Russia. The top team of the league at the time of the abandonment, Chertanovo Moscow (who were declared champions), were selected to play in the 2020–21 UEFA Youth League by the Russian Football Union in the Domestic Champions Path.
26. Scotland (SCO): The 2019–20 Scottish U18 League was abandoned due to the COVID-19 pandemic in Scotland. The top team of the league at the time of the abandonment, Rangers, were selected to play in the 2020–21 UEFA Youth League by the Scottish Football Association in the Domestic Champions Path.
27. Serbia (SRB): The 2019–20 Serbian U19 League was abandoned due to the COVID-19 pandemic in Serbia. The top team of the league at the time of the abandonment, Red Star Belgrade (who were declared champions), were selected to play in the 2020–21 UEFA Youth League by the Football Association of Serbia in the Domestic Champions Path.
28. Slovakia (SVK): The 2019–20 Slovak U19 League was abandoned due to the COVID-19 pandemic in Slovakia. The top team of the league at the time of the abandonment, Žilina, were selected to play in the 2020–21 UEFA Youth League by the Slovak Football Association in the Domestic Champions Path.
29. Slovenia (SVN): The 2019–20 Slovenian U19 League was abandoned due to the COVID-19 pandemic in Slovenia. The top team of the league at the time of the abandonment, Olimpija Ljubljana, were selected to play in the 2020–21 UEFA Youth League by the Football Association of Slovenia in the Domestic Champions Path.
30. Spain (ESP): The 2019–20 División de Honor Juvenil U19 was abandoned due to the COVID-19 pandemic in Spain. The top team of the league at the time of the abandonment based on the average number of points per matches played for each team, Celta Vigo, were selected to play in the 2020–21 UEFA Youth League by the Royal Spanish Football Federation in the Domestic Champions Path.
31. Switzerland (SUI): The 2019–20 Swiss U18 League was abandoned due to the COVID-19 pandemic in Switzerland. The top team of the league at the time of the abandonment, Basel, were selected to play in the 2020–21 UEFA Youth League by the Swiss Football Association in the Domestic Champions Path.
32. Turkey (TUR): The 2019–20 U19 Elit was abandoned due to the COVID-19 pandemic in Turkey. The top team of the league at the time of the abandonment, Galatasaray, were selected to play in the 2020–21 UEFA Youth League by the Turkish Football Federation in the Domestic Champions Path.
33. Ukraine (UKR): The 2019–20 Ukrainian U19 League was abandoned due to the COVID-19 pandemic in Ukraine. The top team of the league at the time of the abandonment, Dynamo Kyiv (who were declared champions), had already qualified for the UEFA Champions League Path via play-offs, so no team was selected to play in the 2020–21 UEFA Youth League by the Ukrainian Association of Football in the Domestic Champions Path.

== Squads ==
Players had to be born on or after 1 January 2002, with a maximum of five players born between 1 January 2001 and 31 December 2001 allowed in the 40-player squad, and a maximum of three of these players allowed per each match.

== Round and draw dates ==
The schedule of the competition was planned as follows (all draws were planned to be held at the UEFA headquarters in Nyon, Switzerland). The tournament would have originally started in September 2020, but was initially delayed to October due to the COVID-19 pandemic in Europe, which caused the group stage of the 2020–21 UEFA Champions League to be postponed. However, due to the continuing pandemic in Europe, UEFA announced a new format on 24 September 2020. Instead of a group stage in the UEFA Champions League Path and two-legged ties in the Domestic Champions Path, all rounds would have been played as single-legged knockout matches.

Schedule for 2020–21 UEFA Youth League
Round	Draw	Dates
Round of 64	27 January 2021	~~2–3 March 2021~~
Round of 32	12 March 2021 (morning)	~~6–7 April 2021~~
Round of 16	Cancelled	~~20–21 April 2021~~
Quarter-finals	Cancelled	~~4–5 May 2021~~
Semi-finals	Cancelled	~~17 May 2021 at Colovray Stadium, Nyon~~
Final	Cancelled	~~20 May 2021 at Colovray Stadium, Nyon~~

The schedule of the competition announced in June 2020, under the original format, was planned as follows (all draws were planned to be held at the UEFA headquarters in Nyon, Switzerland, unless stated otherwise).

Schedule for 2020–21 UEFA Youth League (original format)
Phase	Round	Draw date	First leg	Second leg
UEFA Champions League Path; Group stage	Matchday 1	1 October 2020 (Athens)	20–21 October 2020	
UEFA Champions League Path; Group stage	Matchday 2	1 October 2020 (Athens)	27–28 October 2020	
UEFA Champions League Path; Group stage	Matchday 3	1 October 2020 (Athens)	3–4 November 2020	
UEFA Champions League Path; Group stage	Matchday 4	1 October 2020 (Athens)	24–25 November 2020	
UEFA Champions League Path; Group stage	Matchday 5	1 October 2020 (Athens)	1–2 December 2020	
UEFA Champions League Path; Group stage	Matchday 6	1 October 2020 (Athens)	8–9 December 2020	
Domestic Champions Path	First round	6 October 2020	21 October 2020	4 November 2020
Domestic Champions Path	Second round	6 October 2020	25 November 2020	9 December 2020
Knockout phase	Play-offs	15 December 2020	9–10 February 2021	
Knockout phase	Round of 16	12 February 2021	2–3 March 2021	
Knockout phase	Quarter-finals	12 February 2021	16–17 March 2021	
Knockout phase	Semi-finals	12 February 2021	23 April 2021 at Colovray Stadium, Nyon	
Knockout phase	Final	12 February 2021	26 April 2021 at Colovray Stadium, Nyon	

== Round of 64 ==
=== Draw ===
The draw for the round of 64 was held on 27 January 2021 (12:00 CET for UEFA Champions League Path and 12:25 CET for Domestic Champions Path). The 32 teams from the UEFA Champions League Path and the 32 teams from the Domestic Champions Path were split, and in both paths, there were no seedings, but UEFA divided the teams in each path into four groups of eight teams, which would be drawn separately. The first team drawn in each tie would have been the home team. Teams from the same association in the UEFA Champions League Path could not be drawn against each other, and based on political restrictions, teams from Russia and Ukraine could not be drawn against each other.

UEFA Champions League Path
Group 1	Group 2	Group 3	Group 4
(Spain) Sevilla; (England) Manchester City; (Italy) Inter Milan; (Germany) Bayern Munich; (France) Paris Saint-Germain; (Portugal) Porto; (Ukraine) Shakhtar Donetsk; (Greece) Olympiacos	(Spain) Real Madrid; (England) Manchester United; (Italy) Atalanta; (Germany) RB Leipzig; (Russia) Krasnodar; (Belgium) Club Brugge; (Turkey) İstanbul Başakşehir; (Netherlands) Ajax	(Spain) Atlético Madrid; (England) Chelsea; (Italy) Juventus; (Germany) Borussia Dortmund; (France) Rennes; (Russia) Zenit Saint Petersburg; (Austria) Red Bull Salzburg; (Denmark) Midtjylland	(Spain) Barcelona; (England) Liverpool; (Italy) Lazio; (Germany) Borussia Mönchengladbach; (France) Marseille; (Russia) Lokomotiv Moscow; (Ukraine) Dynamo Kyiv; (Hungary) Ferencváros

Domestic Champions Path
Group 1	Group 2	Group 3	Group 4
(Spain) Celta Vigo; (Greece) PAOK; (Cyprus) APOEL; (Poland) Górnik Zabrze; (Romania) Viitorul Constanța; (Slovenia) Olimpija Ljubljana; (Hungary) Győri ETO; (Albania) Apolonia	(Germany) 1. FC Köln; (Turkey) Galatasaray; (Netherlands) AZ; (Croatia) Dinamo Zagreb; (Scotland) Rangers; (Sweden) Hammarby IF; (Norway) Rosenborg; (Republic of Ireland) Waterford	(France) Angers; (Portugal) Benfica; (Belgium) Genk; (Czech Republic) Sparta Prague; (Denmark) Odense; (Switzerland) Basel; (Serbia) Red Star Belgrade; (Slovakia) Žilina	(Russia) Chertanovo Moscow; (Belarus) Dinamo Minsk; (Kazakhstan) Kairat; (Azerbaijan) Gabala; (Israel) Maccabi Haifa; (Bulgaria) Ludogorets Razgrad; (North Macedonia) Shkëndija; (Moldova) Sheriff Tiraspol

=== Summary ===
The matches would have been played on 24 February, 2, 3 and 4 March 2021.

Home team	Score	Away team
UEFA Champions League Path
Olympiacos (Greece)	~~3 Mar~~	(England) Manchester City
Inter Milan (Italy)	~~3 Mar~~	(Germany) Bayern Munich
Sevilla (Spain)	~~3 Mar~~	(France) Paris Saint-Germain
Shakhtar Donetsk (Ukraine)	~~3 Mar~~	(Portugal) Porto
Ajax (Netherlands)	~~3 Mar~~	(Russia) Krasnodar
Manchester United (England)	~~2 Mar~~	(Spain) Real Madrid
İstanbul Başakşehir (Turkey)	~~2 Mar~~	(Belgium) Club Brugge
Atalanta (Italy)	~~2 Mar~~	(Germany) RB Leipzig
Zenit Saint Petersburg (Russia)	~~3 Mar~~	(France) Rennes
Juventus (Italy)	~~2 Mar~~	(Germany) Borussia Dortmund
Midtjylland (Denmark)	~~3 Mar~~	(Spain) Atlético Madrid
Chelsea (England)	~~3 Mar~~	(Austria) Red Bull Salzburg
Liverpool (England)	~~2 Mar~~	(France) Marseille
Dynamo Kyiv (Ukraine)	~~2 Mar~~	(Spain) Barcelona
Lokomotiv Moscow (Russia)	~~3 Mar~~	(Hungary) Ferencváros
Borussia Mönchengladbach (Germany)	~~2 Mar~~	(Italy) Lazio
Domestic Champions Path
Górnik Zabrze (Poland)	~~3 Mar~~	(Greece) PAOK
Olimpija Ljubljana (Slovenia)	~~3 Mar~~	(Spain) Celta Vigo
APOEL (Cyprus)	~~3 Mar~~	(Romania) Viitorul Constanța
Apolonia (Albania)	~~2 Mar~~	(Hungary) Győri ETO
Dinamo Zagreb (Croatia)	~~3 Mar~~	(Norway) Rosenborg
Hammarby IF (Sweden)	~~3 Mar~~	(Republic of Ireland) Waterford
Galatasaray (Turkey)	~~2 Mar~~	(Netherlands) AZ
Rangers (Scotland)	~~2 Mar~~	(Germany) 1. FC Köln
Angers (France)	~~2 Mar~~	(Serbia) Red Star Belgrade
Genk (Belgium)	~~3 Mar~~	(Slovakia) Žilina
Sparta Prague (Czech Republic)	~~2 Mar~~	(Portugal) Benfica
Basel (Switzerland)	~~24 Feb~~	(Denmark) Odense
Sheriff Tiraspol (Moldova)	~~2 Mar~~	(Kazakhstan) Kairat
Chertanovo Moscow (Russia)	~~2 Mar~~	(Israel) Maccabi Haifa
Dinamo Minsk (Belarus)	~~3 Mar~~	(Bulgaria) Ludogorets Razgrad
Shkëndija (North Macedonia)	~~4 Mar~~	(Azerbaijan) Gabala

== Round of 32 ==
The draw for the round of 32 would have been held on 12 March 2021 (morning). The 16 winners of the round of 64 from the UEFA Champions League Path and the 16 winners of the round of 64 from the Domestic Champions Path are split, and in both paths, there are no seedings. Teams from the same association in the UEFA Champions League Path cannot be drawn against each other.

The matches would have been played on 6 and 7 April 2021.

== Round of 16 ==
The draw for the round of 16 onwards would have been held on 12 March 2021 (afternoon). The eight winners of the round of 32 from the UEFA Champions League Path and the eight winners of the round of 32 from the Domestic Champions Path, whose identity is not known at the time of draw, would have been combined starting from the round of 16.

The matches would have been played on 20 and 21 April 2021.

== Quarter-finals ==
The matches would have been played on 4 and 5 May 2021.

== Semi-finals ==
The matches would have been played on 17 May 2021 at the Colovray Stadium, Nyon.

== Final ==
The match would have been played on 20 May 2021 at the Colovray Stadium, Nyon.
