= Aurélio Pereira =

Portuguese football coach (1947–2025)

Aurélio da Silva Pereira (1 October 1947 – 8 April 2025) was a Portuguese football coach and youth player scout who was professionally involved with the men's football team of Sporting CP for several decades. Firstly, as a player at youth and junior level; then, as coach of all the Sporting CP's youth teams (two-time national youth champion); and, finally, as sporting director of all youth football in 1995-96 and 1996–97. In 1988, he was the mastermind and creator of the Sporting CP's world-renowned recruitment and youth development department, which he coordinated for over 30 years. Hundreds of boys were scouted and coached under his direct supervision and responsibility across decades of work as a youth coach and scout at Sporting CP; some of them would become notable world-class footballers, such as Paulo Futre, Luis Figo and Cristiano Ronaldo.

== Early life and career ==
Born on 1 October 1947 in Lisbon, Aurélio da Silva Pereira started his career in football at Sporting CP as a youth player, later joining Operário (from Alfama neighbourhood) and Fofó as a player. As a coach for Fofó, he managed to take the club to the national championships. Having already had a successful career in business as a salesman, he became a coach in his spare time to help his brother. Then, responding to a challenge from Hilário, one of Sporting CP's most notable players from 1958 to 1973, Aurélio da Silva Pereira returned to Sporting CP, where he coached youth football for over twenty years. In 1988, he decided to create the Recruitment and Training Department of Sporting CP, within which he developed a national network of scouts to identify young football talent. It was this new systematized network, born from its smaller predecessor which was also operating under the supervision of Aurélio Pereira (Paulo Futre was discovered by Pereira in 1975), that allowed Sporting CP to be the first to discover promising players such as Emílio Peixe, Luís Figo, Simão Sabrosa, Ricardo Quaresma, Nani or Cristiano Ronaldo. With the creation of the Sporting Academy and the progressive professionalisation of the department he created, Aurélio da Silva Pereira ceased to be just a natural talent spotter, reinforcing the image of a trainer by regularly bringing new players into Sporting CP's teams.

== Personal life and death ==
Aurélio Pereira was the brother of Carlos Pereira, who as a player, served Sporting CP for 13 years and as a coach, worked in the club's youth team and was Paulo Bento's assistant in the main team between October 2005 and November 2009. Carlos Pereira also coached Belenenses and Alverca.

Pereira died on 8 April 2025, at the age of 77.

== Honours and recognition ==
For his career, he was honoured twice with Sporting CP's Stromp Award (in 1982 in the Technical category and in 2002 in the Dedication category) and in 2006 with the Golden Lion. On 3 September 2012, Sporting CP paid tribute to Aurélio da Silva Pereira by naming the main pitch at the club's academy after him. The ceremony was attended by many of the talents he discovered, testifying to the importance that Aurélio da Silva Pereira played in sports training, particularly football, over more than forty years. In January 2017, he was awarded the City of Lisbon Sports Merit Medal. The insignia awarded by the President of the Republic to Aurélio da Silva Pereira were received by his daughter, Mafalda Pereira. In 2018, he was awarded the UEFA Order of Merit and, next to Sporting CP's Pavilhão João Rocha indoor arena Sporting CP presented its new youth football academy school (Escola Academia Aurélio Pereira) named after Aurélio Pereira with three five-a-side football fields, with the aim of complementing the Pólo EUL (Sporting CP's facilities for U13 development footballers at the EUL – Estádio Universitário de Lisboa). After his retirement, Aurélio Pereira was appointed consultant of Sporting CP's youth development system. On 20 November 2023 he won the Quinas de Ouro trophy awarded by the Portuguese Football Federation.

== Published works ==
In 2021, Aurélio Pereira published the book Ver para Crer – Memórias de Descoberta e Formação de Talento, written with the help of journalist Rui Miguel Tovar.
