= Campeonato Nacional de Juvenis =

Football league in Portugal

- Founded: 1962
- Country: Portugal
- Confederation: UEFA
- Number of clubs: 50
- Level on pyramid: 1
- Current champions: Porto (21st title)
- Most championships: Benfica (22 titles)
- Website: fpf.pt
- Current: 2025–26

Campeonato Nacional de Juniores B/Juvenis is the top level of the Portuguese football league system for youth players 17-year-old and under. It is administrated by the Portuguese Football Federation. The league started in 1962 and has been historically dominated by the Big Three clubs.

== Format ==
The Campeonato Nacional de Juvenis begins in mid-August and ends in June. The Nacional de Juvenis season is played in three phases. In the first phase there are four regional groups of twelve teams. The top four teams of each group qualify to one of two the second phase Apuramento de Campeão groups. There are two groups composed of eight teams, North and South. The top two teams and best third placed team qualify directly to the third phase while the second best third placed team and best fourth placed team play a third phase Apuramento league with the Azores and Madeira regional champions, with the top team qualifying to the third phase. The bottom 8 teams of each first phase group move into four different Apuramento de Manutenção/Descida leagues with the bottom four being relegated to the regional leagues. The third phase is a single group of six teams that face each other to determine the champion.

== Winners ==
Season	Champions
1962–63	Sporting CP
1963–64	Benfica
1964–65	Sporting CP (2)
1965–66	Porto
1966–67	Académica
1967–68	Benfica (2)
1968–69	Benfica (3)
1969–70	Porto (2)
1970–71	Porto (3)
1971–72	Porto (4)
1972–73	Porto (5)
1973–74	Benfica (4)
1974–75	Benfica (5)
1975–76	Sporting CP (3)
1976–77	Porto (6)
1977–78	CC Lamego
1978–79	Porto (7)
1979–80	Porto (8)
1980–81	Braga
1981–82	Porto (9)
1982–83	Benfica (6)
1983–84	Sporting CP (4)
1984–85	Porto (10)
1985–86	Porto (11)
1986–87	Sporting CP (5)
1987–88	Porto (12)
1988–89	Porto (13)
1989–90	Benfica (7)
1990–91	Benfica (8)
1991–92	Benfica (9)
1992–93	Benfica (10)
1993–94	Sporting CP (6)
1994–95	Porto (14)
1995–96	Benfica (11)
1996–97	Benfica (12)
1997–98	Porto (15)
1998–99	Sporting CP (7)
1999–2000	Boavista
2000–01	Benfica (13)
2001–02	Porto (16)
2002–03	Porto (17)
2003–04	Sporting CP (8)
2004–05	Sporting CP (9)
2005–06	Sporting CP (10)
2006–07	Sporting CP (11)
2007–08	Benfica (14)
2008–09	Porto (18)
2009–10	Porto (19)
2010–11	Benfica (15)
2011–12	Porto (20)
2012–13	Benfica (16)
2013–14	Vitória Guimarães
2014–15	Benfica (17)
2015–16	Sporting CP (12)
2016–17	Sporting CP (13)
2017–18	Benfica (18)
2018–19	Benfica (19)
2019–20	Not awarded (Note: Abandoned due to COVID-19 pandemic)
2020–21	Not played (Note: Not played due to COVID-19 pandemic)
2021–22	Sporting CP (14)
2022–23	Benfica (20)
2023–24	Benfica (21)
2024–25	Benfica (22)
2025–26	Porto (21)

== Performance by club ==
Club	Winners	Seasons
Benfica	22	1963–64, 1967–68, 1968–69, 1973–74, 1974–75, 1982–83, 1989–90, 1990–91, 1991–92, 1992–93, 1995–96, 1996–97, 2000–01, 2007–08, 2010–11, 2012–13, 2014–15, 2017–18, 2018–19, 2022–23, 2023–24, 2024–25
Porto	21	1965–66, 1969–70, 1970–71, 1971–72, 1972–73, 1976–77, 1978–79, 1979–80, 1981–82, 1984–85, 1985–86, 1987–88, 1988–89, 1994–95, 1997–98, 2001–02, 2002–03, 2008–09, 2009–10, 2011–12, 2025–26
Sporting CP	14	1962–63, 1964–65, 1975–76, 1983–84, 1986–87, 1993–94, 1998–99, 2003–04, 2004–05, 2005–06, 2006–07, 2015–16, 2016–17, 2021–22
Académica	1	1966–67
CC Lamego	1	1977–78
Braga	1	1980–81
Boavista	1	1999–2000
Vitória Guimarães	1	2013–14
