= Campeonato Nacional de Iniciados =

Football league in Portugal

- Founded: 1974
- Country: Portugal
- Confederation: UEFA
- Number of clubs: 50
- Level on pyramid: 1
- Current champions: Porto (15th title)
- Most championships: Sporting & Porto (15 titles each)
- Website: fpf.pt
- Current: 2025–26

Campeonato Nacional de Juniores C/Iniciados is the top level of the Portuguese football league system for youth players 15-year-old and under. It is administrated by the Portuguese Football Federation. The league started in 1974 and has been historically dominated by the Big Three clubs.

== Winners ==
Season	Champions
1974–75	Porto
1975–76	Belenenses
1976–77	Porto (2)
1977–78	Porto (3)
1978–79	Benfica
1979–80	Porto (4)
1980–81	Porto (5)
1981–82	Benfica (2)
1982–83	Sporting CP
1983–84	Sporting CP (2)
1984–85	Benfica (3)
1985–86	Porto (6)
1986–87	Sporting CP (3)
1987–88	Boavista
1988–89	Benfica (4)
1989–90	Porto (7)
1990–91	Boavista (2)
1991–92	Sporting CP (4)
1992–93	Sporting CP (5)
1993–94	Sporting CP (6)
1994–95	Boavista (3)
1995–96	Vitória Guimarães
1996–97	Porto (8)
1997–98	Porto (9)
1998–99	Not awarded
1999–2000	Porto (10)
2000–01	Not awarded
2001–02	Porto (11)
2002–03	Sporting CP (7)
2003–04	Sporting CP (8)
2004–05	Porto (12)
2005–06	Sporting CP (9)
2006–07	Porto (13)
2007–08	Sporting CP (10)
2008–09	Benfica (5)
2009–10	Benfica (6)
2010–11	Porto (14)
2011–12	Benfica (7)
2012–13	Sporting CP (11)
2013–14	Benfica (8)
2014–15	Sporting CP (12)
2015–16	Benfica (9)
2016–17	Benfica (10)
2017–18	Sporting CP (13)
2018–19	Sporting CP (14)
2019–20	Not awarded (Note: Abandoned due to COVID-19 pandemic)
2020–21	Not played (Note: Not played due to COVID-19 pandemic)
2021–22	Sporting CP (15)
2022–23	Benfica (11)
2023–24	Benfica (12)
2024–25	Benfica (13)
2025–26	Porto (15)

== Performance by club ==
Club	Winners	Seasons
Sporting CP	15	1982–83, 1983–84, 1986–87, 1991–92, 1992–93, 1993–94, 2002–03, 2003–04, 2005–06, 2007–08, 2012–13, 2014–15, 2017–18, 2018–19, 2021–22
Porto	15	1974–75, 1976–77, 1977–78, 1979–80, 1980–81, 1985–86, 1989–90, 1996–97, 1997–98, 1999–00, 2001–02, 2004–05, 2006–07, 2010–11, 2025–26
Benfica	13	1978–79, 1981–82, 1984–85, 1988–89, 2008–09, 2009–10, 2011–12, 2013–14, 2015–16, 2016–17, 2022–23, 2023–24, 2024–25
Boavista	3	1987–88, 1990–91, 1994–95
Belenenses	1	1975–76
Vitória Guimarães	1	1995–96
