= 2019–20 División de Honor Juvenil de Fútbol =

División de Honor Juvenil de Fútbol
- Season: 2019–20

The 2019–20 División de Honor Juvenil de Fútbol season was the 34th since its establishment.

== Competition format ==
- The champion of each group and the best runner-up would have played in the 2020 Copa de Campeones and the Copa del Rey.
- The other six runners-up and the two best third-placed teams would have played for the Copa del Rey.
- In each group, at least four teams (thirteenth placed on down) would have been relegated to Liga Nacional.
- The champion of the Copa de Campeones would get a place for the 2020–21 UEFA Youth League.

== Suspension and curtailment ==
In March 2020, all fixtures were suspended due to the COVID-19 pandemic in Spain. On 6 May 2020, the Royal Spanish Football Federation announced the premature end of the leagues, revoking all relegations, declaring each divisional leader as champion and cancelling the Copa del Rey Juvenil and the Copa de Campeones for the season.

== League tables ==
=== Group 1 ===
Pos	Team	Pld	W	D	L	GF	GA	GD	Pts
1	Celta Vigo (C)	25	21	4	0	76	19	+57	67
2	Sporting Gijón	25	19	5	1	73	18	+55	62
3	Deportivo La Coruña	25	13	6	6	41	25	+16	45
4	Racing Santander	25	13	5	7	53	38	+15	44
5	Bansander	25	10	10	5	34	24	+10	40
6	Oviedo	25	11	4	10	40	39	+1	37
7	Val Miñor	25	10	4	11	39	34	+5	34
8	Conxo	25	8	9	8	32	37	−5	33
9	Roces	25	10	2	13	34	42	−8	32
10	Lugo	25	8	6	11	33	37	−4	30
11	Ural	25	8	6	11	32	41	−9	30
12	Atlético Perines	25	8	6	11	23	41	−18	30
13	Racing Ferrol	25	6	6	13	25	40	−15	24
14	Avilés	25	5	5	15	18	49	−31	20
15	Calasanz	25	4	4	17	23	54	−31	16
16	Marina	25	3	4	18	19	57	−38	13

Updated to match(es) played on 8 March 2020. Source: RFEF
Rules for classification: 1) Points; 2) Goal difference; 3) Number of goals scored
(C) Declared champions (season curtailed)

=== Group 2 ===
Pos	Team	Pld	W	D	L	GF	GA	GD	Pts
1	Athletic Bilbao (C)	25	18	3	4	64	21	+43	57
2	Real Sociedad	25	15	3	7	66	24	+42	48
3	Osasuna	25	15	3	7	43	26	+17	48
4	Eibar	25	14	3	8	54	31	+23	45
5	Alavés	25	10	12	3	51	30	+21	42
6	Danok Bat	25	11	8	6	35	26	+9	41
7	Arenas	25	9	6	10	29	31	−2	33
8	San Juan	25	8	8	9	28	35	−7	32
9	Numancia	25	8	8	9	34	53	−19	32
10	Antiguoko	25	8	6	11	38	45	−7	30
11	Leioa	25	8	6	11	29	38	−9	30
12	Txantrea	25	7	9	9	32	42	−10	30
13	Pamplona	25	8	6	11	23	34	−11	30
14	UD Logroñés	25	7	8	10	27	45	−18	29
15	Mutilvera	25	3	6	16	22	52	−30	15
16	Valvanera	25	2	3	20	15	57	−42	9

Updated to match(es) played on 8 March 2020. Source: RFEF
Rules for classification: 1) Points; 2) Goal difference; 3) Number of goals scored
(C) Declared champions (season curtailed)

=== Group 3 ===
Pos	Team	Pld	W	D	L	GF	GA	GD	Pts
1	Barcelona (C)	25	20	3	2	82	13	+69	63
2	Zaragoza	25	20	1	4	55	22	+33	61
3	Espanyol	25	19	3	3	87	23	+64	60
4	Europa	25	12	6	7	28	18	+10	42
5	Mallorca	25	11	8	6	41	34	+7	41
6	Cornellà	25	10	9	6	34	24	+10	39
7	Damm	25	11	5	9	52	40	+12	38
8	Girona	25	10	6	9	45	38	+7	36
9	Gimnàstic	25	8	10	7	32	23	+9	34
10	Stadium Casablanca	25	8	3	14	35	51	−16	27
11	San Francisco	25	6	6	13	31	50	−19	24
12	Huesca	25	5	9	11	17	39	−22	24
13	Ebro	25	5	8	12	28	55	−27	23
14	Atlético Villacarlos	25	6	2	17	23	68	−45	20
15	Lleida Esportiu	25	4	2	19	19	75	−56	14
16	Jàbac i Terrassa	25	2	5	18	17	53	−36	11

Updated to match(es) played on 8 March 2020. Source: RFEF
Rules for classification: 1) Points; 2) Goal difference; 3) Number of goals scored
(C) Declared champions (season curtailed)

=== Group 4 ===
Pos	Team	Pld	W	D	L	GF	GA	GD	Pts
1	Sevilla (C)	29	23	4	2	97	19	+78	73
2	Málaga	29	21	5	3	93	23	+70	68
3	Betis	29	20	4	5	98	23	+75	64
4	Calavera	29	17	8	4	49	21	+28	59
5	Granada	29	17	7	5	68	25	+43	58
6	San Félix	29	14	5	10	65	38	+27	47
7	Almería	29	13	8	8	54	39	+15	47
8	Cádiz	29	11	11	7	45	35	+10	44
9	Vázquez Cultural	29	13	5	11	43	42	+1	44
10	Santa Fe	29	11	2	16	53	68	−15	35
11	Córdoba	29	10	4	15	42	44	−2	34
12	Nervión	29	8	8	13	32	44	−12	32
13	26 de Febrero	29	7	8	14	26	50	−24	29
14	Castilleja	29	7	7	15	27	44	−17	28
15	Recreativo	29	8	4	17	48	74	−26	28
16	Dos Hermanas–San Andrés	29	2	10	17	28	61	−33	16
17	Gimnástica Ceuta	29	4	3	22	26	125	−99	15
18	Peña Barcelonista Melilla	29	1	5	23	13	132	−119	8

Updated to match(es) played on 8 March 2020. Source: RFEF
Rules for classification: 1) Points; 2) Goal difference; 3) Number of goals scored
(C) Declared champions (season curtailed)

=== Group 5 ===
Pos	Team	Pld	W	D	L	GF	GA	GD	Pts
1	Real Madrid (C)	25	21	3	1	83	14	+69	66
2	Atlético Madrid	25	20	2	3	50	9	+41	62
3	Valladolid	25	15	4	6	54	25	+29	49
4	Rayo Vallecano	25	11	6	8	25	27	−2	39
5	Getafe	25	11	5	9	32	24	+8	38
6	Rayo Majadahonda	25	10	4	11	30	38	−8	34
7	Leganés	25	10	3	12	30	39	−9	33
8	Burgos	25	9	5	11	27	32	−5	32
9	Alcorcón	25	8	7	10	24	28	−4	31
10	Aravaca	25	8	5	12	29	47	−18	29
11	Unión Adarve	25	7	6	12	31	39	−8	27
12	Badajoz	25	7	6	12	21	29	−8	27
13	Extremadura	25	6	8	11	32	47	−15	26
14	Móstoles	25	7	4	14	34	53	−19	25
15	Santa Marta de Tormes	25	7	3	15	23	53	−30	24
16	Atlético Pinto	25	4	7	14	27	48	−21	19

Updated to match(es) played on 8 March 2020. Source: RFEF
Rules for classification: 1) Points; 2) Goal difference; 3) Number of goals scored
(C) Declared champions (season curtailed)

=== Group 6 ===
Pos	Team	Pld	W	D	L	GF	GA	GD	Pts
1	Las Palmas (C)	25	21	2	2	61	9	+52	65
2	Tenerife	25	16	4	5	57	15	+42	52
3	Acodetti	25	15	5	5	57	32	+25	50
4	Orientación Marítima	25	14	3	8	42	33	+9	45
5	San José	25	12	7	6	41	29	+12	43
6	Sobradillo	25	10	7	8	34	35	−1	37
7	Unión Viera	25	11	4	10	48	45	+3	37
8	Huracán	25	9	4	12	43	42	+1	31
9	Maspalomas	25	9	4	12	33	45	−12	31
10	Los Llanos	25	7	9	9	34	41	−7	30
11	Laguna	25	7	8	10	25	28	−3	29
12	Juventud Laguna	25	7	4	14	31	56	−25	25
13	Victoria	25	6	7	12	34	53	−19	25
14	Marino	25	4	7	14	34	63	−29	19
15	Ofra	25	4	7	14	23	52	−29	19
16	San Fernando	25	3	8	14	20	39	−19	17

Updated to match(es) played on 11 March 2020. Source: RFEF
Rules for classification: 1) Points; 2) Goal difference; 3) Number of goals scored
(C) Declared champions (season curtailed)

=== Group 7 ===
Pos	Team	Pld	W	D	L	GF	GA	GD	Pts
1	Villarreal (C)	25	19	4	2	67	19	+48	61
2	Levante	25	18	5	2	49	14	+35	59
3	Roda	25	17	5	3	46	17	+29	56
4	Valencia	25	17	3	5	58	20	+38	54
5	Atlético Madrileño	25	11	5	9	38	27	+11	38
6	Elche	25	10	7	8	41	26	+15	37
7	Albacete	25	7	10	8	36	37	−1	31
8	Alboraya	25	8	6	11	29	41	−12	30
9	Torre Levante	25	8	5	12	28	44	−16	29
10	Patacona	25	7	8	10	34	33	+1	29
11	UCAM Murcia	25	7	7	11	18	30	−12	28
12	Lorca	25	7	6	12	22	44	−22	27
13	Murcia	25	6	6	13	21	46	−25	24
14	Toledo	25	6	3	16	15	46	−31	21
15	Alzira	25	5	5	15	14	35	−21	20
16	Hércules	25	3	3	19	17	54	−37	12

Updated to match(es) played on 8 March 2020. Source: RFEF
Rules for classification: 1) Points; 2) Goal difference; 3) Number of goals scored
(C) Declared champions (season curtailed)
