= Campeonato Nacional de Juniores =

Football league in Portugal

- Founded: 1938
- Country: Portugal
- Confederation: UEFA
- Number of clubs: 24
- Level on pyramid: 1
- Relegation to: Campeonato Nacional Juniores A – 2ª Divisão
- Current champions: Porto (24th title)
- Most championships: Benfica (26 titles)
- Website: fpf.pt
- Current: 2025–26

The Campeonato Nacional de Juniores is the top level of the Portuguese football league system for youth players (19-year-old and under). It is administrated by the Portuguese Football Federation. The league started in 1938 and has been historically dominated by the Big Three clubs, with Benfica having the most titles won (26).

== Format ==
The Campeonato Nacional de Juniores begins in the first weekend of September and ends in June. The Nacional de Juniors season is similar to the senior players' Primeira Liga playing a double round-robin points based system. There are two groups composed of 12 teams, North and South. The top four teams with the most points in each group progress to the Apuramento de Campeão, where they face each other in a similar way to the first round, to determine the champion.

The bottom eight teams of each group, progress to the Apuramento de Manutenção, where they face each other. The bottom three of each group are relegated.

== Winners ==
Season	Champions
1938–39	Sporting CP
1939–40	Unidos Barreiro
1940–41	Not played
1941–42	Leixões
1942–43	Not played
1943–44	Benfica
1944–45	Benfica (2)
1945–46	Sporting CP (2)
1946–47	Belenenses
1947–48	Sporting CP (3)
1948–49	Benfica (3)
1949–50	Académica
1950–51	Benfica (4)
1951–52	Académica (2)
1952–53	Porto
1953–54	Académica (3)
1954–55	Benfica (5)
1955–56	Sporting CP (4)
1956–57	Benfica (6)
1957–58	Benfica (7)
1958–59	Benfica (8)
1959–60	Benfica (9)
1960–61	Sporting CP (5)
1961–62	Benfica (10)
1962–63	Benfica (11)
1963–64	Porto (2)
1964–65	Sporting CP (6)
1965–66	Porto (3)
1966–67	Not played
1967–68	Benfica (12)
1968–69	Porto (4)
1969–70	Benfica (13)
1970–71	Porto (5)
1971–72	Benfica (14)
1972–73	Porto (6)
1973–74	Sporting CP (7)
1974–75	Benfica (15)
1975–76	Benfica (16)
1976–77	Braga
1977–78	Benfica (17)
1978–79	Porto (7)
1979–80	Porto (8)
1980–81	Porto (9)
1981–82	Porto (10)
1982–83	Sporting CP (8)
1983–84	Porto (11)
1984–85	Benfica (18)
1985–86	Porto (12)
1986–87	Porto (13)
1987–88	Benfica (19)
1988–89	Benfica (20)
1989–90	Porto (14)
1990–91	Vitória Guimarães
1991–92	Sporting CP (9)
1992–93	Porto (15)
1993–94	Porto (16)
1994–95	Boavista
1995–96	Sporting CP (10)
1996–97	Boavista (2)
1997–98	Porto (17)
1998–99	Boavista (3)
1999–2000	Benfica (21)
2000–01	Porto (18)
2001–02	Alverca
2002–03	Boavista (4)
2003–04	Benfica (22)
2004–05	Sporting CP (11)
2005–06	Sporting CP (12)
2006–07	Porto (19)
2007–08	Sporting CP (13)
2008–09	Sporting CP (14)
2009–10	Sporting CP (15)
2010–11	Porto (20)
2011–12	Sporting CP (16)
2012–13	Benfica (23)
2013–14	Braga (2)
2014–15	Porto (21)
2015–16	Porto (22)
2016–17	Sporting CP (17)
2017–18	Benfica (24)
2018–19	Porto (23)
2019–20	Not awarded (Note: Abandoned due to the COVID-19 pandemic)
2020–21	Not played (Note: Not played due to the COVID-19 pandemic)
2021–22	Benfica (25)
2022–23	Famalicão
2023–24	Braga (3)
2024–25	Benfica (26)
2025–26	Porto (24)

== Performance by club ==
Club	Winners	Seasons
Benfica	26	1943–44, 1944–45, 1948–49, 1950–51, 1954–55, 1956–57, 1957–58, 1958–59, 1959–60, 1961–62, 1962–63, 1967–68, 1969–70, 1971–72, 1974–75, 1975–76, 1977–78, 1984–85, 1987–88, 1988–89, 1999–2000, 2003–04, 2012–13, 2017–18, 2021–22, 2024–25
Porto	24	1952–53, 1963–64, 1965–66, 1968–69, 1970–71, 1972–73, 1978–79, 1979–80, 1980–81, 1981–82, 1983–84, 1985–86, 1986–87, 1989–90, 1992–93, 1993–94, 1997–98, 2000–01, 2006–07, 2010–11, 2014–15, 2015–16, 2018–19, 2025–26
Sporting CP	17	1938–39, 1945–46, 1947–48, 1955–56, 1960–61, 1964–65, 1973–74, 1982–83, 1991–92, 1995–96, 2004–05, 2005–06, 2007–08, 2008–09, 2009–10, 2011–12, 2016–17
Boavista	4	1994–95, 1996–97, 1998–99, 2002–03
Académica	3	1949–50, 1951–52, 1953–54
Braga	3	1976–77, 2013–14, 2023–24
Unidos Barreiro	1	1939–40
Leixões	1	1941–42
Belenenses	1	1946–47
Vitória Guimarães	1	1990–91
Alverca	1	2001–02
Famalicão	1	2022–23
