= Sporting CP (youth) =

Association football club in Portugal

Sporting (Youth)
- Full name: Sporting Clube de Portugal
- Founded: 1 July 1906
- Ground: Academia Cristiano Ronaldo
- Capacity: 1,180
- League: Several Youth Leagues
- Website: escolasacademia.sporting.pt
Home colours	Away colours

The Sporting Clube de Portugal Youth system is divided into six levels: Escolinhas (under-8), Infantis (under-13), Iniciados (under-15), Juvenis (under-17), Juniores (under-19) and Sub-23 (under-23).

The two youngest levels compete at regional level, being spread between the Academia Aurélio Pereira and the Pólo EUL, in Lisbon, and the Sporting CP Academies around the world. The four oldest levels compete at national level, being based at the Academia Cristiano Ronaldo.

At international level, the youth teams compete in several international tournaments, and the under-19 team competes in the UEFA Youth League.

== Youth Squads ==
=== Under-23 Team ===
As of 15 March 2026

Note: Flags indicate national team as defined under FIFA eligibility rules; some limited exceptions apply. Players may hold more than one non-FIFA nationality.

No.	Pos.	Nation	Player
—	GK	SRB	Luka Petrič
—	GK	POR	Guilherme Pires
—	GK	POR	Diogo Clara
—	GK	POR	Alexandre Tverdohlebov
—	GK	POR	Tiago Leitão
—	GK	POR	Miguel Gouveia
—	DF	POR	Daniel Lopes
—	DF	POR	Guilherme Silva
—	DF	POL	Daniel Ciesielski
—	DF	POR	Rayhan Momade
—	DF	ESP	Lucas Taibo
—	DF	POR	Konstantin Nikitenko
—	DF	POR	Atanásio Cunha
—	DF	POL	Jakub Stasiak
—	DF	POR	Denilson Santos
—	DF	GBS	Malam Malú
—	DF	POR	João Rijo
—	DF	POR	Miguel Alves
—	DF	POR	Afonso Lee
—	DF	POR	André Machado
—	DF	POR	Daniel Costa
—	DF	POR	Cris Palamarchuk
—	DF	POR	Rafael Mota
—	MF	POR	Leonardo Taveres
—	MF	POR	Rafael Camacho
—	MF	POR	Sandro Gambôa
—	MF	USA	Bento Estrela
—	MF	POR	Simão Soares
—	MF	ESP	Paulo Iago
—	MF	GBS	Frederico Gomes

No.	Pos.	Nation	Player
—	MF	ANG	Manuel Kissanga
—	MF	POR	Sandro Nascimento
—	MF	BEL	Zaïd Bafdili
—	MF	POR	Duarte Rosa
—	MF	NED	Ivanildo Mendes
—	MF	POR	Guilherme Santos
—	MF	POR	João Rodrigues
—	MF	POR	Paulo Simão
—	MF	POR	Afonso Marques
—	MF	BRA	Kauã Oliveira
—	FW	POR	Duarte Tomás
—	FW	POR	Gabriel Silva
—	FW	POR	Diogo Martins
—	FW	PER	Víctor Guzmán
—	FW	ANG	Délcio Aurélio
—	FW	POR	Sandro Ferreira
—	FW	POR	Flávio Gonçalves
—	FW	STP	Winilson Lopes
—	FW	POR	Brandão Baptista
—	FW	GBS	Micael Sanhá
—	FW	POR	Martim Peixoto
—	FW	NOR	Erik Ingebrethsen
—	FW	POR	Miguel Almeida
—	FW	CPV	Paulo Cardoso
—	FW	GBS	Sérgio Matos
—	FW	CIV	Chris Grombahi

Staff

- Head Coach: João Santos Cardoso
- Assistant Coach: Tiago Moreira
- Assistant Coach: Carlos Finisterra
- Goalkeeper Coach: Jaime Pombo
- Fitness Coach: Ricardo Dinis
- Analytics Coach: Pedro Garrido
- Goalkeeper Training Coordinator: João Spínola
- Personnel Development Coach: José Violante
- Personnel Development Coach: Eduardo Almeida
- Team Manager: Pedro Solha

=== Under-19 Team - Juniores ===
As of 15 March 2026

Note: Flags indicate national team as defined under FIFA eligibility rules; some limited exceptions apply. Players may hold more than one non-FIFA nationality.

No.	Pos.	Nation	Player
—	GK	USA	William Lodmell
—	GK	SRB	Luka Petrič
—	GK	POR	Miguel Gouveia
—	GK	POR	Alexandre Tverdohlebov
—	DF	POR	Rafael Mota
—	DF	POR	André Machado
—	DF	POR	Rodrigo Cabrito
—	DF	POR	Daniel Costa
—	DF	POR	Diego Coxi
—	DF	POR	Atanásio Cunha
—	DF	POR	Afonso Lee
—	DF	ESP	Lucas Taibo
—	DF	POR	Denilson Santos
—	DF	POR	Daniel Lopes
—	DF	POR	Duarte Correia
—	DF	POR	Cris Palamarchuk
—	DF	POR	Duarte Rosa
—	DF	POR	Salvador Blopa
—	DF	POR	Santiago Fernandes
—	DF	POR	Rodrigo Quintiães
—	DF	POL	Daniel Ciesielski
—	DF	POL	Jakub Stasiak
—	DF	POR	Edgar Sequeira
—	DF	POR	Rayhan Momade
—	DF	POR	João Rijo
—	MF	POR	Diego Farinha
—	MF	NED	Ivanildo Mendes
—	MF	POR	Sandro Gambôa
—	MF	POR	João Rodrigues
—	MF	BEL	Zaïd Bafdili

No.	Pos.	Nation	Player
—	MF	POR	Leonardo Tavares
—	MF	POR	Cleusio Garrafa
—	MF	ANG	Manuel Kissanga
—	MF	POR	Leonardo Varela
—	MF	POR	Paulo Simão
—	MF	POR	Simão Soares
—	MF	POR	Eduardo Felicíssimo
—	MF	POR	Rafael Camacho
—	MF	ESP	Paulo Iago
—	MF	CYP	Argyris Christodoulou
—	MF	POR	Sandro Nascimento
—	FW	POR	Martim Peixoto
—	FW	NOR	Erik Ingebrethsen
—	FW	POR	Diogo Martins
—	FW	COL	Sergio Siza
—	FW	GBS	Ansu Júnior
—	FW	POR	Sandro Ferreira
—	FW	GBS	Micael Sanhá
—	FW	POR	Brandão Baptista
—	FW	CIV	Chris Grombahi
—	FW	POR	José Cristiano
—	FW	GBS	Frederico Gomes
—	FW	POR	Miguel Almeida
—	FW	POR	Duarte Tomás
—	FW	POR	José Mendes
—	FW	POR	Gabriel Silva
—	FW	POR	Estefânio Rúben
—	FW	POR	Flávio Gonçalves
—	FW	POR	Tomás Mendes

Staff

- Head Coach: Mauro Miguel
- Assistant Coach: Rafael Pinto
- Assistant Coach: José Gomes
- Assistant Coach: Diogo Souto
- Goalkeeper Coach: Luís Caetano
- Fitness Coach: Hélder Jesus
- Analytics Coach: João Jorge
- Scout: Carlos Santos
- Scout: Rui Pedro de Sousa
- Scout: Rui Pinto
- Scout: André Figueiró

=== Under-17 Team - Juvenis ===
As of 15 March 2026

Note: Flags indicate national team as defined under FIFA eligibility rules; some limited exceptions apply. Players may hold more than one non-FIFA nationality.

No.	Pos.	Nation	Player
—	GK	POR	Joaquim Cabeçana
—	GK	POR	Guilherme Sousa Pinto
—	GK	POR	Rodrigo Pedro
—	GK	POR	Valdir Nascimento
—	GK	POR	Guilherme Fortunato
—	GK	POR	Afonso Redondo
—	GK	POR	Afonso Guerra
—	DF	POR	Samuel Tavares
—	DF	POR	Gonçalo Gaspar
—	DF	POR	Salvador Fortuna
—	DF	POR	Paulo Rodrigues
—	DF	POR	Mário William
—	DF	POR	Alexandre Rosado
—	DF	BRA	Eliabe Alves
—	DF	POR	Francisco Cabeçana
—	DF	POR	Reisson Batista
—	DF	POR	André Brito
—	DF	POR	Júnior Buaro
—	DF	POR	Rodrigo Mendes
—	DF	POR	Guilherme Varela
—	DF	POR	Dinis Santos
—	DF	POR	Henrique Tavares
—	DF	POR	João Rijo
—	MF	POR	Guilherme Figueiredo
—	MF	POR	Martim Almeida

No.	Pos.	Nation	Player
—	MF	POR	Diego Farinha
—	MF	ESP	Pablo Sánchez Valerón
—	MF	POR	Leonardo Varela
—	MF	POR	Francisco Simões
—	MF	POR	Victor Bastianele
—	MF	POR	Martim Baptista
—	MF	POR	Rodrigo Nogueira
—	MF	POR	Diogo Djabi
—	FW	POR	Martim Ribeiro
—	FW	POR	Leonardo Damião
—	FW	POR	Martim Oliveira
—	FW	POR	David Almeida
—	FW	POR	Duarte Tomás
—	FW	POR	Rafael Fial
—	FW	POR	José Garrafa
—	FW	POR	Mélvin Rosário
—	FW	BRA	João Guerra
—	FW	POR	Manuel Costa
—	FW	POR	Sandro Ferreira
—	FW	POR	Leonardo Paulin
—	FW	POR	Vítor Conceição
—	FW	POR	José Lino
—	FW	POR	Diego Moreira
—	FW	USA	Lewis Dawley
—	FW	POR	Afonso Marques

Staff

- Head Coach: Pedro Pontes
- Assistant Coach: Rúben Martinho
- Assistant Coach: Miguel Almeida
- Goalkeeper Coach: Diogo Neves
- Goalkeeper Coach: João Santos
- Fitness Coach: André Milheiro
- Analytics Coach: Gonçalo Garrido
- Nurse: Bruno Salgueiro
- Personnel Development Coach: Fábio Santos
- Equipment Technician: João Ribeiro

=== Under-15 Team - Iniciados ===
As of 16 March 2026

Note: Flags indicate national team as defined under FIFA eligibility rules; some limited exceptions apply. Players may hold more than one non-FIFA nationality.

No.	Pos.	Nation	Player
—	GK	POR	Joaquim Cabeçana
—	GK	POR	Martim Martins
—	GK	POR	Gustavo Teixeira
—	GK	POR	Tiago Gimo
—	DF	POR	Luca Barbieri
—	DF	POR	Salmán Umarji
—	DF	POR	João Afonso
—	DF	POR	Bernardo Lavos
—	DF	POR	Martim Sousa
—	DF	POR	Simão Sousa
—	DF	POR	César Sousa
—	DF	POR	Dinis Oliveira
—	DF	ESP	Nicolás Afonso
—	DF	POR	Borine Nanque
—	DF	POR	Aimar Torrado
—	DF	POR	Lucas Corrêa
—	MF	ESP	Jacobo Afonso
—	MF	BRA	David Makinde
—	MF	POR	Bernardo Busatori
—	MF	POR	Luís Abel

No.	Pos.	Nation	Player
—	MF	POR	Daniel Lopes
—	MF	POR	Laurindo Mendonça
—	MF	POR	Vasco Matias Ferreira
—	MF	POR	Edson Cotta
—	MF	POR	Francisco Sottomayor
—	MF	POR	Duarte Amado
—	MF	POR	Tiago Pereira
—	FW	ANG	Fernando Gabriel
—	FW	POR	Frederico Gonçalves
—	FW	POR	Duarte Gomes
—	FW	MDA	David Terna
—	FW	POR	Afonso Correia
—	FW	POR	Aladje Mussa
—	FW	POR	Diego Monteiro
—	FW	POR	Diego Veiga
—	FW	POR	Igor Ribeiro
—	FW	POR	Dinis Marques
—	FW	GBS	Capendja Silva
—	FW	POR	Diego Belmonte

Staff

- Head Coach: João Lourenço
- Assistant Coach: Rodrigo Gato
- Fitness Coach: José Pereira
- Analytics Coach: João Proença
- Trainee Coach: Diogo D'Aquino

== Academia Cristiano Ronaldo ==
Inaugurated in 2002, with 250,000 square meters, the Academia Cristiano Ronaldo is the football headquarters of Sporting CP.

In addition to being the training ground for the main team, the B team and the women's team, it is also where the under-15s, under-17s, under-19s and the under-23 team practice.

=== Estádio Aurélio Pereira ===
The Estádio Aurélio Pereira, located inside the Academia Cristiano Ronaldo, is where the under-15, the under-17, the under-19 and the under-23 teams play their home matches.

With a capacity for 1,189 spectators, it is named after Aurélio Pereira, the mentor and creator of Sporting CP world-renowned youth recruitment and development department, which he coordinated for over 30 years.

== Youth Program ==
The two most famous players to have come through Sporting CP youth system are Cristiano Ronaldo and Luís Figo, both having been regarded by FIFA as world's best players.

=== Notable Academy Graduates ===
List Criteria

- Player has made 25 appearances or more for his country at the highest international level
- Player who has been at least nominated for a world's best men's player award (Ballon d'Or/FIFA Ballon d'Or, FIFA World Player of the Year/The Best FIFA Men's Player) or won a continental best men's player award (UEFA Men's Player of the Year Award).

Name	Country	National Football Team		Best Result in Major Awards		
Name	Country	Apps	Goals	Ballon d'Or / FIFA Ballon d'Or	FIFA World Player of the Year / The Best FIFA Men's Player	UEFA Men's Player of the Year Award
Adrien Silva	Portugal	26	1	-	-	-
Augusto Inácio	Portugal	25	0	-	-	-
Beto	Portugal	31	2	-	-	-
**Cédric Soares**	Portugal	34	1	-	-	-
**Cristiano Ronaldo**	Portugal	226	143	**1st** (2008, 2016, 2017, 2013, 2014)	**1st** (2008, 2016, 2017)	**1st** (2013–14, 2015–16, 2016–17)
**Eric Dier**	England	49	3	-	-	-
Hugo Viana	Portugal	29	1	-	-	-
**João Moutinho**	Portugal	146	7	-	-	-
**João Mário**	Portugal	56	3	-	-	-
**João Palhinha**	Portugal	37	2	-	-	-
Jorge Cadete	Portugal	33	5	-	-	-
**José Fonte**	Portugal	50	1	-	-	-
Luís Boa Morte	Portugal	28	1	-	-	-
Luís Figo	Portugal	127	32	**1st** (2000)	**1st** (2001)	-
Marco Caneira	Portugal	25	0	-	-	-
Manuel Bento	Portugal	63	0	-	-	-
**Mica Pinto**	Luxembourg	41	1	-	-	-
Miguel Veloso	Portugal	56	3	-	-	-
**Nani**	Portugal	112	24	22nd (2011)	-	-
Nuno Valente	Portugal	33	1	-	-	-
**Nuno Mendes**	Portugal	41	1	9th (2025)	-	-
Paulo Futre	Portugal	41	6	2nd (1987)	-	-
**Rafael Leão**	Portugal	43	5	14th (2022)	-	-
Rui Águas	Portugal	31	10	-	-	-
Rui Patrício	Portugal	108	0	12th (2016)	-	-
Ricardo Quaresma	Portugal	80	10	36th (2007)	-	-
Silvestre Varela	Portugal	27	5	-	-	-
Simão Sabrosa	Portugal	85	22	-	-	-
Vítor Damas	Portugal	28	0	-	-	-
**William Carvalho**	Portugal	80	5	-	-	-
**Bold** denotes players still playing professional football. Caps and goals are correct as of 27 February 2026.

== Pólo EUL and EAS Aurélio Pereira ==
In 2007, Sporting CP and the University of Lisbon signed an protocol giving the club exclusive rights to use of some existing facilities located at the Lisbon University Stadium, known as the Pólo EUL. It is at this location where the Escolinhas and the rugby team are based.

In 2018, the president Frederico Varandas decided to open the first Escola Academia Sporting owned exclusively by the club. Located on the three pitches surrounding the Pavilhão João Rocha (named after Fernando Peyroteo, Luís Figo and Cristiano Ronaldo), the EAS Aurélio Pereira it is named after the club’s youth development icon, Aurélio Pereira, has capacity for 500 children and serves as a complement to the Pólo EUL.

== Escolas Academia Sporting ==
Launched in 2006, the Escolas Academia Sporting project is part of the Sporting CP youth development program. Consisting of a network with more than 50 academies located around the world, it currently has 6,500 athletes in its training program.

The purpose of this project is to identify players who may go on to complete their training at the Academia Cristiano Ronaldo, with a goal of becoming Sporting CP footballers.

The Escolas Academia Sporting apply the club's training model through a structured program that combines facilities, coaching staff and organized activities. The initiative is designed to introduce training methods to young players aged 5 to 14, regardless of gender, with an emphasis on development and the use of recreational time.

== Honors ==
=== Domestic Competitions ===
- Campeonato Nacional de Juniores – Under-19: 17

1938/1939, 1945/1946, 1947/1948, 1955/1956, 1960/1961, 1964/1965, 1973/1974, 1982/1983, 1991/1992, 1995/1996, 2004/2005, 2005/2006, 2007/2008, 2008/2009, 2009/2010, 2011/2012, 2016/2017

- Campeonato Nacional de Juvenis – Under-17: 14

1962/1963, 1964/1965, 1975/1976, 1983/1984, 1986/1987, 1993/1994, 1998/1999, 2003/2004, 2004/2005, 2005/2006, 2006/2007, 2015/2016, 2016/2017, 2021/2022

- Campeonato Nacional de Iniciados – Under-15: 15

1982/1983, 1983/1984, 1986/1987, 1991/1992, 1992/1993, 1993/1994, 2002/2003, 2003/2004, 2005/2006, 2007/2008, 2012/2013, 2014/2015, 2017/2018, 2018/2019, 2021/2022

- Campeonato Nacional de Infantis – Under-13: 3

1991/1992, 1994/1995, 1996/1997

== UEFA Youth League Record ==
Note: Sporting CP score is always listed first.

Season	Round	Opponent	Home	Away	Agg.
2014–15 UEFA Youth League	GS	(Slovenia) Maribor	3–2	3–1	3rd
2014–15 UEFA Youth League	GS	(England) Chelsea	0–5	0–6	3rd
2014–15 UEFA Youth League	GS	(Germany) Schalke 04	2–3	0–3	3rd
2016–17 UEFA Youth League	GS	(Spain) Real Madrid	1–3	1–1	3rd
2016–17 UEFA Youth League	GS	(Poland) Legia Warsaw	2–2	0–2	3rd
2016–17 UEFA Youth League	GS	(Germany) Borussia Dortmund	1–1	1–0	3rd
2017–18 UEFA Youth League	GS	(Greece) Olympiacos	1–1	2–2	2nd
2017–18 UEFA Youth League	GS	(Spain) FC Barcelona	0–1	1–1	2nd
2017–18 UEFA Youth League	GS	(Italy) Juventus FC	2–0	4–1	2nd
2017–18 UEFA Youth League	PO	(Austria) RB Salzburg	—N/a	2–5	
2021–22 UEFA Youth League	GS	(Netherlands) AFC Ajax	1–1	3–2	1st
2021–22 UEFA Youth League	GS	(Germany) Borussia Dortmund	3–2	0–0	1st
2021–22 UEFA Youth League	GS	(Turkey) Beşiktaş	1–2	3–1	1st
2021–22 UEFA Youth League	R16	(Ukraine) Dynamo Kyiv	—N/a	2–1	
2021–22 UEFA Youth League	QF	(Portugal) SL Benfica	0–4	—N/a	
2022–23 UEFA Youth League	GS	(Germany) Eintracht Frankfurt	1–0	1–1	1st
2022–23 UEFA Youth League	GS	(England) Tottenham Hotspur	2–0	2–1	1st
2022–23 UEFA Youth League	GS	(France) Olympique de Marseille	1–1	6–0	1st
2022–23 UEFA Youth League	R16	(Netherlands) AFC Ajax	5–1	—N/a	
2022–23 UEFA Youth League	QF	(England) Liverpool	1–0	—N/a	
2022–23 UEFA Youth League	SF	(Netherlands) AZ Alkmaar	2–2 (3–4 p)		
2024–25 UEFA Youth League	LP	(France) Lille OSC	2–2	—N/a	2nd
2024–25 UEFA Youth League	LP	(Netherlands) PSV Eindhoven	—N/a	2–0	2nd
2024–25 UEFA Youth League	LP	(Austria) Sturm Graz	—N/a	3–1	2nd
2024–25 UEFA Youth League	LP	(England) Manchester City	2–0	—N/a	2nd
2024–25 UEFA Youth League	LP	(England) Arsenal FC	3–0	—N/a	2nd
2024–25 UEFA Youth League	LP	(Belgium) Club Brugge	—N/a	1–0	2nd
2024–25 UEFA Youth League	R32	(France) AS Monaco	4–0	—N/a	
2024–25 UEFA Youth League	R16	(Germany) VfB Stuttgart	2–3	—N/a	
2025–26 UEFA Youth League	LP	(Kazakhstan) FC Kairat	3–2	—N/a	12th
2025–26 UEFA Youth League	LP	(Italy) Napoli	—N/a	1–1	12th
2025–26 UEFA Youth League	LP	(France) Olympique de Marseille	2–1	—N/a	12th
2025–26 UEFA Youth League	LP	(Italy) Juventus FC	—N/a	2–2	12th
2025–26 UEFA Youth League	LP	(Belgium) Club Brugge	2–1	—N/a	12th
2025–26 UEFA Youth League	LP	(Germany) Bayern Munich	—N/a	3–3	12th
2025–26 UEFA Youth League	R32	(Hungary) Puskás Akadémia	—N/a	2–1	
2025–26 UEFA Youth League	R16	(Germany) Eintracht Frankfurt	—N/a	1–0	
2025–26 UEFA Youth League	QF	(Spain) Real Madrid	—N/a	1–2	
2026–27 UEFA Youth League	LP	(Turkey) Galatasaray	2–2	—N/a	
2026–27 UEFA Youth League	LP	(France) RC Lens	—N/a	2–3	
2026–27 UEFA Youth League	LP	(Austria) LASK Linz		—N/a	
2026–27 UEFA Youth League	LP	(Ukraine) Shakhtar Donetsk	—N/a		
2026–27 UEFA Youth League	LP	(England) Manchester United		—N/a	
2026–27 UEFA Youth League	LP	(Italy) AS Roma	—N/a		
