= 2023–24 Real Zaragoza season =

Real Zaragoza
2023–24 season
- President: Jorge Mas
- Head coach: Fran Escribá (until 20 November); Julio Velázquez (from 20 November to 11 March); Víctor Fernández (from 11 March)
- Stadium: La Romareda
- Segunda División: 15th
- Copa del Rey: First round
- Top goalscorer: League: Maikel Mesa (11); All: Maikel Mesa (11)
- Highest home attendance: 27,208 vs Racing Santander
- Lowest home attendance: 16,838 vs Villarreal B

The 2023–24 season was Real Zaragoza's 92nd season in existence and 11th consecutive in the Segunda División, the second division of association football in Spain. They also competed in the Copa del Rey.

== Players ==
=== First-team squad ===
As of 23 August 2023

Note: Flags indicate national team as defined under FIFA eligibility rules; some limited exceptions apply. Players may hold more than one non-FIFA nationality.

| No. | Pos. | Nation | Player |
|---|---|---|---|
| 1 | GK | ARG | Cristian Álvarez (captain) |
| 3 | DF | POR | Jair Amador |
| 5 | MF | ESP | Jaume Grau |
| 6 | DF | ESP | Alejandro Francés |
| 7 | FW | ESP | Germán Valera (on loan from Atlético Madrid) |
| 8 | MF | ESP | Marc Aguado |
| 9 | FW | ESP | Iván Azón |
| 10 | MF | ESP | Sergio Bermejo |
| 11 | MF | ESP | Maikel Mesa |
| 12 | FW | TUR | Sinan Bakış |
| 13 | GK | FRA | Gaëtan Poussin |
| 14 | MF | ESP | Francho Serrano |

| No. | Pos. | Nation | Player |
|---|---|---|---|
| 15 | DF | URU | Santiago Mouriño (on loan from Atlético Madrid) |
| 17 | DF | ESP | Carlos Nieto |
| 18 | DF | ESP | Fran Gámez |
| 19 | FW | ESP | Manu Vallejo (on loan from Girona) |
| 20 | FW | ESP | Víctor Mollejo (on loan from Atlético Madrid) |
| 21 | MF | ESP | Toni Moya |
| 22 | DF | FRA | Quentin Lecoeuche |
| 23 | FW | ESP | Sergi Enrich |
| 24 | DF | ESP | Lluís López |
| 27 | DF | ESP | Marcos Luna |
| 35 | GK | ESP | Dani Rebollo |

=== Reserve team ===
Note: Flags indicate national team as defined under FIFA eligibility rules; some limited exceptions apply. Players may hold more than one non-FIFA nationality.

| No. | Pos. | Nation | Player |
|---|---|---|---|
| 26 | MF | ESP | Alberto Vaquero |
| 29 | FW | ESP | Pau Sans |
| 30 | FW | ESP | Pablo Cortés |

| No. | Pos. | Nation | Player |
|---|---|---|---|
| 34 | FW | ESP | Marcos Cuenca |
| 31 | DF | ESP | Juan Sebastián |
| 38 | DF | ESP | Andrés Borge |

=== Out on loan ===
Note: Flags indicate national team as defined under FIFA eligibility rules; some limited exceptions apply. Players may hold more than one non-FIFA nationality.

| No. | Pos. | Nation | Player |
|---|---|---|---|
| — | GK | ESP | Nico Rodríguez (at Teruel until 30 June 2024) |
| — | FW | ESP | Guillem Naranjo (at Sabadell until 30 June 2024) |
| — | FW | ESP | Luis Carbonell (at Tudelano until 30 June 2024) |

| No. | Pos. | Nation | Player |
|---|---|---|---|
| — | FW | ESP | Marcos Baselga (at Sabadell until 30 June 2024) |
| — | FW | ESP | Sabin Merino (at Racing Ferrol until 30 June 2024) |

== Transfers ==
=== In ===
| Pos. | Player | Transferred from | Fee | Date | Source |

=== Out ===
| Pos. | Player | Transferred to | Fee | Date | Source |

== Pre-season and friendlies ==
Win Draw Loss Fixtures

== Competitions ==
=== Overall record ===
| Competition | First match | Last match | Starting round | Final position | Record | | | | | | | |
| Competition | First match | Last match | Starting round | Final position | Pld | W | D | L | GF | GA | GD | Win % |
|---|---|---|---|---|---|---|---|---|---|---|---|---|
| Segunda División | 12 August 2023 | 2 June 2024 | Matchday 1 | 15th | 42 | 12 | 15 | 15 | 42 | 42 | +0 | 28.57 |
| Copa del Rey | 14 November 2023 | | First round | First round | 1 | 0 | 0 | 1 | 1 | 2 | −1 | 0.00 |
| Total | | | | | 43 | 12 | 15 | 16 | 43 | 44 | −1 | 27.91 |

Source: Soccerway

=== Segunda División ===
==== League table ====
| Pos | Team | Pld | W | D | L | GF | GA | GD | Pts |
|---|---|---|---|---|---|---|---|---|---|
| 13 | Albacete | 42 | 12 | 15 | 15 | 50 | 56 | −6 | 51 (Note: Albacete finished ahead of Cartagena and Zaragoza on head-to-head points: Albacete 6 pts, Cartagena 5 pts, Zaragoza 4 pts) |
| 14 | Cartagena | 42 | 14 | 9 | 19 | 37 | 51 | −14 | 51 |
| 15 | Zaragoza | 42 | 12 | 15 | 15 | 42 | 42 | 0 | 51 |
| 16 | Eldense | 42 | 12 | 14 | 16 | 46 | 56 | −10 | 50 |
| 17 | Huesca | 42 | 11 | 16 | 15 | 36 | 33 | +3 | 49 (Note: Huesca finished ahead of Mirandés on head-to-head points: Huesca 1–1 Mirandés, Mirandés 0–3 Huesca) |

Updated to match(es) played on 2 Jun 2024. Source: LaLiga HyperMotion
Rules for classification: 1) Points; 2) Head-to-head points; 3) Head-to-head goal difference; 4) Goal difference; 5) Goals scored; 6) Fair-play points
(Note: Head-to-head record is used only after all the matches between the teams in question have been played)

==== Results summary ====
| Overall | | | | | | | | Home | | | | | | Away | | | | | |
| Pld | W | D | L | GF | GA | GD | Pts | W | D | L | GF | GA | GD | W | D | L | GF | GA | GD |
|---|---|---|---|---|---|---|---|---|---|---|---|---|---|---|---|---|---|---|---|
| 42 | 12 | 15 | 15 | 42 | 42 | 0 | 51 | 7 | 6 | 8 | 25 | 23 | +2 | 5 | 9 | 7 | 17 | 19 | −2 |

Source: LALIGA HYPERMOTION

==== Results by round ====
| Round | 1 | 2 | 3 | 4 | 5 | 6 | 7 |
|---|---|---|---|---|---|---|---|
| Ground | H | H | A | H | A | H | A |
| Result | W | W | W | W | W | D | |
| Position | 4 | 2 | 1 | 1 | 1 | 1 | |

Updated to match(es) played on 15 September 2023. Source: LALIGA HYPERMOTION
A = Away; H = Home; W = Win; D = Draw; L = Loss

==== Matches ====
The league fixtures were unveiled on 28 June 2023.

| 12 August 2023 1 | Zaragoza | 2–0 | Villarreal B | Zaragoza |
| 21:00 CEST (UTC+2) | Mesa 56'; Serrano 63' | Report | | Stadium: La Romareda; Attendance: 16,838; Referee: Alejandro Quintero González |

| 18 August 2023 2 | Zaragoza | 1–0 | Valladolid | Zaragoza |
| 21:30 CEST (UTC+2) | Francés 31' | Report | | Stadium: La Romareda; Attendance: 21,023; Referee: Rubén Ávalos Barrera |

| 26 August 2023 3 | Tenerife | 0–1 | Zaragoza | Santa Cruz de Tenerife |
| 18:00 WEST (UTC+1) | | Report | Amador 69' | Stadium: Estadio Heliodoro Rodríguez López; Attendance: 18,801; Referee: Jon Ander González Esteban |

| 3 September 2023 4 | Zaragoza | 2–0 | Eldense | Zaragoza |
| 18:30 CEST (UTC+2) | Azón 42'; Sebastián 57' (o.g.) | Report | | Stadium: La Romareda; Attendance: 26,011; Referee: José Antonio López Toca |

| 10 September 2023 5 | Cartagena | 1–3 | Zaragoza | Cartagena |
| 18:30 CEST (UTC+2) | Solà 31' | Report | Vallejo 16'; Alcalá 39' (o.g.); Mollejo 90+2' | Stadium: Cartagonova; Referee: Saúl Ais Reig |

| 15 September 2023 6 | Zaragoza | 1–1 | Racing Santander | Zaragoza |
| 21:30 CEST (UTC+2) | Valera 45+2' | Report | Grenier 40' | Stadium: La Romareda; Attendance: 27,208; Referee: José Luis Guzmán Mansilla |

| 25 September 2023 7 | Racing Ferrol | v | Zaragoza | Ferrol |
| 21:00 CEST (UTC+2) | | Report | | Stadium: Estadio Municipal da Malata; Referee: Germán Cid Camacho |

| 25 February 2024 28 | Villarreal B | v | Zaragoza | Villarreal |
| 18:30 | | | | Stadium: Estadio de la Cerámica |

| 3 March 2024 29 | Zaragoza | v | Amorebieta | Valencia |
| 18:30 | | | | Stadium: Estadi Ciutat de València |

| 9 March 2024 30 | Valladolid | v | Zaragoza | Valladolid |
| 18:30 |

| 7 April 2024 34 | Levante | v | Zaragoza | Valencia |
| | | | | Stadium: Estadi Ciutat de València |
