= 2021–22 Real Zaragoza season =

Real Zaragoza
2021–22 season
- President: Christian Lapetra
- Head coach: Juan Ignacio Martínez
- Stadium: La Romareda
- Segunda División: 10th
- Copa del Rey: Round of 32
- Top goalscorer: League: Iván Azón; Valentin Vada (7 each); All: Iván Azón; Valentin Vada (7 each)
Home colours	Away colours

The 2021–22 season was the 90th season in the existence of Real Zaragoza and the club's ninth consecutive season in the second division of Spanish football. In addition to the domestic league, Real Zaragoza participated in this season's edition of the Copa del Rey.

== Players ==
=== First-team squad ===
As of 31 January 2022

Note: Flags indicate national team as defined under FIFA eligibility rules; some limited exceptions apply. Players may hold more than one non-FIFA nationality.

No.	Pos.	Nation	Player
1	GK	ARG	Cristian Álvarez (3rd captain)
2	DF	ESP	Carlos Vigaray
3	DF	ESP	Jair Amador
4	MF	SRB	Radosav Petrović
5	MF	ESP	Jaume Grau
6	DF	ESP	Alejandro Francés
7	FW	COL	Juanjo Narváez
8	MF	ESP	Eugeni Valderrama
10	FW	ESP	Sabin Merino
11	MF	ARG	Valentín Vada
13	GK	ESP	Álvaro Ratón
15	DF	ESP	Pep Chavarría

No.	Pos.	Nation	Player
16	DF	ESP	Dani Lasure
17	DF	ESP	Carlos Nieto
18	DF	ESP	Fran Gámez
20	FW	ESP	Álvaro Giménez (on loan from Cádiz)
21	MF	ESP	Alberto Zapater (captain)
22	MF	ESP	Sergio Bermejo
23	FW	ESP	Nano Mesa (on loan from Cádiz)
24	DF	ESP	Lluís López
26	MF	ESP	Borja Sainz (on loan from Alavés)
27	MF	ESP	Francho Serrano
31	FW	ESP	Iván Azón

=== Reserve team ===
Note: Flags indicate national team as defined under FIFA eligibility rules; some limited exceptions apply. Players may hold more than one non-FIFA nationality.

No.	Pos.	Nation	Player
28	DF	ESP	Javi Hernández
29	MF	ESP	Isaiah
33	FW	ESP	Miguel Puche
34	DF	ESP	Ángel López
35	GK	ESP	Miguel Ángel Sanz

No.	Pos.	Nation	Player
37	DF	ESP	Luismi Luengo
38	MF	ESP	Alberto Vaquero
39	FW	ESP	Raúl Rubio
40	GK	ESP	Carlos Calavia
41	GK	ESP	Guillermo Acín

=== Out on loan ===
Note: Flags indicate national team as defined under FIFA eligibility rules; some limited exceptions apply. Players may hold more than one non-FIFA nationality.

No.	Pos.	Nation	Player
—	GK	ESP	Carlos Azón (at Tarazona until 30 June 2022)
—	DF	ESP	Alejandro Escuín (at Ejea until 30 June 2022)
—	DF	ESP	Enrique Clemente (at Real Sociedad B until 30 June 2022)
—	MF	GEQ	Federico Bikoro (at Hércules until 30 June 2022)
—	MF	GEQ	Jannick Buyla (at Gimnàstic until 30 June 2022)
—	MF	ESP	Javi Ros (at Amorebieta until 30 June 2022)
—	MF	ESP	Marc Aguado (at Andorra until 30 June 2022)

No.	Pos.	Nation	Player
—	FW	ESP	Alejandro Jay (at Tarazona until 30 June 2022)
—	MF	NGR	James Igbekeme (at Columbus Crew until 31 December 2022)
—	FW	SLO	Haris Vučkić (at Rijeka until 30 June 2022)
—	FW	ESP	Gaizka Larrazabal (at Amorebieta until 30 June 2022)
—	FW	ESP	Jaime Sancho (at Calvo Sotelo Puertollano until 30 June 2022)
—	FW	ESP	Marcos Cuenca (at Brea until 30 June 2022)
—	FW	ESP	Marcos Baselga (at Zamora until 30 June 2022)

== Pre-season and friendlies ==
Win Draw Loss Fixtures

17 July 2021 Friendly	Teruel	Cancelled	Zaragoza	Teruel, Spain
19:30 CEST (UTC+2)				Stadium: Estadio La Pinila

20 July 2021 Friendly	Calahorra	2–0	Zaragoza	Calahorra, Spain
19:30 CEST (UTC+2)				Stadium: Estadio La Planilla

24 July 2021 Friendly	Elche	0–2	Zaragoza	San Pedro del Pinatar, Spain
21:00 CEST (UTC+2)			Narváez 24'; Adrián 78'	Stadium: Pinatar Arena Football Center; Attendance: 0

28 July 2021 Friendly	Valencia	0–2	Zaragoza	San Pedro del Pinatar, Spain
18:45 CEST (UTC+2)			Narváez 19'; Gámez 44'	Stadium: Pinatar Arena Football Center; Attendance: 0 Referee: Pedro Campoy Candela

30 July 2021 Friendly	Zaragoza	1–1	Atromitos	San Pedro del Pinatar, Spain
19:00 CEST (UTC+2)	Gámez 39'		Oikonomidis 86'	Stadium: Pinatar Arena Football Center; Attendance: 0

4 August 2021 Trofeo Carlos Lapetra	Zaragoza	0–0 (5–6 p)	Getafe	Zaragoza, Spain
21:00 CEST (UTC+2)				Stadium: La Romareda; Referee: Víctor García Verdura
	Penalties
	Adrián (penalty scored); Francés (penalty missed); Carbonell (penalty scored); Serrano (penalty scored); Nieto (penalty scored); Clemente (penalty missed); Puche (penalty missed); Cortés (penalty scored); López (penalty missed)		(penalty scored) Timor; (penalty scored) Miquel; (penalty scored) Ramírez; (penalty scored) Duro; (penalty missed) Niang; (penalty missed) Josete; (penalty missed) Cabaco; (penalty scored) Iglesias; (penalty scored) Chema

== Competitions ==
=== Overall record ===
Competition	First match	Last match	Starting round	Final position	Record							
Competition	First match	Last match	Starting round	Final position	Pld	W	D	L	GF	GA	GD	Win %
Segunda División	13 August 2021	27 May 2022	Matchday 1	10th	42	12	20	10	39	46	−7	28.57
Copa del Rey	1 December 2021	6 January 2022	First round	Round of 32	3	2	0	1	3	2	+1	66.67
Total					45	14	20	11	42	48	−6	31.11

Source: Soccerway

=== Segunda División ===
==== League table ====
Pos	Team	Pld	W	D	L	GF	GA	GD	Pts
8	Ponferradina	42	17	12	13	57	55	+2	63
9	Cartagena	42	18	6	18	63	57	+6	60
10	Zaragoza	42	12	20	10	39	46	−7	56
11	Burgos	42	15	10	17	41	41	0	55
12	Leganés	42	13	15	14	50	51	−1	54 (Note: Leganés finished ahead of Huesca on head-to-head points: Leganés 2–1 Huesca, Huesca 0–2 Leganés.)

Source: LaLiga SmartBank
Rules for classification: 1) points; 2) head-to-head points; 3) head-to-head goal difference; 4) goal difference; 5) number of goals scored

==== Results summary ====
Overall								Home						Away					
Pld	W	D	L	GF	GA	GD	Pts	W	D	L	GF	GA	GD	W	D	L	GF	GA	GD
42	12	20	10	39	46	−7	56	7	10	4	16	15	+1	5	10	6	23	31	−8

Source: La Liga SmartBank

==== Results by round ====
Round	1	2	3	4	5	6	7	8	9	10	11	12	13	14	15	16	17	18	19	20	21	22	23	24	25	26	27	28	29	30	31	32	33	34	35	36	37	38	39	40	41	42
Ground	H	A	H	A	A	H	A	H	H	A	H	A	H	A	H	A	H	A	H	A	H	A	A	H	A	H	A	H	A	H	H	A	H	A	H	A	H	A	H	A	H	A
Result	D	L	L	W	D	D	D	D	D	D	D	D	D	W	W	W	L	D	W	L	L	L	D	D	D	D	L	W	W	W	W	L	D	D	W	D	D	L	L	D	W	W
Position	13	18	21	17	18	19	18	20	19	18	19	19	19	17	12	11	13	13	11	13	15	17	16	16	18	18	18	16	15	14	11	14	13	14	11	12	12	14	14	14	13	10

Source: La Liga SmartBank
A = Away; H = Home; W = Win; D = Draw; L = Loss

==== Matches ====
The league fixtures were announced on 30 June 2021.

13 August 2021 1	Zaragoza	0–0	Ibiza	Zaragoza
22:00 CEST (UTC+2)		Report		Stadium: La Romareda; Referee: Iosu Galech Apezteguía

20 August 2021 2	Valladolid	2–0	Zaragoza	Valladolid
20:00 CEST (UTC+2)	Sánchez 17'; Toni 90'	Report		Stadium: José Zorrilla; Attendance: 10,080; Referee: Eduardo Prieto Iglesias

30 August 2021 3	Zaragoza	0–1	Cartagena	Zaragoza
22:00 CEST (UTC+2)		Report	Gámez 71' (o.g.)	Stadium: La Romareda; Attendance: 10,704; Referee: Saúl Ais Reig

5 September 2021 4	Alcorcón	1–2	Zaragoza	Alcorcón
18:15 CEST (UTC+2)	Moyano 20'	Report	Eguaras 56'; Vada 84'	Stadium: Santo Domingo; Referee: Rubén Ávalos Barrera

12 September 2021 5	Fuenlabrada	1–1	Zaragoza	Fuenlabrada
20:30 CEST (UTC+2)	Anderson 25'	Report	Vada 72' (pen.)	Stadium: Fernando Torres; Referee: Aitor Gorostegui Fernández-Ortega

18 September 2021 6	Zaragoza	1–1	Real Sociedad B	Zaragoza
18:15 CEST (UTC+2)				Stadium: La Romareda

26 September 2021 7	Lugo	1–1	Zaragoza	Lugo
20:30 CEST (UTC+2)	Chris Ramos 28'; Xavi Torres (yellow card) 69'	Report	Borja Sainz 32' (pen.); Nano (yellow card) 63'	Stadium: Anxo Carro; Attendance: 2,135; Referee: Víctor García

2 October 2021 8	Zaragoza	0–0	Real Oviedo	Zaragoza
18:15 CEST (UTC+2)	Íñigo Eguaras (yellow card) 19'; Narváez (yellow card) 88'	Report	Dani Calvo (yellow card) 36'; Jimmy Suárez (yellow card) 54'; Mossa (yellow card) 58'; Brugman (yellow card) 80'; Matheus Aiás (yellow card) 85'; David Costas (yellow card) 88'	Stadium: La Romareda; Attendance: 16,889; Referee: Luis Milla

11 October 2021 9	Zaragoza	0–0	Huesca	Zaragoza
21:00 CEST (UTC+2)	Sergio Bermejo (yellow card) 45'; Alberto Zapater (yellow card) 90'	Report	Miguel (yellow card) 23'; Dani Escriche (yellow card) 34'; Pitta (yellow card) 84'	Stadium: La Romareda; Attendance: 25,307; Referee: Francisco Hernández

16 October 2021 10	Málaga	1–1	Zaragoza	Málaga
20:30 CEST (UTC+2)	Genaro Rodríguez (yellow card) 21'; Javi Jiménez (yellow card) 25'; Brandon Thomas 28'; Jairo Samperio (yellow card) 70'	Report	Vada (yellow card) 37'; Narváez 44' (yellow card) 58'; Borja Sainz (yellow card) 82'; Petrović (yellow card) 88'	Stadium: La Rosaleda Stadium; Attendance: 15,901; Referee: Jon González

21 October 2021 11	Zaragoza	1–1	Ponferradina	Zaragoza
19:00 CEST (UTC+2)	Íñigo Eguaras (yellow card) 3'; Jair Amador (yellow card) 45+1'; Vada 77' (pen.); Petrović (yellow card) 81'; Alejandro Francés (yellow card) 90+3'	Report	Pașcanu (yellow card) 24'; Cristian Rodríguez 47'; Copete (yellow card) 52'; Ricard Pujol (yellow card) 72'; José María Amo (yellow card) 74'	Stadium: La Romareda; Attendance: 15,676; Referee: Aitor Gorostegui

25 October 2021 12	Girona	1–1	Zaragoza	Girona
21:00 CEST (UTC+2)	Stuani 87' (yellow card) 90+8'; Álex Baena (yellow card) 90+6'; Samuel Sáiz (yellow card) 90+7'	Report	Lluís López (yellow card) 54'; Vada 71'; Fran Gámez (yellow card) 90'	Stadium: Estadi Montilivi; Attendance: 5,162; Referee: Raúl Martín González Francés

31 October 2021 13	Zaragoza	1–1	Mirandés	Zaragoza
20:30 CEST (UTC+2)	Nano 1' (yellow card) 15'; Pep Chavarría (yellow card) 29'; Alejandro Francés (yellow card) 63'; Petrović (yellow card) 87'	Report	Iñigo Vicente (yellow card) 15'; Brugui 90+5'	Stadium: La Romareda; Attendance: 13,802; Referee: Gorka Sagues Oscoz

4 November 2021 14	Burgos	0–1	Zaragoza	Burgos
19:00 CET	Míchel Zabaco (yellow card) 5'; Miki Muñoz (yellow card) 90+4'	Report	Lluís López (yellow card) 66'; Álvaro Giménez 83' (yellow card) 83'; Fran Gámez (yellow card) 90+2'	Stadium: Estadio El Plantío; Attendance: 9,584; Referee: Daniel Jesús Trujillo Suárez

7 November 2021 15	Zaragoza	2–0	Sporting Gijón	Zaragoza
16:00 CET	Borja Sainz 30'; Petrović (yellow card) 45+1'; Nano (yellow card) 59' (goal) 62'; Jair Amador (yellow card) 80'; Fran Gámez (yellow card) 88'	Report	Gaspar Campos (yellow card) 26'; Đurđević (yellow card) 68'; Pedro Díaz (yellow card) 77'	Stadium: La Romareda; Attendance: 18,100; Referee: Javier Iglesias Villanueva

13 November 2021 16	Las Palmas	2–3	Zaragoza	Las Palmas
20:30 CET (UTC+1)	Jonathan Viera 23' (yellow card) 90+4'; Benito Ramírez 67'; Álex Suárez (yellow card) 90+1'	Report	Sergio Bermejo 33'; Álvaro Giménez 54' 75'; Lluís López (yellow card) 69'; Fran Gámez (yellow card) 82'	Stadium: Estadio Gran Canaria; Attendance: 13,432; Referee: Álvaro Moreno Aragón

22 November 2021 17	Zaragoza	0–2	Leganés	Zaragoza
21:00 CET (UTC+1)	Sergio Bermejo (yellow card) 43'; Alejandro Francés (yellow card) 49'; Íñigo Eguaras (yellow card) 56'	Report	Ranđelović 15'; Javi Hernández (yellow card) 36'; José Arnaiz (yellow card) 49'; Recio (yellow card) 62'; Shibasaki 65'	Stadium: La Romareda; Attendance: 10,426; Referee: Dámaso Arcediano Monescillo

28 November 2021 18	Amorebieta	1–1	Zaragoza	Lezama
16:00 CET (UTC+1)	Jair Amador 24' (o.g.); Aitor Aldalur (yellow card) 29'; Óscar Gil (yellow card) 54'; Iñigo Orozco (red card) 68'; Iker Bilbao (yellow card) 87'; Gorka Larrucea (yellow card) 89'; Gorka Guruzeta (yellow card) 90+4'	Report	Álvaro Giménez 18'; Jair Amador (yellow card) 71'; Igbekeme (yellow card) 90+1'	Stadium: Lezama Facilities; Attendance: 1,250; Referee: Oliver De La Fuente

6 December 2021 19	Zaragoza	1–0	Eibar	Zaragoza
16:00 CET (UTC+1)	Alejandro Francés 60'	Report	Toño (yellow card) 31'; Stoichkov (yellow card) 63'	Stadium: La Romareda; Attendance: 16,109; Referee: Javier Iglesias Villanueva

11 December 2021 20	Almería	3–0	Zaragoza	Almería
18:15 CET (UTC+1)	Samú Costa (yellow card) 37'; Babić (yellow card) 58'; Sadiq 61'; Alejandro Pozo 86'; Ramazani 90+1'	Report		Stadium: Estadio de los Juegos Mediterráneos; Attendance: 9,258; Referee: Francisco Hernández Maeso

19 December 2021 21	Zaragoza	0–2	Tenerife	Zaragoza
16:00 CET (UTC+1)	Petrović (yellow card) 37'; Borja Sainz (yellow card) 50'	Report	Elady Zorrilla 20'; Víctor Mollejo 28' (yellow card) 37'; Carlos Pomares (yellow card) 66'; Mellot (yellow card) 88'	Stadium: La Romareda; Attendance: 15,283; Referee: Alejandro Quintero González

2 January 2022 22	Mirandés	2–0	Zaragoza	Miranda de Ebro
18:15 CET (UTC+1)	Alejandro Marqués 14' 79'; Víctor Sanchís (yellow card) 21'; César Gelabert (yellow card) 25'; Capellini (yellow card) 39'; Iago López (yellow card) 47'; Arroyo (yellow card) 69'	Report	Francho Serrano (yellow card) 12'; Vada (red card) 38'; Enrique Clemente (yellow card) 72'; Alejandro Francés (yellow card) 83'	Stadium: Estadio Municipal de Anduva; Attendance: 3,076; Referee: Luis Milla Alvendiz

9 January 2022 23	Ponferradina	0–0	Zaragoza	Ponferrada
20:30 CET (UTC+1)	José María Amo (yellow card) 29'; Dani Ojeda (yellow card) 57'; Agus Medina (yellow card) 88'	Report	Borja Sainz (yellow card) 75'	Stadium: Estadio El Toralín; Attendance: 3,282; Referee: Iosu Galech Apezteguía

22 January 2022 24	Zaragoza	0–0	Real Valladolid	Zaragoza
16:00 CET (UTC+1)	Pep Chavarría (yellow card) 44'; Nano (yellow card) 55'	Report	Nacho (yellow card) 74'; Plata (red card) 84'; Roque Mesa (yellow card) 85'	Stadium: La Romareda; Attendance: 14,795; Referee: Jon González Esteban

31 January 2022 25	Ibiza	2–2	Zaragoza	Ibiza
21:00 CET (UTC+1)	Cifu (yellow card) 22'; David Goldar (yellow card) 30'; Juan Ibiza (yellow card) 40'; Sergio Castel 61' 65'; Diop (yellow card) 76'	Report	Francho Serrano 15'; Iván Azón (yellow card) 21'; Petrović 24'; Vada (yellow card) 70'	Stadium: Estadi Municipal de Can Misses; Attendance: 4,678; Referee: Saúl Ais Reig

5 February 2022 26	Zaragoza	1–1	Málaga	Zaragoza
18:15 CET (UTC+1)	Eugeni Valderrama 64' (pen.); Petrović (yellow card) 83'	Report	Antoñín 26'; Cufré (yellow card) 62'; Alberto Escassi (yellow card) 70'	Stadium: La Romareda; Attendance: 16,178; Referee: Francisco Hernández Maeso

11 February 2022 27	Leganés	2–1	Zaragoza	Leganés
21:00 CET (UTC+1)	Nyom (yellow card) 27'; Omeruo (yellow card) 33'; Javi Hernández (yellow card) 46'; Cissé 51'; José Arnaiz 76'	Report	Petrović (yellow card) 65'; Iván Azón 89'	Stadium: Estadio Municipal de Butarque; Attendance: 8,244; Referee: Dámaso Arcediano Monescillo

19 February 2022 28	Zaragoza	2–1	Las Palmas	Zaragoza
16:00 CET (UTC+1)	Jaume Grau 5' (yellow card) 72'; Fran Gámez (yellow card) 10'; Pep Chavarría (yellow card) 43'; Alejandro Francés (yellow card) 63'; Álvaro Giménez 69' (yellow card) 82'	Report	Mfulu (yellow card) 4'; Maikel Mesa (yellow card) 17' (goal) 55'; Eric Curbelo (yellow card) 24'; Sergi Cardona (yellow card) 60'	Stadium: La Romareda; Attendance: 14,898; Referee: Iván Caparrós Hernández

27 February 2022 29	Sporting Gijón	1–2	Zaragoza	Gijón
16:00 CET (UTC+1)	Juan Berrocal (yellow card) 71'; Ramírez (yellow card) 90'; Nacho Méndez (yellow card) 90+2'; Đurđević 90+4' (yellow card) 90+7'; Borja López (yellow card) 90+7'	Report	Jaume Grau 25' (yellow card) 90+7'; Jair Amador (yellow card) 45+1'; Sabin Merino (yellow card) 46'; Vada (yellow card) 77'; Iván Azón 90+6'	Stadium: El Molinón; Attendance: 15,470; Referee: Jon González Esteban

4 March 2022 30	Zaragoza	2–0	Almería	Zaragoza
21:00 CET (UTC+1)	Álvarez (yellow card) 8'; Francho Serrano 13'; Iván Azón 79'	Report		Stadium: La Romareda; Attendance: 14,000; Referee: Daniel Trujillo Suárez

11 March 2022 31	Zaragoza	2–1	Fuenlabrada	Zaragoza
21:00 CET (UTC+1)	Narváez (yellow card) 37'; Iván Azón 54'; Miguel Puche 75'; Alejandro Francés (yellow card) 86'	Report	Bouldini (yellow card) 27'; Pedro León (yellow card) 30'; Jair Amador 32' (o.g.); Javier Ontiveros (yellow card) 37'; Sotillos (yellow card) 53'; Adrián Diéguez (yellow card) 84'	Stadium: La Romareda; Attendance: 16,317; Referee: Eduardo Prieto Iglesias

19 March 2022 32	FC Cartagena	3–0	Zaragoza	Cartagena
16:00 CET (UTC+1)	Delmás 34'; Rubén Castro (yellow card) 44'; Dauda 51'; Bodiger 68'; Datković (yellow card) 84'	Report	Álvaro Giménez (yellow card) 40'; Vada (yellow card) 46'; Iván Azón (yellow card) 89'	Stadium: Estadio Cartagonova; Attendance: 7,056; Referee: José López Toca

25 March 2022 33	Zaragoza	1–1	Amorebieta	Zaragoza
21:00 CET (UTC+1)	vada (yellow card) 90+3'; Iván Azón 90+7'	Report	Iker Seguín (yellow card) 29'; Jon Irazabal (yellow card) 44'; Óscar Gil (yellow card) 64' (goal) 78'; Peru Nolaskoain (yellow card) 89'; Koldo Obieta (yellow card) 90'	Stadium: La Romareda; Attendance: 15,556; Referee: Rubén Ávalos Barrera

2 April 2022 34	Tenerife	1–1	Zaragoza	Santa Cruz de Tenerife
19:30 WEST (UTC+1)	Shashoua 22'; Juan Soriano (yellow card) 73'	Report	Vada 15'; Sergio Bermejo (yellow card) 68'	Stadium: Heliodoro Rodríguez López; Attendance: 12,050; Referee: David Gálvez Rascón

10 April 2022 35	Zaragoza	1–0	Girona	Zaragoza
--:-- CEST (UTC+2)				Stadium: La Romareda

17 April 2022 36	Huesca	1–1	Zaragoza	Huesca
18:15 CEST (UTC+2)	Seoane 31'		Azón 38'	Stadium: El Alcoraz; Referee: Jon Ander González Esteban

24 April 2022 37	Zaragoza	0–0	Burgos	Zaragoza
18:30 CEST (UTC+2)				Stadium: La Romareda; Referee: José Antonio López Toca

30 April 2022 38	Eibar	2–0	Zaragoza	Eibar
18:15 CEST (UTC+2)	Stoichkov 51'; Antonio Glauder (yellow card) 59'; Lluís López 60' (o.g.)	Report	Alejandro Francés (yellow card) 43'	Stadium: Ipurua; Attendance: 5,973; Referee: Daniel Jesús Trujillo Suárez

8 May 2022 39	Zaragoza	0–3	Alcorcón	Zaragoza
18:15 CEST (UTC+2)			Apeh 45+2'; Calero 62'; Arribas 79'	Stadium: La Romareda; Referee: Gorka Sagués Oscoz

16 May 2022 40	Oviedo	3–3	Zaragoza	Oviedo
21:00 CEST (UTC+2)	Bastón 14' (pen.); Obeng 26'; Brugman 48'		Bermejo 17', 33'; Amador 20'	Stadium: Carlos Tartiere; Referee: Oliver de la Fuente Ramos

20 May 2022 41	Zaragoza	1–0	Lugo	Zaragoza
21:00 CEST (UTC+2)	Vada 74'		Torres (red card) 59'	Stadium: La Romareda; Referee: Álvaro Moreno Aragón

27 May 2022 42	Real Sociedad B	1–2	Zaragoza	San Sebastián
21:00 CEST (UTC+2)	Aldasoro (yellow card) 10'; Martín 66'; Sola (yellow card) 82'	Report	Ivan 1'; Vada 41'	Stadium: Anoeta; Attendance: 2,622; Referee: Rafael Sánchez López

=== Copa del Rey ===
1 December 2021 First round	Mensajero	0–1	Zaragoza	Santa Cruz de La Palma
15:30 WET (UTC±0)		Report	Clemente 80'	Stadium: Silvestre Carrillo; Referee: Gorka Sagués Oscoz

14 December 2021 Second round	Zaragoza	2–0	Burgos	Zaragoza
20:00 CET (UTC+1)	Eguaras 34'; González 51'	Report		Stadium: La Romareda; Referee: Aitor Gorostegui Fernández-Ortega

6 January 2022 Round of 32	Zaragoza	0–2	Sevilla	Zaragoza
18:00 CET (UTC+1)	Narváez (yellow card) 54'; Petrović (yellow card) 73'	Report	Koundé 31'; Diego Carlos (yellow card) 52'; Gudelj (yellow card) 60'; Mir 69'	Stadium: La Romareda; Referee: Valentín Pizarro Gómez
