= 2024–25 Real Zaragoza season =

Real Zaragoza
2024–25 season
- Head coach: Víctor Fernández (until 18 December); Miguel Ángel Ramírez (27 December–16 March)
- Stadium: La Romareda
- Segunda División: 18th
- Copa del Rey: First round
- Top goalscorer: League: Mario Soberón (5); All: Mario Soberón (5)
- Average home league attendance: 18,748
- Biggest win: Cádiz 0–4 Zaragoza
Home colours	Away colours	Third colours

The 2024–25 season is the 93rd season in the history of the Real Zaragoza, and the club's 12th consecutive season in Segunda División. In addition to the domestic league, the team is scheduled to participate in the Copa del Rey.

== Friendlies ==
=== Pre-season ===
24 July 2024 Friendly	Calahorra	0–2	Zaragoza	Calahorra
19:00			Iván Azón 3'; Soberón 84'	Stadium: La Plantilla; Attendance: 1,000; Referee: Millán Bárcenas

27 July 2024 Friendly	Tarazona	0–1	Zaragoza

31 July 2024 Friendly	Getafe	0–1	Zaragoza

3 August 2024 Friendly	Elche	0–1	Zaragoza

7 August 2024 Friendly	Gimnàstic de Tarragona	0–1	Zaragoza

9 August 2024 Friendly	Levante	1–0	Zaragoza

== Competitions ==
=== Overall record ===
Competition	First match	Last match	Starting round	Record							
Competition	First match	Last match	Starting round	Pld	W	D	L	GF	GA	GD	Win %
Segunda División	16 August 2024	1 June 2025	Matchday 1	6	4	1	1	11	3	+8	66.67
Copa del Rey			First round	0	0	0	0	0	0	+0	—
Total				6	4	1	1	11	3	+8	66.67

Last updated: 21 September 2024
Source: Soccerway

=== Segunda División ===
==== League table ====
Pos	Team	Pld	W	D	L	GF	GA	GD	Pts	Qualification or relegation
16	Málaga	42	12	17	13	42	46	−4	53 (Note: Deportivo La Coruña finished ahead of Málaga and Castellón on head-to-head points: Deportivo La Coruña 6 pts, Málaga 5 pts, Castellón 4 pts.)	
17	Castellón	42	14	11	17	65	63	+2	53	
18	Zaragoza	42	13	12	17	56	63	−7	51	
19	Eldense (R)	42	11	12	19	44	63	−19	45	Relegation to Primera Federación
20	Tenerife (R)	42	8	12	22	35	55	−20	36	Relegation to Primera Federación

Source: LaLiga Hypermotion
Rules for classification: 1) Points; 2) Head-to-head points; 3) Head-to-head goal difference; 4) Goal difference; 5) Goals scored; 6) Fair-play points
(Note: Head-to-head record is used only after all the matches between the teams in question have been played)
(R) Relegated

==== Results summary ====
Overall								Home						Away					
Pld	W	D	L	GF	GA	GD	Pts	W	D	L	GF	GA	GD	W	D	L	GF	GA	GD
27	9	7	11	36	33	+3	34	4	3	6	16	16	0	5	4	5	20	17	+3

Last updated: 16 February 2025.
Source: soccerway

==== Results by round ====
Round	1	2	3	4	5	6	7	8	9	10	11	12	13	14	15	16	17	18	19	20	21	22	23	24	25	26	27	28	29
Ground	A	A	A	H	A	H	A	H	A	H	A	H	H	A	H	A	H	A	A	H	H	A	H	A	H	A	H	A	H
Result	W	W	D	W	L	W	L	L	W	L	W	L	W	D	D	D	L	D	L	L	W	L	D	W	D	L	L		
Position	9	3	2	1	5	3	4	6	3	7	4	8	5	5	8	9	10	11	12	13	12	13	13	9	10	13	16		

Updated to match(es) played on 16 February 2025. Source:
A = Away; H = Home; W = Win; D = Draw; L = Loss

==== Matches ====
The match schedule was released on 26 June 2024.

16 August 2024 1	Cádiz	0–4	Zaragoza	Cádiz
21:30			Soberón 14', 43'; Aketxe 84'; Luna 90+1'	Stadium: Nuevo Mirandilla; Referee: Dámaso Arcediano Monescillo

26 August 2024 2	Cartagena	1–2	Zaragoza	Cartagena
19:00				Stadium: Estadio Cartagonova

1 September 2024 3	Mirandés	0–0	Zaragoza	Miranda de Ebro
19:00				Stadium: Anduva

8 September 2024 4	Zaragoza	3–0	Elche	Zaragoza
18:30				Stadium: La Romareda

15 September 2024 5	Burgos	1–0	Zaragoza	Burgos
18:30				Stadium: Estadio El Plantío

21 September 2024 6	Zaragoza	2–1	Levante	Zaragoza
21:00				Stadium: La Romareda

28 September 2024 7	Sporting Gijón	1–0	Zaragoza	Gijón
18:30	Guille Rosas 27'	Report	Baždar (yellow card) 11'; Ager Aketxe (yellow card) 24'; Poussin (yellow card) 28'; Enrique Clemente (red card) 49'; Adu Ares (yellow card) 88'; Lluís López (red card) 90'; Marcos Luna (yellow card) 90+4'	Stadium: El Molinón; Attendance: 22,426; Referee: (Spain) Álvaro Moreno Aragón

5 October 2024 8	Zaragoza	2–3	Racing de Santander	Zaragoza
18:30	Francho Serrano (yellow card) 5'; Bernardo Vital (yellow card) 15'; Dani Tasende 57'; Mario Soberón 66'; Toni Moya (yellow card) 84'	Report	Manu Hernando (yellow card) 3' (yellow-red card) 51'; Pablo Rodríguez 33' (yellow card) 45+2'; Iñigo Vicente 40' (yellow card) 41'; Jokin Ezkieta (yellow card) 63'; Aritz Aldasoro 71'; Javi Montero (yellow card) 90+8'	Stadium: La Romareda; Attendance: 21,341; Referee: (Spain) Miguel Sesma Espinosa

11 October 2024 9	Tenerife	2–3	Zaragoza	Santa Cruz de Tenerife
20:30 CET	Aarón Martín 11'; Sergio González (red card) 24'; José León (yellow card) 37'; Josep Gayá (yellow card) 45+3'; David Rodríguez 50' (yellow card) 70'; Waldo Rubio (yellow card) 90+6'	Report	Dani Tasende (yellow card) 49'; Adu Ares (yellow card) 60'; Baždar 74' 87'; Bernardo Vital (yellow card) 75'; Iván Azón 79'	Stadium: Estadio Heliodoro Rodríguez López; Attendance: 15,155; Referee: (Spain) Salvador Lax Franco

20 October 2024 10	Zaragoza	1–2	Almería	Zaragoza
18:30 CET	Iván Azón 12'; Baždar (yellow card) 56'; Bernardo Vital (yellow card) 83'	Report	Edgar González (yellow card) 1'; Suárez 9' (pen.) 67'; Baba (yellow card) 18'; Chumi (yellow card) 48'; Gonzalo Melero (yellow card) 78'; Lopy (yellow card) 78'; Fernando Martínez (yellow card) 87'	Stadium: La Romareda; Attendance: 20,814; Referee: (Spain) Sergiu Claudiu Muresan

23 October 2024 11	Eldense	2–3	Zaragoza	Elda
19:00 CET	Juanto 11'; Víctor García (yellow card) 45+3'; Younes Lachaab 72'	Report	Baždar 34'; Iván Azón 45+4'; Bare (yellow card) 65'; Iván Calero (yellow card) 75'; Adrián Liso 80'; Kóša (yellow card) 90'	Stadium: Nuevo Pepico Amat; Attendance: 4,158; Referee: (Spain) Dámaso Arcediano Monescillo

26 October 2024 12	Zaragoza	1–2	Castellón	Zaragoza
18:30 CET	Adrián Liso 8'; Iván Azón (yellow card) 26'; Enrique Clemente (yellow card) 53'; Lluís López (yellow card) 71'	Report	Alberto Jiménez 1' (yellow card) 40'; Óscar Gil (yellow card) 4'; Willems (yellow card) 45+1'; Israel Suero 76' (yellow card) 85'	Stadium: La Romareda; Attendance: 20,017; Referee: (Spain) Manuel Orellana Cid

2 November 2024 13	Zaragoza	2–1	Granada	Zaragoza
18:30 CET	Iván Azón 1' 63'; Lluís López (yellow card) 24'; Bernardo Vital (yellow card) 57'; Poussin (yellow card) 85'	Report	Ignasi Miquel (yellow card) 7'; Rubén Sánchez (yellow card) 71' (yellow-red card) 90+4'; Uzuni 84'; Jóźwiak (red card) 85'	Stadium: La Romareda; Attendance: 17,642; Referee: (Spain) Saúl Ais Reig

9 November 2024 14	Huesca	1–1	Zaragoza	Huesca
18:30 CET	Gerard Valentín 24'; Miguel Loureiro (yellow card) 52'; Javi Hernández (yellow card) 55'; Rubén Pulido (yellow card) 63'	Report	Iván Azón 64'; Iván Calero (yellow card) 72'	Stadium: Estadio El Alcoraz; Attendance: 6,895; Referee: (Spain) Jon González Esteban

17 November 2024 15	Zaragoza	0–0	Málaga	Zaragoza
21:00 CET	Adu Ares (yellow card) 19'; Francho Serrano (yellow card) 63'; Marcos Luna (yellow card) 74'; Iván Calero (yellow card) 90+3'	Report	David Larrubia (yellow card) 15'; Luismi (yellow card) 35'; Kevin (red card) 35'; Víctor García (yellow card) 45+1'; Dani Sánchez (yellow card) 59'	Stadium: La Romareda; Attendance: 18,054; Referee: (Spain) Salvador Lax Franco

23 November 2024 16	Córdoba	2–2	Zaragoza	Córdoba
18:30 CET	Adrián Lapeña (yellow card) 14'; Zidane 30'; Jacobo González 58' (yellow card) 90+3'; Álex Sala (yellow card) 64'; Antonio Casas (yellow card) 67'; Isma Ruiz (yellow card) 72'	Report	Bare (yellow card) 11'; Francho Serrano 16'; Ager Aketxe (yellow card) 47'; Marcos Luna 56'; Dani Tasende (yellow card) 69'; Baždar (yellow card) 72'	Stadium: Estadio Nuevo Arcángel; Attendance: 18,189; Referee: (Spain) Álvaro Moreno Aragón

30 November 2024 17	Zaragoza	0–1	Albacete	Zaragoza
16:15 CET	Lluís López (yellow card) 55'; Dani Tasende (yellow card) 73'; Marcos Luna (yellow card) 90'	Report	Javi Rueda (yellow card) 47'; Alberto Quiles 75' (pen.)	Stadium: La Romareda; Attendance: 18,014; Referee: (Spain) José Luis Guzmán Mansilla

7 December 2024 18	Deportivo La Coruña	1–1	Zaragoza	La Coruña
18:30 CET	Mario Soriano 7' (yellow card) 8'; Martinez (yellow card) 67'; Mfulu (yellow card) 74'; Helton Leite (yellow card) 88'; Lucas Pérez (yellow card) 89'	Report	Bare (yellow card) 20'; Jair Amador (yellow card) 34'; Marc Aguado (yellow card) 65'; Francho Serrano 90+2'	Stadium: Estadio Riazor; Attendance: 24,257; Referee: (Spain) Oliver De la Fuente Ramos

14 December 2024 19	Eibar	2–1	Zaragoza	Eibar
18:30 CET	Antonio Puertas 21' (yellow card) 69'; Ander Madariaga 53'; Chema (yellow card) 61'; Matheus Pereira (yellow card) 63'	Report	Malcom Adu Ares (yellow card) 25'; Jair Amador (yellow card) 36'; Adrián Liso 80'; Pau Sans (yellow card) 80'; Iván Calero (yellow card) 82'	Stadium: Ipurua Municipal Stadium; Attendance: 4,779; Referee: (Spain) Sergiu Claudiu Muresan

17 December 2024 20	Zaragoza	2–3	Real Oviedo	Zaragoza
21:15 CET	Adrián Liso 21'; Bare (yellow card) 25'; Malcom Adu Ares (yellow card) 28' (goal) 32'; Bernardo Vital (yellow card) 76'	Report	Lucas Ahijado (yellow card) 37'; Alberto del Moral (yellow card) 37'; Sebas Moyano (yellow card) 48'; Chaira 50' 90+2'; Braat (yellow card) 51'; Álex Cardero (yellow card) 61'; Alemão 65'	Stadium: La Romareda; Attendance: 12,813; Referee: (Spain) Manuel Pérez Hernández

21 December 2024 21	Zaragoza	1–0	Racing de Ferrol	Zaragoza
18:30 CET	Iván Azón (yellow card) 8'; Ager Aketxe 63'; Bernardo Vital (yellow card) 65'; Dani Tasende (yellow card) 90+2'	Report	Naldo (yellow card) 34'; Aitor Gelardo (yellow card) 87'; Rober Correa (red card) 90+2'	Stadium: La Romareda; Attendance: 17,005; Referee: (Spain) Daniel Palencia Caballero

12 January 2025 22	Elche	1–0	Zaragoza	Elche
16:15 CET	Josan (yellow card) 39'; Álvaro Núñez (yellow card) 51'; Fernández (yellow card) 75'; Mourad Daoudi (yellow card) 80'; Rashani 90+3' (yellow card) 90+4'	Report	Marc Aguado (yellow card) 4'; Dani Tasende (yellow card) 21'; Adrián Liso (yellow card) 26'; Enrique Clemente (yellow card) 72'; Alberto Marí (yellow card) 90+2'	Stadium: Estadio Martínez Valero; Attendance: 20,081; Referee: (Spain) Rafael Sánchez López

19 January 2025 23	Zaragoza	2–2	Tenerife	Zaragoza
18:30 CET	Carlos Nieto (yellow card) 72'; Enrique Clemente 77'; Iván Azón 78'; Baždar (yellow card) 90+4'	Report	Bodiger (yellow card) 29'; Waldo Rubio 39'; Aitor Sanz (yellow card) 52'; Alejandro Cantero (yellow card) 61'; Diarra 69'; Josep Gayá (yellow card) 90+1'	Stadium: La Romareda; Attendance: 18,509; Referee: (Spain) Andrés Fuentes Molina

26 January 2025 24	Málaga	1–2	Zaragoza	Málaga
18:30 CET	Dioni 49'; Dani Sánchez (yellow card) 53'; Luismi (yellow card) 90'	Report	Lluís López (yellow card) 21'; Dani Tasende 54'; Pau Sans 73'; Ager Aketxe (yellow card) 75'; Bernardo Vital (yellow card) 86'	Stadium: La Rosaleda Stadium; Attendance: 26,531; Referee: (Spain) Oliver De la Fuente Ramos

2 February 2025 25	Zaragoza	0–0	Cádiz	Zaragoza
18:30 CET	Dani Tasende (yellow card) 15' (yellow-red card) 88'; Bernardo Vital (yellow card) 45+1'; Enrique Clemente (yellow card) 51'; Jair Amador (yellow card) 68'; Alberto Marí (yellow card) 90+5'	Report	Carlos Fernández (yellow card) 39'; Isaac Carcelén (yellow card) 83'; Ocampo (yellow card) 90+4'	Stadium: La Romareda; Attendance: 19,555; Referee: (Spain) Jon González Esteban

=== Copa del Rey ===
29 October 2024 First Round	L'Hospitalet	1-5	Zaragoza	L'Hospitalet de Llobregat
21:00 CET	Sanku Jabbie 15' (yellow card) 41'; Ton Alcover (yellow card) 28'	Report	Alberto Marí 12'; Marc Aguado (yellow card) 20'; Marcos Luna (yellow card) 25'; Jair Amador 45+1'; Iván Azón 76'; Pau Sans 79'; Adu Ares 84'	Stadium: Estadi Municipal de Futbol de L'Hospitalet; Attendance: 6,740; Referee: (Spain) Andrés Fuentes Molina

3 December 2024 Second Round	Zaragoza	2-2 (a.e.t.) (4–5 p)	Granada	Zaragoza
21:00 CET	Alberto Marí (yellow card) 17'; Adu Ares 18' 45+3'; Pau Sans (yellow card) 40'; Dani Tasende (yellow card) 45+2'; Aitor Mañas (yellow card) 90+2'; Iván Calero (yellow card) 109'; Bare (yellow card) 109'	Report	Lucas Pérez (yellow card) 35'; Loïc Williams (yellow card) 40'; Weissman 42' (yellow card) 109'; Enrique Clemente 45' (o.g.); Miguel Rubio (yellow card) 98'; Sergio Ruiz (yellow card) 120'	Stadium: La Romareda; Attendance: 10,153; Referee: (Spain) Germán Cid Camacho
