= 2018–19 División de Honor Juvenil de Fútbol =

División de Honor Juvenil de Fútbol
- Season: 2018–19

The 2018–19 División de Honor Juvenil de Fútbol season is the 33rd since its establishment.

== Competition format ==
- The champion of each group and the best runner-up will play in the 2019 Copa de Campeones and the Copa del Rey.
- The other six runners-up and the two best third-placed teams qualify for the Copa del Rey.
- In each group, at least four teams (thirteenth placed on down) will be relegated to Liga Nacional.
- The champion of the Copa de Campeones will get a place for the 2019–20 UEFA Youth League.

== League tables ==
=== Group 1 ===
Pos	Team	Pld	W	D	L	GF	GA	GD	Pts	Qualification or relegation
1	Celta Vigo	30	26	2	2	78	24	+54	80	Qualification to Copa de Campeones
2	Sporting Gijón	30	22	6	2	92	22	+70	72	Qualification to Copa del Rey
3	Racing Santander	30	20	5	5	75	29	+46	65	Qualification to Copa del Rey
4	Ural	30	17	3	10	57	50	+7	54	
5	Deportivo La Coruña	30	16	5	9	63	34	+29	53	
6	Lugo	30	15	5	10	52	37	+15	50	
7	Oviedo	30	14	7	9	45	26	+19	49	
8	Bansander	30	11	4	15	45	58	−13	37	
9	Atlético Perines	30	10	6	14	46	61	−15	36	
10	Racing Ferrol	30	9	8	13	40	55	−15	35	
11	Val Miñor	30	9	6	15	36	46	−10	33 (Note: Val Miñor is ahead of Roces on head-to-head goal differential: Val Miñor–Roces 3–1, Roces–Val Miñor 1–0)	
12	Roces	30	10	3	17	46	66	−20	33	
13	Pontevedra	30	9	2	19	35	62	−27	29	Relegation to Liga Nacional
14	Covadonga	30	5	8	17	30	62	−32	23	Relegation to Liga Nacional
15	Colindres	30	4	6	20	23	75	−52	18	Relegation to Liga Nacional
16	Alondras	30	3	4	23	20	76	−56	13	Relegation to Liga Nacional

Source: RFEF
Rules for classification: 1) Points; 2) Goal difference; 3) Number of goals scored

=== Group 2 ===
Pos	Team	Pld	W	D	L	GF	GA	GD	Pts	Qualification or relegation
1	Numancia	30	20	6	4	74	34	+40	66	Qualification to Copa de Campeones
2	Real Sociedad	30	21	1	8	88	31	+57	64	Qualification to Copa del Rey
3	Alavés	30	16	10	4	69	30	+39	58	
4	Txantrea	30	15	10	5	57	35	+22	55	
5	Danok Bat	30	16	6	8	53	34	+19	54	
6	Eibar	30	15	7	8	52	39	+13	52	
7	Athletic Bilbao	30	14	9	7	70	39	+31	51	
8	Antiguoko	30	12	11	7	42	37	+5	47	
9	Osasuna	30	10	12	8	48	38	+10	42	
10	Pamplona	30	11	8	11	39	48	−9	41	
11	San Juan	30	10	6	14	32	45	−13	36	
12	Valvanera	30	8	6	16	30	45	−15	30	
13	Santutxu	30	6	6	18	33	73	−40	24	Relegation to Liga Nacional
14	Oberena	30	5	6	19	30	77	−47	21	Relegation to Liga Nacional
15	Getxo	30	2	6	22	25	81	−56	12	Relegation to Liga Nacional
16	Amorebieta	30	1	6	23	16	72	−56	9	Relegation to Liga Nacional

Source: RFEF
Rules for classification: 1) Points; 2) Goal difference; 3) Number of goals scored

=== Group 3 ===
Pos	Team	Pld	W	D	L	GF	GA	GD	Pts	Qualification or relegation
1	Zaragoza	30	19	10	1	52	26	+26	67	Qualification to Copa de Campeones
2	Barcelona	30	21	3	6	64	18	+46	66	Qualification to Copa del Rey
3	Espanyol	30	20	5	5	59	25	+34	65	Qualification to Copa del Rey
4	Cornellà	30	13	12	5	36	26	+10	51	
5	Mallorca	30	13	10	7	47	34	+13	49 (Note: Mallorca is ahead of Europa on head-to-head goal differential: Europa–Mallorca 1–0, Mallorca–Europa 3–0)	
6	Europa	30	13	10	7	34	29	+5	49	
7	Girona	30	9	9	12	44	44	0	36	
8	Stadium Casablanca	30	8	10	12	28	44	−16	34 (Note: Stadium Casablanca is ahead of Lleida Esportiu, Gimnàstic Tarragona and San Francisco on head-to-head points: Stadium Casablanca 11 pts, Lleida Esportiu 9 pts, Gimnàstic Tarragona 6 pts, San Francisco 4 pts)	
9	Lleida Esportiu	30	7	13	10	26	31	−5	34	
10	Gimnàstic Tarragona	30	7	13	10	28	36	−8	34	
11	San Francisco	30	8	10	12	34	43	−9	34	
12	Reus	30	6	14	10	21	32	−11	32 (Note: Reus is ahead of Gimnàstic Manresa on head-to-head goal points: Reus–Gimnàstic Manresa 2–1, Gimnàstic Manresa–Reus 1–1)	
13	Gimnàstic Manresa	30	7	11	12	39	34	+5	32	Relegation to Liga Nacional
14	Peña Arrabal	30	6	8	16	23	52	−29	26	Relegation to Liga Nacional
15	Manacor	30	5	6	19	19	53	−34	21	Relegation to Liga Nacional
16	El Olivar	30	2	8	20	22	49	−27	14	Relegation to Liga Nacional

Source: RFEF
Rules for classification: 1) Points; 2) Goal difference; 3) Number of goals scored

=== Group 4 ===
Pos	Team	Pld	W	D	L	GF	GA	GD	Pts	Qualification or relegation
1	Sevilla	34	23	10	1	92	26	+66	79	Qualification to Copa de Campeones
2	Granada	34	23	4	7	64	29	+35	73	Qualification to Copa del Rey
3	Betis	34	23	3	8	82	32	+50	72	
4	Málaga	34	19	7	8	80	35	+45	64	
5	Cádiz	34	15	12	7	38	26	+12	57	
6	Almería	34	15	8	11	58	36	+22	53	
7	San Félix	34	15	7	12	59	43	+16	52	
8	Córdoba	34	14	9	11	43	46	−3	51	
9	Vázquez Cultural	34	14	7	13	57	52	+5	49	
10	Gimnástica Ceuta	34	11	11	12	36	39	−3	44	
11	26 de Febrero	34	9	12	13	42	58	−16	39	
12	Calavera	34	10	8	16	51	56	−5	38	
13	Recreativo	34	10	6	18	32	46	−14	36	
14	La Cañada Atlético	34	9	7	18	34	68	−34	34	Relegation to Liga Nacional
15	Tiro Pichón	34	9	4	21	27	65	−38	31	Relegation to Liga Nacional
16	Tomares	34	8	5	21	36	79	−43	29	Relegation to Liga Nacional
17	Séneca	34	4	13	17	31	62	−31	25	Relegation to Liga Nacional
18	Rusadir	34	6	5	23	37	108	−71	23	Relegation to Liga Nacional

Source: RFEF
Rules for classification: 1) Points; 2) Goal difference; 3) Number of goals scored

=== Group 5 ===
Pos	Team	Pld	W	D	L	GF	GA	GD	Pts	Qualification or relegation
1	Atlético Madrid	30	26	4	0	107	11	+96	82	Qualification to Copa de Campeones
2	Real Madrid	30	25	4	1	94	13	+81	79	Qualification to Copa de Campeones
3	Valladolid	30	20	4	6	60	26	+34	64	
4	Rayo Vallecano	30	20	3	7	60	27	+33	63	
5	Extremadura	30	13	6	11	40	35	+5	45	
6	Leganés	30	10	8	12	43	52	−9	38	
7	Getafe	30	10	7	13	39	54	−15	37	
8	Santa Marta de Tormes	30	11	3	16	33	52	−19	36	
9	Alcorcón	30	10	5	15	34	39	−5	35	
10	Rayo Majadahonda	30	9	7	14	38	47	−9	34 (Note: Rayo Majadahonda is ahead of Aravaca and Unión Adarve on head-to-head points: Rayo Majadahonda 7 pts, Aravaca 5 pts, Unión Adarve 4 pts)	
11	Aravaca	30	9	7	14	31	52	−21	34	
12	Unión Adarve	30	9	7	14	35	46	−11	34	
13	Diocesano	30	9	6	15	45	52	−7	33	Relegation to Liga Nacional
14	Internacional Amistad	30	9	5	16	34	62	−28	32	Relegation to Liga Nacional
15	Canillas	30	3	8	19	28	68	−40	17	Relegation to Liga Nacional
16	Almendralejo	30	4	2	24	18	102	−84	14	Relegation to Liga Nacional

Source: RFEF
Rules for classification: 1) Points; 2) Goal difference; 3) Number of goals scored

=== Group 6 ===
Pos	Team	Pld	W	D	L	GF	GA	GD	Pts	Qualification or relegation
1	Tenerife	30	25	4	1	83	20	+63	79	Qualification to Copa de Campeones
2	Las Palmas	30	22	5	3	76	17	+59	71	Qualification to Copa del Rey
3	Acodetti	30	18	3	9	49	32	+17	57	
4	Orientación Marítima	30	13	9	8	42	26	+16	48	
5	Sobradillo	30	12	9	9	51	41	+10	45	
6	Laguna	30	10	8	12	45	50	−5	38 (Note: Laguna is ahead of San José on head-to-head goal differential: San José–Laguna 2–0, Laguna–San José 3–0)	
7	San José	30	11	5	14	37	46	−9	38	
8	Ofra	30	10	6	14	40	50	−10	36	
9	Unión Viera	30	10	5	15	36	51	−15	35 (Note: Unión Viera is ahead of Marino, Victoria and Maspalomas on head-to-head points: Unión Viera 11 pts, Marino 9 pts, Victoria 6 pts, Maspalomas 5 pts)	
10	Marino	30	9	8	13	42	55	−13	35	
11	Victoria	30	8	11	11	38	50	−12	35	
12	Maspalomas	30	9	8	13	38	41	−3	35	
13	Arucas	30	8	8	14	34	53	−19	32	Relegation to Liga Nacional
14	Estrella	30	8	7	15	44	73	−29	31	Relegation to Liga Nacional
15	Longuera-Toscal	30	8	4	18	43	64	−21	28	Relegation to Liga Nacional
16	Guía	30	6	6	18	41	70	−29	24	Relegation to Liga Nacional

Source: RFEF
Rules for classification: 1) Points; 2) Goal difference; 3) Number of goals scored

=== Group 7 ===
Pos	Team	Pld	W	D	L	GF	GA	GD	Pts	Qualification or relegation
1	Villarreal	30	21	5	4	81	23	+58	68	Qualification to Copa de Campeones
2	Levante	30	20	7	3	60	20	+40	67	Qualification to Copa del Rey
3	Valencia	30	19	4	7	61	28	+33	61	
4	Atlético Madrileño	30	18	5	7	57	36	+21	59	
5	Roda	30	16	8	6	55	32	+23	56	
6	Alzira	30	11	8	11	32	36	−4	41	
7	Alboraya	30	9	10	11	37	33	+4	37	
8	Albacete	30	9	9	12	43	51	−8	36	
9	Murcia	30	9	8	13	41	60	−19	35 (Note: Murcia is ahead of Torre Levante and Elche on head-to-head points: Murcia 10 pts, Torre Levante 4 pts, Elche 3 pts)	
10	Torre Levante	30	9	8	13	34	42	−8	35	
11	Elche	30	9	8	13	35	44	−9	35	
12	Lorca	30	8	10	12	26	37	−11	34	
13	Kelme	30	8	7	15	21	53	−32	31	Relegation to Liga Nacional
14	Ranero	30	7	6	17	24	45	−21	27	Relegation to Liga Nacional
15	Ciudad Cuenca	30	7	4	19	36	70	−34	25	Relegation to Liga Nacional
16	Racing Algemesí	30	5	3	22	22	55	−33	18	Relegation to Liga Nacional

Source: RFEF
Rules for classification: 1) Points; 2) Goal difference; 3) Number of goals scored

=== Ranking of second-placed teams ===
The best runner-up will qualify for the Copa de Campeones.

The seven best runners-up are determined by the following parameters, in this order:

1. Highest number of points
2. Goal difference
3. Highest number of goals scored

Pos	Grp	Team	Pld	W	D	L	PF	PA	PD	Pts	Qualification
1	5	Real Madrid	30	25	4	1	94	13	+81	79	Qualification to Copa de Campeones
2	1	Sporting Gijón	30	22	6	2	92	22	+70	72	
3	6	Las Palmas	30	22	5	3	76	17	+59	71	
4	7	Levante	30	20	7	3	60	20	+40	67	
5	3	Barcelona	30	21	3	6	64	18	+46	66	
6	2	Real Sociedad	30	21	1	8	88	31	+57	64	
7	4	Granada	30	19	4	7	49	27	+22	61	

=== Ranking of third-placed teams ===
The two best third-placed will qualify for the Copa del Rey.

The seven best third-placed are determined by the following parameters, in this order:

1. Highest number of points
2. Goal difference
3. Highest number of goals scored

Pos	Grp	Team	Pld	W	D	L	PF	PA	PD	Pts	Qualification
1	1	Racing Santander	30	20	5	5	75	29	+46	65	Qualification to Copa del Rey
2	3	Espanyol	30	20	5	5	59	25	+34	65	Qualification to Copa del Rey
3	5	Valladolid	30	20	4	6	60	26	+34	64	
4	7	Valencia	30	19	4	7	61	28	+33	61	
5	4	Betis	30	19	3	8	65	29	+36	60	
6	2	Alavés	30	16	10	4	69	30	+39	58	
7	6	Acodetti	30	18	3	9	49	32	+17	57	

== Copa de Campeones ==
The seven group champions and the best runner-up were qualified to this competition whose winner will play the 2019–20 UEFA Youth League. The draw was held in Vigo on 23 April 2019.

The quarterfinals were played in A Madroa, while the semifinals and final at Balaídos, in Vigo.

Quarterfinals
6 May – Vigo
Tenerife	0
Celta Vigo	2
6 May – Vigo
Atlético Madrid	0
Zaragoza	1
6 May – Vigo
Villarreal	3
Numancia	1
6 May – Vigo
Real Madrid	1 (3)
Sevilla	1 (4)

Semifinals
8 May – Vigo
Celta Vigo	0
Zaragoza	2
8 May – Vigo
Villarreal	3
Sevilla	0

Final
11 May – Vigo
Zaragoza	0 (7)
Villarreal	0 (6)

=== Quarter-finals ===
6 May 2019	Tenerife	0–2	Celta Vigo	Vigo
10:00		Quarterfinal	Cedrés 4' (o.g.); Losada 37'	Stadium: A Madroa; Referee: Gómez Lamerio

6 May 2019	Atlético Madrid	0–1	Zaragoza	Vigo
12:30		Quarterfinal	Francés 48'	Stadium: A Madroa; Referee: González Sobrado

6 May 2019	Villarreal	3–1	Numancia	Vigo
16:00	Galdón 43', 55'; Gonzaga 60'	Quarterfinal	Sidibeh 41'	Stadium: A Madroa; Referee: Fernández Rodríguez

6 May 2019	Real Madrid	1–1 (3–4 p)	Sevilla	Vigo
18:30	Park 16'	Quarterfinal	Casas 21'	Stadium: A Madroa; Referee: Martínez Santos

=== Semifinals ===
8 May 2019	Celta Vigo	0–2	Zaragoza	Vigo
12:00		Semifinal	Puche 1'; Sancho 64'	Stadium: Balaídos; Referee: Pastoriza Iglesias

8 May 2018	Villarreal	3–0	Sevilla	Vigo
17:00	Niño 14'; Baena 25'; Arana 90+3'	Semifinal		Stadium: Balaídos; Referee: Eiriz Mata

=== Final ===
11 May 2019
12:00

Zaragoza	0–0 (a.e.t.)	Villarreal
	Final
Penalties
Javi Hernández (penalty missed); Álvaro Martín (penalty scored); Vera (penalty scored); Francho (penalty scored); Miguel Puche (penalty scored); Jaime (penalty scored); Borge (penalty scored); Iván Castillo (penalty scored)	7–6	(penalty missed) Galdón; (penalty scored) Dani Tasende; (penalty scored) Arana; (penalty scored) Gonzaga; (penalty scored) Baena; (penalty scored) Pereiro; (penalty scored) Carlo; (penalty missed) John

Balaídos, Vigo
Referee: Muñiz Ruiz

Real Zaragoza:
GK	(Spain) Azón
DF	(Spain) Francés
DF	(Spain) Álvaro Martín
DF	(Spain) Javi Hernández	Booked
MF	(Spain) Francho	Booked
MF	(Spain) Iván Castillo
MF	(Spain) Alastuey		(substituted off) 58'
MF	(Spain) Borge
MF	(Spain) Benedet		(substituted off) 101'
FW	(Spain) Rodrigo Val		(substituted off) 79'
FW	(Spain) Jesús Jiménez		(substituted off) 69'
Substitutes:
MF	(Spain) Andreu		(substituted on) 58'
MF	(Spain) Vera		(substituted on) 101'
FW	(Spain) Miguel Puche		(substituted on) 69'
FW	(Spain) Jaime		(substituted on) 79'
Manager:
(Spain) Iván Martínez

Villarreal:
GK	(Sweden) Filip Jörgensen
DF	(Spain) Dani Tasende
DF	(Spain) Vadim	Booked
DF	(Spain) Pereiro
MF	(Spain) Izán		(substituted off) 90'
MF	(Spain) Morante		(substituted off) 84'
MF	(Spain) Carlo
MF	(Spain) Baena	Booked
MF	(Spain) Galdón
MF	(Spain) Enric		(substituted off) 73'
FW	(Spain) Fernando Niño		(substituted off) 108'
Substitutes:
MF	(Spain) John		(substituted on) 84'
FW	(Spain) Arana		(substituted on) 73'
FW	(Spain) Blanco		(substituted on) 90'
FW	(Spain) Gonzaga		(substituted on) 108'
Manager:
(Spain) Miguel Ángel Tena

Copa de Campeones
winners

1st title

== See also ==
- 2019 Copa del Rey Juvenil
