= 2022–23 Real Zaragoza season =

Real Zaragoza
2022–23 season
- President: Jorge Mas
- Head coach: Juan Carlos Carcedo (until 6 November); Fran Escribá (from 7 November)
- Stadium: La Romareda
- Segunda División: 13th
- Copa del Rey: First round
- Top goalscorer: League: Giuliano Simeone (9); All: Giuliano Simeone (9)
Home colours	Away colours	Third colours

The 2022–23 season was the 91st season in the history of Real Zaragoza and their 10th consecutive season in the second division. The club participated in the Segunda División and the Copa del Rey.

== Players ==
As of 20 September 2022

Note: Flags indicate national team as defined under FIFA eligibility rules; some limited exceptions apply. Players may hold more than one non-FIFA nationality.

No.	Pos.	Nation	Player
1	GK	ARG	Cristian Álvarez (captain)
2	DF	COL	Gabriel Fuentes (on loan from Atlético Junior)
3	DF	POR	Jair Amador
4	MF	SRB	Radosav Petrović
5	MF	ESP	Jaume Grau
6	DF	ESP	Alejandro Francés
7	FW	ESP	Miguel Puche
8	MF	ESP	Eugeni Valderrama
9	FW	ESP	Iván Azón
10	MF	ESP	Sergio Bermejo
11	MF	ARG	Valentín Vada
12	FW	ESP	Gaizka Larrazabal
13	GK	ESP	Álvaro Ratón
14	MF	ESP	Francho Serrano

No.	Pos.	Nation	Player
15	DF	BOL	Jairo Quinteros
16	DF	ESP	Dani Lasure
17	DF	ESP	Carlos Nieto
18	DF	ESP	Fran Gámez
19	FW	SEN	Makhtar Gueye (on loan from Oostende)
20	FW	ARG	Giuliano Simeone (on loan from Atlético Madrid)
21	MF	ESP	Alberto Zapater
22	DF	ESP	Carlos Vigaray
23	MF	ESP	Manu Molina
24	DF	ESP	Lluís López
27	DF	ESP	Marcos Luna
28	FW	ESP	Víctor Mollejo (on loan from Atlético Madrid)
35	GK	ESP	Dani Rebollo

=== Reserve team ===
Note: Flags indicate national team as defined under FIFA eligibility rules; some limited exceptions apply. Players may hold more than one non-FIFA nationality.

No.	Pos.	Nation	Player
30	DF	ESP	Miguel Operé
33	FW	ESP	Guillem Naranjo

=== Out on loan ===
Note: Flags indicate national team as defined under FIFA eligibility rules; some limited exceptions apply. Players may hold more than one non-FIFA nationality.

No.	Pos.	Nation	Player
—	MF	ESP	Marc Aguado (at Andorra until 30 June 2023)
—	MF	NGR	James Igbekeme (at Columbus Crew until 31 December 2022)
—	FW	ESP	Luis Carbonell (at Teruel until 30 June 2023)

No.	Pos.	Nation	Player
—	FW	ESP	Marcos Baselga (at Calahorra until 30 June 2023)
—	FW	ESP	Sabin Merino (at Atlético San Luis until 30 June 2023)

== Transfers ==
=== In ===
Date	Player	From	Type	Fee	Ref.
1 July 2022	(Spain) Manu Molina	Ibiza	Transfer	Free	
4 July 2022	(Argentina) Giuliano Simeone	Atlético Madrid	Loan		

=== Out ===
Date	Player	To	Type	Fee	Ref.
1 July 2022	(Spain) Marc Aguado	Andorra	Loan		
5 August 2022	(Equatorial Guinea) Federico Bikoro	(Norway) Sandefjord	Transfer	Undisclosed	
27 August 2022	(Spain) Enrique Clemente	Las Palmas	Transfer	Undisclosed	
31 August 2022	(Spain) Pep Chavarría	Rayo Vallecano	Transfer	Undisclosed	
1 September 2022	(Colombia) Juanjo Narváez	Valladolid	Transfer	Undisclosed	

== Pre-season and friendlies ==
Win Draw Loss Fixtures

23 July 2022 Friendly	Lleida Esportiu	1–3	Zaragoza	Lleida
19:30 CEST (UTC+2)		Report		Stadium: Camp d'Esports

27 July 2022 Friendly	Teruel	0–0	Zaragoza	Teruel
CEST (UTC+2)		Report		Stadium: Estadio de Pinilla; Attendance: 800; Referee: Aranda Anquela

29 July 2022 XIII Trofeo Ciudad de Tarragona	Gimnàstic Tarragona	3–3 (4–3 p)	Zaragoza	Tarragona
CEST (UTC+2)		Report		Stadium: Nou Estadi de Tarragona

31 July 2022 Friendly	Zaragoza	2–1	Al-Shabab
CEST (UTC+2)

3 August 2022 Friendly	Real Betis	2–2	Zaragoza
CEST (UTC+2)

7 August 2022 Friendly	Girona	1–1	Zaragoza
CEST (UTC+2)

== Competitions ==
=== Overall record ===
Competition	First match	Last match	Starting round	Final position	Record							
Competition	First match	Last match	Starting round	Final position	Pld	W	D	L	GF	GA	GD	Win %
Segunda División	13 August 2022	26 May 2023	Matchday 1	13th	42	12	17	13	40	39	+1	28.57
Copa del Rey	13 November 2022		First round	First round	1	0	0	1	0	1	−1	0.00
Total					43	12	17	14	40	40	+0	27.91

Source: Soccerway

=== Segunda División ===
==== League table ====
Pos	Team	Pld	W	D	L	GF	GA	GD	Pts
11	Burgos	42	13	15	14	33	35	−2	54 (Note: Burgos finished ahead of Racing Santander on head-to-head points: Racing Santander 0–1 Burgos, Burgos 2–1 Racing Santander.)
12	Racing Santander	42	14	12	16	39	40	−1	54
13	Zaragoza	42	12	17	13	40	39	+1	53 (Note: Zaragoza finished ahead of Leganés on head-to-head goal difference: Leganés 2–1 Zaragoza, Zaragoza 3–0 Leganés.)
14	Leganés	42	14	11	17	37	42	−5	53
15	Huesca	42	11	19	12	36	36	0	52 (Note: Huesca finished ahead of Mirandés on head-to-head points: Mirandés 1–1 Huesca, Huesca 1–0 Mirandés.)

Source: LaLiga SmartBank
Rules for classification: 1) points; 2) head-to-head points; 3) head-to-head goal difference; 4) goal difference; 5) number of goals scored
Notes:

Notes

1. Reserve teams are not eligible for promotion to the same league as the first team.

==== Results summary ====
Overall								Home						Away					
Pld	W	D	L	GF	GA	GD	Pts	W	D	L	GF	GA	GD	W	D	L	GF	GA	GD
42	12	17	13	40	39	+1	53	8	10	3	25	16	+9	4	7	10	15	23	−8

Source: LaLiga SmartBank

==== Results by round ====
Round	1	2	3	4	5	6	7	8	9	10	11	12	13	14	15	16	17	18	19	20	21	22	23	24	25	26	27	28	29	30	31	32	33	34	35	36	37	38	39	40	41	42
Ground	A	H	A	H	A	H	A	H	H	A	H	A	A	H	A	H	A	H	A	H	A	H	A	A	H	A	H	A	H	A	H	A	H	A	H	H	A	H	A	H	A	H
Result	D	D	L	L	W	W	L	D	D	L	W	L	W	L	L	D	D	W	D	W	L	D	W	L	D	W	L	L	D	D	W	D	D	D	W	W	D	D	L	W	L	D
Position	11	14	16	19	16	13	17	17	17	18	13	14	13	14	17	17	16	15	16	14	16	16	14	17	16	14	14	15	16	17	15	15	14	14	12	10	12	13	13	14	14	13

Source: LaLiga SmartBank
A = Away; H = Home; W = Win; D = Draw; L = Loss

==== Matches ====
The league fixtures were announced on 23 June 2022.
