= Pau Sans =

Spanish footballer (born 2004)

Personal information
- Full name: Pau Sans López
- Date of birth: 24 November 2004 (age 21)
- Place of birth: Zaragoza, Spain
- Height: 1.77 m (5 ft 10 in)
- Position: Forward

Team information
- Current team: Zaragoza

Youth career
- Amistad
- 2017–2023: Zaragoza

Senior career*
Years	Team	Apps	(Gls)
2023–2024	Zaragoza B	29	(4)
2023–	Zaragoza	52	(4)
2026	→ Cracovia (loan)	14	(1)
- * Club domestic league appearances and goals as of 16:43, 29 May 2026 (UTC)

Pau Sans López (born 24 November 2004) is a Spanish professional footballer who plays as a forward for Real Zaragoza.

== Career ==
Born in Zaragoza, Aragon, Sans joined Real Zaragoza's youth setup from UD Amistad. He made his senior debut with the reserves on 5 February 2023, playing the last eight minutes in a 1–1 Segunda Federación home draw against CD Teruel.

Sans made his first team debut on 11 February 2023, coming on as a second-half substitute for fellow youth graduate Miguel Puche in a 4–1 Segunda División home loss against Deportivo Alavés.

On 28 January 2026, Sans moved to Polish Ekstraklasa side Cracovia on loan for the remainder of the season, with an option to make the move permanent.

== Career statistics ==
As of match played 16 May 2026

Appearances and goals by club, season and competition
Club	Season	League			National cup (Note: Includes Copa del Rey)		Europe		Other		Total	
Club	Season	Division	Apps	Goals	Apps	Goals	Apps	Goals	Apps	Goals	Apps	Goals
Zaragoza B	2022–23	Segunda Federación	4	0	—		—		2 (Note: Appearances in Segunda Federación relegation play-offs)	0	6	0
Zaragoza B	2023–24	Segunda Federación	24	4	—		—		—		24	4
Zaragoza B	2024–25	Segunda Federación	1	0	—		—		—		1	0
Zaragoza B	Total		29	4	—		—		2	0	31	4
Zaragoza	2022–23	Segunda División	7	0	0	0	—		—		7	0
Zaragoza	2023–24	Segunda División	3	0	0	0	—		—		3	0
Zaragoza	2024–25	Segunda División	31	4	2	1	—		—		33	5
Zaragoza	2025–26	Segunda División	11	0	2	0	—		—		13	0
Zaragoza	Total		52	4	4	1	—		—		56	5
Cracovia (loan)	2025–26	Ekstraklasa	14	1	—		—		—		14	1
Career total			95	9	4	1	0	0	2	0	101	10

== Honours ==
Individual

- Real Zaragoza Player of the Month: April 2025
