= Iván Azón =

Spanish footballer (born 2002)

Personal information
- Full name: Iván Azón Monzón
- Date of birth: 24 December 2002 (age 23)
- Place of birth: Zaragoza, Spain
- Height: 1.81 m (5 ft 11 in)
- Position: Forward

Team information
- Current team: Getafe (on loan from Como)
- Number: 20

Youth career
- Amistad
- 2016–2020: Zaragoza
- 2018–2019: → El Olivar (loan)

Senior career*
Years	Team	Apps	(Gls)
2020	Zaragoza B	2	(0)
2020–2025	Zaragoza	144	(25)
2025–	Como	0	(0)
2025–2026	→ Ipswich Town (loan)	38	(5)
2026–	→ Getafe (loan)	5	(1)

International career^{‡}
2021–2023	Spain U21	3	(0)
- * Club domestic league appearances and goals as of 22:53, 4 May 2026 (UTC) ‡ National team caps and goals as of 11 September 2023

Iván Azón Monzón (born 24 December 2002) is a Spanish professional footballer who plays as a forward for La Liga club Getafe, on loan from Serie A club Como.

== Club career ==
=== Zaragoza ===
Born in Zaragoza, Aragon, Azón joined Real Zaragoza's youth setup from Amistad. He spent the 2018–19 season on loan at El Olivar after nursing a knee injury, but returned to the side ahead of the 2019–20 campaign, also playing in the UEFA Youth League.

Azón made his senior debut with the reserves on 18 July 2020, coming on as a second-half substitute in a 0–1 Tercera División away loss against Tarazona, in the promotion play-offs. He made his first team debut on 8 November, replacing Gabriel Fernández at half-time in a 0–1 away loss against Tenerife in the Segunda División championship.

Azón scored his first senior goal on 16 December 2020, netting the opener in a 2–0 away win against Gimnástica Torrelavega, for the season's Copa del Rey. His first league goal came on the following 2 January, as he netted the equalizer in a 1–1 draw at Cartagena. On 14 January 2021, Azón renewed his contract until 2024.

=== Como ===
On 3 February 2025, Azón signed with Como in Serie A.

==== Loan to Ipswich Town ====
On 28 August 2025, Azón signed with Ipswich Town on loan for the 2025–26 season. On 8 November 2025, he scored his first goal for the club against Swansea City.

He Helped Ipswich Town finish second place in the EFL Championship and gain Promotion to the Premier League for only the second time in 25 Years.

==== Loan to Getafe ====
On 1 September 2026, Azón returned to Spain after agreeing to a one-year loan deal with La Liga side Getafe.

== Career statistics ==
As of match played 2 May 2026

Appearances and goals by club, season and competition
Club	Season	League			National cup (Note: Includes Copa del Rey, FA Cup)		Other		Total	
Club	Season	Division	Apps	Goals	Apps	Goals	Apps	Goals	Apps	Goals
Zaragoza	2020–21	Segunda División	30	3	2	1	—		32	4
Zaragoza	2021–22	Segunda División	35	7	2	0	—		37	7
Zaragoza	2022–23	Segunda División	19	3	0	0	—		19	3
Zaragoza	2023–24	Segunda División	36	5	1	0	—		37	5
Zaragoza	2024–25	Segunda División	24	7	1	1	—		25	8
Zaragoza	Total		144	25	6	2	0	0	150	27
Como	2024–25	Serie A	0	0	—		—		0	0
Ipswich Town (loan)	2025–26	Championship	38	5	2	0	—		40	5
Career totals			182	30	8	2	0	0	190	32
