= Carlos Javier (footballer) =

Spanish footballer

Personal information
- Full name: Carlos Javier Rodríguez
- Date of birth: 19 January 1992 (age 34)
- Place of birth: Santa Cruz de Tenerife, Spain
- Height: 1.84 m (6 ft 0 in)
- Position: Midfielder

Youth career
- CD Calatorao
- 2004–2005: Amistad
- 2005–2010: Zaragoza

Senior career*
Years	Team	Apps	(Gls)
2010–2012	Zaragoza B	10	(0)
2010–2011	→ Ejea (loan)	0	(0)
2012–2013	Andorra	37	(5)
2013–2015	Zaragoza B	63	(1)
2014–2015	Zaragoza	1	(0)
2015–2016	Ebro	13	(0)
2016–2021	Tarazona	79	(2)
2021–2023	Teruel	79	(1)
2023–2024	Tarazona	24	(0)
2024–2025	Utebo	19	(0)
- * Club domestic league appearances and goals as of 4 May 2025

Carlos Javier Rodríguez (born 19 January 1992) is a Spanish professional footballer who plays as a midfielder.

== Football career ==
Born in Santa Cruz de Tenerife, Canary Islands, Javier graduated from Real Zaragoza's youth setup, and was subsequently loaned to SD Ejea. In June, however, he suffered a knee injury which took him out of the whole season.

Javier then returned to the Aragonese side, being assigned to the reserves in Segunda División B, but only contributed with ten appearances in the campaign due to another knee injury. In July 2012 he was released by Zaragoza and joined Andorra CF, in Tercera División.

On 3 July 2013 Javier moved back to the Blanquiazules, again being assigned to the B-side now in the fourth division. On 30 March of the following year he played his first match as a professional, replacing Barkero in a 2–2 draw at Deportivo Alavés in the Segunda División championship.
