= Umaru Konare =

Spanish footballer

Personal information
- Full name: Umaru Konare Tounkara
- Date of birth: 10 August 2004 (age 22)
- Place of birth: Monforte del Cid, Spain
- Position: Forward

Team information
- Current team: Ceuta (on loan from Elche)

Youth career
- Ilicitano Sporting
- Intangco
- Actur Pablo Iglesias

Senior career*
| Years | Team | Apps | (Gls) |
| 2023–2024 | Intercity B | 22 | (22) |
| 2024 | Intercity | 6 | (0) |
| 2024–2026 | Elche B | 38 | (6) |
| 2025 | → Barbastro (loan) | 5 | (0) |
| 2026– | Elche | 1 | (0) |
| 2026– | → Ceuta (loan) | 0 | (0) |
- * Club domestic league appearances and goals as of 17 August 2026

Umaru Konare Tounkara (born 10 August 2004) is a Spanish footballer who plays as a forward for AD Ceuta FC, on loan from Elche CF.

== Career ==
Born in Monforte del Cid, Valencian Community, Konare represented Ilicitano Sporting CF, SCD Intangco and CD Actur Pablo Iglesias as a youth before moving to CF Intercity in 2023. Initially a member of the B-team in the Segona FFCV, he also played with the main squad in Primera Federación during the season.

On 18 July 2024, Konare signed a three-year contract with Elche CF, being assigned to the reserves in Segunda Federación. Sparingly used, he was loaned to fellow fourth division side UD Barbastro on 2 February 2025.

Back to the Franjiverdes in July 2025, Konare started to feature regularly for the B's, and was the top scorer of the main squad in the 2026 pre-season with four goals. He made his professional – and La Liga – debut on 17 August of that year, coming on as a second-half substitute for Fer Niño in a 1–1 away draw against Deportivo de A Coruña, and renewed his link until 2030 the following day.

On 1 September 2026, Konare was loaned to Segunda División side AD Ceuta FC for the season.
