= Carlos Javier =

Carlos Javier may refer to:

- Carlos Javier (comics)
- Carlos Javier (footballer)
