= Daniel Sánchez =

Daniel Sánchez or Sanchez may refer to:

- Dani Sánchez (billiards player) (born 1974), Spanish three-cushion billiards player
- Dani Sánchez (footballer, born 1984), Spanish footballer
- Dani Sánchez (footballer, born 2000), Spanish footballer
- Daniel Sánchez (Uruguayan footballer) (born 1961), retired defender
- Daniel Sanchez (French footballer) (born 1953), retired striker
- Daniel Sanchez (Peruvian footballer) (born 1990), midfielder playing with Sporting Cristal
- Daniel Sánchez (wrestler) (born 1968), Puerto Rican Olympic wrestler
- Daniel Sánchez Llibre (born 1950), president of Spanish football club RCD Espanyol
- Daniel Sánchez Arévalo (born 1970), Spanish screenwriter and film director
- Danny Sanchez (born 1969), American soccer player and coach
- Daniel Sánchez, a character in the 2004 film Man on Fire
