= Alejandro Francés =

Spanish footballer (born 2002)

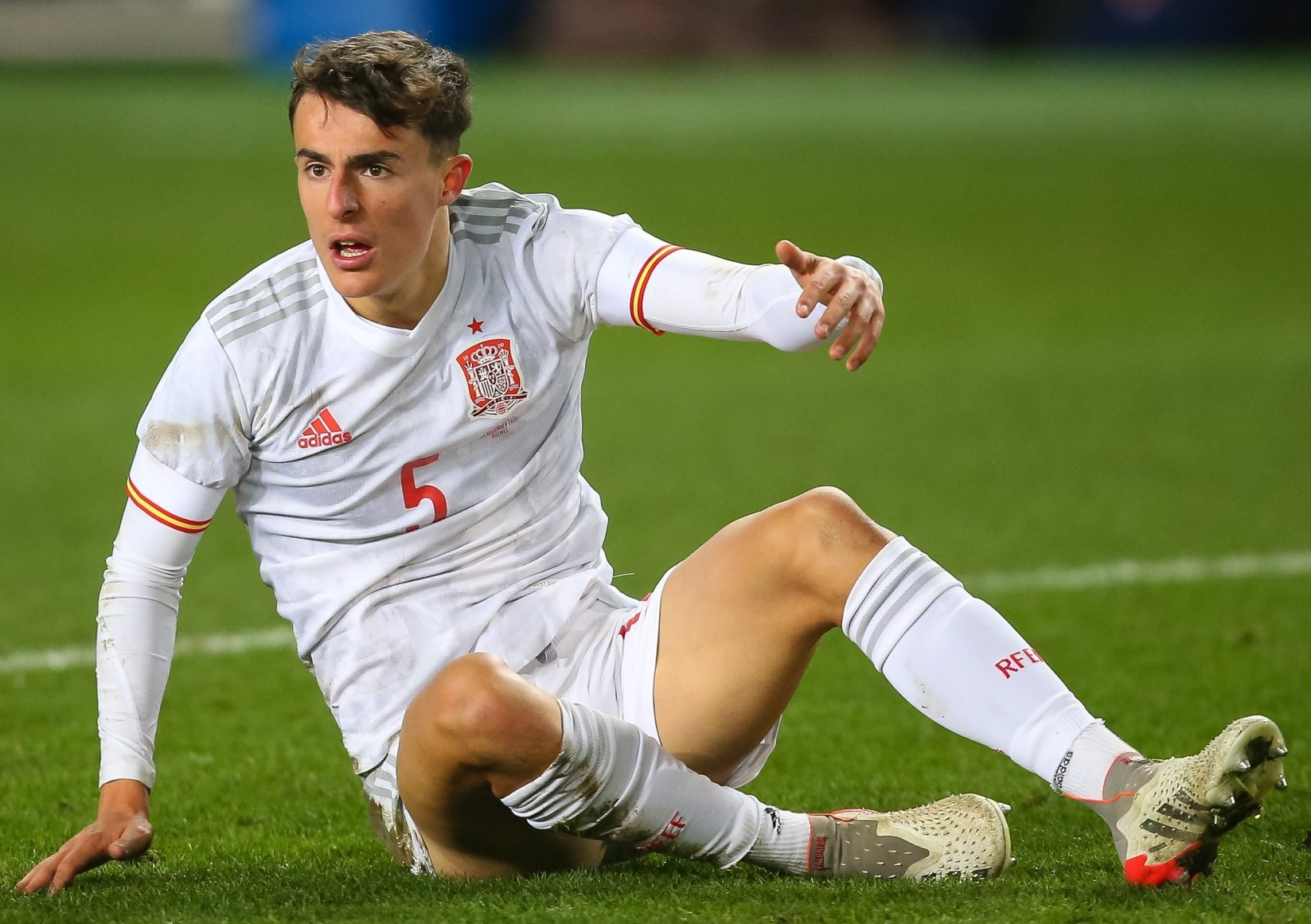
- Francés with Spain U21 in 2021

Personal information
- Full name: Alejandro Francés Torrijo
- Date of birth: 1 August 2002 (age 24)
- Place of birth: Zaragoza, Spain
- Height: 1.81 m (5 ft 11 in)
- Position: Centre-back

Team information
- Current team: Girona
- Number: 16

Youth career
- 2016–2019: Zaragoza

Senior career*
Years	Team	Apps	(Gls)
2019–2024	Zaragoza	123	(4)
2020	Zaragoza B	1	(0)
2024–	Girona	52	(0)

International career^{‡}
2019	Spain U17	2	(0)
2019–2020	Spain U18	8	(0)
2021–	Spain U21	20	(1)
- * Club domestic league appearances and goals as of 24 October 2026 ‡ National team caps and goals as of 03:46, 16 October 2024 (UTC)

Alejandro Francés Torrijo (born 1 August 2002) is a Spanish professional footballer who plays as a central defender for Segunda División club Girona.

== Club career ==
=== Zaragoza ===
Francés was born in Zaragoza, Aragon, and was a Real Zaragoza youth graduate. On 17 December 2019, before even having appeared for the B-side, he made his made his first team debut by starting in a 1–0 away win against UD Socuéllamos, for the season's Copa del Rey; along with fellow debutant Andrés Borge, both became the first players of the 21st century to appear for the club.

Francés made his professional debut on 21 January 2020, coming on as a late substitute for Pichu Atienza in a 3–1 home win over RCD Mallorca, also for the national cup. Five days later, he first appeared with the B-team by starting in a 1–2 Tercera División home loss against SD Tarazona.

Francés made his Segunda División on 16 June 2020, starting in a 3–1 away win against CD Lugo. On 20 August, he renewed his contract until 2024. The following February, he was given a permanent first team place and received the number 6 jersey.

=== Girona ===
On 26 July 2024, Francés signed a five-year contract with La Liga side Girona FC.

== International career ==
Francés represented the Spain under-17s at the 2019 FIFA U-17 World Cup, making two appearances.

== Career statistics ==
As of match played 27 October 2026

Appearances and goals by club, season and competition
Club	Season	League			National cup		Europe		Other		Total	
Club	Season	Division	Apps	Goals	Apps	Goals	Apps	Goals	Apps	Goals	Apps	Goals
Zaragoza	2019–20	Segunda División	3	0	2	0	—		0	0	5	0
Zaragoza	2020–21	Segunda División	28	0	1	0	—		—		29	0
Zaragoza	2021–22	Segunda División	33	1	0	0	—		—		33	1
Zaragoza	2022–23	Segunda División	23	0	1	0	—		—		24	0
Zaragoza	2023–24	Segunda División	36	3	0	0	—		—		36	3
Zaragoza	Total		123	4	4	0	—		0	0	127	4
Zaragoza B	2019–20	Tercera División	1	0	—		—		—		1	0
Girona	2024–25	La Liga	18	0	1	0	6 (Note: Appearances in UEFA Champions League)	0	—		25	0
Girona	2025–26	La Liga	23	0	1	0	—		—		24	0
Girona	2026–27	Segunda División	11	0	1	0	—		—		12	0
Girona	Total		52	0	3	0	6	0	—		61	0
Career total			176	4	7	0	6	0	0	0	189	4
