= Valentín Vada =

Argentine footballer

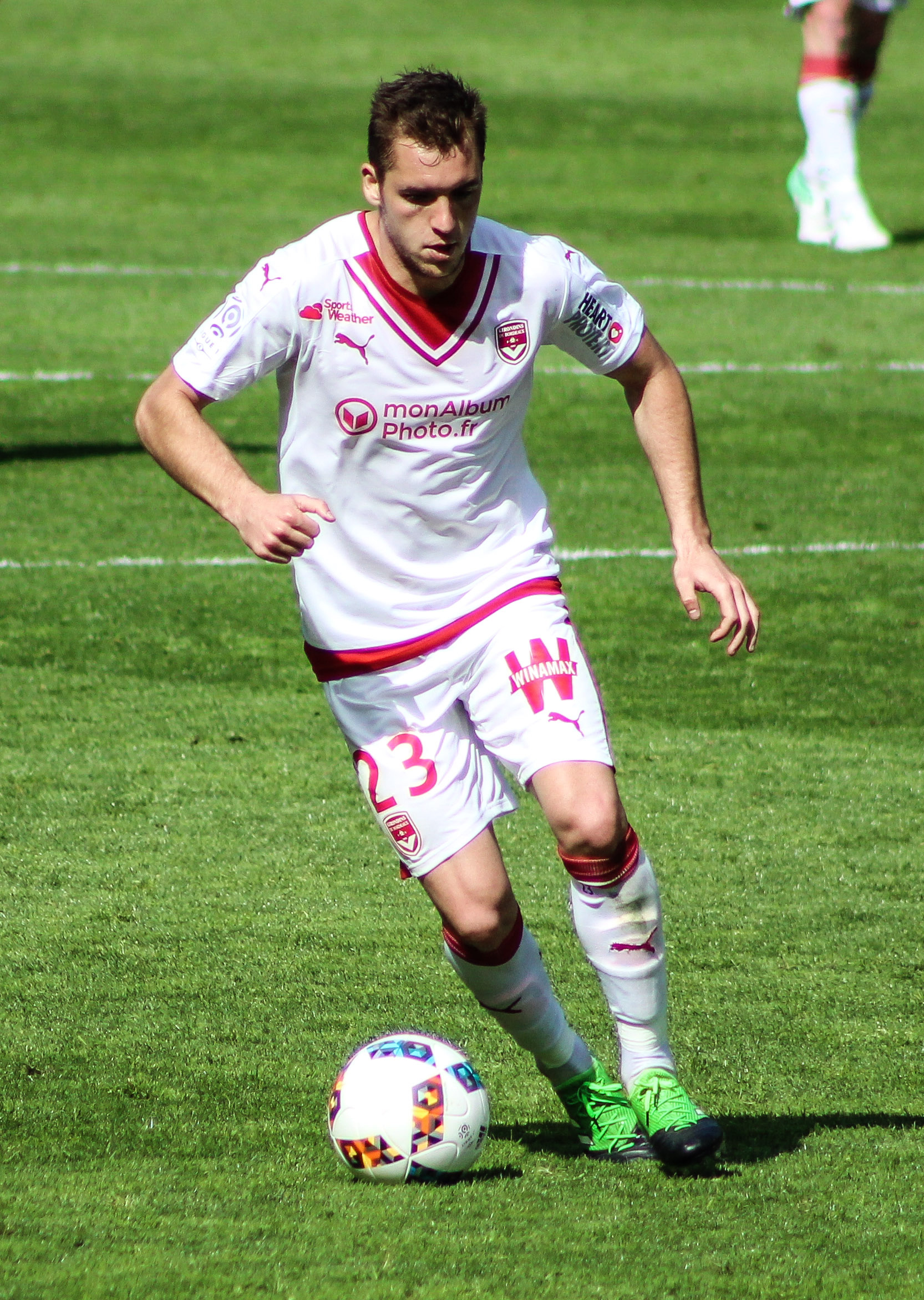
- Vada with Bordeaux in 2017

Personal information
- Date of birth: 6 March 1996 (age 30)
- Place of birth: Santa Fe, Argentina
- Height: 1.75 m (5 ft 9 in)
- Position: Midfielder

Team information
- Current team: Neom
- Number: 23

Youth career
- 2006–2010: Proyecto Crecer
- 2010–2014: Bordeaux

Senior career*
Years	Team	Apps	(Gls)
2013–2019	Bordeaux II	59	(7)
2014–2019	Bordeaux	86	(8)
2019	→ Saint-Étienne (loan)	12	(1)
2019–2021	Almería	32	(2)
2020–2021	→ Tenerife (loan)	32	(2)
2021–2023	Zaragoza	66	(11)
2023–2025	Rubin Kazan	45	(6)
2025–2026	Damac	33	(11)
2026–	Neom	6	(1)
- * Club domestic league appearances and goals as of 5 November 2026

Valentín Vada (Spanish pronunciation: [balenˈtim ˈbaða]; (Note: In isolation, Valentín is pronounced [balenˈtin].) born 6 March 1996) is an Argentine professional footballer who plays as a midfielder for Saudi club Neom.

== Career ==
Vada's move to France was controversial. In 2010 at the age of 14 as a minor, his arrival from a non-EU country was against the laws governing the movement of underage players. Italian heritage ameliorated those concerns eventually, but Vada was unable to play in any competitive matches, even for the “B” team until he turned 17.

Vada made his Ligue 1 debut on 13 December 2015 against Angers SCO replacing Nicolas Maurice-Belay after 79 minutes. He scored his first professional goals on 8 April 2017, netting a brace in a 3–0 home defeat of FC Metz.

On 31 January 2019, the last day of the 2018–19 winter transfer window, Vada joined Bordeaux's league rivals AS Saint-Étienne on loan until the end of the season. On 23 August, he agreed to a five-year contract with Segunda División side UD Almería.

On 4 October 2020, despite being a regular starter for the Andalusians, Vada was loaned to fellow second division side CD Tenerife for the 2020–21 season. On 31 August 2021, he terminated his contract with Almería, and signed a two-year deal with Real Zaragoza in the same category just hours later.

On 14 September 2023, Vada signed a two-year contract with Russian Premier League club Rubin Kazan.

On 26 August 2025, Vada joined Saudi Pro League club Damac.

== Career statistics ==
As of match played 15 May 2026

Appearances and goals by club, season and competition
Club	Season	League			National cup		League cup		Europe		Other		Total	
Club	Season	Division	Apps	Goals	Apps	Goals	Apps	Goals	Apps	Goals	Apps	Goals	Apps	Goals
Bordeaux II	2013–14	CFA	24	1	—		—		—		—		24	1
Bordeaux II	2014–15	CFA	24	4	—		—		—		—		24	4
Bordeaux II	2015–16	CFA	8	1	—		—		—		—		8	1
Bordeaux II	2018–19	CFA 2	3	1	—		—		—		—		3	1
Bordeaux II	Total		59	7	—		—		—		—		59	7
Bordeaux	2014–15	Ligue 1	0	0	0	0	0	0	—		—		0	0
Bordeaux	2015–16	Ligue 1	16	0	3	0	2	0	1 (Note: Appearance(s) in the UEFA Europa League)	0	—		22	0
Bordeaux	2016–17	Ligue 1	28	6	2	0	4	0	—		—		34	6
Bordeaux	2017–18	Ligue 1	21	2	0	0	1	0	1	0	—		23	2
Bordeaux	2018–19	Ligue 1	2	0	1	0	1	0	3	0	—		7	0
Bordeaux	Total		67	8	6	0	8	0	5	0	—		86	8
Saint-Étienne (loan)	2018–19	Ligue 1	12	1	0	0	0	0	0	0	—		12	1
Almería (loan)	2019–20	Segunda División	32	2	0	0	—		—		2 (Note: Appearance(s) in Segunda División play-offs)	0	34	2
Tenerife (loan)	2020–21	Segunda División	32	1	3	1	—		—		—		35	2
Real Zaragoza	2021–22	Segunda División	29	7	0	0	—		—		—		29	7
Real Zaragoza	2022–23	Segunda División	37	4	1	0	—		—		—		38	4
Real Zaragoza	Total		66	11	1	0	—		—		—		67	11
Rubin Kazan	2023–24	Russian Premier League	21	4	1	0	—		—		—		22	4
Rubin Kazan	2024–25	Russian Premier League	24	2	6	0	—		—		—		30	2
Rubin Kazan	Total		45	6	7	0	—		—		—		52	6
Damac	2025–26	Saudi Pro League	33	11	1	0	—		—		—		34	11
Neom	2026–27	Saudi Pro League	0	0	0	0	—		—		—		0	0
Career total			346	47	18	1	8	0	5	0	2	0	379	48
