= Lluís López =

Spanish footballer

Personal information
- Full name: Lluís López Mármol
- Date of birth: 5 March 1997 (age 29)
- Place of birth: Sant Joan de Vilatorrada, Spain
- Height: 1.82 m (6 ft 0 in)
- Position: Centre back

Team information
- Current team: Albacete
- Number: 22

Youth career
- Gimnàstic Manresa
- 2005–2015: Espanyol

Senior career*
Years	Team	Apps	(Gls)
2015–2019	Espanyol B	117	(8)
2018–2021	Espanyol	28	(0)
2020	→ Tenerife (loan)	9	(0)
2021–2025	Zaragoza	108	(1)
2025	Shandong Taishan	10	(0)
2026–	Albacete	14	(2)

International career
2013	Spain U16	1	(0)
2013	Spain U17	4	(0)
2015–2016	Spain U19	3	(0)
- * Club domestic league appearances and goals as of 9 June 2026

Lluís López Mármol (born 5 March 1997) is a Spanish professional footballer who plays as a central defender for Albacete Balompié.

== Club career ==
Born in Sant Joan de Vilatorrada, Barcelona, Catalonia, López joined RCD Espanyol's youth setup in 2005, aged eight, after starting out at Club Gimnàstic de Manresa. On 4 June 2015 he was promoted to the reserves, being also called up to the main squad for pre-season on 9 July.

López made his senior debut on 23 August 2015, starting and being booked in a 1–0 home win against Lleida Esportiu in the Segunda División B. He scored his first goal in the category on 4 October, netting his team's only in a 1–1 draw against Valencia CF Mestalla also at the Ciutat Esportiva Dani Jarque; thirteen days later, he scored a brace in a 4–5 home loss against CD Eldense.

On 6 July 2018, López renewed his contract until 2022, being definitely promoted to the main squad ahead of the 2019–20 campaign. He made his first-team debut on 1 November, coming on as a second-half substitute for injured Naldo in a 1–2 away loss against Cádiz CF, in the season's Copa del Rey.

López made his La Liga debut on 21 January 2019, playing the full 90 minutes in a 0–3 away loss against SD Eibar. On 30 January of the following year, after being rarely used, he was loaned to Segunda División side CD Tenerife until the end of the season.

Upon returning, López featured in 18 matches during the 2020–21 season, as the Pericos returned to the top tier. On 18 August 2021, he terminated his contract with the club, and signed a two-year deal with Real Zaragoza in the second division just hours later.

On 21 July 2025, López transferred to Chinese Super League club Shandong Taishan FC as free agent. The following 21 January, he returned to his home country after agreeing to an 18-month contract with Albacete Balompié in the second division.

== Career statistics ==
As of match played 18 October 2025

Appearances and goals by club, season and competition
Club	Season	League			National Cup		Continental		Other		Total	
Club	Season	Division	Apps	Goals	Apps	Goals	Apps	Goals	Apps	Goal	Apps	Goal
Espanyol B	2016–17	Segunda División B	29	3	—		—		—		29	3
Espanyol B	2017–18	Segunda División B	34	0	—		—		—		34	0
Espanyol B	2018–19	Segunda División B	32	4	—		—		2	0	34	4
Espanyol B	2019–20	Segunda División B	27	1	—		—		0	0	27	1
Espanyol B	Total		122	8	—		—		2	0	124	8
Espanyol	2015–16	La Liga	0	0	0	0	—		—		0	0
Espanyol	2018–19	La Liga	6	0	4	0	—		—		10	0
Espanyol	2019–20	La Liga	4	0	2	0	9	1	—		15	1
Espanyol	2020–21	Segunda División	18	0	1	0	—		—		19	0
Espanyol	Total		28	0	7	0	9	1	—		34	1
Tenerife (loan)	2019–20	Segunda División	9	0	—		—		—		9	0
Zaragoza	2021–22	Segunda División	30	0	3	0	—		—		33	0
Zaragoza	2022–23	Segunda División	31	1	0	0	—		—		31	1
Zaragoza	2023–24	Segunda División	18	0	1	0	—		—		19	0
Zaragoza	2024–25	Segunda División	29	0	1	0	—		—		30	0
Zaragoza	Total		108	1	5	0	—		—		113	1
Shandong Taishan	2025	Chinese Super League	10	0	—		—		—		10	0
Career total			277	9	12	0	9	1	2	0	300	10
