= José Luis García Traid =

Spanish footballer and manager

Personal information
- Full name: José Luis García Traid
- Date of birth: 6 April 1936
- Place of birth: Zaragoza, Spain
- Date of death: 11 January 1990 (aged 53)
- Place of death: Zaragoza, Spain
- Position: Midfielder

Youth career
- Patria
- La Salle

Senior career*
Years	Team	Apps	(Gls)
1953–1963	Zaragoza	96	(9)
1953–1954	→ Celta (loan)		
1954–1955	→ Amistad (loan)		
1956–1957	→ Levante (loan)	10	(2)
Total		106	(11)

International career
1962	Spain B	1	(0)

Managerial career
- San Lamberto (youth)
- Deportivo Aragón
- 1969–1970: Huesca
- 1971: Zaragoza
- 1971–1972: Deportivo Aragón
- 1972–1978: Salamanca
- 1978–1979: Betis
- 1979: Burgos
- 1980–1981: Atlético Madrid
- 1981–1982: Atlético Madrid
- 1982–1984: Valladolid
- 1985: Salamanca
- 1985–1986: Celta
- 1986: Hércules
- 1988–1989: Salamanca
- * Club domestic league appearances and goals

José Luis García Traid (6 April 1936 – 11 January 1990) was a Spanish footballer, who played as a midfielder, and a manager.

== Playing career ==
Born in Zaragoza, Aragon, García Traid represented Club Patria Aragon and SD La Salle as a youth, before joining Real Zaragoza. Loan stints followed, with Tercera División sides Celta de Vigo and UD Amistad.

García Traid made his professional debut on 13 November 1955, starting and scoring a hat-trick in a 7–1 home routing of CP La Felguera in the Segunda División. He appeared in two further matches during the campaign, as his side achieved promotion to La Liga.

In January 1957, after making no appearances during the season, García Traid was loaned to Levante UD in the second level until June. He appeared in ten matches and scored two goals for the Valencians before his loan expired.

García Traid made his debut in the main category of Spanish football on 3 November 1957, in a 0–0 away draw against UD Las Palmas. He scored his first goal in the category on 7 December of the following year, but in a 1–7 loss at Atlético Madrid.

From 1958 to 1961, García Traid became a regular starter for the Maños, with his best input consisting of 28 matches and two goals in the 1959–60 campaign. He retired in 1963, aged only 26, due to a recurrent injury.

== Managerial career ==
After retiring García Traid worked as a manager, his first club being AD San Lamberto's youth squads. In January 1971 he was named manager of his lifetime club Zaragoza, after a one-year spell at SD Huesca.

García Traid was sacked in April, after failing to maintain the club's first division status. In 1973, he was appointed UD Salamanca manager, achieving top level promotion at first attempt; he remained in charge of the latter until 1978.

After a spell at Real Betis in the second tier, García Traid was appointed at the helm of Burgos CF in 1979. After again suffering relegation, he was named Atlético Madrid manager.

García Traid was relieved from his duties at Atleti in August 1981, but returned to the club in November after the dismissal of Luis Cid; he remained in charge until the end of the season. In the following years he managed Real Valladolid, Salamanca (two spells), Celta de Vigo and Hércules CF.

== Death ==
On 11 January 1990, García Traid died in Zaragoza due to a mechanical failure during a plastic surgery.
