= 2019 Copa del Rey Juvenil =

Tournament details
- Country: Spain
- Teams: 16

Final positions
- Champions: Villarreal
- Runners-up: Atlético Madrid

Tournament statistics
- Matches played: 29
- Goals scored: 96 (3.31 per match)

The 2019 Copa del Rey Juvenil is the 69th staging of the Copa del Rey Juvenil de Fútbol. The competition started on 18 May 2019.

== First round ==
The top two teams from each group of the 2018–19 División de Honor Juvenil de Fútbol and the two best third-placed teams were drawn into a two-game best aggregate score series. The first leg was played on May 18 and 19 and the second on May 25 and 26.

Team 1	Agg.	Team 2	1st leg	2nd leg
Levante	10–3	Sevilla	7–1	3–2
Granada	2–5	Barcelona	2–2	0–3
Tenerife	2–6	Real Madrid	1–2	1–4
Sporting Gijón	0–2	Espanyol	0–0	0–2
Racing Santander	4–6	Real Sociedad	2–3	2–3
Villarreal	3–2	Zaragoza	2–1	1–1
Celta Vigo	2–4	Numancia	1–0	1–4
Las Palmas	1–6	Atlético Madrid	1–3	0–3

== Quarterfinals ==
The eight winners from the first round advanced to quarterfinals, that were played in a two-game series. The first leg were played on June 1 and 2 and the second on June 8 and 9.

Team 1	Agg.	Team 2	1st leg	2nd leg
Villarreal	5–1	Real Sociedad	4–1	1–1
Numancia	1–4	Levante	1–1	0–3
Barcelona	1–3	Real Madrid	0–2	1–1
Atlético Madrid	4–2	Espanyol	3–2	1–0

== Semifinals ==
The four winners from the quarterfinals advanced to semifinals, that are played in a two-game series. The first leg was played on June 16 and the second leg will be played on June 23.

Team 1	Agg.	Team 2	1st leg	2nd leg
Levante	4–5	Atlético Madrid	1–2	3–3
Villarreal	3–2	Real Madrid	1–0	2–2

== Final ==
Team 1	Score	Team 2
Atlético Madrid	0–3	Villarreal

== See also ==
- 2018–19 División de Honor Juvenil de Fútbol
