= Pablo Cortés =

Spanish footballer

Personal information
- Full name: Pablo Cortés García
- Date of birth: 28 May 2004 (age 22)
- Place of birth: Zaragoza, Spain
- Height: 1.69 m (5 ft 7 in)
- Position: Attacking midfielder

Team information
- Current team: Deportivo B
- Number: 19

Youth career
- 2009–2014: Actur Pablo Iglesias
- 2014–2022: Zaragoza

Senior career*
Years	Team	Apps	(Gls)
2022–2025	Zaragoza B	84	(7)
2024–2025	Zaragoza	1	(0)
2025–	Deportivo B	23	(1)
- * Club domestic league appearances and goals as of 14 May 2026

Pablo Cortés García (born 28 May 2004) is a Spanish footballer who plays as an attacking midfielder for Deportivo Fabril.

== Career ==
Born in Zaragoza, Cortés joined Real Zaragoza's youth setup from CD Actur Pablo Iglesias in 2014, and signed his first professional contract in 2019, aged 15. He made his senior debut with the reserves on 4 September 2022, starting in a 1–0 Segunda Federación away win over AE Prat.

Cortés scored his first senior goal on 15 January 2023, netting the B's third through a penalty kick in a 4–1 home routing of CF Badalona Futur. He made his first team debut on 27 April of the following year, coming on as a late substitute for Fran Gámez in a 1–1 Segunda División away draw against CD Leganés.

On 8 July 2024, Cortés renewed his contract with the Maños. On 13 August of the following year, he moved to another reserve team, Deportivo Fabril also in the fourth division.

== Personal life ==
Pablo's younger brother Íñigo is also a footballer and a midfielder. He too is a Zaragoza youth graduate.
