= Ángel López (footballer, born 2003) =

Spanish footballer

Personal information
- Full name: Ángel López Ramón
- Date of birth: 17 February 2003 (age 23)
- Place of birth: Zaragoza, Spain
- Height: 1.76 m (5 ft 9 in)
- Position: Right back

Team information
- Current team: Tarazona
- Number: 2

Youth career
- 2017–2021: Zaragoza

Senior career*
Years	Team	Apps	(Gls)
2020–2022	Zaragoza B	29	(0)
2021–2023	Zaragoza	1	(0)
2022–2023	→ Calahorra (loan)	30	(1)
2023–2024	Algeciras	12	(0)
2024	→ San Fernando (loan)	3	(0)
2024–2025	Mallorca B	14	(0)
2025–	Tarazona	53	(2)

International career^{‡}
2020	Spain U17	1	(0)
2019–2020	Spain U18	3	(0)
2022	Spain U19	1	(0)
- * Club domestic league appearances and goals as of 10 June 2026 ‡ National team caps and goals as of 23 February 2022

Ángel López Ramón (born 17 February 2003) is a Spanish footballer who plays as a right back for Primera Federación club Tarazona.

== Club career ==
Born in Zaragoza, Aragon, López represented Real Zaragoza as a youth. He made his senior debut with the reserves on 18 October 2020, starting in a 1–1 Tercera División away draw against CF Illueca.

López made his first-team debut on 1 December 2021, starting in a 1–0 away win over CD Mensajero in the season's Copa del Rey. His professional debut occurred 13 days later, as he started in a 2–0 home win against Burgos CF, also in the national cup.

On 1 July 2022, López renewed his contract until 2024 and was loaned to Primera Federación side CD Calahorra for the season. Despite being a regular starter, he terminated his link with his parent club on 27 June 2023.
