= Dani Sánchez (footballer, born 2000) =

Spanish footballer (born 2000)

Personal information
- Full name: Daniel Rodríguez Sánchez
- Date of birth: 14 January 2000 (age 26)
- Place of birth: Málaga, Spain
- Height: 1.71 m (5 ft 7 in)
- Position: Left-back

Youth career
- 2007–2012: Tiro Pichón
- 2012–2015: San Félix
- 2015–2019: Real Madrid

Senior career*
Years	Team	Apps	(Gls)
2019	Málaga B	1	(0)
2019–2020	El Ejido	26	(1)
2020–2021	Extremadura	0	(0)
2021	→ Linares (loan)	9	(0)
2021–2022	Sabadell	29	(0)
2022–2023	Numancia	37	(3)
2023–2026	Málaga	66	(2)
- * Club domestic league appearances and goals as of 3 June 2026

Daniel Rodríguez "Dani" Sánchez (born 14 January 2000) is a Spanish professional footballer who plays as a left-back.

== Career ==
Born in Málaga, Andalusia, Sánchez joined Real Madrid's La Fábrica in 2015, after representing Málaga CF's affiliate side CD San Félix and CD Tiro Pichón. In January 2019, he returned to Málaga as a part of the deal which saw Chechu move in the opposite direction, and was assigned to the reserves in Segunda División B.

On 29 August 2019, after featuring in just one match, Sánchez signed for Tercera División side CD El Ejido. He was a regular starter as the club returned to the third division at first attempt, and signed a three-year deal with Extremadura UD in that category on 11 August 2020.

On 19 January 2021, after failing to feature with the Azulgranas, Sánchez was loaned to fellow third division side Linares Deportivo for the remainder of the season. On 17 August, he moved to CE Sabadell FC in the newly-created Primera División RFEF.

On 18 July 2022, Sánchez agreed to a one-year deal with CD Numancia also in the third tier. After being a regular starter as the club suffered relegation, he returned to Málaga on a two-year contract on 11 August 2023.

A backup to Víctor García, Sánchez contributed with 29 appearances overall during the 2023–24 campaign, as the Blanquiazules achieved promotion to Segunda División. On 2 July 2024, he signed a new one-year deal with the club, and made his professional debut on 31 August, coming on as a second-half substitute for Víctor García in a 2–1 home win over Albacete Balompié.

On 19 May 2025, Sánchez further extended his link with Málaga until 2027. On 26 August of the following year, after featuring more sparingly as the club achieved another promotion, he left.
