= Dani Tasende =

Spanish footballer (born 2000)

Personal information
- Full name: Daniel Esmorís Tasende
- Date of birth: 6 July 2000 (age 26)
- Place of birth: Coristanco, Spain
- Height: 1.72 m (5 ft 8 in)
- Position: Left-back

Team information
- Current team: Córdoba

Youth career
- Luís Calvo Sanz
- 2013–2015: Manchester City
- 2015–2016: Bergantiños
- 2016–2019: Villarreal

Senior career*
Years	Team	Apps	(Gls)
2019–2020	Villarreal C	15	(0)
2020–2024	Villarreal B	131	(10)
2021–2024	Villarreal	0	(0)
2024–2026	Zaragoza	65	(2)
2026–	Córdoba	0	(0)
- * Club domestic league appearances and goals as of 31 May 2026

Daniel "Dani" Esmorís Tasende (born 6 July 2000) is a Spanish professional footballer who plays as a left-back for Segunda División club Córdoba.

== Club career ==
Born in Coristanco, A Coruña, Galicia, Tasende started his career with EF Luis Calvo Sanz (the youth setup of Bergantiños FC) before moving to England in 2013, after his brother signed with Manchester City. He played two years in the club's Academy, before moving back to his home country and Bergantiños in 2015.

In 2016, Tasende moved to Villarreal CF's youth setup, and made his senior debut with the C-team on 15 March 2019, starting in a 3–0 Tercera División away loss against CD Roda. He was promoted to the reserves in Segunda División B ahead of the 2020–21 season, and scored his first senior goal on 1 November 2020, netting the equalizer in a 2–1 away win over CF La Nucía.

Tasende made his first team debut on 30 November 2021, coming on as a second-half substitute for Dani Raba in a 8–0 away routing of Victoria CF, for the season's Copa del Rey. He made his professional debut with the B-side the following 14 August, starting in a 2–0 away win over Racing de Santander.

Tasende scored his first professional goal in football on 15 October 2022, netting the B's equalizer in a 2–1 away loss against Real Zaragoza. On 10 July 2024, he moved to said club on a four-year contract.

Tasende left Zaragoza in June 2026 after their relegation, and signed a two-year deal with Córdoba CF shortly after.

== Personal life ==
Tasende's older brother, José, better known as Angeliño, is also a footballer and plays as a left-back for La Liga side Deportivo A Coruña. He also played for Manchester City as a youth.
