= Javi Hernández (footballer, born 2000) =

Spanish footballer

Personal information
- Full name: Javier Hernández Tarroc
- Date of birth: 14 September 2000 (age 26)
- Place of birth: Zaragoza, Spain
- Height: 1.85 m (6 ft 1 in)
- Position: Centre back

Team information
- Current team: Ebro
- Number: 15

Youth career
- 2013–2019: Zaragoza

Senior career*
Years	Team	Apps	(Gls)
2018–2023	Zaragoza B	116	(6)
2020–2023	Zaragoza	1	(0)
2023–2024	Utebo	28	(0)
2024–2025	Guijuelo	26	(0)
2025–	Ebro	26	(4)
- * Club domestic league appearances and goals as of 14 May 2026

Javier "Javi" Hernández Tarroc (born 14 September 2000) is a Spanish footballer who plays as a central defender for Segunda Federación club Ebro.

== Club career ==
Hernández was born in Zaragoza, Aragón, and was a Real Zaragoza youth graduate. He made his senior debut with the reserves on 28 October 2018, starting in a 5–1 Tercera División home routing of SD Borja.

Hernández scored his first senior goal on 14 April 2019, netting the opener in a 4–1 home success over CD Binéfar. He made his first team debut on 16 December of the following year, starting in a 2–0 away win against Gimnástica de Torrelavega, for the season's Copa del Rey.

Hernández made his professional debut on 5 January 2021, coming on as a late substitute for Alberto Guitián in a 1–2 loss at AD Alcorcón, also in the national cup.
