= Dani Rebollo =

Spanish footballer

Personal information
- Full name: Daniel Rebollo Franco
- Date of birth: 10 December 1999 (age 26)
- Place of birth: Lepe, Spain
- Height: 1.85 m (6 ft 1 in)
- Position: Goalkeeper

Team information
- Current team: AVS
- Number: 1

Youth career
- Punta del Caimán
- 2017–2018: Betis

Senior career*
Years	Team	Apps	(Gls)
2018–2022	Betis B	60	(1)
2022–2024	Zaragoza B	26	(0)
2022–2024	Zaragoza	11	(0)
2024–2026	Gimnàstic	52	(0)
2026–	AVS	6	(0)
- * Club domestic league appearances and goals as of 13 September 2026

Daniel "Dani" Rebollo Franco (born 10 December 1999) is a Spanish footballer who plays as a goalkeeper for Liga Portugal 2 club AVS.

== Club career ==
Born in Lepe, Huelva, Andalusia, Rebollo joined Real Betis' youth setup in 2017, from UD Punta del Caimán. He made his senior debut with the reserves on 25 February 2018, starting in a 2–1 Segunda División B home loss against CF Villanovense.

On 23 October 2019, Rebollo renewed his contract until 2022. On 21 March 2021, he scored a stoppage time equalizer in a 2–1 away win over Córdoba CF.

On 8 July 2022, free agent Rebollo agreed to a one-year deal with Segunda División side Real Zaragoza. Initially a third-choice behind Cristian Álvarez and Álvaro Ratón, he made his professional debut on 10 December, starting in a 3–0 home success over SD Huesca.

Rebollo spent the 2023–24 campaign as a backup to Cristian Álvarez, overtaking Gaëtan Poussin in the pecking order, while also being a starter for the reserves in Segunda Federación. On 21 July 2024, he terminated his link with the Maños, and agreed to a one-year contract with Primera Federación side Gimnàstic de Tarragona just hours later.
