= CD Actur Pablo Iglesias =

Spanish football team

Actur Pablo Iglesias
- Full name: Club Deportivo Actur Pablo Iglesias
- Founded: 1999
- Ground: Pablo Iglesias, Zaragoza, Aragón, Spain
- Chairman: Ana Mª Guil Pérez
- Manager: Alfredo Alba Gimenez
- League: Primera Regional – Group 1
- 2024–25: Primera Regional – Group 1, 5th of 18
Home colours

Club Deportivo Actur Pablo Iglesias is a football team based in Zaragoza in the autonomous community of Aragón. They currently play in Primera Regional – Group 1. Its stadium is Pablo Iglesias.

== Season to season ==
Season	Tier	Division	Place	Copa del Rey
2001–02	7	2ª Reg.	2nd	
2002–03	6	1ª Reg.	11th	
2003–04	6	1ª Reg.	4th	
2004–05	6	1ª Reg.	1st	
2005–06	5	Reg. Pref.	10th	
2006–07	5	Reg. Pref.	9th	
2007–08	5	Reg. Pref.	16th	
2008–09	6	1ª Reg.	5th	
2009–10	6	1ª Reg.	4th	
2010–11	6	1ª Reg.	3rd	
2011–12	5	Reg. Pref.	15th	
2012–13	6	1ª Reg.	1st	
2013–14	5	Reg. Pref.	14th	
2014–15	5	Reg. Pref.	14th	
2015–16	5	Reg. Pref.	6th	
2016–17	5	Reg. Pref.	5th	
2017–18	5	Reg. Pref.	11th	
2018–19	5	Reg. Pref.	12th	
2019–20	5	Reg. Pref.	9th	
2020–21	5	Reg. Pref.	2nd	

Season	Tier	Division	Place	Copa del Rey
2021–22	6	Reg. Pref.	4th	
2022–23	6	Reg. Pref.	11th	
2023–24	7	1ª Reg.	4th	
2024–25	7	1ª Reg.	5th	
2025–26	7	1ª Reg.		
