= Alberto Vaquero =

Spanish footballer

Personal information
- Full name: Alberto Vaquero Aguilar
- Date of birth: 12 November 2002 (age 24)
- Place of birth: Zaragoza, Spain
- Height: 1.85 m (6 ft 1 in)
- Position: Midfielder

Team information
- Current team: Tarazona
- Number: 22

Youth career
- Oliver
- 2015–2016: Villarreal
- 2016–2017: Oliver
- 2017–2020: El Olivar
- 2020–2021: Zaragoza

Senior career*
Years	Team	Apps	(Gls)
2021–2024	Zaragoza B	72	(7)
2023–2025	Zaragoza	4	(0)
2024–2025	→ Lugo (loan)	27	(0)
2025–	Tarazona	26	(1)
- * Club domestic league appearances and goals as of 10 June 2026

Alberto Vaquero Aguilar (born 12 November 2002) is a Spanish footballer who plays as a midfielder for Primera Federación club Tarazona.

== Career ==
Born in Zaragoza, Aragon, Vaquero began his career with hometown side CD Oliver before joining Villarreal CF's youth categories at the age of 12. He left the club after one year, subsequently returning to Oliver and representing EM El Olivar before joining Real Zaragoza's youth sides in 2020.

Vaquero made his senior debut with the reserves on 12 September 2021, starting in a 1–0 Tercera División RFEF away loss to CF Épila. He scored his first senior goal on 28 November, netting the B's third in a 3–1 home win over Utebo FC, and scored a further four times during the campaign as the side achieved promotion to Segunda Federación.

Vaquero made his first team debut on 30 October 2023, coming on as a second-half substitute for Víctor Mollejo in a 1–1 Segunda División away draw with Burgos CF. The following 26 July, he was loaned to Primera Federación side CD Lugo for the season.

== Personal life ==
Vaquero's grandfather Fernando was also a footballer and a midfielder. He appeared in six matches in the second division with Sporting de Gijón in the 1961–62 season.
