= Andrés Borge =

Spanish footballer (born 2001)

Personal information
- Full name: Andrés Borge Martín
- Date of birth: 23 October 2001 (age 25)
- Place of birth: Binéfar, Spain
- Height: 1.81 m (5 ft 11 in)
- Position: Right back

Team information
- Current team: Tarazona
- Number: 14

Youth career
- 2008–2018: Binéfar
- 2018–2020: Zaragoza

Senior career*
Years	Team	Apps	(Gls)
2019–2024	Zaragoza B	59	(2)
2019–2025	Zaragoza	11	(0)
2025	→ Arenteiro (loan)	16	(0)
2025–	Tarazona	33	(0)
- * Club domestic league appearances and goals as of 10 June 2026

Andrés Borge Martín (born 23 October 2001) is a Spanish footballer who plays as a right back for Primera Federación club Tarazona.

== Career ==
Born in Binéfar, Huesca, Aragon, Borge joined Real Zaragoza's youth setup on 24 June 2018, from hometown side CD Binéfar. He made his senior debut with the reserves on 13 October 2019, starting in a 3–3 Tercera División away draw against CD Valdefierro.

On 17 December 2019, Borge made his made his first team debut by starting in a 1–0 away win against UD Socuéllamos, for the season's Copa del Rey; along with fellow debutant Alejandro Francés, both became the first players of the 21st century to appear for the club. In December of the following year, he suffered a serious knee injury, being sidelined for the remainder of the campaign.

Borge continued to play with the B's upon returning, and helped in their promotion to Segunda Federación in 2022. He made his professional debut on 25 September 2023, playing the full 90 minutes in a 1–0 Segunda División away loss to Racing de Ferrol.

On 26 December 2023, Borge renewed his contract with the Maños until 2027. The following 29 February, he suffered another knee injury which sidelined him for the remainder of the campaign.

On 11 January 2025, Borge was loaned to Primera Federación side CD Arenteiro for the remainder of the season.
