= Víctor García (footballer, born May 1994) =

Spanish footballer

Personal information
- Full name: Víctor García Marín
- Date of birth: 31 May 1994 (age 32)
- Place of birth: L'Hospitalet, Spain
- Height: 1.80 m (5 ft 11 in)
- Positions: Wing-back; winger

Youth career
- Cornellà
- 2012–2013: Espanyol

Senior career*
Years	Team	Apps	(Gls)
2012	Cornellà	1	(0)
2013–2014	Prat	19	(1)
2014–2015	Tenerife B	20	(4)
2014–2016	Tenerife	9	(1)
2015–2016	→ Pobla Mafumet (loan)	30	(0)
2016–2017	Badalona	33	(2)
2017–2018	UCAM Murcia	26	(0)
2018–2019	Ebro	29	(2)
2019–2021	Castellón	50	(1)
2021–2023	Śląsk Wrocław	53	(1)
2023–2026	Málaga	70	(0)
- * Club domestic league appearances and goals as of 3 June 2026

Víctor García Marín (born 31 May 1994) is a Spanish professional footballer who plays either as a left wing-back or a left winger.

== Club career ==
Born in L'Hospitalet de Llobregat, Barcelona, Catalonia, García made his senior debut with UE Cornellà in 2012, in the Tercera División. In July that year, he moved to RCD Espanyol to finish his youth career.

In the summer of 2013, García joined Segunda División B club AE Prat. He appeared in 19 matches during the season, and signed for CD Tenerife's reserves on 2 July 2014.

García made his professional debut on 14 December 2014, coming on as a second-half substitute in a 0–0 away draw against AD Alcorcón. He was handed his first start on 10 January 2015, also providing an assist for Diego Ifrán's goal in the 3–1 away loss to Real Betis.

On 22 February 2015, García scored his first goal in the second division, the last in a 2–0 home victory over Real Valladolid. He renewed his contract with the Canarians on 23 July, being immediately loaned to third-tier CF Pobla de Mafumet.

On 17 July 2016, after cutting ties with Tenerife, García moved to CF Badalona. He continued competing at that level in the following years, representing in quick succession UCAM Murcia CF, CD Ebro and CD Castellón.

From 2021 to 2023, García competed in the Polish Ekstraklasa with Śląsk Wrocław. He scored his only goal in top-flight football on 11 September 2021, in a 1–0 home win over Legia Warsaw.

García returned to Spain on 7 August 2023, on a two-year deal at Málaga CF as a free agent. He achieved promotion to the second tier at the end of his debut campaign, his second to that league after the one with Castellón in 2020.
