= Marcos Luna =

Spanish footballer

Personal information
- Full name: Marcos Luna Ruiz
- Date of birth: 5 April 2003 (age 23)
- Place of birth: Zaragoza, Spain
- Height: 1.83 m (6 ft 0 in)
- Position: Right-back

Team information
- Current team: Almería
- Number: 16

Youth career
- 2017–2022: Zaragoza

Senior career*
| Years | Team | Apps | (Gls) |
| 2022–2023 | Zaragoza B | 12 | (0) |
| 2022–2025 | Zaragoza | 35 | (2) |
| 2024 | → Real Unión (loan) | 18 | (0) |
| 2025– | Almería | 31 | (0) |
- * Club domestic league appearances and goals as of 3 June 2026

Marcos Luna Ruiz (born 5 April 2003) is a Spanish footballer who plays as a right-back for UD Almería.

== Club career ==
Born in Zaragoza, Aragón, Luna was a Real Zaragoza youth graduate. He made his senior debut with the reserves on 6 January 2022, starting in a 2–0 Tercera División RFEF away loss against CD Giner Torrero.

Called up to the first team for the 2022 pre-season, Luna made his professional debut on 15 October of that year, coming on as a late substitute for Fran Gámez in a 2–1 home win over Villarreal CF B in the Segunda División.

On 9 November 2022, Luna renewed his contract until 2026. On 17 January 2024, he agreed to join Primera Federación side Real Unión on loan for the remainder of the season.

Back to the Maños in July 2024, Luna scored his first professional goal on 16 August, netting his side's fourth in a 4–0 away routing of Cádiz CF. He was mainly a backup option to Iván Calero during the campaign, scoring twice in 28 appearances overall.

On 10 July 2025, Luna signed a five-year contract with UD Almería also in the second division.
