= UD Amistad =

Association football club in Spain

Amistad
- Full name: Unión Deportiva Amistad
- Founded: 1939; 87 years ago (as Racing Club San José); 1975 (refounded)
- Ground: Puente de Santiago, Zaragoza; Aragon, Spain
- President: Ángel Hervás
- League: Liga Nacional Juvenil
- 2023–24: Liga Nacional Juvenil – Group 6, 12th of 18
- Website: www.udamistad.es
Home colours

Unión Deportiva Amistad is a Spanish football team based in Zaragoza, in the autonomous community of Aragon. Founded in 1939 as Racing Club San José, the club was dissolved in 1964, but was refounded in 1975. They are now dedicated to youth football.

After the refoundation in 1975, the club also had a senior men's team playing in the regional leagues in the 1970s, while a senior women's team played in the regional leagues. They were also a farm team of Real Zaragoza in the 1950s and 1960s.

== History ==
=== Club background ===
- Racing Club San José (1939–1941)
- Club Deportivo San José (1941–1948)
- Unión Deportiva Amistad (1948–1964; 1975–)

== Season to season ==
Season	Tier	Division	Place	Copa del Rey
1940–41	6	3ª Reg.	1st	
1941–42	6	3ª Reg.	3rd	
1942–43	4	2ª Reg.	5th	
1943–44	DNP			
1944–45	DNP			
1945–46	5	2ª Reg.	5th	
1946–47	5	2ª Reg.	2nd	
1947–48	4	1ª Reg.	4th	
1948–49	4	1ª Reg.	4th	
1949–50	4	1ª Reg.	2nd	
1950–51	4	1ª Reg.	2nd	
1951–52	4	1ª Reg.	1st	
1952–53	3	3ª	11th	
1953–54	3	3ª	13th	
1954–55	3	3ª	7th	
1955–56	3	3ª	1st	

Season	Tier	Division	Place	Copa del Rey
1956–57	3	3ª	6th	
1957–58	3	3ª	2nd	
1958–59	3	3ª	1st	
1959–60	3	3ª	1st	
1960–61	3	3ª	1st	
1961–62	3	3ª	3rd	
1962–63	3	3ª	6th	
1963–64	3	3ª	9th	
1964–1975	DNP			
1975–76	8	3ª Reg.	8th	
1976–77	8	3ª Reg.	13th	
1977–78	DNP			
1978–79	8	3ª Reg.	8th	
1979–1989	DNP			
1989–90	6	1ª Reg.	(R)	

- 12 seasons in Tercera División

== Famous players ==
Note: List consists of players who appeared in La Liga or reached international status.

- (Equatorial Guinea) Jannick Buyla
- (Spain) Raúl Goni
- (Spain) Roberto López
- (Spain) José García Traid
- (Spain) Moreno
- (Spain) Jorge Pombo
