= Carlos Nieto (footballer) =

Spanish footballer

Personal information
- Full name: Carlos Nieto Herrero
- Date of birth: 6 May 1996 (age 30)
- Place of birth: Zaragoza, Spain
- Height: 1.81 m (5 ft 11 in)
- Position: Left back

Team information
- Current team: Tarazona
- Number: 21

Youth career
- Zaragoza

Senior career*
Years	Team	Apps	(Gls)
2014–2018	Zaragoza B	114	(9)
2014–2025	Zaragoza	147	(2)
2025–	Tarazona	26	(0)
- * Club domestic league appearances and goals as of 10 June 2026

Carlos Nieto Herrero (born 6 May 1996) is a Spanish footballer who plays for Primera Federación club Tarazona. Mainly a left back, he also plays as a central defender or midfielder.

== Career ==
Born in Zaragoza, Nieto graduated from local Real Zaragoza's youth setup, and made his senior debuts with the reserves in the 2013–14 campaign, while still a junior, in Tercera División. In the 2014 summer he was definitely promoted to the B-team, now in Segunda División B.

On 14 September 2014 Nieto played his first match as a professional, starting in a 1–1 home draw against CE Sabadell FC in the Segunda División championship. He would resume his spell mainly with the B-side in the following campaigns, achieving promotion from Tercera División in 2017.

On 1 August 2018, Nieto extended his contract until 2022 and was definitely promoted to the main squad. He scored his first professional goal on 8 April of the following year, netting his team's third in a 3–3 away draw against Cádiz CF.

On 27 June 2025, Nieto left Zaragoza after 18 years at the club.
