= SD Tarazona =

Association football club in Spain

Tarazona
- Full name: Sociedad Deportiva Tarazona
- Nicknames: Turiasonenses; Rojillos
- Founded: 1969
- Dissolved: 3 August 2026
- Ground: Municipal, Tarazona, Aragon, Spain
- Capacity: 1,500
- President: Aniceto Navarro
- Head coach: Juanma
- 2025–26: Primera Federación – Group 1, 17th of 20 (relegated; administrative relegation)
Home colours	Away colours

Sociedad Deportiva Tarazona was a Spanish football team based in Tarazona, in the autonomous community of Aragon. Founded in 1969, it holding home games was Municipal, with a 1,500-seat capacity.

== History ==
The club was founded in 1969 as Club de Fútbol Eureka, being renamed to Club Recreativo Cultural Eureka in 1973 and Club de Fútbol Eureka-Tarazona in 1975. In 1977, it changed to its current name Sociedad Deportiva Tarazona.

The club became champion of the Tercera División, Group 17 in the 2018-19 season.

== Season to season ==
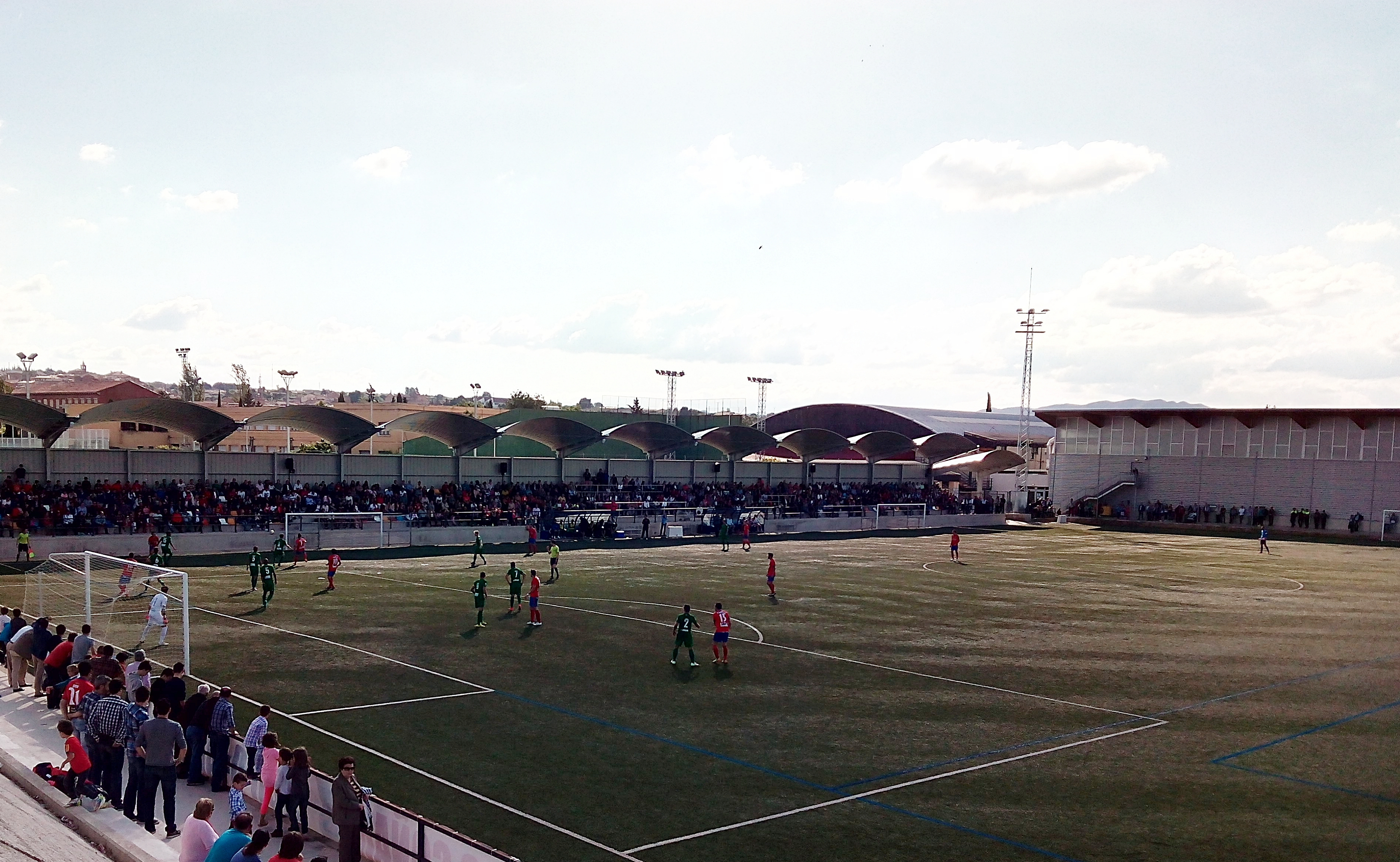
2015 Tercera División play-offs game against Atlético Levante.

- As C. R. C. Eureka

Season	Tier	Division	Place	Copa del Rey
1969–70	6	2ª Reg.		
1970–71	6	2ª Reg.		
1971–72	6	2ª Reg.		
1972–73	5	1ª Reg.	1st	
1973–74	4	Reg. Pref.	14th	
1974–75	4	Reg. Pref.	11th	
1975–76	4	Reg. Pref.	7th	
1976–77	4	Reg. Pref.	19th	

- As S. D. Tarazona

Season	Tier	Division	Place	Copa del Rey
1977–78	5	Reg. Pref.	7th	
1978–79	5	Reg. Pref.	3rd	
1979–80	5	Reg. Pref.	2nd	
1980–81	4	3ª	9th	
1981–82	4	3ª	15th	
1982–83	4	3ª	13th	
1983–84	4	3ª	12th	
1984–85	4	3ª	18th	
1985–86	5	Reg. Pref.	6th	
1986–87	4	3ª	19th	
1987–88	5	Reg. Pref.	2nd	
1988–89	4	3ª	14th	
1989–90	4	3ª	16th	
1990–91	4	3ª	18th	
1991–92	5	Reg. Pref.	7th	
1992–93	5	Reg. Pref.	1st	
1993–94	4	3ª	13th	
1994–95	4	3ª	19th	
1995–96	5	Reg. Pref.	2nd	
1996–97	5	Reg. Pref.	13th	

Season	Tier	Division	Place	Copa del Rey
1997–98	5	Reg. Pref.	17th	
1998–99	6	1ª Reg.	2nd	
1999–2000	5	Reg. Pref.	8th	
2000–01	5	Reg. Pref.	6th	
2001–02	5	Reg. Pref.	8th	
2002–03	5	Reg. Pref.	13th	
2003–04	5	Reg. Pref.	12th	
2004–05	5	Reg. Pref.	10th	
2005–06	5	Reg. Pref.	4th	
2006–07	5	Reg. Pref.	5th	
2007–08	5	Reg. Pref.	5th	
2008–09	5	Reg. Pref.	4th	
2009–10	5	Reg. Pref.	3rd	
2010–11	4	3ª	12th	
2011–12	4	3ª	14th	
2012–13	4	3ª	8th	
2013–14	4	3ª	6th	
2014–15	4	3ª	4th	
2015–16	4	3ª	4th	
2016–17	4	3ª	2nd	

Season	Tier	Division	Place	Copa del Rey
2017–18	4	3ª	4th	First round
2018–19	4	3ª	1st	
2019–20	4	3ª	1st	First round
2020–21	3	2ª B	6th	
2021–22	4	2ª RFEF	11th	
2022–23	4	2ª Fed.	3rd	
2023–24	3	1ª Fed.	13th	First round
2024–25	3	1ª Fed.	6th	
2025–26	3	1ª Fed.	17th	First round

- 3 seasons in Primera Federación
- 1 season in Segunda División B
- 2 seasons in Segunda Federación/Segunda División RFEF
- 21 seasons in Tercera División

== Current squad ==
As of 6 February 2026

Note: Flags indicate national team as defined under FIFA eligibility rules; some limited exceptions apply. Players may hold more than one non-FIFA nationality.

No.	Pos.	Nation	Player
1	GK	ESP	Josele Martínez
2	DF	ESP	Ángel López
3	DF	ESP	Chechu Martínez
4	DF	ESP	Marc Trilles
5	DF	ESP	Bakary Traoré (on loan from Elche)
6	MF	ESP	Óscar Carrasco (on loan from Eibar)
7	FW	ESP	David Soto
8	MF	ESP	Toni Ramón
9	FW	ESP	David Cubillas
10	FW	ESP	Agüero

No.	Pos.	Nation	Player
13	GK	ESP	Alejandro Fernández
14	DF	ESP	Andrés Borge
15	MF	ESP	Imanol Alonso
16	DF	ESP	Julián Delmás
17	FW	ESP	Álvaro Jiménez
19	FW	ESP	Sergi Armero
20	MF	ESP	Juan Pablo Martínez
21	DF	ESP	Carlos Nieto
22	MF	ESP	Alberto Vaquero
23	MF	ESP	Busi
