= Fran Gámez =

Spanish footballer

Personal information
- Full name: Francisco Gámez López
- Date of birth: 27 July 1991 (age 35)
- Place of birth: Sagunto, Spain
- Height: 1.74 m (5 ft 9 in)
- Position: Right-back

Team information
- Current team: Albacete
- Number: 15

Youth career
- 2009–2010: Acero

Senior career*
Years	Team	Apps	(Gls)
2010–2013	Acero	?	(6)
2013–2018	Saguntino	161	(21)
2018–2021	Mallorca	75	(1)
2021–2024	Zaragoza	104	(2)
2024–2025	Eldense	34	(0)
2025–	Albacete	36	(0)
- * Club domestic league appearances and goals as of 9 June 2026

Francisco "Fran" Gámez López (born 27 July 1991) is a Spanish footballer who plays for Albacete Balompié. Mainly a right-back, he can also play as a right winger.

== Club career ==
Born in Sagunto, Valencian Community, Gámez was a CD Acero youth graduate. He made his first team debut in the 2010–11 season, in the regional leagues.

On 16 June 2013, Gámez signed for Tercera División side Atlético Saguntino. An undisputed starter, he scored a career-best 11 goals during the 2015–16 season, achieving promotion to Segunda División B; he also acted as team captain during the most of his spell.

On 30 January 2018, Gámez signed a two-and-a-half-year deal with RCD Mallorca also in the third division, after the club activated his € 30,000 buyout clause. He contributed with one goal in seven appearances, as his side achieved promotion to Segunda División after a one-year absence.

Gámez made his professional debut on 19 August 2018, starting in a 1–0 home win against CA Osasuna. He scored his first professional goal on 29 September, in a 1–1 away draw against CD Lugo, and finished the campaign as a starter as the club reached another promotion.

Gámez made his La Liga debut on 29 September 2019, starting in a 0–2 away loss against Deportivo Alavés. He lost his starting spot to Lumor Agbenyenu during the season as his side suffered relegation, and was also a backup option to Brian Oliván in 2020–21, as the club returned to the top tier.

On 15 July 2021, Gámez signed a two-year contract with Real Zaragoza in the second division. On 27 June 2024, he moved to CD Eldense in the same category on a two-year deal.

On 10 July 2025, after suffering relegation, Gámez agreed to a one-year contract with Albacete Balompié still in division two.
