= Francho Serrano =

Spanish footballer

Personal information
- Full name: Francho Serrano Gracia
- Date of birth: 17 October 2001 (age 25)
- Place of birth: Zaragoza, Spain
- Height: 1.80 m (5 ft 11 in)
- Position: Midfielder

Team information
- Current team: Getafe
- Number: 16

Youth career
- 2015–2020: Zaragoza

Senior career*
| Years | Team | Apps | (Gls) |
| 2019–2020 | Zaragoza B | 2 | (0) |
| 2020–2026 | Zaragoza | 191 | (12) |
| 2026– | Getafe | 1 | (0) |

International career^{‡}
| 2020 | Spain U19 | 1 | (0) |
| 2021 | Spain U21 | 2 | (0) |
- * Club domestic league appearances and goals as of 23 August 2026 ‡ National team caps and goals as of 14 December 2021

Francho Serrano Gracía (born 17 October 2001) is a Spanish footballer who plays as a central midfielder for La Liga club Getafe CF.

== Club career ==
=== Zaragoza ===
Born in Zaragoza, Aragon, and joined Real Zaragoza's youth setup in 2015, aged 13. He made his senior debut with the reserves on 14 December 2019, starting in a 2–1 Tercera División home win against CD Brea.

On 23 March 2020, Serrano renewed his contract until 2024 and was definitely promoted to the first team for the 2020–21 season. He made his professional debut on 1 November, starting in a 0–0 home draw against RCD Mallorca in the Segunda División championship.

Serrano scored his first senior goal on 16 December 2020, netting the second in a 2–0 away win against Gimnástica de Torrelavega, for the season's Copa del Rey. On 10 June 2022, already established as a regular starter, he renewed his contract until 2025.

On 26 May 2025, Serrano further extended his link until 2030.

=== Getafe ===
On 18 August 2026, after Zaragoza's relegation, Serrano joined La Liga side Getafe CF on a three-year contract. He made his debut in the category five days later, starting in a 1–0 home win over Racing de Santander.
