= Real Sociedad Cantera =

Real Sociedad (youth system)
- Full name: Real Sociedad de Fútbol, S.A.D.
- Nickname(s): Txuriurdin (White and Blue); Erreala / La Real (The Royals)
- Ground: Zubieta Facilities, San Sebastián, Basque Country, Spain
- Capacity: 2,500
- President: Jokin Aperribay
- Coach: Jon Mikel Arrieta
- League: División de Honor
- 2018–19: División de Honor, Gr. 2, 2nd
Home colours	Away colours

The cantera (quarry) of Spanish professional football club Real Sociedad is the organization's youth academy, developing players from childhood through to the integration of the best prospects into the adult teams.

The final category within the youth structure is the Juvenil A (Basque: Gazteak A) under-18/19 team which represents the club in national competition. The successful graduates then usually move to the club's reserve teams, Real Sociedad C or Real Sociedad B, which are also considered part of the cantera due to being a stage in progression towards the senior team, albeit competing in the adult league system.

The academy is based at the club training complex, Zubieta, which is often the metonym used to refer to the system itself.

== Background and structure ==
The top football clubs in the Spanish leagues generally place great importance in developing their cantera to promote the players from within or sell to other clubs as a source of revenue, and Real Sociedad is no exception. Until the late 1980s, the club operated a Basque-only player recruitment policy but abandoned this in order to remain competitive; however their youth recruitment network is still focused around their home province of Gipuzkoa and there are collaboration agreements in place with the small clubs in the region, assisted financially by the regional government. In 2013, it was noted that 22 of the 23 members of the Juvenil A squad that season were from Gipuzkoa.

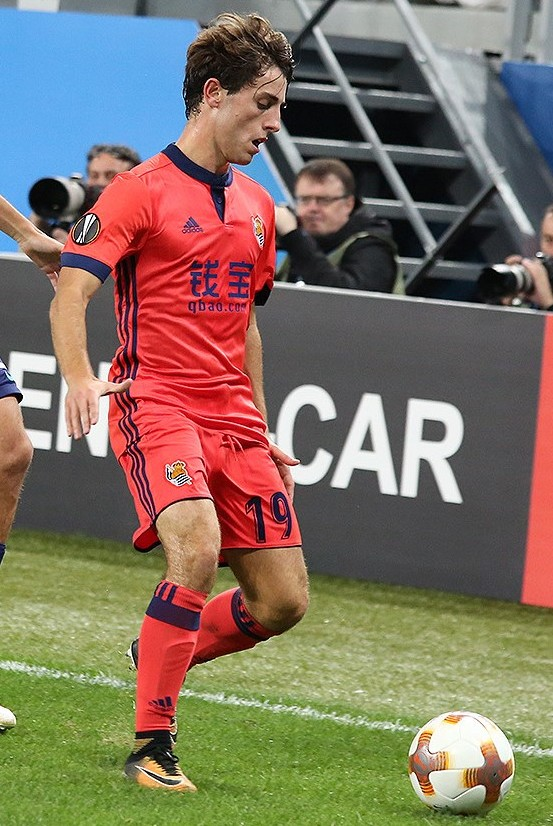
Álvaro Odriozola is a recent example of a player who joined the club at a young age, moved through the youth levels and established himself in the senior team

Real Sociedad's good standing in La Liga after being promoted back in 2010 – including qualifying for the 2013–14 UEFA Champions League – was achieved using a large proportion of homegrown players, with the vast majority of those hailing from the local province (which has a population of 715,000, a small catchment area for an elite football club, and with that potential pool of talent drained further by Athletic Bilbao also considering it a primary recruitment area), indicating a high standard of coaching and development of the young players at their disposal.

A large proportion of the senior team players across the 2010s were youth academy graduates: 15 of the squad in 2014 (as per analysis from the CIES Football Observatory). In 2016, Real Sociedad's total of 16 'homegrown players' (as per UEFA guidelines: three years of training between 15 and 21 years old) still at their formative club was the second-highest across Europe's 'big five' leagues, significantly more than all other elite clubs apart from neighbours Athletic Bilbao. Moreover, further end-of-year analysis demonstrated that these graduates were not merely backup squad members but integral elements of the team, involved in 50% of the minutes in the 2016–17 La Liga, where they finished 6th. With the inclusion of nine former trainees at other eligible clubs, Real's total of 25 homegrown players ranked as the fifth-highest across the continent, although only third in Spain behind Real Madrid and FC Barcelona who retained just a few of the many high-level professionals they produced. The senior team qualified for the Champions League again in the 2022–23 La Liga season, using a squad containing some high-quality talent from various locations but with a strong Zubieta identity at its heart.

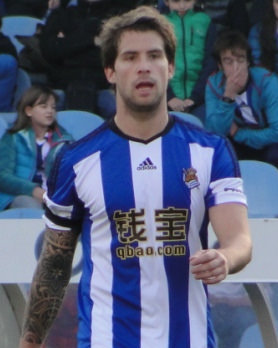
Youth graduate Iñigo Martínez's departure in 2018 earned the club a €32 million fee.

Having been monitored at partner teams, a core of boys from the Gipuzkoa province are first introduced into Infantil level of the Zubieta system at around 12 years of age – this is later then most other clubs in Spain who typically have Benjamín (under 9/10) and/or Alevín (under 11/12) groups – and advance every season through Cadete and Juvenil levels. The players who are retained by Real after their Juvenil A spell (aged about 17) would typically join Real Sociedad C – a 2016 addition to the club structure – with that squad normally augmented further with some signings from the region's youth clubs such as Antiguoko, a small San Sebastián team who regularly challenge the professional youth teams for the title in their División de Honor group. The players usually spend one or two seasons at Real C before the best are promoted to the reserve team Sanse and then on to the senior team when considered ready to do so.

A notable exception to this local focus was Antoine Griezmann from eastern France who was integrated into the setup at a young age after his potential was identified by Real staff at an event; in 2014 he left the club for a transfer fee of €30 million. In addition to Griezmann, the Real Sociedad youth system produced three other players during the 2010s who commanded large transfer windfalls when they departed: Asier Illarramendi moved to Real Madrid in July 2013 for €32.2 million only to return two years later for around half that amount; in January 2018, Iñigo Martínez signed for rivals Athletic Bilbao after they paid his €32 million release clause fee; in July of that year, Álvaro Odriozola also moved to Real Madrid for a fee reported to be €30 million plus €5 million of conditional add-ons.

After a period in the early 2020s without further big sales but with onfield success at senior level under head coach Imanol Alguacil (himself a product of the academy as both a player and staff member who integrated numerous canteranos into his squads), the sale of homegrown Martín Zubimendi in the summer of 2025 brought an income of around €60 million into the club. That year the B-team, composed almost entirely of academy graduates, were promoted to the Segunda División, which they had also achieved in 2021.

== National competitions ==
The Juvenil A team play in Group II of the División de Honor Juvenil de Fútbol as their regular annual competition. Their main rivals in the league group are Athletic Bilbao and Osasuna. The under-17 team, Juvenil B or Easo (named after a nickname for San Sebastián which itself derives from the nearby Roman town of Oiasso), plays in the Liga Nacional Juvenil de Fútbol which is the lower division of the same structure.

The team also regularly participates in the Copa de Campeones and the Copa del Rey Juvenil, qualification for which is dependent on final league group position. In these nationwide competitions the opposition includes the academy teams of Barcelona, Atlético Madrid, Sevilla and Real Madrid.

== International tournaments ==
In 2012–13 Real Sociedad's senior team qualified for the UEFA Champions League group stages, meaning that the Juvenil squad could play in the 2013–14 version of the UEFA Youth League. They finished top of their group in the competition but were eliminated from the knockout stage by Schalke 04.

Over the next decade there was no further chance to participate due to the senior team failing to qualify (the alternative route into the Youth League would be to win the previous season's Copa de Campeones but Real Juvenil were unable to achieve this). The next qualification, as a result of the senior team's Champions League qualification, was in 2023–24: the youths finished bottom of a tough group which included Benfica and Red Bull Salzburg, whose consistent strength at academy level was indicated by their meetings in the final of the tournament in both 2016–17 and 2021–22.

=== Head coaches ===
The coaches are often former Real players who themselves graduated from Zubieta, which is also true of Loren Juarros, the club's former director of football who held the post from 2009 until 2018. In 2023, it was observed that several of Europe's elite club managers were from Gipuzkoa and experienced the Real Sociedad cantera system as players (although not all were involved in coaching at their formative club).

Squad	Age	Coach	Tier	League
Juvenil A	16-18	Jon Mikel Arrieta	1	División de Honor (Gr. II)
Easo	16-17	Unai Gazpio	2	Liga Nacional (Gr. IV)
Cadete A	15-16	Gorka Valle	1	Cadete Liga Vasca
Cadete Txiki	14-15	Egoitz Etxarri	2	Cadete División de Honor

== Season to season (Juvenil A) ==
=== Superliga / Liga de Honor sub-19 ===
Seasons with two or more trophies shown in bold

Season	Level	Group	Position	Copa del Rey Juvenil	Notes
1986–87	1	N/A	14th	N/A	Relegated
1987–88	2	2	1st	N/A	4th in playoff group, not promoted
1988–89	2	2	1st	N/A	2nd in playoff group, not promoted
1989–90	2	2	1st	N/A	1st in playoff group, not promoted
1990–91	2	2	1st	N/A	1st in playoff group, not promoted
1991–92	2	2	2nd	N/A	1st in playoff group, not promoted
1992–93	2	2	1st	N/A	2nd in playoff group, not promoted
1993–94	2	2	2nd	N/A	
1994–95	2	2	2nd	N/A	No promotion due to restructuring

=== División de Honor Juvenil ===
Seasons with two or more trophies shown in bold

*Season*	Level	Group	Position	Copa del Rey Juv.	Copa de Campeones	Europe/notes
1995–96	1	2	2nd	Quarter-final	N/A	—
1996–97	1	2	1st	Quarter-final	3rd in group of 3	—
**1997–98**	1	2	**1st**	Round of 16	**Winners**	—
**1998–99**	1	2	**1st**	Round of 16	**Winners**	—
1999–00	1	2	3rd	Round of 16	N/A	—
2000–01	1	2	4th	N/A	N/A	—
2001–02	1	2	2nd	Quarter-final	N/A	—
2002–03	1	2	4th	N/A	N/A	—
2003–04	1	2	2nd	Quarter-final	N/A	—
2004–05	1	2	4th	N/A	N/A	—
2005–06	1	2	3rd	Quarter-final	N/A	—
2006–07	1	2	2nd	Semi-final	N/A	—
2007–08	1	2	1st	Quarter-final	3rd in group of 3	—
2008–09	1	2	2nd	Round of 16	N/A	—
2009–10	1	2	2nd	Round of 16	N/A	—
2010–11	1	2	2nd	Round of 16	N/A	—
2011–12	1	2	1st	Quarter-final	Quarter-final	N/A
2012–13	1	2	4th	N/A	N/A	N/A
2013–14	1	II	1st	Quarter-final	Runners-up	1st in group, Round of 16
2014–15	1	II	1st	Quarter-final	Quarter-final	N/A
2015–16	1	II	5th	N/A	N/A	N/A
2016–17	1	II	4th	N/A	N/A	N/A
2017–18	1	II	2nd	Quarter-final	N/A	N/A
2018–19	1	II	2nd	Quarter-final	N/A	N/A
2019–20 (Note: In March 2020, all fixtures were suspended due to the COVID-19 pandemic in Spain. On 6 May 2020, the Royal Spanish Football Federation announced the premature end of the leagues, revoking all relegations, declaring each divisional leader as champion and cancelling the Copa del Rey Juvenil and the Copa de Campeones for the season.)	1	II	2nd	N/A	N/A	N/A
2020–21	1	II-B/C	4th/6th	N/A (Note: Copa del Rey Juvenil not held in 2020–21.)	N/A	N/A (Note: UEFA Youth League not held in 2020–21.)
2021–22	1	II	5th	N/A	N/A	N/A
2022–23	1	II	2nd	Round of 32	N/A	N/A
2023–24	1	II	3rd	Round of 32	N/A	4th in group
2024–25	1	II	3rd	Round of 32	N/A	N/A

== Honours ==
- División de Honor (Group II): (regional league)
  - 2 1982 (Liga Nacional Juvenil 1975 to 1986)
  - 7 1997, 1998, 1999, 2008, 2012, 2014, 2015 (current format since 1995)
- Copa de Campeones Juvenil:
  - Winners: 2 1998, 1999
  - Runners-up: 2014
- Copa del Rey Juvenil:
  - Winners: 1 1955
  - Runners-up: 1952, 1968

== Notable graduates ==
The club's purpose-built training centre and academy at Zubieta dates from 1982, but special mention should be given to the generation of players who emerged just prior to its opening: Real Sociedad were La Liga winners in 1981 and 1982 with a playing squad filled with homegrown talent (not all players were developed from childhood, but those who did arrive later were acquired from the region's local clubs in their teens or early 20s and improved further). A group comprising Luis Arconada, Genaro Zelaieta, Inaxio Kortabarria, Juan Antonio Larrañaga, Alberto Górriz, Gaztelu, Periko Alonso, José Diego, Roberto López Ufarte, Peio Uralde, José Mari Bakero, Jesús María Zamora and Jesús María Satrústegui all became Spanish internationals.

Since that successful era, many more players have emerged from the youth system to star for the Real Sociedad first team or play elsewhere at a high level, including:

As of July 2025 – players currently at Real Sociedad in bold, 'graduation' year in parentheses

- Alberto Albstegui (1982)
- Txiki Begiristain (1982)
- Miguel Fuentes (1983)
- Luciano Iturrino (1983)
- Loren (1984)
- Javier Bengoetxea (1985)
- David Villabona (1986)
- Alberto (1987)
- José Antonio Pikabea (1988)
- Mikel Lasa (1988)
- Mikel Roteta (1988)
- Imanol Alguacil (1989)
- Bittor Alkiza (1990)
- Andoni Imaz (1990)
- Agustín Aranzábal (1992)
- Javier de Pedro (1992)
- Iñigo Idiakez (1992)
- Aitor López Rekarte (1994)
- Joseba Etxeberria (1994)
- Mikel Aranburu (1996)
- José Javier Barkero (1996)
- Igor Gabilondo (1997)
- Joseba Llorente (1998)
- Mikel Labaka (1999)
- Mikel Alonso (1999)
- Gari Uranga (2000)
- Xabi Alonso (2000)
- Asier Riesgo (2001)
- Javier Garrido (2001)
- Gorka Larrea (2002)
- Xabi Prieto (2002)
- Iñigo Díaz de Cerio (2003)
- Markel Bergara (2003)
- Xabier Castillo (2004)
- Imanol Agirretxe (2004)
- Mikel González (2004)
- Carlos Martínez (2004)
- Gorka Elustondo (2005)
- Dani Estrada (2005)
- Manu García (2005)
- David Zurutuza (2005)
- Mikel Balenziaga (2006)
- Borja Viguera (2006)
- Asier Illarramendi (2008)
- Iñigo Martínez (2009)
- Dani García (2009)
- Antoine Griezmann (2009)
- Rúben Pardo (2010)
- Joseba Zaldúa (2010)
- Kenan Kodro (2011)
- **Aritz Elustondo** (2012)
- Jon Bautista (2013)
- **Mikel Oyarzabal** (2014)
- **Álvaro Odriozola** (2014)
- Andoni Gorosabel (2014)
- **Igor Zubeldia** (2015)
- **Aihen Muñoz** (2015)
- Ander Guevara (2015)
- Martín Zubimendi (2016)
- **Ander Barrenetxea** (2018)
- **Jon Pacheco** (2018)
- **Jon Ander Olasagasti** (2018)
- **Beñat Turrientes** (2019)
- **Pablo Marín** (2020)

== See also ==
- Real Sociedad senior team
- Real Sociedad B, 'Sanse' 1st reserve team
- Real Sociedad C 2nd reserve team
