= 2011–12 División de Honor Juvenil de Fútbol =

División de Honor Juvenil de Fútbol
- Season: 2011–12

The 2011–12 División de Honor Juvenil de Fútbol season is the 26th since its establishment. The regular season began in September 2011, and ended in April 2012.

== Regular season ==
=== Group 1 ===
Pos	Team	Pld	W	D	L	GF	GA	GD	Pts	Qualification or relegation
1	Real Sporting	30	21	6	3	94	22	+72	69	Copa de Campeones
2	Real Racing Club	30	20	4	6	76	30	+46	64	Copa del Rey
3	RC Celta	30	19	6	5	66	24	+42	63	
4	Pontevedra CF	30	18	5	7	56	48	+8	59	
5	RC Deportivo	30	14	8	8	63	37	+26	50	
6	Atlético Perines	30	14	5	11	48	46	+2	47	
7	Pabellón CF	30	13	7	10	51	44	+7	46	
8	CD Lugo	30	12	6	12	39	53	−14	42	
9	RS Gimnástica	30	12	5	13	37	36	+1	41	
10	Real Oviedo	30	12	4	14	53	45	+8	40	
11	CD Roces	30	9	9	12	42	56	−14	36	
12	Rayo Cantabria	30	10	6	14	32	51	−19	36	
13	Puente Castro FC	30	9	6	15	41	60	−19	33	Relegation
14	Club Bansander	30	4	7	19	31	62	−31	19	Relegation
15	CD Conxo	30	5	4	21	24	69	−45	19	Relegation
16	Racing Club Ferrol	30	2	4	24	28	98	−70	10	Relegation

=== Group 2 ===
Pos	Team	Pld	W	D	L	GF	GA	GD	Pts	Qualification or relegation
1	Real Sociedad de Fútbol	30	21	3	6	65	30	+35	66	Copa de Campeones
2	Danok Bat CF	30	21	3	6	69	38	+31	66	Copa del Rey
3	Athletic Club	30	20	6	4	64	26	+38	66	Copa del Rey
4	Club Atlético Osasuna	30	19	3	8	65	34	+31	60	
5	CD Berceo	30	19	3	8	72	37	+35	60	
6	Deportivo Alavés	30	14	7	9	50	36	+14	49	
7	Stadium Casablanca	30	13	10	7	56	46	+10	49	
8	UDC Txantrea KKE	30	11	10	9	47	41	+6	43	
9	SD Eibar	30	10	10	10	42	48	−6	40	
10	CD Pamplona	30	10	7	13	43	56	−13	37	
11	SCD Durango	30	8	5	17	45	65	−20	29	
12	Santuchu FC	30	7	7	16	36	50	−14	28	
13	SD Leioa	30	7	3	20	32	53	−21	24	Relegation
14	Valvanera CD	30	4	9	17	45	72	−27	21	Relegation
15	Arenas Club	30	4	5	21	33	81	−48	17	Relegation
16	Barakaldo CF	30	4	5	21	31	82	−51	17	Relegation

=== Group 3 ===
Pos	Team	Pld	W	D	L	GF	GA	GD	Pts	Qualification or relegation
1	RCD Espanyol	30	24	5	1	72	16	+56	77	Copa de Campeones
2	FC Barcelona	30	24	4	2	78	22	+56	76	Copa de Campeones
3	Girona FC	30	17	2	11	44	34	+10	53	
4	Real Zaragoza	30	14	6	10	61	59	+2	48	
5	UD Cornellà	30	13	8	9	52	40	+12	47	
6	Gimnàstic de Tarragona	30	12	11	7	42	32	+10	47	
7	RCD Mallorca	30	11	10	9	38	27	+11	43	
8	CF Badalona	30	10	9	11	47	40	+7	39	
9	CD San Francisco	30	11	5	14	48	43	+5	38	
10	FPE Mataró	30	11	4	15	45	49	−4	37	
11	CF Damm	30	10	4	16	35	51	−16	34	
12	AEC Manlleu	30	9	4	17	35	59	−24	31	
13	SD Huesca	30	9	3	18	26	49	−23	30	Relegation
14	Club Lleida Esportiu	30	8	6	16	30	52	−22	30	Relegation
15	CD Cide	29	6	7	16	27	59	−32	25	Relegation
16	CF Reus Deportiu	29	5	2	22	30	78	−48	17	Relegation

=== Group 4 ===
Pos	Team	Pld	W	D	L	GF	GA	GD	Pts	Qualification or relegation
1	Sevilla FC	30	21	3	6	65	23	+42	66	Copa de Campeones
2	Málaga CF	30	19	6	5	65	26	+39	63	Copa del Rey
3	Real Betis Balompié	30	17	4	9	63	34	+29	55	
4	Granada CF	30	16	3	11	49	47	+2	51	
5	RC Recreativo	30	15	3	12	59	32	+27	48	
6	ADP Sevilla Este	30	13	6	11	49	48	+1	45	
7	Puerto Malagueño GI	30	12	8	10	47	45	+2	44	
8	Séneca CF	30	12	7	11	47	46	+1	43	
9	UD Almería	30	12	6	12	51	48	+3	42	
10	Coria CF	30	11	4	15	55	67	−12	37	
11	Córdoba CF	30	9	9	12	53	50	+3	36	
12	CD Santa Fe	30	10	5	15	35	48	−13	35	
13	Cádiz CF	30	9	8	13	32	53	−21	35	Relegation
14	CD Vázquez Cultural	30	9	8	13	43	54	−11	35	Relegation
15	CG Goyu-Ryu	30	5	6	19	31	89	−58	21	Relegation
16	UD DH San Andrés	30	4	6	20	42	76	−34	15 (Note: 3 points deducted?)	Relegation

=== Group 5 ===
Pos	Team	Pld	W	D	L	GF	GA	GD	Pts	Qualification or relegation
1	Club Atlético de Madrid	30	22	6	2	81	27	+54	72	Copa de Campeones
2	Rayo Vallecano	30	20	6	4	74	39	+35	66	Copa del Rey
3	Real Madrid CF	30	20	5	5	107	34	+73	65	Copa del Rey
4	CD Diocesano	30	17	6	7	75	52	+23	57	
5	Real Valladolid CF	30	17	6	7	56	33	+23	57	
6	CD Leganés	30	13	6	11	48	34	+14	45	
7	CD Numancia	30	10	10	10	45	45	0	40	
8	AD Unión Adarve	30	10	10	10	40	43	−3	40	
9	UD Salamanca	30	10	6	14	32	53	−21	36	
10	Getafe CF	30	9	8	13	37	46	−9	35	
11	CF Rayo Majadahonda	30	9	7	14	29	39	−10	34	
12	Las Rozas CF	30	9	5	16	38	59	−21	32	
13	CD San Fernando	30	9	4	17	44	76	−32	31	Relegation
14	CF Pozuelo de Alarcón	30	8	3	19	39	70	−31	27	Relegation
15	Zamora CF	30	4	6	20	31	76	−45	18	Relegation
16	CD Burgos Prom. 2000	30	4	4	22	30	80	−50	16	Relegation

=== Group 6 ===
Pos	Team	Pld	W	D	L	GF	GA	GD	Pts	Qualification or relegation
1	UD Las Palmas	30	23	4	3	95	23	+72	73	Copa de Campeones
2	CD Tenerife	30	19	6	5	87	31	+56	63	Copa del Rey
3	CD Sobradillo	30	17	6	7	64	44	+20	57	
4	CD Puerto Cruz	30	14	9	7	56	50	+6	51	
5	UD Vecindario	30	13	11	6	58	33	+25	50	
6	AD Huracán	30	15	5	10	68	42	+26	50	
7	CEF Puertos Las Palmas	30	14	5	11	52	47	+5	47	
8	Unión Viera CF	30	13	7	10	33	31	+2	46	
9	CD Herbania	30	13	5	12	46	46	0	44	
10	CD Teguise	30	12	6	12	43	50	−7	42	
11	CD Laguna	30	11	3	16	40	52	−12	36	
12	UD Telde	30	7	13	10	45	50	−5	34	
13	SD San José	30	7	5	18	24	67	−43	26	Relegation
14	UD Realejos	30	6	4	20	35	76	−41	22	Relegation
15	CD Victoria	30	4	6	20	26	67	−41	18	Relegation
16	CD Vallinámar	30	3	3	24	26	89	−63	12	Relegation

=== Group 7 ===
Pos	Team	Pld	W	D	L	GF	GA	GD	Pts	Qualification or relegation
1	Valencia CF	30	24	2	4	75	17	+58	74	Copa de Campeones
2	CD Roda	30	23	1	6	76	35	+41	70	Copa del Rey
3	Villarreal CF	30	19	5	6	83	39	+44	62	
4	Levante UD	30	17	6	7	55	33	+22	57	
5	Real Murcia CF	30	16	4	10	53	40	+13	52	
6	Hércules CF	30	16	3	11	51	40	+11	51	
7	Huracán Valencia CF	30	14	8	8	50	34	+16	50	
8	Atlético Madrileño CF	30	15	4	11	63	45	+18	49	
9	Albacete Balompié	30	10	9	11	43	45	−2	39	
10	CD Castellón	30	11	5	14	52	68	−16	38	
11	CF Crack´s	30	10	5	15	36	42	−6	35	
12	CF Torre Levante	30	10	2	18	43	64	−21	32	
13	Kelme CF	30	6	7	17	38	72	−34	25	Relegation
14	UD Quart de Poblet	30	7	0	23	34	76	−42	21	Relegation
15	Tomelloso CF	30	5	2	23	34	82	−48	17	Relegation
16	CD Cieza	30	3	5	22	35	89	−54	14	Relegation

== Copa de Campeones ==
=== Bracket ===
First Round
VII	Valencia CF	1
IV	Sevilla FC	3
Group A
I	Real Sporting	3
II	Real Sociedad	2
WC	FC Barcelona	1
III	RCD Espanyol	3
Group B
VI	UD Las Palmas	0
V	Atlético de Madrid	1

Second Round
IV	Sevilla FC	1
I	Real Sporting	1
III	RCD Espanyol	2
V	Atlético de Madrid	1

Final
IV	Sevilla FC	1
III	RCD Espanyol	0

=== Group A ===
==== 1st round ====
Team 1	Score	Team 2
Valencia CF	1 – 3	Sevilla FC
Real Sporting	3 – 2	Real Sociedad

30 April 2012

Valencia CF	1 – 3	Sevilla FC
Cantabia 66'		Joaquín García 5'; Medina 9' (o.g.); Jairo Morillas 51'

Ciudad de Lepe

30 April 2012

Real Sporting	3 – 2	Real Sociedad
Juan Mera 20' (pen.); Álex Serrano 34'; Raúl López 39'		Íker Hernández 60'; Lander 83'

Ciudad de Lepe
Referee: Alonso Vizuete Sánchez

==== 2nd round ====
Team 1	Score	Team 2
Sevilla FC	1–1 (10–9p)	Real Sporting

2 May 2012

Sevilla FC	1 – 1 (10–9 p)	Real Sporting
García-Manjarón 17'		Bustos 39'

Ciudad de Lepe

=== Group B ===
==== 1st round ====
Team 1	Score	Team 2
UD Las Palmas	0 – 1	Atlético Madrid
FC Barcelona	1 – 3	RCD Espanyol

30 April 2012

UD Las Palmas	0 – 1	Atlético Madrid
		Thomas 14'

Ciudad de Lepe

30 April 2012

FC Barcelona	1 – 3 (a.e.t.)	RCD Espanyol
Babunski 9'	Report	Bonilla 74'; Jafar 99', 110'

Ciudad de Lepe
Referee: Enrique Figuero Vázquez

==== 2nd round ====
Team 1	Score	Team 2
RCD Espanyol	2 – 1	Atlético Madrid

2 May 2012

RCD Espanyol	2 – 1	Atlético Madrid
Rufo 26'; Jafar 45'		Ian 2'

Ciudad de Lepe

=== Final ===
Team 1	Score	Team 2
Sevilla FC	1 – 0	RCD Espanyol

Copa de Campeones
winners
Sevilla FC

==== Details ====
5 May 2012
18:00

Sevilla	1 – 0	Espanyol
Jairo Morillas 55'	Report

Estadio Ciudad de Lepe, Lepe
Referee: Pedro Jesús Pérez Montera

Sevilla	Espanyol

SEVILLA:
GK	(Spain) Sergio Rico
DF	(Spain) Moisés
DF	(Bolivia) Branco
DF	(Spain) Dani
DF	(Spain) Javi Guerra
MF	(Guinea-Bissau) Beto	(substituted off) 78'
MF	(Spain) Cotán	(substituted off) 90'
MF	(Spain) Juanma
MF	(Spain) Joaquín
FW	(Spain) Jairo Morillas	(substituted off) 85'
FW	(Spain) Álex Rubio
Substitutes:
MF	(Spain) Enrique	(substituted on) 78'
MF	(Spain) Cristian	(substituted on) 90'
DF	(Spain) Modesto	(substituted on) 85'
Manager:

ESPANYOL:
GK	(Spain) Germán
DF	(Spain) Rubén Duarte	(substituted off) 61'
DF	(Spain) Bonilla
DF	(Spain) Héctor
DF	(Spain) Óscar Arroyo	(substituted off) 85'
MF	(Spain) Miravent
MF	(Spain) Joan Jordán
MF	(Spain) Gil	(substituted off) 82'
MF	(Spain) Kilian
FW	(Spain) Rufo
FW	(Ghana) Jafar
Substitutes:
DF	(Spain) Aitor	(substituted on) 61'
MF	(Spain) Albarrán	(substituted on) 85'
MF	(Spain) Juan Diego	(substituted on) 82'
Manager:

== See also ==
- 2012 Copa del Rey Juvenil
