= 2017–18 División de Honor Juvenil de Fútbol =

División de Honor Juvenil de Fútbol
- Season: 2017–18

The 2017–18 División de Honor Juvenil de Fútbol season is the 32nd since its establishment. The regular season begins on 3 September 2017 and ends on 8 April 2018.

== Competition format ==
- The champion of each group and the best runner-up will play in the 2018 Copa de Campeones and the Copa del Rey.
- The other six runners-up and the two best third-placed teams qualify for the Copa del Rey.
- In each group, at least four teams (thirteenth placed on down) will be relegated to Liga Nacional.
- The champion of the Copa de Campeones will get a place for the 2018–19 UEFA Youth League.

== League tables ==
=== Group I ===
Pos	Team	Pld	W	D	L	GF	GA	GD	Pts	Qualification or relegation
1	Sporting de Gijón	30	21	7	2	77	27	+50	70	Qualification to Copa de Campeones
2	Deportivo de La Coruña	30	21	5	4	83	22	+61	68	Qualification to Copa del Rey
3	Celta de Vigo	30	19	8	3	70	33	+37	65	
4	Racing de Santander	30	19	2	9	66	37	+29	59	
5	Oviedo	30	16	6	8	56	33	+23	54	
6	Roces	30	12	10	8	50	45	+5	46	
7	Bansander	30	13	5	12	59	58	+1	44	
8	Pontevedra	30	11	11	8	44	38	+6	44	
9	Lugo	30	11	7	12	34	46	−12	40	
10	Atlético Perines	30	10	8	12	32	45	−13	38	
11	Val Miñor	30	8	6	16	44	64	−20	30	
12	Alondras	30	7	6	17	38	61	−23	27	
13	Areosa	30	6	7	17	37	76	−39	25	Relegation to Liga Nacional
14	Llano 2000	30	5	8	17	33	59	−26	23	Relegation to Liga Nacional
15	Santiago de Compostela	30	4	6	20	31	65	−34	18	Relegation to Liga Nacional
16	Racing Vilalbés	30	4	4	22	29	74	−45	16	Relegation to Liga Nacional

Updated to match(es) played on 8 April 2018. Source:
Rules for classification: 1) Points; 2) Goal difference; 3) Number of goals scored

=== Group II ===
Pos	Team	Pld	W	D	L	GF	GA	GD	Pts	Qualification or relegation
1	Athletic Bilbao	30	22	4	4	92	45	+47	70	Qualification to Copa de Campeones
2	Real Sociedad	30	21	4	5	79	37	+42	67	Qualification to Copa del Rey
3	Alavés	30	17	7	6	79	38	+41	58	
4	Eibar	30	15	7	8	52	42	+10	52	
5	Danok Bat	30	13	9	8	53	39	+14	48	
6	Txantrea	30	13	7	10	57	50	+7	46	
7	San Juan	30	11	10	9	31	40	−9	43	
8	Antiguoko	30	8	13	9	43	47	−4	37	
9	Numancia	30	10	5	15	45	53	−8	35	
10	Osasuna	30	10	5	15	40	40	0	35	
11	Pamplona	30	8	10	12	40	53	−13	34	
12	Getxo	30	9	5	16	44	63	−19	32	
13	Hernani	30	8	7	15	46	63	−17	31	Relegation to Liga Nacional
14	Arenas	30	6	9	15	46	66	−20	27	Relegation to Liga Nacional
15	UD Logroñés	30	7	5	18	29	57	−28	26	Relegation to Liga Nacional
16	Varea	30	4	9	17	32	75	−43	21	Relegation to Liga Nacional

Updated to match(es) played on 8 April 2018. Source:
Rules for classification: 1) Points; 2) Goal difference; 3) Number of goals scored

=== Group III ===
Pos	Team	Pld	W	D	L	GF	GA	GD	Pts	Qualification or relegation
1	Barcelona	30	22	6	2	74	18	+56	72	Qualification to Copa de Campeones
2	Zaragoza	30	21	3	6	66	28	+38	66	Qualification to Copa del Rey
3	Mallorca	30	20	3	7	59	29	+30	63	
4	Girona	30	19	2	9	59	35	+24	59	
5	Espanyol	30	15	9	6	62	26	+36	54	
6	El Olivar	30	13	11	6	32	32	0	50	
7	Cornellà	30	13	7	10	34	27	+7	46	
8	San Francisco	30	10	11	9	34	33	+1	41	
9	Manacor	30	11	7	12	35	35	0	40	
10	Gimnàstic Manresa	30	10	5	15	25	38	−13	35	
11	Gimnàstic Tarragona	30	9	7	14	29	42	−13	34	
12	Lleida Esportiu	30	8	6	16	31	59	−28	30	
13	Sant Andreu	30	7	6	17	31	55	−24	27	Relegation to Liga Nacional
14	Damm	30	6	4	20	36	60	−24	22	Relegation to Liga Nacional
15	Bellvitge	30	3	9	18	24	50	−26	18	Relegation to Liga Nacional
16	Peña Deportiva	30	4	2	24	17	81	−64	14	Relegation to Liga Nacional

Updated to match(es) played on 14 April 2018. Source:
Rules for classification: 1) Points; 2) Goal difference; 3) Number of goals scored

=== Group IV ===
Pos	Team	Pld	W	D	L	GF	GA	GD	Pts	Qualification or relegation
1	Málaga	30	23	3	4	86	27	+59	72	Qualification to Copa de Campeones
2	Betis	30	23	1	6	61	27	+34	70	Qualification to Copa del Rey
3	San Félix	30	20	9	1	65	19	+46	69	Qualification to Copa del Rey
4	Sevilla	30	21	5	4	59	21	+38	68	
5	Granada	30	18	5	7	71	31	+40	59	
6	Almería	30	14	6	10	50	38	+12	48	
7	Córdoba	30	14	5	11	44	35	+9	47	
8	Tomares	30	10	6	14	40	47	−7	36	
9	Cádiz	30	9	6	15	35	44	−9	33	
10	La Cañada Atlético	30	8	7	15	30	49	−19	31	
11	26 de Febrero	30	8	6	16	42	75	−33	30	
12	Recreativo	30	6	9	15	25	41	−16	27	
13	Nervión	30	8	3	19	30	71	−41	27	Relegation to Liga Nacional
14	Sevilla Este	30	7	3	20	30	67	−37	24	Relegation to Liga Nacional
15	Atlético Sanluqueño	30	6	4	20	25	66	−41	22	Relegation to Liga Nacional
16	Antequera	30	3	6	21	28	63	−35	15	Relegation to Liga Nacional

Updated to match(es) played on 8 April 2018. Source:
Rules for classification: 1) Points; 2) Goal difference; 3) Number of goals scored

=== Group V ===
Pos	Team	Pld	W	D	L	GF	GA	GD	Pts	Qualification or relegation
1	Atlético Madrid	30	25	3	2	106	22	+84	78	Qualification to Copa de Campeones
2	Rayo Vallecano	30	24	4	2	72	23	+49	76	Qualification to Copa del Rey
3	Real Madrid	30	23	5	2	86	20	+66	74	Qualification to Copa del Rey
4	Valladolid	30	15	5	10	76	34	+42	50	
5	Getafe	30	14	6	10	53	38	+15	48	
6	Rayo Majadahonda	30	15	3	12	50	53	−3	48	
7	Aravaca	30	12	6	12	47	49	−2	42	
8	Diocesano	30	11	5	14	51	51	0	38	
9	Leganés	30	11	5	14	47	56	−9	38	
10	Santa Marta de Tormes	30	8	12	10	31	38	−7	36	
11	Unión Adarve	30	8	8	14	29	50	−21	32	
12	Almendralejo	30	8	6	16	31	73	−42	30	
13	Alcobendas	30	7	7	16	29	60	−31	28	Relegation to Liga Nacional
14	Colegios Diocesanos	30	7	6	17	28	57	−29	27	Relegation to Liga Nacional
15	Atlético Casarrubuelos	30	4	6	20	22	66	−44	18	Relegation to Liga Nacional
16	Fútbol Peña	30	3	3	24	21	89	−68	12	Relegation to Liga Nacional

Updated to match(es) played on 8 April 2018. Source:
Rules for classification: 1) Points; 2) Goal difference; 3) Number of goals scored

=== Group VI ===
Pos	Team	Pld	W	D	L	GF	GA	GD	Pts	Qualification or relegation
1	Las Palmas	30	28	1	1	89	13	+76	85	Qualification to Copa de Campeones
2	Tenerife	30	27	2	1	93	16	+77	83	Qualification to Copa de Campeones
3	San José	30	14	5	11	52	39	+13	47	
4	Estrella	30	13	7	10	50	45	+5	46	
5	Laguna	30	11	10	9	54	47	+7	43	
6	Sobradillo	30	11	10	9	40	35	+5	43	
7	Orientación Marítima	30	9	13	8	39	31	+8	40	
8	Acodetti	30	9	11	10	41	47	−6	38	
9	Arucas	30	11	5	14	41	53	−12	38	
10	Guía	30	10	6	14	41	43	−2	36	
11	Victoria	30	9	8	13	40	65	−25	35	
12	Longuera-Toscal	30	9	6	15	45	64	−19	33	
13	Huracán	30	6	12	12	40	53	−13	30	Relegation to Liga Nacional
14	Juventud Laguna	30	7	5	18	31	50	−19	26	Relegation to Liga Nacional
15	Tenisca	30	5	8	17	28	68	−40	23	Relegation to Liga Nacional
16	Playas de Sotavento	30	4	5	21	27	82	−55	17	Relegation to Liga Nacional

Updated to match(es) played on 7 April 2018. Source:
Rules for classification: 1) Points; 2) Goal difference; 3) Number of goals scored

=== Group VII ===
Pos	Team	Pld	W	D	L	GF	GA	GD	Pts	Qualification or relegation
1	Atlético Madrileño	30	18	7	5	57	27	+30	61	Qualification to Copa de Campeones
2	Valencia	30	18	4	8	56	34	+22	58	Qualification to Copa del Rey
3	Villarreal	30	16	8	6	70	36	+34	56	
4	Roda	30	17	5	8	64	40	+24	56	
5	Murcia	30	12	9	9	51	42	+9	45	
6	Albacete	30	11	11	8	36	26	+10	44	
7	Torre Levante	30	11	10	9	37	38	−1	43	
8	Levante	30	7	15	8	36	30	+6	36	
9	Ranero	30	9	9	12	25	37	−12	36	
10	Elche	30	8	11	11	32	37	−5	35	
11	Alboraya	30	8	9	13	29	45	−16	33	
12	Kelme	30	7	11	12	23	30	−7	32	
13	Hércules	30	7	11	12	30	43	−13	32	Relegation to Liga Nacional
14	Toledo	30	8	6	16	27	55	−28	30	Relegation to Liga Nacional
15	Torre Pacheco	30	6	8	16	31	60	−29	26	Relegation to Liga Nacional
16	UCAM Murcia	30	4	12	14	24	48	−24	24	Relegation to Liga Nacional

Updated to match(es) played on 8 April 2018. Source:
Rules for classification: 1) Points; 2) Goal difference; 3) Number of goals scored

=== Ranking of second-placed teams ===
The best runner-up will qualify for the Copa de Campeones.

The seven best runners-up are determined by the following parameters, in this order:

1. Highest number of points
2. Goal difference
3. Highest number of goals scored

Pos	Grp	Team	Pld	W	D	L	PF	PA	PD	Pts	Qualification
1	VI	Tenerife	30	27	2	1	93	16	+77	83	Qualification to Copa de Campeones
2	V	Rayo Vallecano	30	24	4	2	72	23	+49	76	
3	IV	Betis	30	23	1	6	61	27	+34	70	
4	I	Deportivo La Coruña	30	21	5	4	83	22	+61	68	
5	II	Real Sociedad	30	21	4	5	79	37	+42	67	
6	III	Zaragoza	30	21	3	6	66	28	+38	66	
7	VII	Valencia	30	18	4	8	56	34	+22	58	

=== Ranking of third-placed teams ===
The two best third-placed will qualify for the Copa del Rey.

The seven best third-placed are determined by the following parameters, in this order:

1. Highest number of points
2. Goal difference
3. Highest number of goals scored

Pos	Grp	Team	Pld	W	D	L	PF	PA	PD	Pts	Qualification
1	V	Real Madrid	30	23	5	2	86	20	+66	74	Qualification to Copa del Rey
2	IV	San Félix	30	20	9	1	65	19	+46	69	Qualification to Copa del Rey
3	I	Celta Vigo	30	19	8	3	70	33	+37	65	
4	III	Mallorca	30	20	3	7	59	29	+30	63	
5	II	Alavés	30	17	7	6	79	38	+41	58	
6	VII	Villarreal	30	16	8	6	70	36	+34	56	
7	VI	San José	30	14	5	11	52	39	+13	47	

== Copa de Campeones ==
The seven group champions and the best runner-up were qualified to this competition whose winner will play the 2018–19 UEFA Youth League. The draw was held in Ciudad Real on 10 April 2018.

The quarterfinals and semifinals will be played in Ciudad Real and Puertollano, while the final at Estadio Rey Juan Carlos I, in Ciudad Real.

Quarterfinals
30 April – Ciudad Real
Sporting Gijón	3
Las Palmas	0
30 April – Ciudad Real
Málaga	0
Barcelona	4
30 April – Puertollano
Tenerife	1
Athletic Bilbao	0
30 April – Puertollano
Atlético Madrid	4
Atlético Madrileño	0

Semifinals
2 May – Ciudad Real
Sporting Gijón	2
Barcelona	1
2 May – Puertollano
Tenerife	0
Atlético Madrid	1

Final
5 May – Ciudad Real
Sporting Gijón	1
Atlético Madrid	3

=== Quarter-finals ===
30 April 2018	Sporting Gijón	3–0	Las Palmas	Ciudad Real
16:00	Sandoval 33'; Morilla 47'; Juanma 59'	Quarterfinal		Stadium: Ciudad Deportiva Sur; Referee: Montero de Lerma

30 April 2018	Tenerife	1–0	Athletic Bilbao	Puertollano
18:00	Borja 89'	Quarterfinal		Stadium: Ciudad de Puertollano; Referee: Collado López

30 April 2018	Málaga	0–4	Barcelona	Ciudad Real
19:00		Quarterfinal	Collado 48'; Puig 52'; Jaime 65'; Marqués 75'	Stadium: Ciudad Deportiva Sur; Referee: Alberola Rojas

30 April 2018	Atlético Madrid	4–0	Atlético Madrileño	Puertollano
21:00	Montero 15'; Garcés 23'; Escudero 56'; Salido 90'	Quarterfinal		Stadium: Ciudad de Puertollano; Referee: Cambronero González

=== Semifinals ===
2 May 2018	Sporting Gijón	2–1	Barcelona	Ciudad Real
17:00	Sandoval 9'; Ferreiro 81'	Semifinal	Marqués 64'	Stadium: Rey Juan Carlos I Referee: Ruipérez Marín

2 May 2018	Tenerife	0–1	Atlético Madrid	Puertollano
20:00		Semifinal	Navarro 48' (pen.)	Stadium: Ciudad de Puertollano; Referee: Escudero Marín

=== Final ===
5 May 2018
12:00

Sporting Gijón	1–3	Atlético Madrid
Sandoval 62'	Final	Garcés 33'; Escudero 52'; Óscar 72'

Rey Juan Carlos I, Ciudad Real
Referee: Arcediano Monescillo

SPORTING GIJÓN:
GK	(Cuba) Christian Joel
DF	(Spain) Guille Rosas		(substituted off) 76'
DF	(Spain) Miguel Prado	Booked
DF	(Spain) Juanma		(substituted off) 76'
DF	(Spain) Pablo García	Booked
MF	(Spain) Abraham Ferreres		(substituted off) 79'
MF	(Spain) José Gragera	Booked
MF	(Spain) Daniel Sandoval
MF	(Spain) Javier Mecerreyes
MF	(Spain) Pelayo Morilla
FW	(Spain) César García		(substituted off) 52'
Substitutes:
DF	(Spain) Yoel Palacio		(substituted in) 76'
DF	(Spain) Jordi Pola		(substituted in) 79'
MF	(Spain) Gaspar		(substituted in) 52'
FW	(Spain) Álex Toquero		(substituted in) 76'
Manager:
(Spain) Isma Piñera

ATLÉTICO MADRID:
GK	(Spain) Álex Herrero
DF	(Spain) Ricard
DF	(Spain) Aitor Puñal
DF	(Spain) Javi Montero	Booked
DF	(Spain) Fernando Medrano
MF	(Spain) Mikel Carro
MF	(Spain) Juan Agüero		(substituted off) 86'
MF	(Spain) Andy Escudero		(substituted off) 73'
MF	(Spain) Óscar Clemente		(substituted off) 77'
FW	(Spain) Borja Garcés		(substituted off) 69'
FW	(Spain) Joaquín		(substituted off) 63'
Substitutes:
DF	(Spain) Aliaga		(substituted in) 86'
DF	(Spain) Roro		(substituted in) 73'
MF	(Spain) Adrián Ferreras		(substituted in) 63'
FW	(Spain) Giovanni Navarro		(substituted in) 69'
FW	(Spain) Alberto Salido		(substituted in) 77'
Manager:
(Spain) Manuel Cano

Copa de Campeones
winners
Atlético Madrid
2nd title

== See also ==
- 2018 Copa del Rey Juvenil
