= 2012 Copa del Rey Juvenil =

Tournament details
- Country: Spain
- Teams: 16

Final positions
- Champions: Espanyol
- Runners-up: Málaga

Tournament statistics
- Matches played: 29

The 2012 Copa del Rey Juvenil was the 62nd staging of the tournament. The competition began on 13 May and ended on 23 June with the final.

== First round ==
| Team 1 | Agg. | Team 2 | 1st leg | 2nd leg |
|---|---|---|---|---|
| Real Madrid | 1–5 | Tenerife | 0–3 | 1-2 |
| Real Sociedad | 8–7 | Sporting Gijón | 4–4 | 4–3 |
| Racing Santander | 4–3 | Danok Bat | 3–2 | 1–1 |
| Rayo Vallecano | 2–5 | Espanyol | 2–1 | 0–4 |
| Athletic Bilbao | 3–5 | Barcelona | 3–3 | 0–2 |
| Valencia | (a) 1–1 | Sevilla | 0–0 | 1–1 |
| CD Roda (Castellón) | 0–7 | Málaga | 0–4 | 0–3 |
| Atlético Madrid | 8–6 | Las Palmas | 5–2 | 3–4 |

== Quarterfinals ==
| Team 1 | Agg. | Team 2 | 1st leg | 2nd leg |
|---|---|---|---|---|
| Valencia | 1–3 | Málaga | 1–0 | 0–3 |
| Real Sociedad | 3–4 | Barcelona | 0–2 | 3–2 |
| Atlético Madrid | 4–3 | Tenerife | 2–2 | 2–1 |
| Espanyol | 1–0 | Racing Santander | 0–0 | 1–0 |

== Semifinals ==
| Team 1 | Agg. | Team 2 | 1st leg | 2nd leg |
|---|---|---|---|---|
| Atlético Madrid | 3–3 (a) | Espanyol | 2–2 | 1–1 |
| Málaga | 5–2 | Barcelona | 3–0 | 2–2 |

== Final ==
23 June 2012

| Málaga | 0–1 | Espanyol |
|---|---|---|
| | Report | Héctor 47'; Canadell (penalty missed) |

Estadio Municipal San Fernando Burriana
Attendance: 1,500
Referee: Ayza Gámez

Málaga:
| GK | (Spain) Toni Casamayor |
| DF | (Spain) Iván Márquez (substituted off) |
| DF | (Spain) Iván (substituted off) |
| DF | (Spain) Gonzalo (yellow card) |
| DF | (Spain) Álvaro |
| MF | (Spain) Jandro (substituted off) |
| MF | (Spain) Carlos |
| MF | (Spain) Rafael (substituted off) |
| MF | (Spain) Mauri |
| MF | (Spain) Samu Castillejo |
| FW | (Spain) Pedro |
Substitutes:
| | (Spain) Víctor Ruiz (substituted on) |
| MF | (Venezuela) Juanpi (substituted on) |
| | (Spain) Víctor Rueda (substituted on) |
| | (Spain) Peque (substituted on) |
Manager:
(Spain) Alberto González

Espanyol:
| GK | (Spain) Germán Parreño (yellow card) |
| DF | (Spain) Arroyo |
| DF | (Spain) Bonilla |
| DF | (Spain) Héctor |
| DF | (Spain) Aitor (substituted off) |
| MF | (Spain) Albert Miravent (substituted off) |
| MF | (Mexico) Pedro (substituted off) |
| MF | (Spain) Canadell |
| MF | (Ghana) Jafar |
| FW | (Spain) Rufo (substituted off) |
| FW | (Spain) Gil |
Substitutes:
| DF | (Spain) Rubén Duarte (substituted on) |
| MF | (Spain) Joan Jordán (substituted on) |
| FW | (Mali) Isma (substituted on) |
| FW | (Spain) Kilian Grant (substituted on) |
Manager:
(Spain) Dani Poyatos

Copa del Rey Juvenil
Winners
Espanyol

== See also ==
- 2011–12 División de Honor Juvenil de Fútbol
