= 2011 Copa del Rey Juvenil =

Tournament details
- Country: Spain

Final positions
- Champions: Barcelona
- Runners-up: Espanyol

The 2011 Copa del Rey Juvenil is the 61st staging of the Copa del Rey Juvenil de Fútbol. The competition began on 14 May 2011 and will end on 26 June 2011 with the final.

== Calendar ==
Round	Date	Clubs
Round of 16	14/15 May 2011	16 → 8
Round of 16	21/22 May 2011	16 → 8
Quarterfinals	28/29 May 2011	8 → 4
Quarterfinals	4/5 June 2011	8 → 4
Semifinals	11/12 June 2011	4 → 2
Semifinals	18/19 June 2011	4 → 2
Final	26 June 2011	2 → 1

== Round of 16 ==
Team 1	Agg.	Team 2	1st leg	2nd leg
Real Sociedad	2 – 6	Deportivo La Coruña	1–2	1–4
Celta Vigo	1 – 1	Athletic Bilbao	1–1	0–0
Real Madrid	5 – 3	Osasuna	1–2	4–1
Racing Santander	2 – 6	Rayo Vallecano	0–2	2–4
Tenerife	1 – 5	Espanyol	0–1	1–4
Barcelona	9 – 4	Las Palmas	6–2	3–2
Valencia	2 – 2	Córdoba	2–2	0–0
Sevilla	4 – 5	Villarreal	2–2	2–3

== Quarterfinals ==
Team 1	Agg.	Team 2	1st leg	2nd leg
Deportivo La Coruña	3 – 3	Real Madrid	2–0	1–3
Villarreal	3 – 4	Rayo Vallecano	1–3	2–1
Barcelona	5 – 5	Athletic Bilbao	3–2	2–3 (4-3 p)
Espanyol	4 – 3	Córdoba	3–1	1–2

== Semifinals ==
Team 1	Agg.	Team 2	1st leg	2nd leg
Rayo Vallecano	1 – 4	Espanyol	0–3	1–1
Deportivo La Coruña	4 – 7	Barcelona	1–4	3–3

== Final ==
=== Details ===
26 June 2011

Barcelona	2 – 0	Espanyol
Deulofeu 11'; Luís Gustavo 32'	Report

Alfonso Murube, Ceuta
Attendance: 2,500
Referee: Ramón Arias Madrid

Barcelona	Espanyol

BARCELONA:
GK	(Spain) Jesús Unzué
DF	(Spain) Eduard Campabadal	(substituted off) 80'
DF	(Spain) Sergi Gómez
DF	(Spain) Oriol Rosell
DF	(Spain) Iván Balliu
MF	(Portugal) Luís Gustavo
MF	(Spain) Jordi Masó
MF	(Spain) Javier Espinosa	(substituted off) 73'
FW	(Spain) Gerard Deulofeu	(substituted off) 85'
FW	(Spain) Rafinha
FW	(Spain) Ernesto Cornejo	(substituted off) 88'
Substitutes:
DF	(Spain) Sergio Ayala	(substituted on) 80'
MF	(Spain) Pepe Palau	(substituted on) 73'
MF	(Spain) Cristian Herrera	(substituted on) 88'
FW	(Cameroon) Jean Marie Dongou	(substituted on) 85'
Manager:
(Spain) Óscar García

ESPANYOL:
GK	(Spain) Édgar Badía
DF	(Spain) Héctor Rodríguez	(substituted off) 66'
DF	(Spain) Adrià Blanchart
DF	(Spain) Rubén Duarte	(substituted off) 46'
DF	(Spain) Carlos Clerc	(substituted off) 82'
MF	(Spain) Pau Senent
MF	(Spain) Albert Blázquez
MF	(Ghana) Paul Quaye	(substituted off) 62'
MF	(Spain) Pirulo
MF	(Spain) Gabi López
FW	(France) Thievy Bifouma
Substitutes:
DF	(Spain) Alejandro Bonilla	(substituted on) 66'
MF	(Spain) Eric López	(substituted on) 46'
MF	(Spain) Albert Miravent	(substituted on) 62'
MF	(Spain) Gil Muntadas	(substituted on) 82'
Manager:
(Argentina) Martín Posse

Copa del Rey
Winners
Barcelona

== See also ==
- 2010–11 División de Honor Juvenil de Fútbol
