= 1957 Copa del Generalísimo Juvenil =

Tournament details
- Country: Spain
- Teams: 60

Final positions
- Champions: Murcia
- Runners-up: Txorierri

Tournament statistics
- Matches played: 67
- Goals scored: 263 (3.93 per match)

The 1957 Copa del Generalísimo Juvenil was the seventh staging of the tournament. The competition began on May 5, 1957, and ended on June 16, 1957, with the final.

== First round ==
Team 1	Score	Team 2
Europa	1–5	FC Barcelona
Hércules L'Hospitalet	1–2	Hispania
Lleida	4–3	Zaragoza
Sallent	2–1	Terrassa
Columbo	2–1	Granollers
Valencia	1–0	Gimnàstic de Tarragona
Rapitenca	1–0	Villarreal
Espanyol	5–0	Ciutadella
Sevilla	8–0	Atlético Ceuta
Oviedo	4–1	Choco
Arnao	2–1	Alcázar
Osasuna	2–0	Txistu
Arenas de Zaragoza	0–8	Plus Ultra
Imperio de Mérida	0–8	Real Madrid
Vic	1–1	Girona
Igualada	1–1	Júpiter
Girod	1–1	Extremadura
Acero	6–0	Alcásser
Olímpic de Xàtiva	1–1	Algemesí
Astillero	1–1	Cimadevilla
Nueva Montaña	1–1	Rayo Reinosa
Arces	2–1	Ruklor
Poblense	1–0	San Javier
Indautxu	0–0	Txorierri
Bedaia Jubalde	2–3	Firestone
Peña Balsamaiso	5–1	Barakaldo
Real Unión	3–1	Erriberri
Atlético Madrid	9–1	Javieres

=== Replay Games ===
Team 1	Score	Team 2
Vic	0–1	Girona
Igualada	0–4	Júpiter
Girod	1–3	Extremadura
Olímpic de Xàtiva	–	Algemesí
Astillero	–	Cimadevilla
Nueva Montaña	–	Rayo Reinosa
Indautxu	–	Txorierri

== Second round ==
Team 1	Score	Team 2
Espanyol	8–1	Lleida
FC Barcelona	8–1	Sallent
Girona	0–1	Columbo
Hispania	0–1	Júpiter
Valencia	9–0	Rapitenca
Constància	3–0	Poblense
Rayo Reinosa	0–0	Arnao
Txorierri	5–2	Astillero
Firestone	5–2	Real Unión
Peña Balsamaiso	6–1	Osasuna
Murcia	2–1	Alicante
Oza Juvenil	2–0	Oviedo
Olímpic de Xàtiva	2–1	Real Madrid
Arces	3–1	Atlético Madrid
Plus Ultra	3–2	Acero
Extremadura	1–1	Sevilla

=== Replay Game ===
Team 1	Score	Team 2
Extremadura	2–2	Sevilla

== Third round ==
Team 1	Score	Team 2
Columbo	1–2	Espanyol
Júpiter	3–1	Valencia
Firestone	6–1	Peña Balsamaiso
Oza Juvenil	1–2	Arces
Olímpic de Xàtiva	0–2	Murcia
FC Barcelona	8–1	Constància
Txorierri	3–0	Rayo Reinosa
Plus Ultra	5–3	Extremadura

== Quarterfinals ==
Team 1	Score	Team 2
Espanyol	2–3	Murcia
Firestone	0–2	Txorierri
Arces	0–0	Plus Ultra
Júpiter	1–1	FC Barcelona

=== Replay Games ===
Team 1	Score	Team 2
Arces	1–2	Plus Ultra
Júpiter	1–1	FC Barcelona

== Semifinals ==
Team 1	Agg.	Team 2	1st leg	2nd leg
Murcia	3–1	Júpiter	2–0	1–1
Txorierri	2–2	Plus Ultra	2–0	0–2

== Final ==
Team 1	Score	Team 2
Murcia	6–1	Txorierri

Copa del Generalísimo
Winners
Murcia
