= 2016 Copa del Rey Juvenil =

Tournament details
- Country: Spain
- Teams: 16

Final positions
- Champions: Atlético Madrid
- Runners-up: Real Madrid

Tournament statistics
- Matches played: 29
- Goals scored: 94 (3.24 per match)

The 2016 Copa del Rey Juvenil was the 66th staging of the Copa del Rey Juvenil de Fútbol. The competition started on May 15, 2016 and finished on June 26, 2016.

== First round ==
The top two teams from each group of the 2015–16 División de Honor Juvenil de Fútbol and the two best third-placed teams were drawn into a two-game best aggregate score series. The first leg will be played on May 15 and the return leg on May 22.

Team 1	Agg.	Team 2	1st leg	2nd leg
Las Palmas	1–3	Atlético Madrid	1–1	0–2
Rayo Vallecano	3–2	Tenerife	3–0	0–2
Sevilla	2–3	Levante	2–1	0–2
Villarreal	5–1	Málaga	2–0	3–1
Athletic Bilbao	9–6	Oviedo	5–3	4–3
Sporting de Gijón	4–1	Antiguoko	1–0	3–1
Mallorca	2–8	Real Madrid	2–1	0–7
Racing de Santander	0–4	Espanyol	0–1	0–3

== Quarterfinals ==
The eight winners from the first round advance to quarterfinals, that are played in a two-game series. The first leg will be played on May 28 and 29 and the second leg on June 4 and 5.

Team 1	Agg.	Team 2	1st leg	2nd leg
Rayo Vallecano	1–4	Levante	0–1	1–3
Sporting de Gijón	1–5	Villarreal	0–1	1–4
Atlético Madrid	3–1	Athletic Bilbao	1–0	2–1
Real Madrid	4–2	Espanyol	3–1	1–1

== Semifinals ==
The four winners from the quarterfinals advance to semifinals, that are played in a two-game series. The first leg will be played on June 11 and 12 and the second leg on June 18 and 19.

Team 1	Agg.	Team 2	1st leg	2nd leg
Levante	2–4	Atlético Madrid	1–1	1–3
Real Madrid	3–3 (a)	Villarreal	1–1	2–2

== Final ==
The semifinal winners play a one-game final at the Estadio Son Bibiloni in Palma, Mallorca, Balearic Islands June 26.

=== Details ===
26 June 2016
11:00 CEST (UTC+02:00)

Real Madrid	3 – 4 (a.e.t.)	Atlético Madrid
Garci 18'; Mario 20', 26' (pen.)	report	Zakaria 15'; Toni Moya 48', 80'; Solano 96'

Estadio Son Bibiloni, Palma
Attendance: 400
Referee: Guillermo Cuadra Fernández

Real Madrid	Atlético Madrid

REAL MADRID:
GK	1	(France) Luca Zidane
DF	2	(Morocco) Achraf
DF	4	(Spain) Manu Hernando
DF	5	(Spain) Álex Martín		(substituted off) 105'
DF	3	(Spain) Dani
MF	6	(Spain) Jaume
MF	7	(Spain) Garci
MF	8	(Spain) Jaime Seoane (c)	(substituted off) 76'
MF	10	(Spain) Óscar		(substituted off) 89'
MF	11	(Spain) Álvaro Fidalgo		(substituted off) 56'
FW	9	(Spain) Mario
Substitutes:
GK	13	(Spain) Javi Belman
DF	12	(Spain) Gorka Zabarte		(substituted on) 105'
MF	14	(Spain) Martín		(substituted on) 76'
DF	15	(Spain) Fran García		(substituted on) 89'
FW	16	(Spain) Dani Gómez		(substituted on) 56'
Manager: (Argentina) Santiago Solari

ATLÉTICO MADRID
GK	1	(Spain) Miguel San Román
DF	2	(Colombia) Andrés Solano
DF	4	(Spain) Antonio Montoro (c)
DF	5	(Spain) Alberto Rodríguez	(yellow card) 92'
DF	3	(France) Théo Hernandez
MF	6	(Brazil) Caio		(substituted off) 71'
MF	8	(Albania) Keidi Bare
MF	7	(Spain) Juan Moreno		(substituted off) 105'
MF	10	(Spain) Toni Moya		(substituted off) 82'
FW	11	(Algeria) Mohammed Zakaria	(yellow card) 61'	(substituted off) 82'
FW	9	(Equatorial Guinea) Salomón Obama
Substitutes:
GK	13	(Spain) Alejandro Santomé
MF	12	(Spain) Luís Perea		(substituted on) 105'
MF	14	(Spain) Alberto Rentero		(substituted on) 82'
FW	15	(Spain) Ferni		(substituted on) 71'
FW	16	(Spain) Nacho Heras	(yellow card) 90'	(substituted on) 82'
Manager: (Spain) Óscar Fernández

Copa del Rey Juvenil
Winners
Atlético Madrid

== See also ==
- 2017 Copa del Rey Juvenil (final played between same clubs)
- 2018 Copa del Rey Juvenil (final played between same clubs)
- 2015–16 División de Honor Juvenil de Fútbol
