= 1956 Copa del Generalísimo Juvenil =

Tournament details
- Country: Spain
- Teams: 54

Final positions
- Champions: Atlético Madrid
- Runners-up: Zaragoza

Tournament statistics
- Matches played: 62
- Goals scored: 219 (3.53 per match)

The 1956 Copa del Generalísimo Juvenil was the sixth staging of the tournament. The competition began on May 6, 1956, and ended on June 24, 1956, with the final.

== First round ==
Team 1	Score	Team 2
Castellón	3–0	Sueca
Plus Ultra	2–0	San Miguel Fesa
Carabanchel	2–1	Plata
Cullera	1–0	Acero
Oza	1–2	Sporting de Gijón
Somió	4–1	Oviedo
Astillero	3–1	Sniace
Erandio	2–0	Osasuna
Constància	2–1	Atlético Baleares
Badalona	6–1	Vilassar de Mar
Girona	7–0	Figueres
Horta	2–0	Sant Andreu
Ilerda	0–4	FC Barcelona
Zaragoza	7–0	Lleida
Real Sociedad	2–0	Juventus
Melilla	2–2	Pilar de Tetuán
Vic	2–2	Martinenc
Sant Joan Despí	2–2	Igualada
Oberena	2–2	Txistu
Marina Cambrils	0–0	Tortosa
Aurrerá Ondarroa	w/o	Touring
Huesca	w/o	Mequinenza

=== Replay Games ===
Team 1	Score	Team 2
Melilla	3–0	Pilar de Tetuán
Vic	0–2	Martinenc
Sant Joan Despí	2–0	Igualada
Oberena	2–0	Txistu
Marina Cambrils	1–1	Tortosa

== Second round ==
Team 1	Score	Team 2
Valencia	6–0	Marina Cambrils
Martinenc	3–2	Horta
Terrassa	4–1	Constància
Castellón	4–0	Plus Ultra
Betis	3–1	Melilla
Atlético Madrid	5–0	Carabanchel
Alicante	4–0	Cullera
Sporting de Gijón	5–0	Santa Marina
Somió	4–1	Astillero
Racing de Santander	2–0	Erandio
Indautxu	6–0	Aurrerá Ondarroa
Badalona	4–1	Girona
FC Barcelona	8–2	Sant Joan Despí
Huesca	2–3	Zaragoza
Real Sociedad	0–0	Oberena
Extremadura	w/o	San José

=== Replay Game ===
Team 1	Score	Team 2
Real Sociedad	2–0	Oberena

== Third round ==
Team 1	Score	Team 2
Sporting de Gijón	2–0	Somió
Extremadura	1–3	Betis
Terrassa	1–0	Badalona
Zaragoza	2–1	Real Sociedad
Atlético Madrid	3–0	Alicante
Martinenc	1–0	FC Barcelona
Valencia	3–0	Castellón
Racing de Santander	1–1	Indautxu

=== Replay Game ===
Team 1	Score	Team 2
Racing de Santander	2–2	Indautxu

== Quarterfinals ==
Team 1	Score	Team 2
Sporting de Gijón	2–2	Racing de Santander
Betis	0–0	Atlético Madrid
Terrassa	0–0	Martinenc
Zaragoza	3–2	Valencia

=== Replay Games ===
Team 1	Score	Team 2
Sporting de Gijón	5–0	Racing de Santander
Betis	2–5	Atlético Madrid
Terrassa	0–2	Martinenc

== Semifinals ==
Team 1	Agg.	Team 2	1st leg	2nd leg
Sporting de Gijón	2–10	Atlético Madrid	2–6	0–4
Martinenc	2–2	Zaragoza	1–2	1–0

== Final ==
Team 1	Score	Team 2
Atlético Madrid	4–0	Zaragoza

Copa del Generalísimo
Winners
Atlético Madrid
