= 1954 Copa del Generalísimo Juvenil =

Tournament details
- Country: Spain
- Teams: 67

Final positions
- Champions: Plus Ultra
- Runners-up: Espanyol

Tournament statistics
- Matches played: 62
- Goals scored: 212 (3.42 per match)

The 1954 Copa del Generalísimo Juvenil was the fourth staging of the tournament. The competition began on May 9, 1954, and ended on June 20, 1954, with the final.

== First round ==
Team 1	Score	Team 2
Espanyol	1–0	Atlético Baleares
Poble Sec	0–1	FC Barcelona
Universitario	4–1	Júnior
Badalona	3–1	Cros
Granollers	7–0	Caldes
Sabadell	1–0	Martinenc
La Fuliola	2–0	Puigvertenc
Mataró	1–4	Manresa
Ripoll	2–0	Olot
Palamós	2–0	Figueres
Girona	6–0	Sant Esteve d'en Bas
Terrassa	3–0	Columbo
Tarraco	2–1	Tortosa
Vendrell	1–2	Torredembarra
Vic	0–2	Sant Celoni
Igualada	0–1	Gavà
Berga	3–0	Monistrol
Mora d'Ebre	2–1	Gas
Zaragoza	4–1	España Industrial
Sevilla	3–0	Badajoz
Alicante	0–1	Sueca
Sestao	4–0	Santoña
Lleida	3–1	Tarraconense
Real Madrid	1–2	Plus Ultra
Valladolid	0–2	Atlético Madrid
Gijón	5–0	Alcázar de Sama
Nueva Montaña	0–4	Astillero
Deportivo	3–2	Imperial de Vigo
Real Sociedad	0–1	Racing de Santander
África Ceutí	2–1	Melilla
Oberena	2–3	Tudelano
Valencia	3–2	Castellón
Arenas de Getxo	2–0	Juventus

== Second round ==
Team 1	Score	Team 2
Badalona	1–2	Universitario
Granollers	1–0	Ripoll
Espanyol	8–1	Sant Celoni
Zaragoza	2–1	Sabadell
Girona	6–0	Palamós
Manresa	5–1	Berga
Mora d'Ebre	1–2	Terrassa
Tudelano	3–3	Arenas de Getxo
Plus Ultra	2–1	Atlético Madrid
Sueca	1–2	Valencia
Sporting de Gijón	6–0	Deportivo
Sevilla	7–0	África Ceutí
Lleida	–	La Fuliola
FC Barcelona	7–0	Gavà
Torredembarra	1–2	Tarraco

== Third round ==
Team 1	Score	Team 2
Valencia	5–0	Tarraco
Zaragoza	5–3	Arenas de Getxo
Lleida	1–1	FC Barcelona
Plus Ultra	1–0	Sevilla
Racing de Santander	2–0	Sporting de Gijón
Espanyol	1–1	Universitario
Girona	2–0	Granollers
Terrassa	–	Manresa

=== Replay Game ===
Team 1	Score	Team 2
Espanyol	1–0	Universitario

== Quarterfinals ==
Team 1	Score	Team 2
Valencia	0–3	Plus Ultra
Zaragoza	1–0	Racing de Santander
Manresa	0–1	Espanyol
FC Barcelona	2–1	Girona

== Semifinals ==
Team 1	Score	Team 2
Plus Ultra	5–0	Racing de Santander
Espanyol	3–1	FC Barcelona

== Final ==
Team 1	Score	Team 2
Plus Ultra	2–1	Espanyol

Copa del Generalísimo
Winners
Plus Ultra
