= 1951 Copa del Generalísimo Juvenil =

Tournament details
- Country: Spain
- Teams: 21

Final positions
- Champions: FC Barcelona
- Runner-up: Sueca

Tournament statistics
- Matches played: 21
- Goals scored: 72 (3.43 per match)

The 1951 Copa del Generalísimo Juvenil was the first staging of the tournament. The competition began on 29 April 1951, and ended on 27 May 1951, with the final.

== First round ==
Team 1	Score	Team 2
Juvenil de Santander	1–2	Indautxu
Lleida	1–2	Celta de Zaragoza
Sabadell	4–1	Gavà
Arenas de Zaragoza	5–0	Iruña
Segarra	0–2	Atlético de Madrid
Sueca	w/o	Villena

== Second round ==
Team 1	Score	Team 2
Celta de Zaragoza	1–0	Sabadell
Deportivo	3–3	Valladolid-Salvador
Atlético de Madrid B	2–0	Arenas de Zaragoza
FC Barcelona	3–2	Atlético Baleares
Astillero	0–3	Indautxu
Naval de Cartagena	1–2	Sueca
Sevilla	2–0	Almería

== Second round replay ==
Team 1	Score	Team 2
Deportivo	0–1	Valladolid-Salvador

== Quarterfinals ==
Team 1	Score	Team 2
Valladolid-Salvador	0–1	Indautxu
Atlético de Madrid	4–5	Atlético de Madrid B
Sueca	1–0	Sevilla
FC Barcelona	9–0	Celta de Zaragoza

== Semifinals ==
Team 1	Score	Team 2
FC Barcelona	3–0	Indautxu
Sueca	1–1	Atlético de Madrid B

== Semifinals replay ==
Team 1	Score	Team 2
Sueca	0–0	Atlético de Madrid B

Sueca qualified after drawing lot.

== Final ==
Team 1	Score	Team 2
FC Barcelona	5–1	Sueca

Copa del Generalísimo
Winners
FC Barcelona
