= 1961 Copa del Generalísimo Juvenil =

Tournament details
- Country: Spain
- Teams: 16

Final positions
- Champions: Valencia
- Runner-up: Elizondo

Tournament statistics
- Matches played: 29
- Goals scored: 122 (4.21 per match)

The 1961 Copa del Generalísimo Juvenil was the 11th staging of the tournament. The competition began on May 21, 1961, and ended on July 2, 1961, with the final.

== First round ==
Team 1	Agg.	Team 2	1st leg	2nd leg
Sevilla	10–2	Melilla	8–0	2–2
Plus Ultra	6–2	Plasencia	5–1	1–1
Ciutadella	3–5	Sants	2–0	1–5
Naval de Cartagena	1–6	Valencia	0–3	1–3
Elizondo	7–1	Valladolid	6–0	1–1
Pamplona	3–6	Zaragoza	3–3	0–3
Frimotor	3–4	Guarnizo	1–2	2–2
Celta de Vigo	2–9	Sporting de Gijón	1–2	1–7

== Quarterfinals ==
Team 1	Agg.	Team 2	1st leg	2nd leg
Sevilla	6–1	Plus Ultra	3–1	3–0
Sants	2–8	Valencia	1–2	1–6
Elizondo	4–2	Zaragoza	3–1	1–1
Guarnizo	2–8	Sporting de Gijón	2–0	0–8

== Semifinals ==
Team 1	Agg.	Team 2	1st leg	2nd leg
Elizondo	8–0	Sporting de Gijón	6–0	2–0
Sevilla	0–2	Valencia	0–0	0–2

== Final ==
Team 1	Score	Team 2
Elizondo	2–7	Valencia

Copa del Generalísimo
Winners
Valencia
