= 1962 Copa del Generalísimo Juvenil =

Tournament details
- Country: Spain
- Teams: 16

Final positions
- Champions: Sevilla
- Runners-up: Athletic Bilbao

Tournament statistics
- Matches played: 29
- Goals scored: 130 (4.48 per match)

The 1962 Copa del Generalísimo Juvenil was the 12th staging of the tournament. The competition began on May 13, 1962, and ended on June 24, 1962, with the final.

== First round ==
Team 1	Agg.	Team 2	1st leg	2nd leg
Imperio de Mérida	0–7	Valladolid	0–1	0–6
Laredo	5–8	Plus Ultra	4–1	1–7
Real Melilla	1–12	Sevilla	1–3	0–9
Osasuna	4–5	Stadium Casablanca	2–0	2–5
FC Barcelona	7–1	Juventud Sallista	4–0	3–1
Sporting de Gijón	12–0	Arsenal	6–0	6–0
Eibar	3–9	Athletic Bilbao	1–4	2–5
Albacete	3–2	Valencia	3–1	0–1

== Quarterfinals ==
Team 1	Agg.	Team 2	1st leg	2nd leg
Valladolid	3–5	Plus Ultra	2–1	2–4
Sevilla	9–3	Albacete	6–2	3–1
Stadium Casablanca	2–11	FC Barcelona	1–3	1–8
Sporting de Gijón	1–4	Athletic Bilbao	1–2	0–2

== Semifinals ==
Team 1	Agg.	Team 2	1st leg	2nd leg
FC Barcelona	1–2	Athletic Bilbao	1–0	0–2
Plus Ultra	0–8	Sevilla	0–3	0–5

== Final ==
Team 1	Score	Team 2
Athletic Bilbao	0–2	Sevilla

Copa del Generalísimo
Winners
Sevilla
