= 1959 Copa del Generalísimo Juvenil =

Tournament details
- Country: Spain
- Teams: 17

Final positions
- Champions: FC Barcelona
- Runner-up: Sevilla

Tournament statistics
- Matches played: 28
- Goals scored: 110 (3.93 per match)

The 1959 Copa del Generalísimo Juvenil was the ninth staging of the tournament. The competition began on March 1, 1959, and ended on June 29, 1959, with the final.

== First round ==
Team 1	Score	Team 2
Osasuna	3–0	Mirandés

== Second round ==
Team 1	Agg.	Team 2	1st leg	2nd leg
Sevilla	16–2	Imperio de Mérida	12–1	4–1
Poblense	3–5	Olímpic de Xàtiva	3–1	0–4
Sniace	0–13	Real Madrid	0–3	0–10
Salamanca	4–1	Arsenal	3–0	1–1
Galdakao	1–1	Osasuna	0–0	1–1
Real Sociedad	2–2	Oviedo	1–2	1–0
Murcia	4–4	Zaragoza	3–0	1–4
FC Barcelona	w/o	Real Melilla	–	–

== Quarterfinals ==
Team 1	Agg.	Team 2	1st leg	2nd leg
Galdakao	5–4	Oviedo	2–2	3–2
Zaragoza	2–9	FC Barcelona	1–2	2–7
Sevilla	4–1	Olímpic de Xàtiva	3–0	1–1
Real Madrid	6–1	Salamanca	5–1	1–0

== Semifinals ==
Team 1	Agg.	Team 2	1st leg	2nd leg
Galdakao	2–7	FC Barcelona	1–3	1–4
Sevilla	3–1	Real Madrid	3–0	0–1

== Final ==
Team 1	Score	Team 2
FC Barcelona	2–2	Sevilla

Copa del Generalísimo
Winners
FC Barcelona
