= 1964 Copa del Generalísimo Juvenil =

Tournament details
- Country: Spain
- Teams: 16

Final positions
- Champions: Athletic Bilbao
- Runners-up: Real Madrid

Tournament statistics
- Matches played: 30
- Goals scored: 123 (4.1 per match)

The 1964 Copa del Generalísimo Juvenil was the 14th staging of the youth football tournament. The competition began on May 24, 1964, and ended on July 7, 1964, with the final.

== First round ==
Team 1	Agg.	Team 2	1st leg	2nd leg
Cultural Leonesa	0–3	Deportivo	0–0	0–3
Oviedo	0–4	Athletic Bilbao	0–3	0–1
Toluca	1–2	Bergara	1–1	0–1
San Javier	1–8	FC Barcelona	0–0	1–8
Melilla	0–7	Betis	0–0	0–7
Valencia	2–4	Elche	2–1	0–3
Imperio de Mérida	0–16	Real Madrid	0–8	0–8
Zaragoza	4–5	Chantrea	2–3	2–2

== Quarterfinals ==
Team 1	Agg.	Team 2	1st leg	2nd leg
Deportivo	0–11	Athletic Bilbao	0–2	0–9
Bergara	4–8	FC Barcelona	2–1	2–7
Betis	8–2	Elche	4–1	4–1
Real Madrid	6–2	Chantrea	5–1	1–1

== Semifinals ==
Team 1	Agg.	Team 2	1st leg	2nd leg
Athletic Bilbao	7–1	FC Barcelona	4–0	3–1
Betis	4–6	Real Madrid	3–2	1–4

== Final ==
Team 1	Score	Team 2
Athletic Bilbao	2–2	Real Madrid

== Final Replay ==
7 July 1964

Athletic Bilbao	2–1	Real Madrid
Gurtubay 60'; Arieta 115'	Report	Aparicio 46'

Metropolitano, Madrid
Attendance: 15,000
Referee: Cerezuela Ruiz

Athletic Bilbao:
GK	(Spain) Deusto
DF	(Spain) Garay
DF	(Spain) Pachu
DF	(Spain) Castresana
MF	(Spain) Nando
MF	(Spain) Urra
FW	(Spain) Echevarria
FW	(Spain) Plaza
FW	(Spain) Arieta
FW	(Spain) Gurtubay
FW	(Spain) Ortiz
Manager:
(Spain) José Luis Garay

Real Madrid:
GK	(Spain) Iglesias
DF	(Spain) Arriola
DF	(Spain) Pulido
DF	(Spain) Guerra
MF	(Spain) Salagré
MF	(Spain) Segura
FW	(Spain) Asensi
FW	(Spain) José
FW	(Spain) Aparicio
FW	(Spain) Doménech
FW	(Spain) Javier

Copa del Generalísimo
Winners
Athletic Bilbao
