= 1952 Copa del Generalísimo Juvenil =

Tournament details
- Country: Spain
- Teams: 31

Final positions
- Champions: Atlético de Madrid
- Runners-up: Real Sociedad

Tournament statistics
- Matches played: 31
- Goals scored: 123 (3.97 per match)

The 1952 Copa del Generalísimo Juvenil was the second staging of the tournament. The competition began on April 28, 1952, and ended on May 25, 1952, with the final.

== First round ==
Team 1	Score	Team 2
FC Barcelona	2–0	Atlético Baleares
Vic	5–1	Martinenc
Sabadell	2–0	Gavà
Arenas de Zaragoza	0–4	Lleida
Buenavista	0–5	Deportivo
Indautxu	1–4	Astillero
Valladolid	1–4	Plus Ultra
Real Madrid	7–0	Arenas
Real Sociedad	4–1	Txistu
Anaitasuna	4–0	Hernán Cortés
Sevilla	4–1	Juvenil de Tetuán
Córdoba de Melilla	0–1	Almería
Imperial	0–2	Levante
Valencia	0–0	Naval de Cartagena
Atlético de Madrid	5–0	Pacense

Valencia qualified with more corners.

== Second round ==
Team 1	Score	Team 2
Levante	0–2	Atlético de Madrid
Almería	2–0	Sevilla
Vic	1–2	FC Barcelona
Valencia	2–3	Sabadell
Lleida	1–1	Anaitasuna
Real Sociedad	4–0	Real Madrid
Plus Ultra	5–2	Astillero
Deportivo	3–0	Celta

Lleida qualified with more corners.

== Quarterfinals ==
Team 1	Score	Team 2
FC Barcelona	2–1	Sabadell
Lleida	0–3	Real Sociedad
Plus Ultra	4–2	Deportivo
Atlético de Madrid	5–1	Almería

== Semifinals ==
Team 1	Score	Team 2
Atlético de Madrid	1–1	FC Barcelona
Real Sociedad	6–2	Plus Ultra

== Semifinals Replay ==
Team 1	Score	Team 2
Atlético de Madrid	2–1	FC Barcelona

== Final ==
Team 1	Score	Team 2
Atlético de Madrid	4–2	Real Sociedad

Copa del Generalísimo
Winners
Atlético de Madrid
