= Paquito Escudero =

Spanish footballer (born 1966)

Paquito

Personal information
- Full name: Francisco Gabriel Escudero Martínez
- Date of birth: 24 March 1966 (age 60)
- Place of birth: Rafal, Spain
- Height: 1.75 m (5 ft 9 in)
- Position: Midfielder

Youth career
- 1974–1985: Betis Florida

Senior career*
Years	Team	Apps	(Gls)
1985–1988	Alicante		
1988–1990	Benidorm	36	(8)
1990–2001	Hércules	306	(24)
Total		342	(32)

Managerial career
- 2003–2007: Hércules (assistant)
- 2007: Hércules
- * Club domestic league appearances and goals

Francisco Gabriel Escudero Martínez (born 24 March 1966), commonly known as Paquito, is a Spanish retired football midfielder and manager.

The vast majority of his professional career was associated with Hércules, as he served the club as a player, coach and director of football.

== Playing career ==
Born in Rafal, Alicante, Valencian Community, Paquito started playing football in the neighborhood of La Florida. He made his senior debut with Alicante CF in Tercera División, going on to play two seasons with Benidorm CF and helping the team promote (also finishing the regular season as champions) to Segunda División B for the second time in their history.

In 1990, Paquito remained in his native region and signed with Hércules CF, helping to promote to Segunda División in his third year. In his 11-year spell he appeared in 342 official games, contributing with 34 matches (one goal) as the club returned to La Liga after a ten-year absence and being again an undisputed starter the following campaign, which ended in immediate relegation; his top-flight debut occurred on 1 September 1996, in a 2–1 home win against CF Extremadura.

== Coaching career ==
Paquito suffered a serious injury during 1999–00, with Hércules in the third division, officially retiring from football in May 2001 at age 35. He remained with the club working in directorial capacities and, in 2003, began working as an assistant coach, a position he held under managers José Carlos Granero, Juan Carlos Mandiá, José Bordalás and Josu Uribe.

On 15 May 2007, following Uribe's dismissal, Paquito was named head coach until the end of the second division season, eventually avoiding relegation with two wins, one draw and two losses in his five games in charge. He was named director of football in the following campaign, remaining in charge for several years.

== Personal life ==
Paquito's son Andy is also a footballer. A winger, he was an Atlético Madrid youth graduate.

== Honours ==
=== Player ===
Hércules

- Segunda División: 1995–96

Benidorm

- Tercera División: 1988–89
