= 1960 Copa del Generalísimo Juvenil =

Tournament details
- Country: Spain
- Teams: 16

Final positions
- Champions: Firestone
- Runner-up: Murcia

Tournament statistics
- Matches played: 28
- Goals scored: 111 (3.96 per match)

The 1960 Copa del Generalísimo Juvenil was the tenth staging of the tournament. The competition began on May 15, 1960, and ended on June 26, 1960, with the final.

== First round ==
Team 1	Agg.	Team 2	1st leg	2nd leg
Zaragoza	4–2	Atlético Madrid	3–0	1–2
Elizondo	8–0	Mirandés	3–0	5–0
Laredo	3–4	Firestone	3–0	0–4
Badajoz	3–4	Valladolid	2–3	1–1
Murcia	5–4	Valencia	5–2	0–2
Ciutadella	3–8	Badalona	1–3	2–5
Celta de Vigo	4–1	La Braña	2–0	2–1
Betis	w/o	Ceuta	3–1	–

== Quarterfinals ==
Team 1	Agg.	Team 2	1st leg	2nd leg
Zaragoza	4–6	Elizondo	3–3	1–3
Celta de Vigo	1–4	Firestone	1–1	0–3
Valladolid	5–2	Betis	2–2	3–0
Murcia	7–5	Badalona	5–2	2–3

== Semifinals ==
Team 1	Agg.	Team 2	1st leg	2nd leg
Elizondo	3–4	Firestone	1–2	2–2
Valladolid	2–4	Murcia	2–0	0–4

== Final ==
Team 1	Score	Team 2
Firestone	5–2	Murcia

Copa del Generalísimo
Winners
Firestone
