= 1958 Copa del Generalísimo Juvenil =

Tournament details
- Country: Spain
- Teams: 64

Final positions
- Champions: Atlético Madrid
- Runners-up: Alicante

Tournament statistics
- Matches played: 64
- Goals scored: 234 (3.66 per match)

The 1958 Copa del Generalísimo Juvenil was the eighth staging of the tournament. The competition began on May 18, 1958, and ended on June 29, 1958, with the final.

== First round ==
Team 1	Score	Team 2
Sevilla	5–1	Ceuta
Larrabide	2–6	Zaragoza
Gallur	–	Jaca
Tudelano	0–1	Osasuna
Peña Balsamaiso	6–0	Femsa
Real Sociedad	2–1	Getxo
Firestone	5–2	Ejea
Barakaldo	0–1	Indautxu
San Juan Costa	0–2	Sniace
Alcázar de Sama	0–0	Confecciones Haro
Peña Central	2–6	Mallorca
Maó	1–1	Mataró
Salesianos	4–1	Poblense
Arces	8–1	Cultural Leonesa
Universidad Laboral	0–3	Salamanca
Gandía	3–0	Murcia
Alicante	2–0	Olímpic de Xàtiva
Villarreal	2–1	Picassent
Pontevedra	6–1	Sporting de Coruña
FC Barcelona	7–0	Gimnàstic de Tarragona
Juventud de Mataró	1–4	Terrassa
Júpiter	4–2	Columbo
Rubí	1–2	Poble Sec
PB Villaverde	4–2	Artiguenc
Ilerda	4–0	Manresa
Plus Ultra	2–1	Plata
San Juan	0–3	Real Madrid
Hernán Cortés	0–4	Atlético Madrid
Victoria	1–0	Peñasco
Valencia	2–1	Rapitenca
Arnao	3–1	La Arena
Sant Celoni	2–2	Girona

== Second round ==
Team 1	Score	Team 2
FC Barcelona	6–0	Sant Celoni
Poble Sec	5–1	Maó
Terrassa	2–0	PB Villaverde
Mallorca	3–0	Júpiter
Zaragoza	4–0	Ilerda
Confecciones Haro	1–0	Pontevedra
Indautxu	1–0	Real Sociedad
Alicante	3–0	Gandía
Atlético Madrid	1–0	Sevilla
Valencia	3–2	Salesianos
Real Madrid	2–1	Arces
Osasuna	5–1	Peña Balsamaiso
Sniace	0–1	Firestone
Villarreal	5–0	Gallur
La Arena	3–1	Victoria
Salamanca	2–3	Plus Ultra

== Third round ==
Team 1	Score	Team 2
Firestone	3–0	Osasuna
La Arena	0–1	Confecciones Haro
Indautxu	0–1	Real Madrid
Plus Ultra	1–2	Alicante
Zaragoza	1–0	FC Barcelona
Atlético Madrid	3–0	Valencia
Terrassa	3–1	Villarreal
Poble Sec	4–0	Mallorca

== Quarterfinals ==
Team 1	Score	Team 2
Firestone	5–0	Zaragoza
Confecciones Haro	1–2	Atlético Madrid
Real Madrid	5–0	Terrassa
Alicante	3–1	Poble Sec

== Semifinals ==
Team 1	Agg.	Team 2	1st leg	2nd leg
Firestone	1–3	Atlético Madrid	1–1	0–2
Real Madrid	1–4	Alicante	1–2	0–2

== Final ==
Team 1	Score	Team 2
Atlético Madrid	2–1	Alicante

Copa del Generalísimo
Winners
Atlético Madrid
