= 1953 Copa del Generalísimo Juvenil =

Tournament details
- Country: Spain
- Teams: 34

Final positions
- Champions: Real Madrid
- Runners-up: FC Barcelona

Tournament statistics
- Matches played: 31
- Goals scored: 122 (3.94 per match)

The 1953 Copa del Generalísimo Juvenil was the third staging of the tournament. The competition began on May 17, 1953, and ended on June 30, 1953, with the final.

== Preliminary round ==
Team 1	Score	Team 2
Martinenc	1–5	Espanyol
Júnior	1–0	Poble Nou

== First round ==
Team 1	Score	Team 2
Batallador	2–2	Rápido Pereiró
Titánico	1–2	Astillero
Racing de Santander	5–0	Cimadevilla
Valladolid	4–1	Plus Ultra
Arenas de Zaragoza	2–3	Anaitasuna
Girona	4–1	Olot
Granollers	4–0	España Industrial
Manresa	2–0	Lleida
Real Madrid	4–2	Sueca
Badajoz	0–2	Sevilla
Espanyol	5–3	Júnior
Real Sociedad	3–1	Juventus
FC Barcelona	6–0	Atlético Baleares
Getxo	1–0	Eibar
España de Tánger	–	Marconi Melilla
Murcia	w/o	Alcoyano

== Second round ==
Team 1	Score	Team 2
Sevilla	5–0	España de Tánger
Espanyol	4–1	Manresa
Granollers	1–0	Girona
Valladolid	6–0	Real Sociedad
Alcoyano	2–3	Real Madrid
Astillero	2–0	Batallador
FC Barcelona	8–0	Anaitasuna
Getxo	–	Racing de Santander

== Quarterfinals ==
Team 1	Score	Team 2
Real Madrid	3–0	Sevilla
Granollers	1–3	Espanyol
FC Barcelona	5–1	Valladolid
Astillero	4–1	Racing de Santander

== Semifinals ==
Team 1	Score	Team 2
Real Madrid	2–0	Espanyol
FC Barcelona	2–1	Astillero

== Final ==
Team 1	Score	Team 2
Real Madrid	0–0	FC Barcelona

== Final Replay ==
Team 1	Score	Team 2
Real Madrid	0–0	FC Barcelona

Real Madrid won with more corners.

Copa del Generalísimo
Winners
Real Madrid
