= 1963 Copa del Generalísimo Juvenil =

Tournament details
- Country: Spain
- Teams: 16

Final positions
- Champions: Athletic Bilbao
- Runner-up: Real Madrid

Tournament statistics
- Matches played: 28
- Goals scored: 106 (3.79 per match)

The 1963 Copa del Generalísimo Juvenil was the 13th staging of the tournament. The competition began on May 12, 1963, and ended on June 23, 1963, with the final.

== First round ==
Team 1	Agg.	Team 2	1st leg	2nd leg
Racing de Santander	0–1	Athletic Bilbao	0–0	0–1
San Miguel	0–11	Añorga	0–2	0–9
Valencia	–	Zaragoza	–	1–2
Recreativo	7–1	Fundador de Ceuta	4–0	3–1
Granollers	7–4	Oberena	3–3	4–1
Juventud Sallista	6–3	Elche	3–3	3–0
Celta de Vigo	2–0	Cruz Blanca	2–0	0–0
Plasencia	5–14	Real Madrid	3–3	2–11

== Quarterfinals ==
Team 1	Agg.	Team 2	1st leg	2nd leg
Athletic Bilbao	3–2	Añorga	0–1	3–1
Valencia	2–6	Recreativo	1–3	1–3
Granollers	6–2	Juventud Sallista	4–1	2–1
Celta de Vigo	0–1	Real Madrid	0–0	0–1

== Semifinals ==
Team 1	Agg.	Team 2	1st leg	2nd leg
Athletic Bilbao	4–1	Recreativo	3–0	1–1
Granollers	5–8	Real Madrid	3–2	2–6

== Final ==
23 June 1963
17:15

Athletic Bilbao	2–0	Real Madrid
Uriarte 24'; Quintana 69'	Report

Camp Nou, Barcelona
Referee: Martín Álvarez

Athletic Bilbao:
GK	(Spain) Deusto
DF	(Spain) Basabe
DF	(Spain) Amorebieta
DF	(Spain) Castresana
MF	(Spain) Nando
MF	(Spain) Zugazaga
FW	(Spain) Echevarria
FW	(Spain) Zubiaga
FW	(Spain) Quintana
FW	(Spain) Uriarte
FW	(Spain) Simó
Manager:
(Spain) José Luis Garay

Real Madrid:
GK	(Spain) Delgado
DF	(Spain) Gallego
DF	(Spain) Camargo
DF	(Spain) Menéndez
MF	(Spain) Salagré
MF	(Spain) Roberto
FW	(Spain) Sorribas
FW	(Spain) José
FW	(Spain) Doménech
FW	(Spain) Lasheras
FW	(Spain) Encinas

Copa del Generalísimo
Winners
Athletic Bilbao
