= Copa del Rey Juvenil de Fútbol =

- Founded: 1951
- Region: Spain
- Teams: 32
- Current champions: Betis (5th title)
- Most championships: Barcelona (19 titles)
- Website: rfef.es
- 2026 Copa del Rey Juvenil

Copa del Rey Juvenil de Fútbol is an annual youth football tournament in Spain, which is contested by 32 teams from the División de Honor Juvenil. It is organised by the RFEF.

== History ==
The Copa del Rey Juvenil de Fútbol was founded in 1951 with the name of Copa del Generalísimo. Its name was changed in 1977 to Copa del Rey.

In the first two decades of the 21st century, qualification for the tournament was determined by the teams' finishing positions in the División de Honor Juvenil de Fútbol (a double-round robin league system), so was played at the end of the league season in May and June, with 16 participants (the two highest-placed across 6 groups (later re-organised into 7) and those 3rd-placed teams with the highest points. Following the two-year hiatus caused by the COVID-19 pandemic in Spain, the format was altered: the División de Honor would still form the basis for qualification, but now 32 teams would take part as determined by their results in the first half of the season, with the cup played during the second half. In the first two editions with this change, the opening round was limited to matches between teams from the same geographic group, but in 2024 this was changed to a seeded draw on a nationwide basis.

== Finals ==
Season	Location	Champion	Runner-up	Score
1951	Chamartín, Madrid	Barcelona	Sueca	5–1
1952	Chamartín, Madrid	Atlético Madrid	Real Sociedad	4–2
1953	Chamartín, Madrid	Real Madrid	Barcelona	0–0 (corners, 5–1)
1954	Chamartín, Madrid	Plus Ultra	Espanyol	2–1
1955	Santiago Bernabéu, Madrid	Real Sociedad	Sevilla	2–0
1956	Santiago Bernabéu, Madrid	Atlético Madrid	Zaragoza	4–0
1957	Sarrià, Barcelona	Murcia	Txorierri	6–1
1958	Santiago Bernabéu, Madrid	Atlético Madrid	Alicante	2–1
1959	Santiago Bernabéu, Madrid	Barcelona	Sevilla	2–2 ‡
1960	Santiago Bernabéu, Madrid	Firestone	Murcia	5–2
1961	Santiago Bernabéu, Madrid	Valencia	Elizondo	7–2
1962	Metropolitano, Madrid	Sevilla	Athletic Bilbao	2–0
1963	Camp Nou, Barcelona	Athletic Bilbao	Real Madrid	2–0
1964	Metropolitano, Madrid	Athletic Bilbao	Real Madrid	2–1 (aet)
1965	Santiago Bernabéu, Madrid	Athletic Bilbao	Celta	2–1
1966	La Viña, Alicante	Athletic Bilbao	Júpiter	5–0
1967	Santiago Bernabéu, Madrid	Athletic Bilbao	Damm	2–0
1968	Santiago Bernabéu, Madrid	Real Madrid	Real Sociedad	3–0
1969	Santiago Bernabéu, Madrid	Real Madrid	Triana	1–0
1970	Camp Nou, Barcelona	Athletic Bilbao	Las Palmas	3–2
1971	Santiago Bernabéu, Madrid	Real Madrid	Athletic Bilbao	2–1
1972	Santiago Bernabéu, Madrid	Las Palmas	Real Madrid	2–1
1973	Vicente Calderón, Madrid	Barcelona	Real Madrid	4–2
1974	Vicente Calderón, Madrid	Barcelona	Real Madrid	1–0
1975	Vicente Calderón, Madrid	Barcelona	Murcia	4–2
1976	Santiago Bernabéu, Madrid	Barcelona	Murcia	1–0
1977	Vicente Calderón, Madrid	Barcelona	Zaragoza	4–3
1978	La Romareda, Zaragoza	Real Madrid	Barcelona	1–0
1979	Vicente Calderón, Madrid	Sevilla Atlético	Athletic Bilbao	3–1
1980	Vicente Calderón, Madrid	Barcelona	Zaragoza	3–1
1981	Vicente Calderón, Madrid	Real Madrid	Athletic Bilbao	2–1
1982	Campo de la Federación, Albacete	Real Madrid	Murcia	2–0
1983	Príncipe Juan Carlos, Ciudad Real	Betis	Real Madrid	3–1
1984	La Romareda, Zaragoza	Athletic Bilbao	Real Madrid	2–1
1985	Santiago Bernabéu, Madrid	Real Madrid	Barcelona	2–1
1986	Las Gaunas, Logroño	Barcelona	Real Madrid	6–3
1987	Las Gaunas, Logroño	Barcelona	Athletic Bilbao	2–1
1988	La Pinilla, Teruel	Real Madrid	Barcelona	1–1 (penalties, 4–2)
1989	Las Gaunas, Logroño	Barcelona	Athletic Bilbao	3–2
1990	Carlos Belmonte, Albacete	Betis	Barcelona	4–2
1991	Castalia, Castellón de la Plana	Real Madrid	Barcelona	1–1 (penalties, 4–3)
1992	Los Pajaritos, Soria	Athletic Bilbao	Betis	1–1 (penalties, –)
1993	La Pinilla, Teruel	Real Madrid	Barcelona	2–1
1994	La Romareda, Zaragoza	Barcelona	Real Madrid	2–1
1995	Salto del Caballo, Toledo	Albacete	Sevilla	2–1
1996	La Romareda, Zaragoza	Barcelona	Real Madrid	4–2
1997	La Aldehuela, Fuenlabrada	Sevilla	Barcelona	2–1
1998	Salto del Caballo, Toledo	Betis	Alavés	0–0 (penalties, 4–3)
1999	Ciudad Deportiva, Olivenza	Betis	Real Madrid	2–1
2000	Municipal, Valdepeñas	Barcelona	Mallorca	2–1
2001	Nuevo Antonio Amilivia, León	Espanyol	Real Madrid	2–0
2002	La Fuensanta, Cuenca	Barcelona	Mallorca	2–1
2003	El Toralín, Ponferrada	Espanyol	Mallorca	3–1 (aet)
2004	Constantino Navarro, Baza	Espanyol	Osasuna	3–2
2005	Nou Sardenya, Barcelona	Barcelona	Sporting	2–0
2006	Los Pajaritos, Soria	Barcelona	Zaragoza	2–0
2007	Fernando Ruiz Hierro, Vélez-Málaga	Albacete	Valencia	2–1
2008	El Montecillo, Aranda de Duero	Sevilla	Barcelona	2–0
2009	Enrique López Cuenca, Nerja	Sevilla	Athletic Bilbao	3–2
2010	Francisco Bonet, Almuñécar	Athletic Bilbao	Real Madrid	2–0
2011	Alfonso Murube, Ceuta	Barcelona	Espanyol	2–0
2012	San Fernando, Burriana	Espanyol	Málaga	1–0
2013	Las Viñas, Vera	Real Madrid	Athletic Bilbao	4–0
2014*	Ciudad del Fútbol, Las Rozas	Sevilla	Real Madrid	1–1 (penalties, 4–2)
2015	Alfonso Murube, Ceuta	Rayo Vallecano	Real Madrid	2–1
2016	Son Bibiloni, Palma	Atlético Madrid	Real Madrid	4–3 (aet)
2017	La Planilla, Calahorra	Real Madrid	Atlético Madrid	4–1 (aet)
2018	La Fuensanta, Cuenca	Atlético Madrid	Real Madrid	3–1
2019	Antonio Peroles, Roquetas de Mar	Villarreal	Atlético Madrid	3–0
2020	Not Played (Note: On 6 May 2020, the Royal Spanish Football Federation announced the cancellation of the Copa del Rey Juvenil for the season due to the COVID-19 pandemic in Spain.)			
2021	Not Played			
2022	Anxo Carro, Lugo	Real Madrid	Espanyol	2–1 (aet)
2023	Reino de León, León	Real Madrid	Almería	2–1
2024	Carlos Tartiere, Oviedo	Mallorca	Espanyol	0–0 (penalties, 4–2)
2025	Municipal Villanovense, Villanueva de la Serena	Barcelona	Zaragoza	5–0
2026	Anxo Carro, Lugo	Betis	Barcelona	4–1

‡ The title decided by lower age of the players.
* Was scheduled to be played at the Estadio Cartagonova in Cartagena

== Champions ==
Team	Winners	Runners-up	Championship seasons
Barcelona	19	10	1951, 1959, 1973, 1974, 1975, 1976, 1977, 1980, 1986, 1987, 1989, 1994, 1996, 2000, 2002, 2005, 2006, 2011, 2025
Real Madrid	15	17	1953, 1968, 1969, 1971, 1978, 1981, 1982, 1985, 1988, 1991, 1993, 2013, 2017, 2022, 2023
Athletic Bilbao	9	8	1963, 1964, 1965, 1966, 1967, 1970, 1984, 1992, 2010
Sevilla	5	3	1962, 1997, 2008, 2009, 2014
Atlético Madrid	5	2	1952, 1956, 1958, 2016, 2018
Real Betis	5	1	1983, 1990, 1998, 1999, 2026
Espanyol	4	4	2001, 2003, 2004, 2012
Albacete	2	0	1995, 2007
Real Murcia	1	4	1957
Mallorca	1	3	2024
Real Sociedad	1	2	1955
Las Palmas	1	1	1972
Valencia	1	1	1961
Villarreal	1	0	2019
Rayo Vallecano	1	0	2015
Sevilla Atlético	1	0	1979
Firestone	1	0	1960
Plus Ultra	1	0	1954
Real Zaragoza	0	5	—
Almería	0	1	
Málaga	0	1	—
Sporting Gijón	0	1	—
Osasuna	0	1	—
Alavés	0	1	—
Triana Balompié	0	1	—
Damm	0	1	—
Júpiter	0	1	—
Celta Vigo	0	1	—
Elizondo	0	1	—
Alicante	0	1	—
Txorierri	0	1	—
Sueca	0	1	—

== See also ==
- RFEF
- Copa de Campeones Juvenil de Fútbol
- Copa del Rey
