= Mode (footballer) =

Spanish footballer

Personal information
- Full name: Modesto Acosta de la Rosa
- Date of birth: 14 June 1994 (age 32)
- Place of birth: Tomares, Spain
- Height: 1.70 m (5 ft 7 in)
- Position: Right-back

Team information
- Current team: Oduciarosal

Youth career
- Sevilla

Senior career*
Years	Team	Apps	(Gls)
2013–2015	Sevilla B	46	(0)
2014	Sevilla	1	(0)
2015–2016	Alcoyano	27	(0)
2016	Levante B	2	(0)
2017	Albacete	9	(0)
2018–2019	Mora	26	(0)
2019–2020	Torrijos	5	(0)
2020–2021	Villacañas	25	(0)
2021–2022	Tomares	12	(0)
2023–	Oduciarosal	22	(5)
- * Club domestic league appearances and goals as of 12:32, 29 October 2024 (UTC)

Modesto Acosta de la Rosa (born 14 June 1994), commonly known as Mode, is a Spanish footballer who plays as a right-back for CD Oduciarosal.

== Club career ==
Born in Tomares, Province of Seville, Andalusia, Mode finished his youth career at local Sevilla FC. He made his senior debut with the B team in the Segunda División B.

In the summer of 2013, Mode was one of several youth players called by manager Unai Emery for preseason with the main squad. On 11 May 2014, as the coach was resting several starters for the final of the UEFA Europa League, he played his only game in La Liga, coming on as a 74th-minute substitute for Diogo Figueiras in a 1–0 away loss against Getafe CF.

On 26 August 2015, Mode joined CD Alcoyano also of the third tier. The following year he moved to another reserve team, Atlético Levante UD in the same league.

Mode signed with fellow third-division club Albacete Balompié on 14 December 2016, after cutting ties with Levante. Until his retirement, he competed exclusively in the lower leagues and amateur football.
