= 1955 Copa del Generalísimo Juvenil =

Tournament details
- Country: Spain
- Teams: 60

Final positions
- Champions: Real Sociedad
- Runners-up: Sevilla

Tournament statistics
- Matches played: 55
- Goals scored: 215 (3.91 per match)

The 1955 Copa del Generalísimo Juvenil was the fifth staging of the tournament. The competition began on May 1, 1955, and ended on June 5, 1955, with the final.

== First round ==
Team 1	Score	Team 2
Manresa	7–1	Puigvertenc
Tortosa	3–1	Lleida
Sant Joan Despí	0–6	España Industrial
Columbo	1–2	Granollers
Vilafranca	0–6	FC Barcelona
Mataró	0–2	Martinenc
Olot	2–4	Espanyol
Terrassa	7–1	Arrahona
Castellón	1–0	Castellonense
Valencia	7–0	Naval de Cartagena
Sevilla	–	Extremadura
Zaragoza	2–1	Huesca
Altos de Duero	1–3	Arenas de Zaragoza
Arnao	1–0	Gijón
Oviedo	2–3	Caudal
Astillero	1–2	Rayo Cantabria
Oza	0–4	Coruñés
Pontevedra	5–2	Silva
Imperial Núñez	2–3	Alondras
Euskalduna	0–1	Txistu
Larache	2–3	España de Tánger
Melilla	3–0	Sangre Deportiva
Oberena	1–3	Iruña
Portugalete	3–2	Firestone
Real Sociedad	7–2	Deusto
Real Madrid	–	Torrejón
Plus Ultra	–	Atlético Madrid

== Second round ==
Team 1	Score	Team 2
Espanyol	1–0	España Industrial
Tortosa	3–1	Zaragoza
Terrassa	1–0	Manresa
Atlético Baleares	1–5	FC Barcelona
Arenas de Zaragoza	3–0	Iruña
Granollers	2–1	Martinenc
Coruñés	1–2	Racing de Santander
Imperial Núñez	2–3	Pontevedra
Portugalete	1–2	Txistu
África Ceutí	4–3	Melilla
Caudal	1–0	Arnao
Valencia	2–2	Castellón
Rayo Cantabria	1–2	Real Sociedad
Pilar de Tetuán	1–3	España de Tánger
Sevilla	3–0	Plus Ultra
Real Madrid	4–0	Salamanca

== Third round ==
Team 1	Score	Team 2
Espanyol	1–0	Terrassa
Granollers	1–6	FC Barcelona
Arenas de Zaragoza	3–0	Tortosa
Castellón	1–3	Sevilla
Real Sociedad	5–1	Txistu
Racing de Santander	2–0	Real Madrid
Caudal	2–1	Pontevedra
Ceuta	–	España de Tánger

== Quarterfinals ==
Team 1	Score	Team 2
FC Barcelona	1–1	Espanyol
Racing de Santander	6–0	Caudal
Sevilla	4–0	España de Tánger
Real Sociedad	3–0	Arenas de Zaragoza

=== Replay Game ===
Team 1	Score	Team 2
FC Barcelona	0–0	Espanyol

== Semifinals ==
Team 1	Score	Team 2
Real Sociedad	4–0	Racing de Santander
Sevilla	2–1	FC Barcelona

== Final ==
Team 1	Score	Team 2
Real Sociedad	2–0	Sevilla

Copa del Generalísimo
Winners
Real Sociedad
