= Andy Escudero =

Spanish footballer

Personal information
- Full name: Andy Escudero Jara
- Date of birth: 10 July 1999 (age 27)
- Place of birth: Alicante, Spain
- Height: 1.78 m (5 ft 10 in)
- Position: Winger

Team information
- Current team: Hércules
- Number: 7

Youth career
- Hércules
- 2013–2018: Atlético Madrid

Senior career*
Years	Team	Apps	(Gls)
2018–2019	Atlético Madrid B	0	(0)
2018–2019	→ SS Reyes (loan)	21	(2)
2019–2020	Murcia	4	(0)
2020–2021	Intercity	30	(2)
2021–2022	Alcoyano	34	(2)
2022–2024	Gimnàstic	57	(4)
2024–2026	Ceuta	37	(6)
2026–	Hércules	17	(3)
- * Club domestic league appearances and goals as of 10 June 2026

Andy Escudero Jara (born 10 July 1999) is a Spanish professional footballer who plays as a left winger for Hércules.

== Career ==
Escudero was born in Alicante, Valencian Community, and joined Atlético de Madrid's youth setup at the age of 14, from hometown side Hércules CF. On 21 July 2018, after finishing his formation, he was loaned to Segunda División B side UD San Sebastián de los Reyes for the season.

Escudero made his senior debut on 26 August 2018, starting and scoring Sanse's first in a 2–2 away draw against Real Valladolid B. On 7 August of the following year, he signed for Real Murcia also in the third division.

On 29 January 2020, after being rarely used, Escudero left Murcia and joined Tercera División side CF Intercity. On 9 July 2021, after helping the latter side in their promotion to Segunda División RFEF, he agreed to a deal with CD Alcoyano in Primera División RFEF.

On 12 July 2022, Escudero moved to Gimnàstic de Tarragona also in division three. On 7 July 2024, he joined fellow league team AD Ceuta FC.

Escudero scored a career-best seven goals during the season as Ceuta achieved promotion to Segunda División. He made his professional debut at the age of 26 on 15 August 2025, starting in a 3–0 away loss to Real Valladolid.

On 19 January 2026, after just one further league match, Escudero terminated his link with the Caballas, and returned to his first club Hércules hours later.

== Personal life ==
Escudero's father Paquito was also a footballer. A midfielder, he spent the most of his career with Hércules.
