= Mario Rodríguez (footballer, born 1997) =

Spanish footballer

Personal information
- Full name: Mario Rodríguez Ruiz
- Date of birth: 3 March 1997 (age 29)
- Place of birth: Barcelona, Spain
- Height: 1.76 m (5 ft 9 in)
- Position: Winger

Team information
- Current team: Conquense
- Number: 20

Youth career
- 2003–2007: Sant Joan Despí
- 2007–2011: Cornellà
- 2011–2016: Real Madrid

Senior career*
| Years | Team | Apps | (Gls) |
| 2016–2018 | Real Madrid B | 15 | (0) |
| 2017–2018 | → Sabadell (loan) | 20 | (0) |
| 2018–2019 | Peralada | 29 | (2) |
| 2019–2020 | Granada B | 27 | (4) |
| 2019–2020 | Granada | 1 | (0) |
| 2020–2022 | Warta Poznań | 29 | (1) |
| 2022 | Levante B | 8 | (2) |
| 2022–2023 | Compostela | 30 | (9) |
| 2023–2025 | Gimnàstic | 22 | (1) |
| 2025 | Sanluqueño | 9 | (0) |
| 2025– | = Conquense | 23 | (4) |

International career
| 2013 | Spain U16 | 1 | (1) |
- * Club domestic league appearances and goals as of 7 May 2026

Mario Rodríguez Ruiz, known as Mario Rodríguez (born 3 March 1997) is a Spanish professional footballer who plays as a left winger for Segunda Federación club Conquense.

== Club career ==
Born in Barcelona, Catalonia, Rodríguez joined Real Madrid's La Fábrica in 2011, from UE Cornellà. In 2016, after finishing his formation, he was promoted to the reserves in Segunda División B, and made his senior debut on 20 August of that year by starting in a 3–2 home win against Real Sociedad B.

On 3 August 2017, after featuring sparingly, Rodríguez was loaned to fellow third division side CE Sabadell FC, for one year. The following 10 July, he cut ties with Los Blancos and agreed to a contract with Girona FC, being assigned to farm team CF Peralada-Girona B still in division three.

On 30 July 2019, Rodríguez joined another reserve team, Club Recreativo Granada also in the third level. He made his first team debut on 17 December, starting in a 3–2 away win against CE L'Hospitalet, for the season's Copa del Rey.

Rodríguez made his La Liga debut on 1 July 2020, coming on as a late substitute for Gil Dias in a 2–0 away defeat of Deportivo Alavés. On 15 September, he moved to abroad and signed with Polish side Warta Poznań.

Rodríguez returned to Spain in March 2022, joining Levante UD's reserves in Segunda División RFEF. On 29 July, he moved to fellow league team SD Compostela.

On 3 July 2023, Rodríguez signed a two-year contract with Gimnàstic de Tarragona in Primera Federación. On 25 January 2025, he terminated his link with the club, and joined fellow league team Atlético Sanluqueño CF the following day.
