= Jordi Pola =

Spanish footballer

Personal information
- Full name: Jordi González-Pola González
- Date of birth: 12 April 2000 (age 26)
- Place of birth: Barcelona, Spain
- Height: 1.91 m (6 ft 3 in)
- Position: Centre back

Team information
- Current team: Alcorcón
- Number: 19

Youth career
- Sporting Gijón

Senior career*
Years	Team	Apps	(Gls)
2019–2020	Sporting Gijón B	0	(0)
2019	→ Caudal (loan)	1	(0)
2019–2020	→ Urraca (loan)	22	(1)
2020–2021	Lealtad	19	(1)
2021–2023	Sporting Gijón B	46	(2)
2022–2023	Sporting Gijón	8	(0)
2023–2025	Nacional	20	(0)
2024–2025	→ Tondela (loan)	5	(0)
2025–	Alcorcón	40	(1)
- * Club domestic league appearances and goals as of 10 June 2026

Jordi González-Pola González (born 12 April 2000) is a Spanish professional footballer who plays as a centre-back for Alcorcón in Primera Federación – Group 2.

== Club career ==
Born in Barcelona, Catalonia, Pola was a Sporting de Gijón youth graduate. On 23 August 2019, after finishing his formation, he was loaned to Tercera División side Caudal Deportivo for the season.

On 3 October 2019, after just 27 minutes of action, Pola moved to fellow fourth tier side Urraca also in a temporary deal. On 25 August 2020, he signed for Segunda División B side Lealtad.

On 18 June 2021, Pola returned to Sporting and was assigned to the reserves in Tercera División RFEF. He made his first team debut on 29 May, starting in a 0–1 Segunda División home loss against Las Palmas.

On 23 July 2023, Liga Portugal 2 club Nacional announced the signing of Pola on a three-year deal, after his contract with Sporting Gijón had expired. In his first season, he contributed to Nacional's promotion to the top tier, mostly as a substitute. On 15 August 2024, Pola moved on loan to Tondela in Liga Portugal 2.

On 3 February 2025, Pola moved to Alcorcón in the Spanish third tier on a free transfer.
