= 2010 Copa del Rey Juvenil =

Tournament details
- Country: Spain
- Teams: 16

Final positions
- Champions: Athletic Club
- Runners-up: Real Madrid

Tournament statistics
- Matches played: 29

The 2010 Copa del Rey Juvenil was the 60th staging of the tournament. The competition began on 16 May and ended on 26 June with the final.

== First round ==
Team 1	Agg.	Team 2	1st leg	2nd leg
Athletic	4–0	Racing Santander	3–0	1-0
Real Sociedad	4–5	Deportivo La Coruña	1–1	3–4
Las Palmas	2–5	Real Madrid	2–1	0–4
Tenerife	2–6	Atlético Madrid	2–5	0–1
Valencia	(a) 3–3	Barcelona	1–1	2–2
Almería	1–6	Espanyol	0–4	1–2
Gimnàstic Tarragona	1–3	UE Cornellà	0–2	1–1
Real Betis	(a) 3–3	Real Valladolid	1–0	1–2

== Quarterfinals ==
Team 1	Agg.	Team 2	1st leg	2nd leg
Valencia	3–2	Real Betis	1–1	2–1
Atlético Madrid	1–6	Espanyol	1–2	0–4
UE Cornellà	1–5	Real Madrid	1–1	0–4
Deportivo La Coruña	1–2	Athletic	1–0	0–2

== Semifinals ==
Team 1	Agg.	Team 2	1st leg	2nd leg
Espanyol	3–8	Real Madrid	3–4	0–4
Athletic	4–2	Valencia	2–1	2–1

== Final ==
26 June 2010
21:30

Real Madrid	0-2	Athletic Club
	Report	Peña 12'; Villar 32'

Estadio Municipal Francisco Bonet, Almuñécar
Attendance: 4,000
Referee: Mr. Melero López

Real Madrid:
GK	(Spain) Pacheco
DF	(Spain) Carvajal
DF	(Spain) Capote
DF	(Spain) Molero
DF	(Spain) Jaime (substituted off) 62'
MF	(Spain) Álvaro López (substituted off) 72'
MF	(Spain) Lucas Vázquez (substituted off) 78'
MF	(Spain) Álex
MF	(Spain) Fran Sol
MF	(Spain) Óscar Plano (yellow card)
FW	(Spain) Sarabia (yellow card)
Substitutes:
FW	(Brazil) Alípio (substituted on) 62'
MF	(Spain) Kamal (substituted on) 72'
FW	(Spain) Sobrino (substituted on) 78'
	(Spain) Expósito
Manager:
(Spain) Alberto Toril

Athletic Club:
GK	(Spain) Magunazelaia
DF	(Spain) Aurtenetxe (yellow card)
DF	(Spain) Bilbo
DF	(Spain) Ramalho
DF	(Spain) Saborit
MF	(Spain) Eguaras (substituted off) 82'
MF	(Spain) Jonxa Vidal (yellow card)
MF	(Spain) Peña (yellow card)
MF	(Spain) Ruiz de Galarreta (substituted off) 66'
FW	(Spain) Villar (substituted off) 92'
FW	(Spain) Guillermo (substituted off) 85'
Substitutes:
DF	(Spain) Bustinza (substituted on) 66'
DF	(Spain) Altamira (substituted on) 82'
FW	(Spain) Alkuaz (substituted on) 85'
DF	(Spain) Jon García (substituted on) 92'
Manager:
(Spain) Bingen Arostegi

Copa del Rey Juvenil
Winners
Athletic Club

== See also ==
- 2013 Copa del Rey Juvenil (final played between same clubs)
- 2009–10 División de Honor Juvenil de Fútbol
