= Dani Fernández (footballer, born 1997) =

Spanish footballer

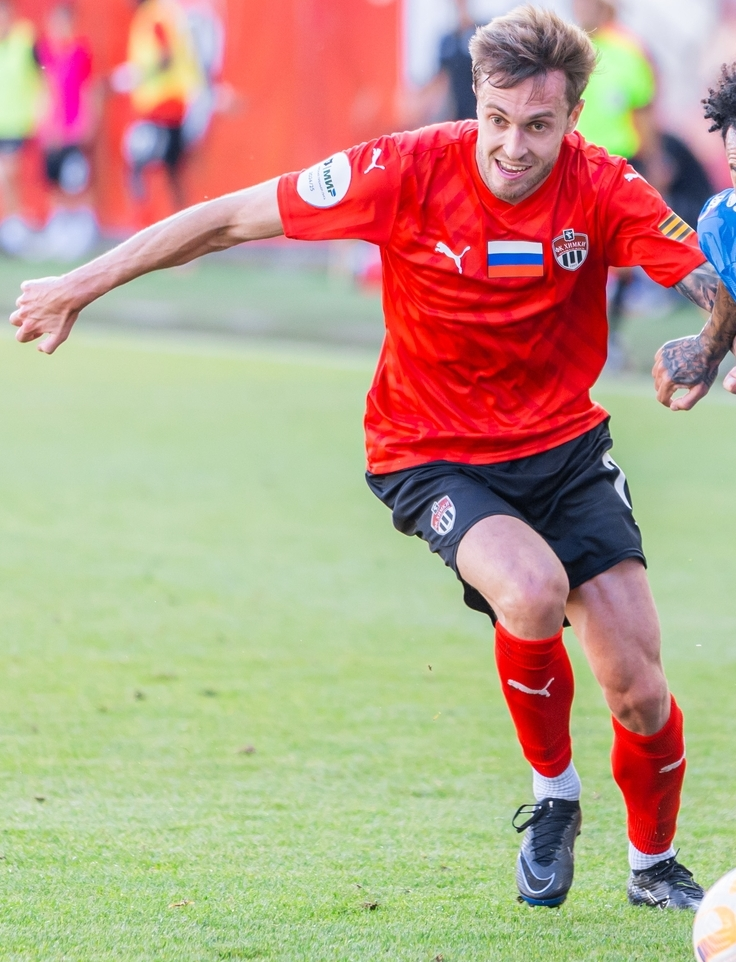

Personal information
- Full name: Daniel Fernández Fernández
- Date of birth: 30 April 1997 (age 29)
- Place of birth: Madrid, Spain
- Height: 1.76 m (5 ft 9 in)
- Position: Right back

Team information
- Current team: Krylia Sovetov Samara
- Number: 72

Youth career
- 2004–2008: Valdemoro
- 2008–2011: Getafe
- 2011–2012: Leganés
- 2012–2015: Real Madrid

Senior career*
Years	Team	Apps	(Gls)
2015–2019	Real Madrid B	33	(0)
2016–2017	→ Mérida (loan)	20	(0)
2017–2018	→ Fuenlabrada (loan)	24	(2)
2019–2020	Fuenlabrada	13	(0)
2020–2022	Badajoz	52	(1)
2022–2024	Racing Santander	57	(1)
2024–2025	Khimki	20	(0)
2025–2026	Asteras Tripolis	11	(0)
2026–	Krylia Sovetov Samara	14	(0)
- * Club domestic league appearances and goals as of 20 November 2026

Daniel Fernández Fernández (born 30 April 1997) is a Spanish professional footballer who plays as a right back for Russian Premier League club Krylia Sovetov Samara.

== Career ==
Fernández was born in Madrid, and joined Real Madrid's La Fábrica in 2012, from CD Leganés. He made his senior debut with the reserves on 18 October 2015, starting in a 1–0 Segunda División B away win against CD Toledo.

On 5 August 2016, Fernández was loaned to fellow third division side Mérida AD. On 31 August 2017, he moved to CF Fuenlabrada in the same category, also in a temporary deal.

Fernández returned to Real Madrid in July 2018, being assigned to the B-team. On 24 July 2019, he returned to Fuenla after agreeing to a permanent one-year deal.

Fernández made his professional debut on 17 August 2019, coming on as a late substitute for José Fran in a 2–0 away defeat of Elche CF. On 10 August of the following year, after featuring sparingly, he signed for third division side CD Badajoz.

On 6 July 2022, Fernández moved to Segunda División side Racing de Santander on a two-year deal.

On 31 July 2024, Fernández joined Khimki in the Russian Premier League.

On 21 January 2026, Fernández returned to Russia and signed with Krylia Sovetov Samara.

== Career statistics ==
As of match played 20 November 2026

Appearances and goals by club, season and competition
Club	Season	League			Cup		Other		Total	
Club	Season	Division	Apps	Goals	Apps	Goals	Apps	Goals	Apps	Goals
Real Madrid Castilla	2015–16	Segunda División B	17	0	—		—		17	0
Real Madrid Castilla	2018–19	Segunda División B	19	0	—		—		19	0
Real Madrid Castilla	Total		36	0	—		—		36	0
Mérida (loan)	2016–17	Segunda División B	20	0	—		—		20	0
Fuenlabrada (loan)	2017–18	Segunda División B	24	2	3	0	2 (Note: Appearances in Segunda División B play-offs)	0	29	2
Fuenlabrada	2019–20	Segunda División	13	0	2	0	—		15	0
Badajoz	2020–21	Segunda División B	25	0	1	0	—		26	0
Badajoz	2021–22	Primera Federación	26	1	0	0	—		26	1
Badajoz	Total		51	1	1	0	—		52	1
Racing Santander	2022–23	Primera Federación	35	0	0	0	—		35	0
Racing Santander	2023–24	Primera Federación	22	1	0	0	—		22	1
Racing Santander	Total		57	1	0	0	—		57	1
Khimki	2024–25	Russian Premier League	20	0	4	0	—		24	0
Asteras Tripolis	2025–26	Super League Greece	11	0	4	0	—		15	0
Krylia Sovetov Samara	2025–26	Russian Premier League	6	0	2	1	—		8	1
Krylia Sovetov Samara	2026–27	Russian Premier League	8	0	5	0	—		13	0
Krylia Sovetov Samara	Total		14	0	7	1	0	0	21	1
Career total			246	4	21	1	2	0	269	5
