= Pepe Palau =

Spanish footballer

Personal information
- Full name: José Palau Mira
- Date of birth: 24 February 1992 (age 34)
- Place of birth: Ibi, Spain
- Height: 1.70 m (5 ft 7 in)
- Position: Midfielder

Team information
- Current team: Rayo Ibense

Youth career
- 1999–2007: Valencia
- 2007–2011: Barcelona

Senior career*
Years	Team	Apps	(Gls)
2011	Barcelona B	1	(0)
2011–2012	Villarreal C	33	(0)
2012–2015	Villarreal B	54	(0)
2015–2016	Cartagena	11	(0)
2016	→ Jumilla (loan)	6	(0)
2016–2017	La Roda	23	(0)
2017	Eldense	4	(0)
2018–	Rayo Ibense	27	(1)
- * Club domestic league appearances and goals as of 19 May 2019

José "Pepe" Palau Mira (born 24 February 1992) is a Spanish footballer who plays for UD Rayo Ibense as a midfielder.

== Club career ==
Born in Ibi, Province of Alicante, Valencian Community, Palau joined FC Barcelona's youth academy in 2007, at the age of 15. He made his debut as senior on 29 May 2011 with their reserves, playing 14 minutes in a 5–1 home win against UD Salamanca when he was still a Juvenil A player.

In July 2011, Palau signed for Villarreal CF, going on to represent its C and B-teams during his spell. On 13 April 2012, with the latter, he appeared in his second Segunda División match, against UD Almería.

Palau spent the remainder of his career in the lower leagues, representing in quick succession FC Cartagena, FC Jumilla, La Roda CF and CD Eldense.
