= Kilian Grant =

Spanish footballer

Personal information
- Full name: Kilian Grant Carvalheira
- Date of birth: 18 May 1994 (age 32)
- Place of birth: Figueres, Spain
- Height: 1.80 m (5 ft 11 in)
- Position: Forward

Team information
- Current team: FC Santa Coloma
- Number: 9

Youth career
- FE Figueres
- 2008–2014: Espanyol

Senior career*
| Years | Team | Apps | (Gls) |
| 2012–2014 | Espanyol B | 31 | (2) |
| 2014 | → Olot (loan) | 13 | (0) |
| 2014–2016 | Zaragoza B | 58 | (22) |
| 2015–2016 | Zaragoza | 1 | (0) |
| 2016–2017 | Almudévar | 20 | (9) |
| 2016–2018 | Huesca | 12 | (0) |
| 2018–2019 | UCAM Murcia | 31 | (5) |
| 2019–2021 | Olot | 56 | (2) |
| 2021–2022 | Real Avilés | 24 | (1) |
| 2022–2023 | FC Santa Coloma | 20 | (3) |
| 2023–2024 | Inter Club d'Escaldes | 5 | (0) |
| 2025– | FC Santa Coloma | 4 | (2) |
- * Club domestic league appearances and goals as of 10 June 2025

Kilian Grant Carvalheira (born 18 May 1994) is a Spanish footballer who plays for FC Santa Coloma, in Andorran Primera Divisió, as a forward.

== Club career ==
Born in Figueres, Girona, Catalonia, Kilian was a RCD Espanyol youth graduate and made his debut as a senior with the reserves in the 2011–12 campaign, in the Tercera División.

On 26 January 2014, Kilian joined UE Olot in Segunda División B, on loan until the end of the season. After his loan expired, he moved to another reserve team, Real Zaragoza B also in the third tier.

Kilian made his professional debut on 19 December 2015, coming on as a second-half substitute for Jorge Díaz in a 1–3 away loss against Gimnàstic de Tarragona in the Segunda División. On 10 July of the following year, he signed for SD Huesca, being assigned to the farm team in the fourth tier.

Kilian scored his first professional goal on 20 December 2016, but in a 1–2 away loss against UD Las Palmas in the season's Copa del Rey. In late April, he suffered a knee injury which took him out for six months.

On 9 August 2018, Kilian joined UCAM Murcia CF in the third division.
