= Albert Miravent =

Spanish footballer

Personal information
- Full name: Albert Miravent Sans
- Date of birth: 14 June 1994 (age 32)
- Place of birth: Tarragona, Spain
- Height: 1.77 m (5 ft 10 in)
- Position: Midfielder

Team information
- Current team: Ascó

Youth career
- Gimnàstic
- 2008–2013: Espanyol

Senior career*
Years	Team	Apps	(Gls)
2012–2014	Espanyol B	9	(0)
2014	San Marino	1	(0)
2015	Pobla Mafumet	19	(0)
2016	Teruel	9	(0)
2016–2019	Reus B	83	(1)
2019–2020	Castelldefels	11	(0)
2020–2021	Pobla Mafumet	26	(0)
2021–2022	Ascó	27	(0)
2022–2024	Reus FCR	50	(0)
2024–	Ascó	55	(0)

International career
2010	Spain U17	1	(0)
2012	Spain U18	2	(0)
2012	Spain U20	4	(0)
- * Club domestic league appearances and goals as of 9 May 2026

Albert Miravent Sans (born 14 June 1994) is a Spanish footballer who plays as a midfielder for FC Ascó.

== Club career ==
Born in Tarragona, Catalonia, Miravent joined RCD Espanyol's youth setup in 2008, aged 14, after starting it out at Gimnàstic de Tarragona. He made his senior debuts with the former's reserves in the 2011–12 campaign, being promoted from Tercera División.

On 11 July 2014 Miravent moved abroad for the first time in his career, joining Italian Lega Pro side San Marino Calcio. He made his professional debut on 13 September, coming on as a late substitute in a 1–1 home draw against Carrarese Calcio.

On 8 January 2015 Miravent and compatriot Gil Muntadas rescinded his link with the club. Both returned to their home country and signed for fourth level's CF Pobla de Mafumet seven days later.
