= Gil Muntadas =

Spanish footballer

Personal information
- Full name: Gil Muntadas Camprubí
- Date of birth: 25 September 1993 (age 33)
- Place of birth: Vic, Spain
- Height: 1.79 m (5 ft 10 in)
- Position: Midfielder

Team information
- Current team: Terrassa
- Number: 7

Youth career
- Espanyol

Senior career*
Years	Team	Apps	(Gls)
2012–2013	Sevilla C	27	(0)
2013–2014	Sevilla B	21	(0)
2014–2015	San Marino	4	(1)
2015–2017	Pobla Mafumet	49	(3)
2017–2018	Figueres	28	(8)
2018–2022	Costa Brava	94	(11)
2022–2023	Cornellà	57	(3)
2023–	Terrassa	77	(11)
- * Club domestic league appearances and goals as of 15 May 2026

Gil Muntadas Camprubí (born 25 September 1993), simply known as Gil, is a Spanish footballer who plays for Terrassa as a central midfielder.

== Club career ==
Born in Vic, Barcelona, Catalonia, Gil played youth football with RCD Espanyol, and joined Sevilla FC on 10 July 2012, being immediately assigned to the C-team in Tercera División. In the 2013 summer he was promoted to the reserves, in Segunda División B.

On 11 July 2014 Gil moved abroad for the first time in his career, joining Italian Lega Pro side San Marino Calcio. He made his professional debut on 30 August, starting and scoring the first in a 1–1 home draw against A.C. Prato.

On 8 January 2015 Gil and compatriot Albert Miravent rescinded his link with the club. Both returned to their home country and signed for fourth level's CF Pobla de Mafumet seven days later.
