= UE Vic =

Association football club in Spain

- Full name: Unió Esportiva Vic
- Founded: 1922
- Ground: Hipòlit Planàs Stadium, Vic, Catalonia, Spain
- Capacity: 4,000
- Chairman: Ignasi Puig Vall
- Manager: Ramon Carrascal Rierola
- League: Tercera Federación – Group 5
- 2024–25: Lliga Elit, 1st of 16 (champions)
Home colours	Away colours

Unió Esportiva Vic, is a Spanish football team based in Vic, in Catalonia. Founded in 1922, it plays in Tercera Federación – Group 5, holding home games at Estadi Hipòlit Planàs, with a capacity of 4,000 spectators.

== History ==
Unió Esportiva Vic was founded in 1943, but its current date corresponds to the old club of the city: Vic Football Club (1922). On 4 June 2010, the club bought the place of Unió Esportiva Aiguafreda in the Primera Catalana.

== Season to season ==
Season	Tier	Division	Place	Copa del Rey
1939–40	5	1ª Reg. B	5th	
1940–41	3	3ª	4th	
1941–42	3	1ª Reg.	10th	
1942–43	4	1ª Reg. B	7th	
1943–44	5	1ª Reg. B	1st	
1944–45	4	1ª Reg.	6th	
1945–46	4	1ª Reg.	11th	
1946–47	4	1ª Reg.	5th	
1947–48	4	1ª Reg.	12th	
1948–49	4	1ª Reg.	7th	
1949–50	4	1ª Reg.	4th	
1950–51	4	1ª Reg.	6th	
1951–52	4	1ª Reg.	14th	
1952–53	4	1ª Reg.	2nd	
1953–54	3	3ª	15th	
1954–55	3	3ª	4th	
1955–56	3	3ª	8th	
1956–57	3	3ª	13th	
1957–58	3	3ª	16th	
1958–59	3	3ª	16th	

Season	Tier	Division	Place	Copa del Rey
1959–60	3	3ª	10th	
1960–61	3	3ª	16th	
1961–62	4	1ª Reg.	1st	
1962–63	3	3ª	10th	
1963–64	3	3ª	17th	
1964–65	3	3ª	13th	
1965–66	3	3ª	13th	
1966–67	3	3ª	20th	
1967–68	4	1ª Reg.	6th	
1968–69	4	Reg. Pref.	6th	
1969–70	4	Reg. Pref.	9th	
1970–71	5	1ª Reg.	11th	
1971–72	5	1ª Reg.	6th	
1972–73	5	1ª Reg.	1st	
1973–74	4	Reg. Pref.	7th	
1974–75	4	Reg. Pref.	14th	
1975–76	4	Reg. Pref.	13th	
1976–77	4	Reg. Pref.	10th	
1977–78	4	3ª	20th	First round
1978–79	5	Reg. Pref.	4th	

Season	Tier	Division	Place	Copa del Rey
1979–80	5	Reg. Pref.	4th	
1980–81	5	Reg. Pref.	3rd	
1981–82	4	3ª	10th	
1982–83	4	3ª	13th	
1983–84	4	3ª	20th	
1984–85	5	Reg. Pref.	3rd	
1985–86	5	Reg. Pref.	2nd	
1986–87	4	3ª	17th	
1987–88	4	3ª	13th	
1988–89	4	3ª	21st	
1989–90	5	Reg. Pref.	3rd	
1990–91	5	Reg. Pref.	16th	
1991–92	6	Pref. Terr.	10th	
1992–93	6	Pref. Terr.	1st	
1993–94	5	1ª Cat.	12th	
1994–95	5	1ª Cat.	7th	
1995–96	5	1ª Cat.	15th	
1996–97	5	1ª Cat.	11th	
1997–98	5	1ª Cat.	3rd	
1998–99	4	3ª	16th	

Season	Tier	Division	Place	Copa del Rey
1999–2000	4	3ª	20th	
2000–01	5	1ª Cat.	12th	
2001–02	5	1ª Cat.	13th	
2002–03	5	1ª Cat.	20th	
2003–04	6	Pref. Terr.	8th	
2004–05	6	Pref. Terr.	3rd	
2005–06	6	Pref. Terr.	7th	
2006–07	6	Pref. Terr.	5th	
2007–08	6	Pref. Terr.	7th	
2008–09	6	Pref. Terr.	7th	
2009–10	6	Pref. Terr.	11th	
2010–11	5	1ª Cat.	2nd	
2011–12	4	3ª	14th	
2012–13	4	3ª	19th	
2013–14	5	1ª Cat.	4th	
2014–15	5	1ª Cat.	12th	
2015–16	5	1ª Cat.	7th	
2016–17	5	1ª Cat.	8th	
2017–18	5	1ª Cat.	4th	
2018–19	5	1ª Cat.	7th	

Season	Tier	Division	Place	Copa del Rey
2019–20	5	1ª Cat.	5th	
2020–21	5	1ª Cat.	3rd	
2021–22	6	1ª Cat.	7th	
2022–23	6	1ª Cat.	3rd	
2023–24	6	Lliga Elit	3rd	
2024–25	6	Lliga Elit	1st	First round
2025–26	5	3ª Fed.	17th	
2026–27	6	Lliga Elit		

- 26 seasons in Tercera División
- 1 season in Tercera Federación

== Current squad ==
Note: Flags indicate national team as defined under FIFA eligibility rules; some limited exceptions apply. Players may hold more than one non-FIFA nationality.

No.	Pos.	Nation	Player
1	GK	ESP	Agustín Mora
2	DF	ESP	Oriol Coromines
3	DF	ESP	Ot Bofill
4	DF	ESP	Gil Bertrana
5	DF	ESP	Edgar Banús
6	MF	ESP	Martí Riera
7	FW	ESP	Ignasi Armengou
8	MF	ESP	Juli Berenguer
9	MF	ESP	Ivan Amoedo
10	MF	ESP	Pius Quer
11	FW	ESP	Arnau Prat
12	FW	ECU	Joao Valencia
13	GK	ESP	Jordi Cereza

No.	Pos.	Nation	Player
14	MF	ESP	Marc Colomer
15	DF	ESP	Jon Lobo
16	MF	ESP	Ernest Girbau
17	DF	ESP	Albert Estellés
—	DF	ESP	Roger Cunill
18	FW	ESP	Chema Moreno
19	DF	ESP	Adrià Pladevall
20	MF	ESP	Alberto Salamanca
21	MF	ESP	Nil Garrido
22	FW	ESP	Manel Valdivia
23	FW	ESP	Manel Martínez
—	DF	ESP	Eric Vega
24	MF	ESP	Marc Cuello
