= 2020–21 Real Zaragoza season =

Real Zaragoza
2020–21 season
- President: Christian Lapetra
- Head coach: Rubén Baraja (until 9 November); Iván Martínez (from 11 November until 13 December); Juan Ignacio Martínez (from 14 December)
- Stadium: La Romareda
- Segunda División: 15th
- Copa del Rey: Second round
- Top goalscorer: League: Juanjo Narváez (9); All: Juanjo Narváez (9)
- Biggest win: Alcorcón 0–3 Zaragoza; Zaragoza 3–0 Castellón
- Biggest defeat: Girona 3–0 Zaragoza
Home colours	Away colours
- All statistics correct as of 30 May 2021.

The 2020–21 Real Zaragoza season was the club's 89th season in existence and the eighth consecutive season in the second division of Spanish football. In addition to the domestic league, Real Zaragoza participated in this season's edition of the Copa del Rey. The season covered the period from 17 August 2020 to 30 June 2021.

== Players ==
=== First-team squad ===
As of 28 January 2021

Note: Flags indicate national team as defined under FIFA eligibility rules; some limited exceptions apply. Players may hold more than one non-FIFA nationality.

No.	Pos.	Nation	Player
1	GK	ARG	Cristian Álvarez
2	DF	ESP	Carlos Vigaray
3	DF	ESP	Jair Amador
4	DF	FRA	Mathieu Peybernes (on loan from Almería)
5	DF	ESP	Álvaro Tejero (on loan from Eibar)
6	DF	ESP	Alejandro Francés
7	FW	COL	Juanjo Narváez
8	MF	ESP	Adrián
9	MF	SLO	Haris Vučkić
10	MF	ESP	Javi Ros (vice-captain)
11	FW	ITA	Luca Zanimacchia (on loan from Juventus)
12	MF	NGR	James Igbekeme

No.	Pos.	Nation	Player
13	GK	ESP	Álvaro Ratón
14	FW	URU	Gabriel Fernández (on loan from Celta Vigo)
15	DF	ESP	Pep Chavarría
16	MF	ESP	Íñigo Eguaras
17	DF	ESP	Carlos Nieto
18	DF	ESP	Pichu Atienza
19	FW	ESP	Álex Alegría (on loan from Mallorca)
21	MF	ESP	Alberto Zapater (captain)
22	MF	ESP	Sergio Bermejo
23	FW	ESP	Gaizka Larrazabal
27	MF	ESP	Francho Serrano
28	MF	URU	Juan Manuel Sanabria (on loan from Atlético Madrid)

=== Reserve team ===
Note: Flags indicate national team as defined under FIFA eligibility rules; some limited exceptions apply. Players may hold more than one non-FIFA nationality.

No.	Pos.	Nation	Player
28	DF	ESP	Andrés Borge
30	FW	ESP	Jaime Sancho
31	FW	ESP	Iván Azón
32	FW	ESP	Luis Carbonell

No.	Pos.	Nation	Player
33	DF	ESP	Antonio Sola
34	MF	ESP	Iván Castillo
39	DF	ESP	Javi Hernández
41	GK	ESP	Carlos Azón

=== Out on loan ===
Note: Flags indicate national team as defined under FIFA eligibility rules; some limited exceptions apply. Players may hold more than one non-FIFA nationality.

No.	Pos.	Nation	Player
—	DF	ESP	Dani Lasure (at Leganés until 30 June 2021)
—	DF	ESP	Eduardo Mingotes (at Valencia Mestalla until 30 June 2021)
—	DF	ESP	Enrique Clemente (at Logroñés until 30 June 2021)
—	MF	GEQ	Jannick Buyla (at UCAM Murcia until 30 June 2021)

No.	Pos.	Nation	Player
—	MF	GEQ	Federico Bikoro (at Badalona until 30 June 2021)
—	MF	ESP	Marc Aguado (at Andorra until 30 June 2021)
—	FW	ESP	Marcos Baselga (at Atlético Baleares until 30 June 2021)

== Pre-season and friendlies ==
Win Draw Loss

12 September 2020 Friendly	Zaragoza	0–2	Getafe	Zaragoza, Spain
18:30 CEST (UTC+2)			Keita 5'; Mata 26' (pen.)	Stadium: La Romareda; Attendance: 0

== Competitions ==
=== Overview ===
Competition	First match	Last match	Starting round	Final position	Record							
Competition	First match	Last match	Starting round	Final position	Pld	W	D	L	GF	GA	GD	Win %
Segunda División	12 September 2020	30 May 2021	Matchday 1	15th	42	13	11	18	37	43	−6	30.95
Copa del Rey	16 December 2020	5 January 2021	First round	Second round	2	1	0	1	3	2	+1	50.00
Total					44	14	11	19	40	45	−5	31.82

Source: Soccerway

=== Segunda División ===
==== League table ====
Pos	Team	Pld	W	D	L	GF	GA	GD	Pts
13	Oviedo	42	11	19	12	45	46	−1	52 (Note: Head-to-head points: Oviedo: 4, Tenerife: 1)
14	Tenerife	42	13	13	16	36	36	0	52
15	Zaragoza	42	13	11	18	37	43	−6	50
16	Cartagena	42	12	13	17	44	52	−8	49
17	Alcorcón	42	13	9	20	32	42	−10	48

Source: LaLiga
Rules for classification: 1) points; 2) head-to-head points; 3) head-to-head goal difference; 4) goal difference; 5) number of goals scored

==== Results summary ====
Overall								Home						Away					
Pld	W	D	L	GF	GA	GD	Pts	W	D	L	GF	GA	GD	W	D	L	GF	GA	GD
42	13	11	18	37	43	−6	50	9	7	5	20	17	+3	4	4	13	17	26	−9

Source: La Liga

==== Results by round ====
Round	1	2	3	4	5	6	7	8	9	10	11	12	13	14	15	16	17	18	19	20	21	22	23	24	25	26	27	28	29	30	31	32	33	34	35	36	37	38	39	40	41	42
Ground	H	A	H	A	H	H	A	H	A	H	A	H	A	H	A	A	H	A	H	A	H	A	H	A	A	H	A	H	A	H	A	H	A	H	A	H	A	H	A	H	A	H
Result	D	L	D	W	W	L	L	D	L	D	L	L	L	L	L	L	W	L	W	D	W	L	W	W	D	L	L	W	L	W	D	D	W	W	L	D	D	D	W	W	L	L
Position	9	15	15	10	7	11	13	14	15	16	18	19	19	19	20	21	21	21	21	21	17	21	18	17	17	17	18	17	17	16	16	16	15	14	15	15	15	15	15	10	13	15

Source: La Liga
A = Away; H = Home; W = Win; D = Draw; L = Loss

==== Matches ====
The league fixtures were announced on 31 August 2020.

26 September 2020 3	Zaragoza	2–2	Las Palmas	Zaragoza
16:00 CEST (UTC+2)	Nieto (yellow card) 10' (yellow-red card) 85'; Ros (yellow card) 16', (goal) 49'; Mendes 19' (o.g.); Atienza (yellow card) 37'; Jannick (yellow card) 63'; Adrián (yellow card) 90+4'	Report	Lemos 23', (yellow card) 57' (yellow-red card) 70'; Espiau 82'; Maikel (yellow card) 89'	Stadium: La Romareda; Attendance: 0 (Note: The match was played behind closed doors due to the COVID-19 pandemic in Spain.); Referee: Javier Iglesias Villanueva

3 October 2020 4	Alcorcón	0–3	Zaragoza	Alcorcón
16:00 CEST (UTC+2)	Fraile (yellow card) 15'	Report	Ros (yellow card) 63'; Jannick (red card) 63'	Stadium: Santo Domingo; Attendance: 0 Referee: Daniel Jesús Trujillo Suárez

11 October 2020 5	Zaragoza	1–0	Albacete	Zaragoza
18:00 CEST (UTC+2)	Eguaras (yellow card) 65'; Bermejo (yellow card) 68'; Atienza (yellow card) 75'; Narváez 88'	Report	Gorosito (yellow card) 44'; Navarro (yellow card) 73'	Stadium: La Romareda; Attendance: 0 Referee: Alejandro Muñiz Ruiz

18 October 2020 6	Zaragoza	1–2	Málaga	Zaragoza
18:15 CEST (UTC+2)		Report		Stadium: La Romareda; Attendance: 0 Referee: Miguel Ángel Ortiz Arias

22 October 2020 7	Leganés	1–0	Zaragoza	Leganés
16:30 CEST (UTC+2)	Arnaiz 57'	Report		Stadium: Estadio Municipal de Butarque; Attendance: 0 Referee: Luis Mario Milla Alvendiz

25 October 2020 8	Zaragoza	0–0	Sabadell	Zaragoza
21:00 CET (UTC+1)		Report		Stadium: La Romareda; Referee: Javier Iglesias Villanueva

29 October 2020 9	Mirandés	1–0	Zaragoza	Miranda de Ebro
19:00 CET (UTC+1)	Moha 90+2'	Report		Stadium: Anduva; Attendance: 0 Referee: Aitor Gorostegui Fernández-Ortega

1 November 2020 10	Zaragoza	0–0	Mallorca	Zaragoza
16:00 CET (UTC+1)		Report		Stadium: La Romareda; Attendance: 0

4 November 2020 1	Zaragoza	2–2	Girona	Zaragoza
19:00 CET (UTC+1)		Report		Stadium: La Romareda; Attendance: 0 Referee: Francisco José Hernández Maeso

8 November 2020 11	Tenerife	1–0	Zaragoza	Santa Cruz de Tenerife
20:30 CET (UTC+1)	Álvarez 15' (o.g.)	Report		Stadium: Heliodoro Rodríguez López; Attendance: 0 Referee: Alejandro Muñiz Ruiz

13 November 2020 12	Zaragoza	1–2	Oviedo	Zaragoza
21:00 CET (UTC+1)	Fernández 26' (o.g.)	Report	Sánchez 45'; Leschuk 49'	Stadium: La Romareda; Attendance: 0 Referee: Rubén Ávalos Barrera

22 November 2020 13	Ponferradina	2–1	Zaragoza	Ponferrada
21:00 CET (UTC+1)	Hernando (yellow card) 41'; Valcarce (yellow card) 45+3'; Sola 61' (o.g.); Curro (yellow card) 69'; Romera 78'	Report	Narváez 46'; Sola (yellow card) 73'; Eguaras (yellow card) 81'	Stadium: Estadio El Toralín; Attendance: 0 Referee: Javier Iglesias Villanueva

25 November 2020 14	Zaragoza	1–2	Rayo Vallecano	Zaragoza
19:00 CET (UTC+1)	Igbekeme 19'; Vučkić (yellow card) 55'; Nieto (yellow card) 78'	Report	Antoñín 72'; Pozo 83'; Advíncula (yellow card) 85'; Velázquez (yellow card) 88'; Valentín (yellow card) 90+2'	Stadium: La Romareda; Attendance: 0 Referee: Iosu Galech Apezteguía

29 November 2020 15	Espanyol	2–0	Zaragoza	Cornellà de Llobregat
16:00 CET (UTC+1)	L. López (yellow card) 45+1'; D. López (yellow card) 46'; Gil 69'; Embarba (yellow card) 78'; Darder 83'	Report	Serrano (yellow card) 51'	Stadium: RCDE Stadium; Attendance: 0 Referee: Juan Luis Pulido Santana

2 December 2020 16	Castellón	1–0	Zaragoza	Castellón
21:00 CET (UTC+1)	Díaz 84'; Molina (yellow card) 90+2'	Report	Chavarría (yellow card) 26'; Vigaray (yellow card) 89'	Stadium: Nou Estadi Castàlia; Attendance: 0 Referee: Daniel Ocón Arráiz

6 December 2020 17	Zaragoza	1–0	Fuenlabrada	Zaragoza
21:00 CET (UTC+1)	Guitián (yellow card) 15'; Narváez (yellow card) 52', (goal) 60'	Report	Juanma (yellow card) 33'; Nteka (yellow card) 57'	Stadium: La Romareda; Attendance: 0 Referee: Daniel Jesús Trujillo Suárez

9 December 2020 2	Almería	1–0	Zaragoza	Almería
19:00 CET (UTC+1)	Sadiq 59' (yellow card) 70'; Centelles (yellow card) 64'; Buñuel (yellow card) 90+1'	Report	Azón (yellow card) 36'; Chavarría (yellow card) 42'; Francés (yellow card) 77'	Stadium: Juegos Mediterráneos; Attendance: 0 Referee: Aitor Gorostegui Fernández Ortega

13 December 2020 18	Sporting Gijón	1–0	Zaragoza	Gijón
21:00 CET (UTC+1)	Đurđević 77'	Report	Atienza (red card) 67'; Eguaras (yellow card) 81'; Zapater (yellow card) 90+2'	Stadium: El Molinón; Attendance: 0 Referee: Eduardo Prieto Iglesias

19 December 2020 19	Zaragoza	1–0	Lugo	Zaragoza
21:00 CET (UTC+1)	Amador (yellow card) 64'; Chavarría 69' (yellow card) 88'	Report	Torres (yellow card) 12'; Valentín (yellow card) 40'	Stadium: La Romareda; Attendance: 0 Referee: David Gálvez Rascón

2 January 2021 20	Cartagena	1–1	Zaragoza	Cartagena
20:30 CET (UTC+1)	José Ángel (yellow card) 34'; Andújar 60'; Aguza (yellow card) 66'; Carlos David (yellow card) 84'	Report	Vigaray (yellow card) 24'; Azón 81'; Zapater (yellow card) 90'; Igbekeme (yellow card) 90+2'	Stadium: Estadio Cartagonova; Attendance: 0 Referee: Saúl Ais Reig

8 January 2021 21	Zaragoza	2–0	UD Logroñés	Zaragoza
21:00 CET (UTC+1)	Narváez 17' (pen.); Bermejo 54'; Chavarría (yellow card) 70'	Report	Sierra (yellow card) 42'; López (yellow card) 44'; Paulino (yellow card) 62'	Stadium: La Romareda; Attendance: 0 Referee: Luis Mario Milla Alvendiz

22 January 2021 22	Albacete	1–0	Zaragoza	Albacete
21:00 CET (UTC+1)	Azamoum (yellow card) 13'; Fuster 26' (pen.); Arroyo (red card) 82'	Report	Francés (yellow card) 19'; Vigaray (yellow card) 25'; Narváez (yellow card) 40'	Stadium: Estadio Carlos Belmonte; Attendance: 0 Referee: Rubén Ávalos Barrera

29 January 2021 23	Zaragoza	1–0	Ponferradina	Zaragoza
21:00 CET (UTC+1)	Narváez 41' (pen.); Eguaras (yellow card) 45+1'; Alegría (yellow card) 80'	Report	Valcarce (yellow card) 15'	Stadium: La Romareda; Attendance: 0 Referee: Dámaso Arcediano Monescillo

7 February 2021 24	Málaga	1–2	Zaragoza	Málaga
16:00 CET (UTC+1)	González (yellow card) 24'; Muñoz 82'; Casas (yellow card) 90+1'; Sá (yellow card) 90+2'	Report	Igbekeme 11'; Vigaray 45'	Stadium: La Rosaleda; Attendance: 0 Referee: Daniel Jesús Trujillo Suárez

12 February 2021 25	Sabadell	1–1	Zaragoza	Sabadell
21:00 CET (UTC+1)	Grego (yellow card) 57'; Stoichkov 71' (pen.)	Report	Bermejo (yellow card) 27'; Jair 32'; Narváez (penalty missed) 74'	Stadium: Estadi de la Nova Creu Alta; Attendance: 0 Referee: David Gálvez Rascón

22 February 2021 26	Zaragoza	0–1	Alcorcón	Zaragoza
21:00 CET (UTC+1)	Chavarría (yellow card) 88'	Report	Álvarez 65' (o.g.)	Stadium: La Romareda; Attendance: 0 Referee: Javier Iglesias Villanueva

28 February 2021 27	Oviedo	1–0	Zaragoza	Oviedo
21:00 CET (UTC+1)	Grippo (yellow card) 17'; Rodri 53'	Report	Igbekeme (yellow card) 75'; Francés (yellow card) 82'; Fernández (yellow card) 90+1'; Eguaras (yellow card) 90+6'	Stadium: Estadio Carlos Tartiere; Attendance: 0 Referee: Óliver de la Fuente Ramos

6 March 2021 28	Zaragoza	1–0	Tenerife	Zaragoza
16:00 CET (UTC+1)	Alegría 21'	Report	Vada (yellow card) 50'; Nono (yellow card) 74'; Alonso (yellow card) 76'; Pomares (yellow card) 78'; Ruiz (yellow card) 87'	Stadium: La Romareda; Attendance: 0 Referee: Álvaro Moreno Aragón

12 March 2021 29	Rayo Vallecano	3–2	Zaragoza	Madrid
21:00 CET (UTC+1)	Catena (yellow card) 37', (goal) 49'; Bebé 41'; Trejo (yellow card) 56'; F. García (yellow card) 61'; Á. García 70'; Hernández (yellow card) 87'	Report	Narváez 11', (yellow card) 82'; Á. García 29' (o.g.); Nieto (yellow card) 64'; Francés (yellow card) 90'	Stadium: Vallecas; Attendance: 0 Referee: Luis Mario Milla Alvendiz

22 March 2021 30	Zaragoza	1–0	Mirandés	Zaragoza
21:00 CET (UTC+1)	Peybernes 6'; Alegría (penalty missed) 78'; Jair (yellow card) 83'	Report	Jiménez (yellow card) 71'; Gómez (yellow card) 78'; Lizoain (yellow card) 84'	Stadium: La Romareda; Attendance: 0 Referee: Daniel Jesús Trujillo Suárez

27 March 2021 31	UD Logroñés	1–1	Zaragoza	Logroño
21:00 CET (UTC+1)	Andy 15' (pen.), (yellow card) 75'; Petcoff (yellow card) 85'	Report	Jair (yellow card) 14'; Narváez 62'	Stadium: Las Gaunas; Attendance: 0 Referee: Jon Ander González Esteban

1 April 2021 32	Zaragoza	0–0	Cartagena	Zaragoza
21:30 CEST (UTC+2)	Narváez (yellow card) 53'; Peybernes (yellow card) 74'	Report	Andújar (yellow card) 46'; Cayarga (yellow card) 75'	Stadium: La Romareda; Attendance: 0 Referee: Juan Luis Pulido Santana

5 April 2021 33	Fuenlabrada	0–1	Zaragoza	Fuenlabrada
21:00 CEST (UTC+2)	Salvador (penalty missed) 20'; Juanma (yellow card) 45+1'; Jano (yellow card) 49'	Report	Jair (yellow card) 19'; Tejero 86' (pen.)	Stadium: Fernando Torres; Attendance: 0 Referee: Saúl Ais Reig

11 April 2021 34	Zaragoza	2–1	Almería	Zaragoza
16:00 CEST (UTC+2)	Adrián 10'; Nieto (yellow card) 18'; Azón 80'; Chavarría (yellow card) 84'	Report	Costa (yellow card) 17'; Robertone (yellow card) 32', (goal) 34'; Balliu (yellow card) 57'; Petrović (yellow card) 59'; Corpas (yellow card) 84' (yellow-red card) 90+4'	Stadium: La Romareda; Attendance: 0 Referee: Miguel Ángel Ortiz Arias

16 April 2021 35	Girona	3–0	Zaragoza	Girona
21:00 CEST (UTC+2)	Stuani 6' (pen.); Aday (yellow card) 53'; Bueno (yellow card) 57'; Bustos 65'; Gumbau (yellow card) 67'; Luna (yellow card) 78'; Sylla 84'	Report	Fernández (yellow card) 18'; Tejero (yellow card) 60'	Stadium: Montilivi; Attendance: 0 Referee: José Antonio López Toca

23 April 2021 36	Zaragoza	0–0	Sporting Gijón	Zaragoza
21:00 CEST (UTC+2)	Nieto (yellow card) 42'; Eguaras (yellow card) 90'	Report	Rosas (yellow card) 30'; García (yellow card) 64'	Stadium: La Romareda; Attendance: 0 Referee: Eduardo Prieto Iglesias

30 April 2021 37	Lugo	2–2	Zaragoza	Lugo
21:00 CEST (UTC+2)	Barreiro 44'; Varo (yellow card) 62'; Venâncio 81'; Juanpe (yellow card) 90+6'	Report	Adrián 64' (pen.); Peybernes (yellow card) 68'; Azón (yellow card) 78'; Álvarez 90+7'	Stadium: Anxo Carro; Attendance: 0 Referee: Dámaso Arcediano Monescillo

8 May 2021 38	Zaragoza	0–0	Espanyol	Zaragoza
18:15 CEST (UTC+2)	Bermejo (yellow card) 41'; Zapater (yellow card) 57'	Report	Dimata (yellow card) 45+3'	Stadium: La Romareda; Attendance: 0 Referee: Juan Luis Pulido Santana

15 May 2021 39	Las Palmas	0–2	Zaragoza	Las Palmas
21:00 CEST (UTC+2)	Lemos (yellow card) 63'	Report	Zanimacchia 8' (pen.); Eguaras (yellow card) 22', (penalty missed) 25'; Vigaray (yellow card) 45'; Sanabria 81'; Jair (yellow card) 90+3'	Stadium: Estadio Gran Canaria; Attendance: 0 Referee: David Gálvez Rascón

20 May 2021 40	Zaragoza	3–0	Castellón	Zaragoza
21:30 CEST (UTC+2)	Serrano 13'; Azón 47'; Tejero 66' (pen.)	Report	Molina (yellow card) 53'; Cubillas (yellow card) 70'	Stadium: La Romareda; Attendance: 0 Referee: Daniel Ocón Arráiz

23 May 2021 41	Mallorca	2–1	Zaragoza	Palma
18:15 CEST (UTC+2)	Rodríguez (yellow card) 22', (goal) 68'; Sevilla (yellow card) 58'; Junior 89'	Report	Zanimacchia 23' (pen.); Sanabria (yellow card) 32'; Serrano (yellow card) 34'	Stadium: Visit Mallorca Stadium; Attendance: 0 Referee: David Gálvez Rascón

30 May 2021 42	Zaragoza	0–5	Leganés	Zaragoza
21:00 CEST (UTC+2)	Zapater (yellow card) 18'; Narváez (yellow card) 19'; Chavarría (yellow card) 32'; Serrano (yellow card) 34'	Report	Bua 15'; Muñoz 29', 43'; Pardo 48'; Miguel 55'	Stadium: La Romareda; Attendance: 0 Referee: Gorka Sagués Oscoz

=== Copa del Rey ===
16 December 2020 First round	Gimnástica Torrelavega	0–2 (a.e.t.)	Zaragoza	Torrelavega
19:00 CET (UTC+1)		Report	Azón 100'; Serrano 106'	Stadium: El Malecón; Referee: Gorka Sagués Oscoz

5 January 2021 Second round	Alcorcón	2–1	Zaragoza	Alcorcón
21:00 CET (UTC+1)	Bellvís (yellow card) 15'; Ernesto 42'; León 89'	Report	Raí 4'; Tarroc (yellow card) 88'	Stadium: Santo Domingo; Referee: Rubén Ávalos Barrera
