= 2017–18 Real Zaragoza season =

Real Zaragoza
2017–18 season
- Chairman: Christian Lapetra
- Manager: Natxo González
- Stadium: La Romareda
- Segunda División: 3rd
- Copa del Rey: Round of 32
Home colours

The 2017–18 season is the 86th season in Real Zaragoza ’s history.

== Squad ==
As of 2 September 2017

Note: Flags indicate national team as defined under FIFA eligibility rules; some limited exceptions apply. Players may hold more than one non-FIFA nationality.

No.	Pos.	Nation	Player
1	GK	ARG	Cristian Álvarez
2	DF	ESP	Alberto Benito
3	DF	ESP	Ángel Martínez
4	DF	ESP	Jesús Valentín
5	DF	POR	Diogo Verdasca
6	DF	SUI	Simone Grippo
7	FW	BRA	Vinícius Araújo
8	MF	ESP	Jorge Pombo
9	FW	ESP	Borja Iglesias (on loan from Celta)
10	MF	ESP	Javi Ros
11	MF	ESP	Alain Oyarzun
13	GK	ESP	Álvaro Ratón

No.	Pos.	Nation	Player
14	MF	ESP	Aleix Febas (on loan from Real Madrid)
15	MF	SUI	Oliver Buff
16	MF	ESP	Íñigo Eguaras
17	DF	ESP	Daniel Lasure
19	MF	GEO	Giorgi Papunashvili
21	MF	ESP	Alberto Zapater (captain)
22	DF	ESP	Julián Delmás
23	FW	ESP	Gaizka Toquero
24	DF	ESP	Mikel González
28	FW	BRA	Raí Nascimento
29	DF	ESP	Álex Zalaya

== Competitions ==
=== Overall ===
Competition	Final position
Segunda División	-
Copa del Rey	-

=== Liga ===
==== League table ====
Pos	Team	Pld	W	D	L	GF	GA	GD	Pts	Promotion, qualification or relegation
1	Rayo Vallecano (C, P)	42	21	13	8	67	48	+19	76	Promotion to La Liga
2	Huesca (P)	42	21	12	9	61	40	+21	75	Promotion to La Liga
3	Zaragoza	42	20	11	11	57	44	+13	71 (Note: Zaragoza finished ahead of Sporting Gijón on head-to-head points: Sporting Gijón 0–1 Zaragoza, Zaragoza 2–1 Sporting Gijón)	Qualification for promotion play-offs
4	Sporting Gijón	42	21	8	13	60	40	+20	71	Qualification for promotion play-offs
5	Valladolid (O, P)	42	19	10	13	69	55	+14	67	Qualification for promotion play-offs

Source: La Liga
Rules for classification: 1) points; 2) head-to-head points; 3) head-to-head goal difference; 4) goal difference; 5) number of goals scored
(C) Champions; (O) Play-off winners; (P) Promoted

==== Matches ====
18 August 2017 Match 1	Tenerife	1 - 0	Real Zaragoza	Santa Cruz de Tenerife
21:00	Carlos Ruiz 56'	Report	Delmás (yellow card) 30'; Alberto Zapater (yellow card) 45+1'; Javier Ros (yellow card) 81'	Stadium: Estadio Heliodoro Rodríguez López; Attendance: 10,287; Referee: (Spain) Dámaso Arcediano

27 August 2017 Match 2	Real Zaragoza	1 - 1	Granada	Zaragoza
19:00	Jesús Valentín (yellow card) 23'; Íñigo Eguaras (yellow card) 36'; Jorge Pombo (yellow card) 68'; Borja Iglesias 71' (pen.)	Report	Pedro 24'; Raúl Baena (yellow card) 43' (yellow-red card); Germán Sánchez Barahona (yellow card) 70'	Stadium: La Romareda; Attendance: 13,899; Referee: (Spain) Iñaki Bikandi

3 September 2017 Match 3	Córdoba	1 - 2	Real Zaragoza	Córdoba
21:30	Mejía 22'; Edu Ramos (yellow card) 54'; Sergi Guardiola (yellow card) 88'	Report	Javier Ros (yellow card) 5'; Borja Iglesias 19' 69'; Alberto Zapater (yellow card) 23' (yellow-red card); Grippo (yellow card) 77'	Stadium: Estadio Nuevo Arcángel; Attendance: 11,216; Referee: (Spain) Álvaro Moreno

10 September 2017 Match 4	Real Zaragoza	0 - 1	Alcorcón	Zaragoza
16:00	Toquero (yellow card) 31'; Buff (yellow card) 61'; Diogo Verdasca (yellow card) 67'	Report	Burgos (yellow card) 24'; David Navarro (yellow card) 29'; Peña 38'; Borja Domínguez (yellow card) 50'; Jon Errasti (yellow card) 54'; Casto (yellow card) 90+1'; Álvaro Giménez (yellow card) 90+5'	Stadium: La Romareda; Attendance: 17,905; Referee: (Spain) David Pérez

15 September 2017 Match 5	Lugo	2 - 1	Real Zaragoza	Lugo
21:00	Fede Vico (yellow card) 58'; Fernando Seoane 67'; Iriome 90+2'	Report	Buff 38'; Borja Iglesias (yellow card) 52'; Ángel Martínez (yellow card) 63'	Stadium: Estadio Anxo Carro; Attendance: 3,242; Referee: (Spain) Saúl Ais

24 September 2017 Match 6	Real Zaragoza	1 - 1	Gimnàstic de Tarragona	Zaragoza
20:30	Toquero 19'; Íñigo Eguaras (yellow card) 26'; Borja Iglesias (yellow card) 33' (yellow-red card); Aleix Febas (yellow card) 36'; Álvarez (yellow card) 60'	Report	Xavi Molina (yellow card) 8'; Abraham (yellow card) 26'; Jon Gaztañaga (yellow card) 56'; Kakabadze (yellow card) 71'; Javi Jiménez (yellow card) 76'; Maikel Mesa 87' (yellow card) 87'; Juan Muñiz (yellow card) 90+3'	Stadium: La Romareda; Attendance: 17,026; Referee: (Spain) Jorge Figueroa

2 October 2017 Match 7	Real Oviedo	2 - 2	Real Zaragoza	Oviedo
21:00	Aarón Ñíguez 5'; Christian Fernández (yellow card) 27'; Toché 28'; Forlín (yellow card) 63'; David Rocha (yellow card) 81'	Report	Diogo Verdasca (yellow card) 11'; Mikel González 31'; Alberto Zapater 39'	Stadium: Estadio Carlos Tartiere; Attendance: 11,279; Referee: (Spain) Juan Pulido

8 October 2017 Match 8	Real Zaragoza	3 - 0	Numancia	Zaragoza
20:30	Toquero 2' 48'; Alain Oyarzun (yellow card) 8'; Mikel González (yellow card) 34'; Borja Iglesias 56' (pen.)	Report	Unai Medina (yellow card) 17'; Alberto Escassi (yellow card) 36'; Dani Calvo (yellow card) 52'; Diamanka (red card) 55'	Stadium: La Romareda; Attendance: 18,487; Referee: (Spain) Valentín Pizarro

11 October 2017 Match 9	Lorca	0 - 2	Real Zaragoza	Lorca
21:00	Fran Cruz (yellow card) 7'; Bustos (yellow card) 84'	Report	Javier Ros 49' (yellow card) 74'; Alberto Zapater (yellow card) 57'; Papunashvili 81'	Stadium: Estadio Francisco Artés Carrasco; Attendance: 6,236; Referee: (Spain) Aitor Gorostegui

15 October 2017 Match 10	Real Zaragoza	1 - 1	Osasuna	Zaragoza
20:30	Mikel González (yellow card) 4'; Borja Iglesias 43' (pen.); Toquero (yellow card) 80'; Jorge Pombo (red card) 90'	Report	Lillo (yellow card) 26'; Oier (yellow card) 45' (goal) 72'; García (yellow card) 90+3'	Stadium: La Romareda; Attendance: 22,679; Referee: (Spain) Isidro Díaz de Mera

21 October 2017 Match 11	Sevilla Atlético	2 - 2	Real Zaragoza	Seville
20:30	Carlos Fernández 19' (yellow card) 22' (goal) 47'; Borja (yellow card) 52'; Álex Muñoz (yellow card) 68'; Juan Berrocal (yellow card) 90+2'	Report	Diogo Verdasca (yellow card) 32'; Borja Iglesias 41' 78'; Delmás (yellow card) 44'; Buff (yellow card) 50'	Stadium: Estadio Viejo Nervión; Attendance: 1,345; Referee: (Spain) Adrián Cordero

27 October 2017 Match 12	Real Zaragoza	0 - 0	Cultural y Deportiva Leonesa	Zaragoza
20:00	Alain Oyarzun (yellow card) 77'	Report	Yeray (yellow card) 53'; Josep Señé (yellow card) 83'	Stadium: La Romareda; Attendance: 17,001; Referee: (Spain) Saúl Ais

6 November 2017 Match 13	Huesca	3 - 1	Real Zaragoza	Huesca
21:00	Gonzalo Melero 16'; Aguilera (yellow card) 43'; Hernández 63' 85'; Lluís Sastre (yellow card) 77'	Report	Borja Iglesias (yellow card) 46'; Alberto Zapater (yellow card) 55' (goal) 84'; Diogo Verdasca (yellow card) 90'	Stadium: Estadio El Alcoraz; Attendance: 4,805; Referee: (Spain) Oliver De La Fuente

11 November 2017 Match 14	Real Zaragoza	3 - 2	Rayo Vallecano	Zaragoza
18:00	Grippo 26'; Diogo Verdasca (yellow card) 39'; Aleix Febas 42'; Jorge Pombo 78'	Report	Ba (yellow card) 48'; Raúl de Tomás 53' (yellow card) 60'; Trejo 73'; Santi Comesaña (yellow card) 88'; Diego Aguirre (yellow card) 90+1'	Stadium: La Romareda; Attendance: 17,729; Referee: (Spain) Victor Areces

17 November 2017 Match 15	Almería	3 - 0	Real Zaragoza	Almería
21:00	Fran 43'; Jorge Morcillo (yellow card) 68'; Owona (yellow card) 75'; Rubén Alcaraz 80' 90+3'	Report	Grippo (yellow card) 46'; Julián Delmás (yellow card) 59'	Stadium: Estadio de los Juegos Mediterráneos; Attendance: 5,260; Referee: (Spain) Daniel Ocón

25 November 2017 Match 16	Real Zaragoza	0 - 0	Reus	Zaragoza
20:30	Borja Iglesias (yellow card) 31'	Report	Pichu Atienza (yellow card) 33'; Álex Carbonell (yellow card) 61'; Tito (yellow card) 89'	Stadium: La Romareda; Attendance: 15,041; Referee: (Spain) Dámaso Arcediano

3 December 2017 Match 17	Sporting de Gijón	0 - 1	Real Zaragoza	Gijón
20:30	Aït-Atmane (yellow card) 28'; Jordi Calavera (yellow card) 90+3'	Report	Delmás 68' (yellow card) 75'; Diogo Verdasca (yellow card) 85'	Stadium: El Molinón; Attendance: 15,436; Referee: (Spain) José López

9 December 2017 Match 18	Real Zaragoza	0 - 2	Cádiz	Zaragoza
20:30	Papunashvili (yellow card) 6'; Alberto Zapater (yellow card) 26'; Diogo Verdasca (yellow card) 28' (red card) 28'; Vinícius Araújo (yellow card) 31'; Álvarez (red card) 68'	Report	Bijker (yellow card) 37'; Álvaro García 52'; Jon Ander Garrido (yellow card) 58'; Dani Romera 90'	Stadium: La Romareda; Attendance: 14,999; Referee: (Spain) Adrián Cordero

16 December 2017 Match 19	Albacete	0 - 0	Real Zaragoza	Albacete
20:30	Dani Rodríguez (yellow card) 53'	Report	Jorge Pombo (yellow card) 67'; Grippo (yellow card) 75'	Stadium: Estadio Carlos Belmonte; Attendance: 4,550; Referee: (Spain) Rubén Eiriz

19 December 2017 Match 20	Real Valladolid	3 - 2	Real Zaragoza	Valladolid
21:00	Anuar 4'; Mikel González 6' (o.g.); Jaime Mata 38' (yellow card) 90+4'	Report	Papunashvili (yellow card) 35'; Borja Iglesias 40' 79' (pen.); Raúl Guti (yellow card) 81'; Aleix Febas (yellow card) 87'	Stadium: Estadio José Zorrilla; Attendance: 5,559; Referee: (Spain) Iñaki Bikandi

6 January 2018 Match 21	Real Zaragoza	1 - 1	Barcelona B	Zaragoza
20:30	Javier Ros (yellow card) 61'; Raúl Guti 65'; Jorge Pombo (yellow card) 73'; Íñigo Eguaras (yellow card) 89'	Report	Carles Aleñá (yellow card) 10'; Abel Ruiz 55'	Stadium: La Romareda; Attendance: 10,177; Referee: (Spain) Eduardo Prieto

13 January 2018 Match 22	Real Zaragoza	1 - 0	Tenerife	Zaragoza
20:30	Jorge Pombo 6'; Borja Iglesias (yellow card) 83'; Raúl Guti (yellow card) 85'	Report	Camille (yellow card) 13'	Stadium: La Romareda; Attendance: 12,337; Referee: (Spain) Guillermo Cuadra Fernández

19 January 2018 Match 23	Granada	2 - 1	Real Zaragoza	Granada
21:00	Ramos 16'; Álex Martínez 39'; Alberto (yellow card) 53'	Report	Grippo 12' (yellow card) 85'; Íñigo Eguaras (yellow card) 49'; Daniel Lasure (yellow card) 55'; Papunashvili (yellow card) 73'	Stadium: Los Cármenes; Attendance: 10,579; Referee: (Spain) Dámaso Arcediano

26 January 2018 Match 24	Real Zaragoza	1-0	Córdoba	Zaragoza
21:00	Jorge Pombo 19'; Diogo Verdasca (yellow card) 41'	Summary	Fernández (yellow card) 26'; João Afonso (yellow card) 36'	Stadium: La Romareda; Attendance: 12,527; Referee: (Spain) Gorka Sagues

3 February 2018 Match 25	Alcorcón	1-1	Real Zaragoza	Alcorcón
18:00	Jonathan Pereira 32'	Summary	Alberto Zapater 4' (yellow card) 79'; Bruno Perone (yellow card) 19'; Diogo Verdasca (yellow card) 85'; Alain Oyarzun (yellow card) 90'	Stadium: Santo Domingo; Attendance: 3,036; Referee: (Spain) Víctor Areces

11 February 2018 Match 26	Real Zaragoza	2-0	Lugo	Zaragoza
20:30	Borja Iglesias 14'; Javi Ros (yellow card) 69'; Buff 83'	Summary	Chuli (yellow card) 31'; Iriome (yellow card) 76'; Fernando Seoane (yellow card) 82'; Bernardo (yellow card) 90+3'	Stadium: La Romareda; Attendance: 12,580; Referee: (Spain) Oliver De La Fuente

17 February 2018 Match 27	Gimnàstic de Tarragona	0-2	Real Zaragoza	Tarragona
20:30	Javi Márquez (yellow card) 64'	Summary	Alberto Zapater (yellow card) 33'; Grippo 41'; Álvarez (yellow card) 45+3'; Jorge Pombo (yellow card) 51'; Borja Iglesias 60'; Vinícius Araújo (yellow card) 86'; Alberto Benito (yellow card) 90'	Stadium: Nou Estadi de Tarragona; Attendance: 5,617; Referee: (Spain) David Pérez

25 February 2018 Match 28	Real Zaragoza	2-1	Real Oviedo	Zaragoza
16:00	Borja Iglesias 69'; Forlín 73' (o.g.); Buff (yellow card) 76'	Summary	Saúl Berjón (yellow card) 57' (yellow-red card); Carlos Hernández 90'; Toché (yellow card) 90+1'	Stadium: La Romareda; Attendance: 20,696; Referee: (Spain) Iñaki Bikandi

3 March 2018 Match 29	Numancia	v	Real Zaragoza	Soria
				Stadium: Nuevo Estadio Los Pajaritos

=== Copa del Rey ===
6 September 2017 Round 2	Real Zaragoza	3 - 0	Granada	Zaragoza
22:00	Íñigo Eguaras (yellow card) 51'; Borja Iglesias 59' (pen.); Alberto Benito 66'; Jorge Pombo 86' (pen.)	Report	Manaj (yellow card) 46'; Hongla (yellow card) 74'; Urtzi Iriondo (yellow card) 85'	Stadium: La Romareda; Attendance: 10,221; Referee: (Spain) Rubén Eiriz

21 September 2017 Round 3	Real Zaragoza	1 - 0	Lugo	Zaragoza
21:00	Papunashvili 22' (yellow card) 63'; Alain Oyarzun (yellow card) 86'	Report	Josete (yellow card) 17'; Kravets (yellow card) 41'	Stadium: La Romareda; Attendance: 11,955; Referee: (Spain) Adrián Cordero

24 October 2017 Last 32 First Leg	Real Zaragoza	0 - 2	Valencia	Zaragoza
20:30	Delmás (yellow card) 90+1'	Report	Rúben Vezo (yellow card) 40'; Nacho Vidal (yellow card) 65'; Rodrigo 81'; Dani Parejo 90+1' (pen.)	Stadium: La Romareda; Attendance: 16,174; Referee: (Spain) David Medié

30 November 2017 Last 32 Second Leg	Valencia	4 - 1 (6 - 1 agg.)	Real Zaragoza	Valencia
21:30	Santi Mina 28' 59'; Andreas Pereira (yellow card) 62'; Robert Ibáñez 68'; Rúben Vezo 86'	Report	Jorge Pombo 87'	Stadium: Mestalla Stadium; Attendance: 26,311; Referee: (Spain) Mario Melero
