= Anglada (surname) =

Anglada is a Catalan-language toponymic surname. It can also be rendered s'Anglada, Zanglada, and Inglada.

Although anglada can also be Catalan for "meander", the surname independently comes from the Latin angulata, "corner", which would refer to specific parcels of land. It can also be a transposition of the Latin surname de Angularia, although a derised one.

Notable people with it include:

- Félix Anglada (born 1945), Catalan sailor
- Francisco Martínez Anglada (born 1995), Spanish footballer
- Guillem Anglada-Escudé (born 1979), Spanish astronomer
- Héctor Anglada (1976–2002), Argentine actor
- Hermenegildo Anglada Camarasa (1871–1959), Catalan painter
- Hugo Anglada (born 2005), Spanish footballer
- Josep Anglada (born 1959), Catalan politician
- Joseph Anglada (1755–1833), French-Catalan chemist
- Lola Anglada (1893–1984), Catalan writer
- Luis López Anglada (1919–2007), Spanish writer
- Maria Àngels Anglada (1930–1999), Catalan poet and novelist
- Pol Anglada (born 1991), Spanish illustrator
- Ramon Anglada, Spanish musician
- Rey Vicente Anglada (born 1953), Cuban baseball player and manager
- Xiscu Martínez Anglada (born 1995), Spanish footballer

== See also ==
- Anglade (surname), a French surname
- People with surname Inglada:
  - José Aparicio
  - Alexandre de Riquer
  - Maria Muntañola Cvetković
  - Modest Urgell
