= Antonio Sola =

Spanish footballer

Personal information
- Full name: Antonio Sola Villalba
- Date of birth: 24 January 2001 (age 25)
- Place of birth: Utrillas, Spain
- Position: Left-back

Team information
- Current team: Bergantiños
- Number: 3

Youth career
- Utrillas
- Giner Torrero
- Zaragoza
- 2015–2020: Barcelona

Senior career*
Years	Team	Apps	(Gls)
2020–2024	Zaragoza B	68	(5)
2020	Zaragoza	1	(0)
2024–2025	Ejea	28	(0)
2025–	Bergantiños	33	(0)
- * Club domestic league appearances and goals as of 14 May 2026

Antonio Sola Villalba (born 24 January 2001) is a Spanish footballer who plays for Bergantiños FC as a left-back.

== Club career ==
Born in Utrillas, Teruel, Aragon, Sola joined FC Barcelona's La Masia in 2015, after representing Real Zaragoza, CD Giner Torrero and CD Utrillas. On 27 July 2020, after finishing his formation, he returned to Zaragoza on a two-year contract, being assigned to the reserves in Tercera División.

Sola made his senior debut on 18 October 2020, starting in a 1–1 Tercera División away draw against CF Illueca. He scored his first goal on 15 November, netting the winner in a 2–1 home success over UD Fraga.

Sola made his first team debut on 22 November 2020, coming on 59th-minute substitute for Sergio Bermejo and scoring an equalizing own goal the following minute of a 1–2 away loss against SD Ponferradina.

== Career statistics ==
=== Club ===
As of 27 August 2024

Appearances and goals by club, season and competition
Club	Season	League			Cup		Europe		Other		Total	
Club	Season	Division	Apps	Goals	Apps	Goals	Apps	Goals	Apps	Goals	Apps	Goals
Real Zaragoza	2020–21	Segunda División	1	0	1	0	—		—		2	0
Zaragoza B	2020–21	Tercera División	17	1	—		—		—		17	1
Zaragoza B	2021–22	Tercera División RFEF	32	3	—		—		—		32	3
Zaragoza B	2022–23	Segunda Federación	1	0	—		—		—		1	0
Zaragoza B	2023–24	Segunda Federación	18	1	—		—		1 (Note: Appearances in Segunda Federación promotion play-offs)	0	19	1
Zaragoza B	Total		68	5	0	0	0	0	0	0	69	5
Career total			69	5	1	0	0	0	1	0	71	5

== Personal life ==
Sola's twin brother Raúl is also a footballer. A right-back, who plays for Atlético Sanluqueño CF.
