= Raí Nascimento =

Brazilian footballer (born 1998)

Personal information
- Full name: Raí Nascimento de Oliveira
- Date of birth: 18 May 1998 (age 28)
- Place of birth: Rio de Janeiro, Brazil
- Height: 1.72 m (5 ft 8 in)
- Position: Forward

Team information
- Current team: Londrina
- Number: 28

Youth career
- 2012–2013: Stadium Casablanca
- 2013–2014: Stadium Venecia
- 2016–2017: Zaragoza

Senior career*
Years	Team	Apps	(Gls)
2014–2016	Alfindén	34	(24)
2016–2018	Zaragoza B	21	(2)
2017–2021	Zaragoza	8	(0)
2019–2020	→ Ibiza (loan)	36	(5)
2021	Deportivo La Coruña	13	(0)
2021–2023	Bahia	34	(4)
2023–2024	Ludogorets Razgrad II	11	(5)
2023–2024	Ludogorets Razgrad	10	(0)
2025	Guarani	5	(0)
2025–2026	São João de Ver	16	(4)
2026–	Londrina	6	(0)
- * Club domestic league appearances and goals as of 20 September 2026

Raí Nascimento de Oliveira (born 18 May 1998), sometimes known simply as Raí, is a Brazilian professional footballer who plays as a forward for Série B club Londrina.

== Career ==
=== Early career ===
Born in Rio de Janeiro, Raí Nascimento moved to Spain at the age of 14 and joined Stadium Casablanca's youth setup. In 2014, after representing Stadium Venecia, he moved to AD Alfindén in the regional leagues.

Raí made his senior debut on 21 December 2014, aged just 16, by starting in a 2–2 Primera Regional away draw against El Gancho CF. His first goal came on the following 18 January, the last in a 2–0 win at CD Perdiguera; he finished the season with eleven goals in just 15 appearances.

=== Zaragoza ===
In August 2016, Raí joined Real Zaragoza, but could not play until January due to the lack of international clearance. Initially assigned to the youth teams, he made his debut for the B-team on 8 January 2017 starting and scoring in a 2–4 Tercera División away loss against CD Belchite 97. He also scored in his second appearance late in the month, netting the fifth in a 5–0 home routing of AD Sabiñánigo.

Raí made his first team debut on 19 March 2017, coming on as a second-half substitute for Rolf Feltscher in a 1–2 home loss against Sevilla Atlético in the Segunda División. On 27 April he extended his contract until 2021, and was definitely promoted to the main squad on 6 June.

On 29 January 2019, Raí was loaned to Segunda División B side UD Ibiza until the end of the season. On 11 July, his loan was renewed for a further year.

After returning from loan, Raí was assigned to the main squad, and renewed his contract until 2023 on 28 September 2020. The following 25 January, however, he terminated his contract after appearing rarely.

=== Deportivo La Coruña ===
On 27 January 2021, Raí agreed to a short-term deal with Deportivo de La Coruña in the third division.

=== Bahia ===
On 23 September 2021, Raí returned to his home country after signing for Série A side Bahia until June 2022.

=== Ludogorets Razgrad ===
On 7 February 2023, Raí signed a contract with Ludogorets Razgrad.

== Career statistics ==
As of 20 July 2023

Appearances and goals by club, season and competition
Club	Season	League			State League		National cup		Continental		Other		Total	
Club	Season	Division	Apps	Goals	Apps	Goals	Apps	Goals	Apps	Goals	Apps	Goals	Apps	Goals
Alfindén	2014–15	Primera Regional	15	11	—		—		—		—		15	11
Alfindén	2015–16	Primera Regional	19	13	—		—		—		—		19	13
Alfindén	Total		34	24	—		—		—		—		34	24
Zaragoza B	2016–17	Tercera División	4	4	—		—		—		2 (Note: Appearance(s) in promotion playoffs)	0	6	4
Zaragoza B	2017–18	Segunda División B	21	2	—		—		—		—		21	2
Zaragoza B	Total		25	6	—		—		—		2	0	27	6
Zaragoza	2016–17	Segunda División	2	0	—		0	0	—		—		2	0
Zaragoza	2017–18	Segunda División	0	0	—		2	0	—		—		2	0
Zaragoza	2018–19	Segunda División	1	0	—		1	0	—		—		2	0
Zaragoza	2020–21	Segunda División	5	0	—		2	1	—		—		7	1
Zaragoza	Total		8	0	—		5	1	—		—		13	1
Ibiza (loan)	2018–19	Segunda División B	12	1	—		—		—		—		12	1
Ibiza (loan)	2019–20	Segunda División B	23	4	—		0	0	—		1	0	24	4
Ibiza (loan)	Total		35	5	—		0	0	—		1	0	36	5
Deportivo La Coruña	2020–21	Segunda División B	13	0	—		0	0	—		—		13	0
Bahia	2021	Série A	15	3	8	3	—		—		—		23	6
Bahia	2022	Série B	19	1	8	1	3	0	—		—		30	2
Bahia	Total		34	4	16	4	3	0	—		0	0	53	8
Ludogorets Razgrad	2022–23	Bulgarian First League	7	0	—		4	0	—		—		11	0
Career total			156	37	16	4	12	1	0	0	3	0	187	42
