= Muntañola =

Muntañola can be both a middle name and a surname. Notable people with the name include:

- Maria Muntañola Cvetković (1923–2021), Spanish-Serbian mycologist
- Juan Ignacio Muntañola (fl. 1970s), Spanish former tennis player
