= 2016–17 Real Zaragoza season =

Real Zaragoza
2016–17 season
- Chairman: Christian Lapetra
- Manager: Luis Milla (1-11); Raúl Agné (12-30); César Láinez (31-42)
- Stadium: La Romareda
- Segunda División: 16th
Home colours	Away colours	Third colours

The 2016–17 season was the 85th season in Real Zaragoza's history and the 20th in the Spanish second tier.

== Squad ==
As of 4 February 2017

Note: Flags indicate national team as defined under FIFA eligibility rules; some limited exceptions apply. Players may hold more than one non-FIFA nationality.

No.	Pos.	Nation	Player
1	GK	ESP	Xabi Irureta
2	DF	ESP	Fran Rodríguez
3	DF	ESP	Jorge Casado
4	DF	URU	Leandro Cabrera (3rd captain)
5	FW	GRE	Georgios Samaras
6	MF	POL	Cezary Wilk
7	FW	CMR	Jean Marie Dongou
8	MF	ESP	Cani (2nd captain)
9	FW	ESP	Ángel (4th captain)
10	MF	ESP	Javi Ros
11	MF	ESP	Edu García
12	MF	ESP	Manuel Lanzarote
13	GK	ARG	Sebastián Saja

No.	Pos.	Nation	Player
14	DF	URU	Marcelo Silva
15	DF	CMR	Frank Bagnack
16	DF	ESP	Isaac Carcelén
17	MF	ESP	Jordi Xumetra
19	DF	ESP	José Enrique
20	MF	ESP	Álex Barrera
21	MF	ESP	Alberto Zapater (captain)
22	DF	ESP	Jesús Valentín
23	DF	VEN	Rolf Feltscher (on loan from Getafe)
24	MF	ESP	Edu Bedia
26	MF	ESP	Jorge Pombo
30	GK	ESP	Álvaro Ratón
37	MF	ESP	Xiscu Martínez

== Competitions ==
=== Overall ===
Competition	Final position
Segunda División	16th
Copa del Rey	2nd round

=== Liga ===
==== League table ====
Pos	Team	Pld	W	D	L	GF	GA	GD	Pts
14	Gimnàstic	42	12	16	14	47	51	−4	52
15	Almería	42	14	9	19	44	49	−5	51
16	Zaragoza	42	12	14	16	50	52	−2	50 (Note: Zaragoza and Numancia finished ahead of Alcorcón on head-to-head points: Zaragoza 7 pts, Numancia 7 pts, Alcorcón 2 pts. Zaragoza finished ahead of Numancia on head-to-head goal difference: Numancia 2–1 Zaragoza, Zaragoza 3–0 Numancia)
17	Numancia	42	11	17	14	40	49	−9	50
18	Alcorcón	42	13	11	18	32	43	−11	50

Source: La Liga
Rules for classification: 1) points; 2) head-to-head points; 3) head-to-head goal difference; 4) goal difference; 5) number of goals scored
