= Maria Muntañola Cvetković =

Spanish mycologist (1923–2021)

- Born: Maria Muntañola i Inglada; 26 August 1923; Gràcia, Barcelona, Catalonia, Spain
- Died: 7 January 2011 (aged 87); Belgrade, Serbia
- Occupation: Mycologist
- Spouses: Francisco de Asis Monrós (d. 1958); Slobodan Cvetković (m. 1960)
- Children: 2
- Awards: Guggenheim Fellowship (1952)

Academic background
- Education: University of Buenos Aires; Sorbonne University
- Doctoral advisor: Georges Viennot-Bourgein

Academic work
- Discipline: Mycology
- Institutions: University of Belgrade; University of Novi Sad

Maria Muntañola Cvetković (née Muntañola i Inglada; 26 August 1923 – 7 January 2011) was a Spanish mycologist based in Serbia. After fleeing to Argentina due to the Spanish Civil War, she obtained her degrees from the University of Buenos Aires and Sorbonne University and moved to Belgrade, where she worked as a professor at the University of Novi Sad and became a full professor at the University of Belgrade. A 1952 Guggenheim Fellow, she became one of Serbia's first microfungi experts, described eight species of ascomycetes and was the first president of the Mycological Society of Serbia.

== Biography ==
=== Early life and career ===
Maria Muntañola i Inglada was born on 26 August 1923 in Gràcia, a district in northwestern Barcelona. Her parents were Montserrat (née Inglada) and Francesc Muntañola i Puig, who owned a timber warehouse and was mayor of L'Ametlla del Vallès for two months in 1939. The family fled Spain to Argentina in 1939 due to poor living conditions during the Spanish Civil War. She graduated from a high school in Buenos Aires and obtained her agronomist-engineer degree from the University of Buenos Aires Faculty of Agronomy and Veterinary Sciences.

Becoming interested in mycology due to her interest in plants, she toured northern South America, Panama, and Cuba for her first research project, focusing on phytopathogenic fungi, and she became a teacher at the Instituto Miguel Lillo in the National University of Tucumán (UNT). She was awarded a Guggenheim Fellowship in 1952. Following an early career in Argentina, she later moved to Paris, where she obtained her PhD in 1958 at Sorbonne University; her dissertation was supervised by Georges Viennot-Bourgein.

=== Academic career in Europe ===
She later moved to Belgrade, Yugoslavia (now Serbia), where she worked as a professor at the University of Novi Sad and University of Belgrade, serving as full professor at the latter from 1989 until 1996. She also started the mycological laboratory of the Institute for Biological Research "Siniša Stanković" and worked there as their scientific advisor. In 1983, she went to the University of Baghdad as a visiting professor during the Ba'athist Iraq era. Due to the Yugoslav Wars, her research access to foreign funding was restricted and she received her salary and retirement pension in checks of varying cashability. Xavier Llimona said that she was apparently the only mycologist to be a professor of mycology, noting that other mycologists would instead have botany, dermatology, microbiology, or phytopathology in their professor titles if working in Spain.

She became one of Yugoslavia's first microfungi experts and was later described by Jelena Vukojević as the "doyen of Yugoslav and Serbian mycology". She also specialized in phytopathology, with her contributions to the latter field including improvements to public nutrition with her studies on the prevalence and prevention of fungal crop diseases. She had published over seventy academic articles and described eight species of ascomycetes. (Note: Specifically: Phaeoramularia gomphrenicola (1960), Aspergillus aureolatus (1964), Penicillium jugoslavicum (1964), Aspergillus protuberus (1968), Embellisia didymospora (1976), Diaporthe helianthi (1981), Penicillium aureocephalum, and Arborillus llimonae (1998).) In the 1980s, she wrote the mycology textbook Opšta mikologija, which achieved widespread usage in Serbia and was also the first Serbian-language "comprehensive presentation of the fungi kingdom", before later being translated to Spanish and Catalan. She also became an honorary member of the Spanish Association of Mycology in 1988, as well as the first president of the Mycological Society of Serbia.

=== Personal life ===
Her first husband was Francisco de Asis Monrós, an entomologist who was a fellow UNT academic. After her husband's death in 1958, she married Slobodan Cvetković, an engineer from Serbia whom she met while studying in France. Her children were translator Silvia Monrós-Stojakovic and pulmonologist Alexàndar Monrós.

She also learned to speak Serbo-Croatian while she was in Belgrade, describing herself as "the universal Serbo-Catalan". However, she still kept a Spanish passport even after she moved to Serbia, and she often did academic work in her native Catalonia, with examples including her lectures in fungal phytopathology and her research on fungi in local boxwood.

She died on 7 January 2011 in Belgrade, aged 87.

== Bibliography ==
- Muntañola-Cvetković, Maria (1987). Opšta mikologija (in Serbian). Belgrade: Književne novine.
- Muntañola-Cvetković, Maria (1990). Opšta mikologija (in Serbian). Belgrade: Naučna knjiga.
