= Anglade (surname) =

Anglade is a French surname. Notable people with the surname include:

- Dominique Anglade (born 1974), Canadian engineer, businesswoman and former politician
- France Anglade (1942–2014), French film actress
- Francois Anglade (1758–1834), French priest and academic
- Gaston Anglade (1854–1919), French impressionist painter
- Georges Anglade (1944–2010), Haitian-Canadian geographer, professor, writer and politician
- Henri Vincent-Anglade (1876–1956), French portrait painter and advertising illustrator
- Henry Anglade (1933–2022), French cyclist
- Jean-Hugues Anglade (born 1955), French actor, film director, and screenwriter
- Joseph Anglade (1868–1930), French philologist
- Magdeleine Anglade (1921–1998), French politician and company director
- Michel Anglade (1946–2025), French rugby union and league player
- Pieyre-Alexandre Anglade (born 1986), French politician

== See also ==
- Anglada (surname), a Catalan surname
