= Juan Manuel Sanabria =

Uruguayan footballer (born 2000)

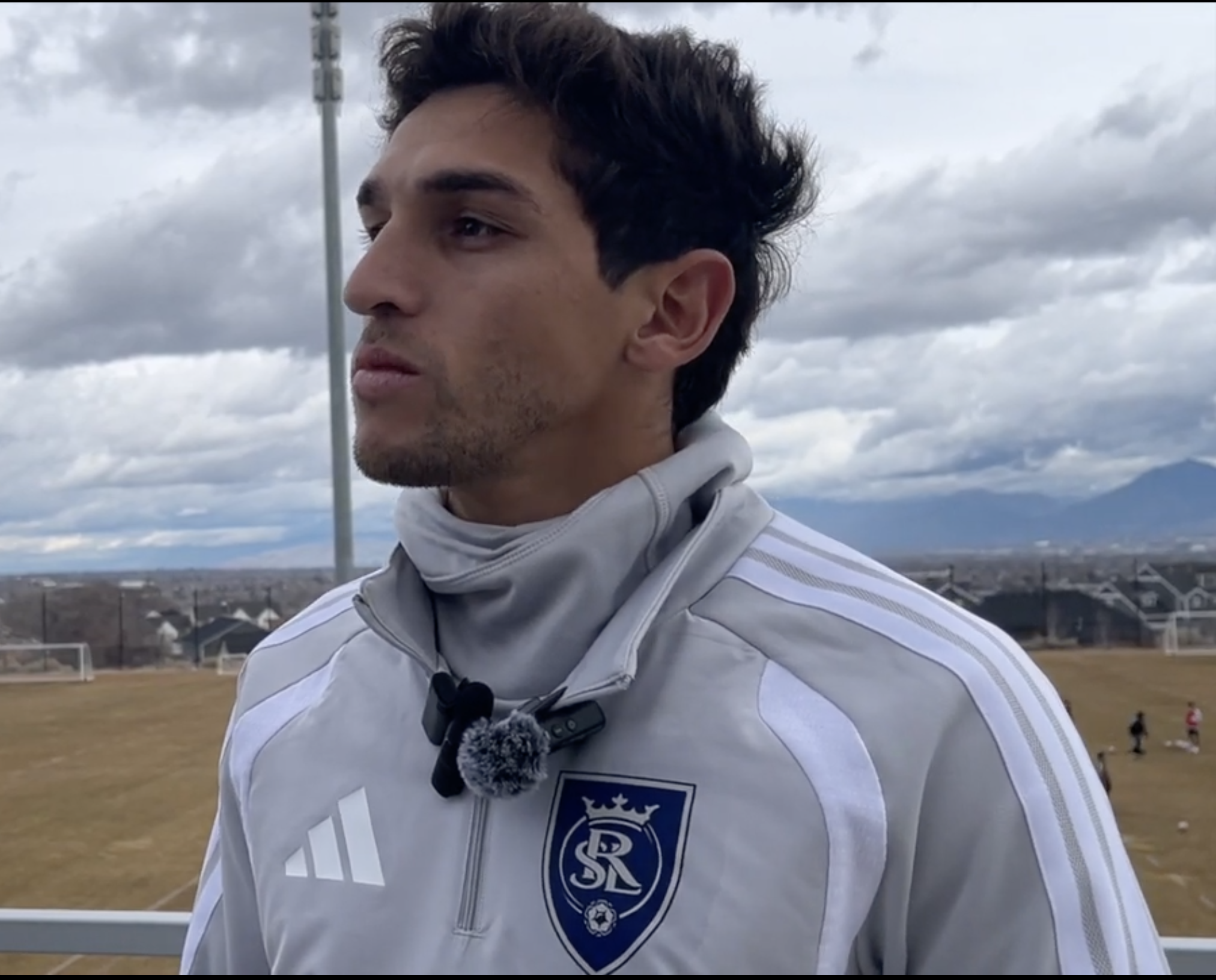
- Sanabria in 2026

Personal information
- Full name: Juan Manuel Sanabria Magole
- Date of birth: 29 March 2000 (age 26)
- Place of birth: Florida, Uruguay
- Height: 1.72 m (5 ft 8 in)
- Positions: Midfielder; left-back

Team information
- Current team: Real Salt Lake
- Number: 8

Youth career
- Nacional Florida
- 2012–2018: Nacional
- 2018–2019: Atlético Madrid

Senior career*
Years	Team	Apps	(Gls)
2019–2021	Atlético Madrid B	31	(3)
2020–2023	Atlético Madrid	0	(0)
2021	→ Zaragoza (loan)	13	(1)
2021–2023	→ Atlético San Luis (loan)	69	(3)
2023–2026	Atlético San Luis	94	(5)
2026–	Real Salt Lake	11	(0)

International career^{‡}
2014–2015	Uruguay U15	24	(0)
2016–2017	Uruguay U17	24	(1)
2017	Uruguay U18	9	(2)
2018–2019	Uruguay U20	23	(1)
2020	Uruguay U23	8	(1)
2025–	Uruguay	11	(2)
Medal record
Men's football
Representing Uruguay
South American Games
Silver medal – second place	2018 Cochabamba	Team
- * Club domestic league appearances and goals as of 23 May 2026 ‡ National team caps and goals as of 18 November 2026

Juan Manuel Sanabria Magole (born 29 March 2000) is a Uruguayan professional footballer who plays as a midfielder or left-back for Major League Soccer club Real Salt Lake and the Uruguay national team.

== Club career ==
Sanabria was born in Florida, and joined Nacional's youth setup in 2012 from hometown side Club Nacional de Florida. In January 2017, Atlético Madrid reached an agreement with Nacional for the transfer of Sanabria, with the player joining his new club after his 18th birthday. He officially joined Atleti on 23 July 2018, being assigned to the Juvenil A squad.

Promoted to the reserves for the 2019–20 campaign, Sanabria made his senior debut on 24 August 2019, starting in a 2–1 Segunda División B away win against Marino de Luanco. His first senior goal came on 7 September, as he scored the winner in a 2–1 success at UP Langreo.

Sanabria made his first team debut for Atleti on 16 December 2020, coming on as a late substitute for Ángel Correa in a 3–0 away win against CD Cardassar, for the season's Copa del Rey. The following 26 January, he was loaned to Segunda División side Real Zaragoza for the remainder of the campaign.

Sanabria made his professional debut on 12 February 2021, replacing Sergio Bermejo in a 1–1 away draw against CE Sabadell FC.

On 10 February 2026, Sanabria joined Major League Soccer side Real Salt Lake until the end of their 2029-30 season.

== International career ==
Sanabria has represented Uruguay at various youth levels. With 88 caps for youth national teams, he has represented Uruguay at the 2015 South American U-15 Championship, 2017 South American U-17 Championship, 2019 South American U-20 Championship, 2019 FIFA U-20 World Cup and the 2020 CONMEBOL Pre-Olympic Tournament.

In June 2025, Sanabria received his first call-up to the Uruguay national team. He made his debut on 10 October 2025 in a 1–0 friendly win against the Dominican Republic. He scored his first goal three days later, on 13 October, in a 2–1 win over Uzbekistan. On 31 May 2026, he was named in Uruguay's 26-man squad for the 2026 FIFA World Cup.

== Personal life ==
Sanabria is the elder brother of footballer Lucas Sanabria.

== Career statistics ==
=== Club ===
As of 12 February 2021

Appearances and goals by club, season and competition
Club	Season	League			Cup		Continental		Other		Total	
Club	Season	Division	Apps	Goals	Apps	Goals	Apps	Goals	Apps	Goals	Apps	Goals
Atlético Madrid B	2019–20	Segunda División B	22	3	—		—		1 (Note: Appearance in promotion play-offs.)	0	23	3
Atlético Madrid B	2020–21	Segunda División B	9	0	—		—		—		9	0
Atlético Madrid B	Total		31	3	0	0	0	0	1	0	32	3
Atlético Madrid	2020–21	La Liga	0	0	1	0	0	0	—		1	0
Zaragoza (loan)	2020–21	Segunda División	13	1	0	0	—		—		13	1
Atlético San Luis	2021–22	Liga MX	30	1	—		—		1	0	31	1
Atlético San Luis	2022–23	Liga MX	25	1	—		—		0	0	25	1
Atlético San Luis	Total		55	2	—		—		1	0	56	2
Career total			99	6	1	0	0	0	2	0	102	6

=== International ===
As of match played 17 November 2026

Appearances and goals by national team and year
National team	Year	Apps	Goals
Uruguay	2025	3	1
Uruguay	2026	8	1
Total		11	2

Scores and results list Uruguay's goal tally first, score column indicates score after each Sanabria goal.

List of international goals scored by Juan Manuel Sanabria
No.	Date	Venue	Opponent	Score	Result	Competition
1	13 October 2025	Hang Jebat Stadium, Malacca City, Malaysia	Uzbekistan	2–0	2–1	Friendly
2	6 October 2026	Salt Lake Stadium, Kolkata, India	India	5–1	6–1	Friendly

== Honours ==
Nacional U20

- U-20 Copa Libertadores: 2018

Uruguay U20

- South American Games silver medal: 2018

Individual

- Liga MX All-Star: 2024
