= Jorge Pombo =

Spanish footballer (born 1994)

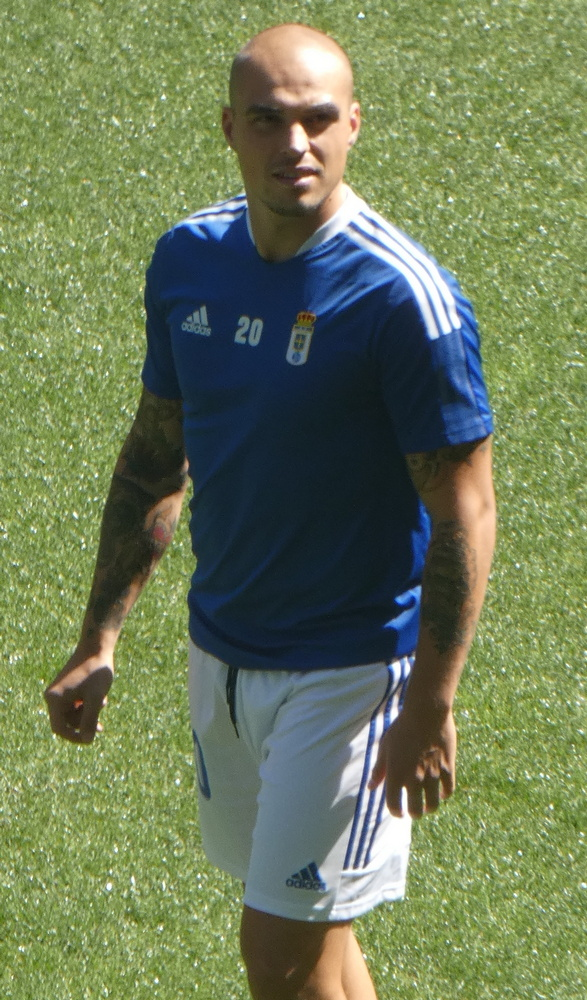

Personal information
- Full name: Jorge Marcos Pombo Escobar
- Date of birth: 22 February 1994 (age 32)
- Place of birth: Zaragoza, Spain
- Height: 1.75 m (5 ft 9 in)
- Position: Attacking midfielder

Team information
- Current team: A.E. Kifisia
- Number: 6

Youth career
- Zaragoza
- Amistad
- 2012–2013: Zaragoza

Senior career*
Years	Team	Apps	(Gls)
2013–2017	Zaragoza B	91	(19)
2016–2020	Zaragoza	97	(11)
2020	→ Cádiz (loan)	12	(0)
2020–2022	Cádiz	12	(1)
2021–2022	→ Oviedo (loan)	23	(1)
2022–2024	Racing Santander	33	(4)
2024	Andorra	13	(0)
2024–	A.E. Kifisia	65	(21)
- * Club domestic league appearances and goals as of 25 October 2026

Jorge Marcos Pombo Escobar (born 22 February 1994) is a Spanish professional footballer who plays as an attacking midfielder for Super League Greece club A.E. Kifisia.

== Club career ==
Born in Zaragoza, Pombo played youth football with local clubs Real Zaragoza and UD Amistad. He made his senior debut with the former's reserves on 6 October 2013, coming on as a substitute in a 2–0 Tercera División away win against CD Oliver.

On 17 May 2015, Pombo suffered a serious knee injury during a 2–8 Segunda División B heavy loss against Valencia CF Mestalla, being sidelined for seven months. After recovering, he continued to appear with the B-team regularly.

Pombo made his professional debut on 7 September 2016, starting in a 1–2 home loss against Real Valladolid, for the season's Copa del Rey. Thirteen days later he made his Segunda División debut, coming on as a substitute for Álex Barrera in a 0–0 away draw against Gimnàstic de Tarragona.

Pombo scored his first professional goal on 26 March 2017, netting the second in a 3–0 away win against Elche CF. On 5 April he renewed his contract until 2020, and after becoming a regular starter under César Láinez, he was definitely promoted to the main squad on 6 June.

On 2 January 2020, Pombo moved to fellow second division side Cádiz CF on loan for the remainder of the campaign. On 22 July, after achieving promotion, the club exercised the obligatory buyout clause and signed him permanently until 2023.

Pombo made his La Liga debut on 12 September 2020, starting in a 0–2 home loss against CA Osasuna. He scored his first goal in the category eight days later, netting his team's last in a 2–0 win at SD Huesca.

On 31 August 2021, Pombo moved to Real Oviedo in the second division, on a one-year loan deal. Upon returning, he terminated his contract with Cádiz on 1 September 2022, and signed a two-year deal with Racing de Santander just hours later.

On 1 February 2024, Pombo left Racing and signed a short-term deal with fellow second division side FC Andorra.

On 23 September 2024, Pombo signed with A.E. Kifisia in the Greek second tier.

== Career statistics ==
=== Club ===
As of match played 14 December 2020

Appearances and goals by club, season and competition
Club	Season	League			National Cup		Other		Total	
Club	Season	Division	Apps	Goals	Apps	Goals	Apps	Goals	Apps	Goals
Zaragoza	2014–15	Segunda División	0	0	0	0	—		0	0
Zaragoza	2015–16	Segunda División	16	2	1	0	—		17	2
Zaragoza	2016–17	Segunda División	32	5	4	2	—		36	7
Zaragoza	2017–18	Segunda División	39	4	2	1	2 (Note: Appearance(s) in Promotion Playoffs)	0	43	5
Zaragoza	2018–19	Segunda División	10	0	1	0	—		11	0
Zaragoza	Total		97	11	8	1	2	0	107	12
Cádiz (loan)	2019–20	Segunda División	12	0	0	0	—		12	0
Cádiz	2020–21	La Liga	7	1	0	0	—		7	1
Cádiz	Total		19	1	0	0	0	0	19	1
Career total			116	12	8	1	2	0	126	13
