= Alberto Zapater =

Spanish footballer

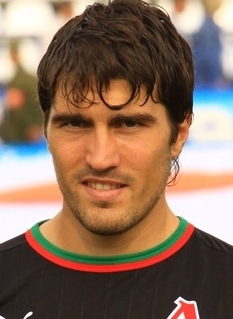
- Zapater with Lokomotiv Moscow in 2012

Personal information
- Full name: Alberto Zapater Arjol
- Date of birth: 13 June 1985 (age 41)
- Place of birth: Ejea de los Caballeros, Spain
- Height: 1.80 m (5 ft 11 in)
- Position: Defensive midfielder

Youth career
- Ejea
- 1997–2004: Zaragoza

Senior career*
Years	Team	Apps	(Gls)
2004–2009	Zaragoza	177	(5)
2009–2010	Genoa	28	(3)
2010–2011	Sporting CP	22	(2)
2011–2015	Lokomotiv Moscow	27	(1)
2016–2023	Zaragoza	203	(5)
2023–2025	Atlético Ottawa	62	(3)
Total		519	(19)

International career
2005	Spain U20	5	(1)
2004–2006	Spain U21	14	(0)
- * Club domestic league appearances and goals

Alberto Zapater Arjol (born 13 June 1985) is a Spanish former professional footballer who plays mainly as a defensive midfielder.

He spent most of his career with Zaragoza, appearing in 422 official games and scoring 12 goals.

== Club career ==
=== Zaragoza ===
Zapater was born in Ejea de los Caballeros, Province of Zaragoza. He joined his hometown side Real Zaragoza's academy at the age of 12.

The first-team manager, former Spanish international Víctor Muñoz, was impressed enough, allowing Zapater to join them for preseason training. He was given his official debut on Zaragoza's first game of 2004–05, against Valencia CF in the Supercopa de España: although the Aragonese ended up losing 1–0 he put up a solid performance overall, confirmed in the 3–1 second leg away win.

At just 19, Zapater went on to feature in 31 La Liga matches, netting in a 2 March 2005 defeat at Real Sociedad where he was also sent off. In the following campaign, he helped the club to finish as runners-up in the Copa del Rey (losing the final to RCD Espanyol) while also only missing three league matches; his strong tackling and the amount of fouls he committed earned him the nickname of 'The Bull', given by Diego Maradona.

In the next two seasons, after renewing his contract until June 2010, Zapater remained an undisputed starter, only missing four games while experiencing qualification for the UEFA Cup in 2006–07, and relegation the following year.

=== Abroad ===
In late July 2009, after being instrumental in Zaragoza's return to the top division, and already playing pre-season football with the Maños, Zapater left for Genoa CFC for around €4.5 million, as the Spaniards were also immerse in a deep financial crisis. He held an emotional press conference before parting ways with his boyhood team, whilst fans paid tribute to the player dedicating a song to him.

On 17 September 2009, Zapater had the distinction of scoring the first ever goal in the Europa League proper, with a fourth-minute strike against SK Slavia Prague. He started throughout most of his debut season in Serie A – his maiden appearance in the competition being marked with a goal and an assist in a 3–2 home win over AS Roma– as Genoa finished in mid-table. Before the end of the campaign and during the subsequent off-season he was linked with a move to several clubs, but nothing ever materialised.

Zapater was sold to Sporting CP on 30 July 2010, as Miguel Veloso moved in the opposite direction. Used intermittently in his only season he did appear in 34 official games for the Lions, scoring four times.

On 3 August 2011, Zapater moved to FC Lokomotiv Moscow on a free transfer, signing a five-year contract. He made his first Russian Premier League appearance on 11 September, setting up Manuel da Costa's goal in a 4–2 win over FC Zenit Saint Petersburg. In an interview with Zaragoza-based newspaper El Periódico de Aragón in late 2012, he spoke of his development in the new reality and his efforts to learn the Russian language.

=== Return to Zaragoza ===
On 19 June 2016, Zapater returned to Zaragoza after agreeing to a two-year deal. New manager Natxo González deployed him further up the field, and he responded by scoring five goals in the 2017–18 season, once in the promotion playoffs against CD Numancia; he would only find the net again four years later.

Zapater left the La Romareda in May 2023 after seven years in the Segunda División, aged 38. At the time of his departure, he was the third player with the most appearances for the club at 422.

=== Atlético Ottawa ===
On 28 June 2023, Canadian Premier League club Atlético Ottawa signed Zapater for the remainder of the campaign, with an option to extend in 2024. He remained at the TD Place Stadium until the end of the 2025 season as co-captain, with the 40-year-old announcing shortly before its closure that he would be retiring.

Zapater featured 11 minutes of the Premier League final on 9 November 2025, a 2–1 extra-time victory against Cavalry FC.

== International career ==
Zapater took part in the 2005 FIFA World Youth Championship, in a Spanish team that also featured future senior internationals Cesc Fàbregas, Fernando Llorente and David Silva. He scored his first and the only goal in a 3–1 defeat to Argentina in the quarter-finals.

After that, Zapater immediately established himself as an under-21 regular.

== Career statistics ==
Appearances and goals by club, season and competition
Club	Season	League			National cup		League cup		Continental		Other		Total	
Club	Season	Division	Apps	Goals	Apps	Goals	Apps	Goals	Apps	Goals	Apps	Goals	Apps	Goals
Zaragoza	2004–05	La Liga	31	1	1	1	—		8	0	2 (Note: Appearances in Supercopa de España)	0	42	2
Zaragoza	2005–06	La Liga	35	0	9	0	—		—		—		44	0
Zaragoza	2006–07	La Liga	36	0	3	0	—		—		—		39	0
Zaragoza	2007–08	La Liga	36	2	4	0	—		2	0	—		42	2
Zaragoza	2008–09	Segunda División	39	2	1	0	—		—		—		40	2
Zaragoza	Total		177	5	18	1	—		10	0	2	0	207	6
Genoa	2009–10	Serie A	28	3	1	0	—		7	1	—		36	4
Sporting CP	2010–11	Primeira Liga	22	2	1	0	3	2	8	0	—		34	4
Lokomotiv Moscow	2011–12	Russian Premier League	21	1	2	0	—		9	0	—		32	1
Lokomotiv Moscow	2012–13	Russian Premier League	5	0	0	0	—		—		—		5	0
Lokomotiv Moscow	2013–14	Russian Premier League	1	0	0	0	—		—		—		1	0
Lokomotiv Moscow	2014–15	Russian Premier League	0	0	0	0	—		0	0	—		0	0
Lokomotiv Moscow	2015–16	Russian Premier League	0	0	0	0	—		0	0	0	0	0	0
Lokomotiv Moscow	Total		27	1	2	0	—		9	0	0	0	38	1
Zaragoza	2016–17	Segunda División	42	0	0	0	—		—		—		42	0
Zaragoza	2017–18	Segunda División	39	4	3	0	—		—		2 (Note: Appearances in La Liga play-offs)	1	44	5
Zaragoza	2018–19	Segunda División	26	0	0	0	—		—		—		26	0
Zaragoza	2019–20	Segunda División	7	0	0	0	—		—		1	0	8	0
Zaragoza	2020–21	Segunda División	29	0	2	0	—		—		—		31	0
Zaragoza	2021–22	Segunda División	31	0	3	0	—		—		—		34	0
Zaragoza	2022–23	Segunda División	29	1	1	0	—		—		—		30	1
Zaragoza	Total		203	5	9	0	—		—		3	1	215	6
Atlético Ottawa	2023	Canadian Premier League	16	0	0	0	—		—		—		16	0
Atlético Ottawa	2024	Canadian Premier League	23	3	3	2	—		—		1	0	27	5
Atlético Ottawa	2025	Canadian Premier League	23	0	5	0	—		—		1	0	29	0
Atlético Ottawa	Total		62	3	8	2	—		0	0	2	0	72	5
Career total			519	19	39	3	3	2	34	1	7	1	602	27

== Honours ==
Zaragoza

- Supercopa de España: 2004
- Copa del Rey runner-up: 2005–06

Atlético Ottawa

- Canadian Premier League: 2025
