= Luis Carbonell =

Spanish footballer

Personal information
- Full name: Luis Carbonell Artajona
- Date of birth: 27 April 2003 (age 23)
- Place of birth: Zaragoza, Spain
- Height: 1.69 m (5 ft 7 in)
- Position: Forward

Youth career
- 2013–2022: Zaragoza
- 2021–2022: → Real Madrid (loan)

Senior career*
Years	Team	Apps	(Gls)
2020–2026	Zaragoza B	15	(2)
2020	Zaragoza	2	(0)
2022–2023	→ Teruel (loan)	27	(2)
2023–2024	→ Tudelano (loan)	14	(2)
2024–2025	→ Ejea (loan)	13	(0)

International career
2020	Spain U17	1	(1)
2021	Spain U19	2	(0)
- * Club domestic league appearances and goals as of 23 May 2026

Luis Carbonell Artajona (born 27 April 2003) is a Spanish footballer who plays as a forward.

== Club career ==
Born in Zaragoza, Aragon, Carbonell was a Real Zaragoza youth graduate. In 2018, he agreed to a professional contract with the club until 2023.

Carbonell made his senior debut with the reserves at the age of 17 on 18 July 2020, coming on as a second-half substitute for Marcos Baselga in a 0–1 Tercera División away loss against SD Tarazona, in the promotion play-offs. He scored his first senior goal on 18 October, netting the equalizer in a 1–1 away draw against CF Illueca.

Carbonell made his first team debut on 9 December 2020, replacing Pep Chavarría late into a 0–1 loss at UD Almería in the Segunda División. The following 31 August, he was loaned to Real Madrid and returned to the youth setup.

On 21 August 2022, Carbonell moved to Segunda Federación side CD Teruel on loan for one year. On 14 July of the following year, he moved to fellow league team CD Tudelano also in a temporary deal.

On 2 February 2024, Carbonell's loan with Tudelano was terminated, and he moved to Tercera Federación side SD Ejea also in a temporary deal. On 22 July, after helping the club in their promotion to the fourth division, his loan was extended for a further year.
