= Aspergillus aureolatus =

Scientific classification
- Kingdom: Fungi
- Division: Ascomycota
- Class: Eurotiomycetes
- Order: Eurotiales
- Family: Aspergillaceae
- Genus: Aspergillus
- Species: A. aureolatus

Binomial name
- Aspergillus aureolatus Muntañola-Cvetkovic & Bata (1964)

Species of fungus

Aspergillus aureolatus is a species of fungus in the genus Aspergillus. It is from the Nidulantes section. The species was first described in 1964. It was isolated from air in Belgrade, Serbia.

== Growth and morphology ==
A. aureolatus has been cultivated on Czapek yeast extract agar (CYA) plates and Malt Extract Agar Oxoid® (MEAOX) plates. The growth morphology of the colonies can be seen in the pictures below.

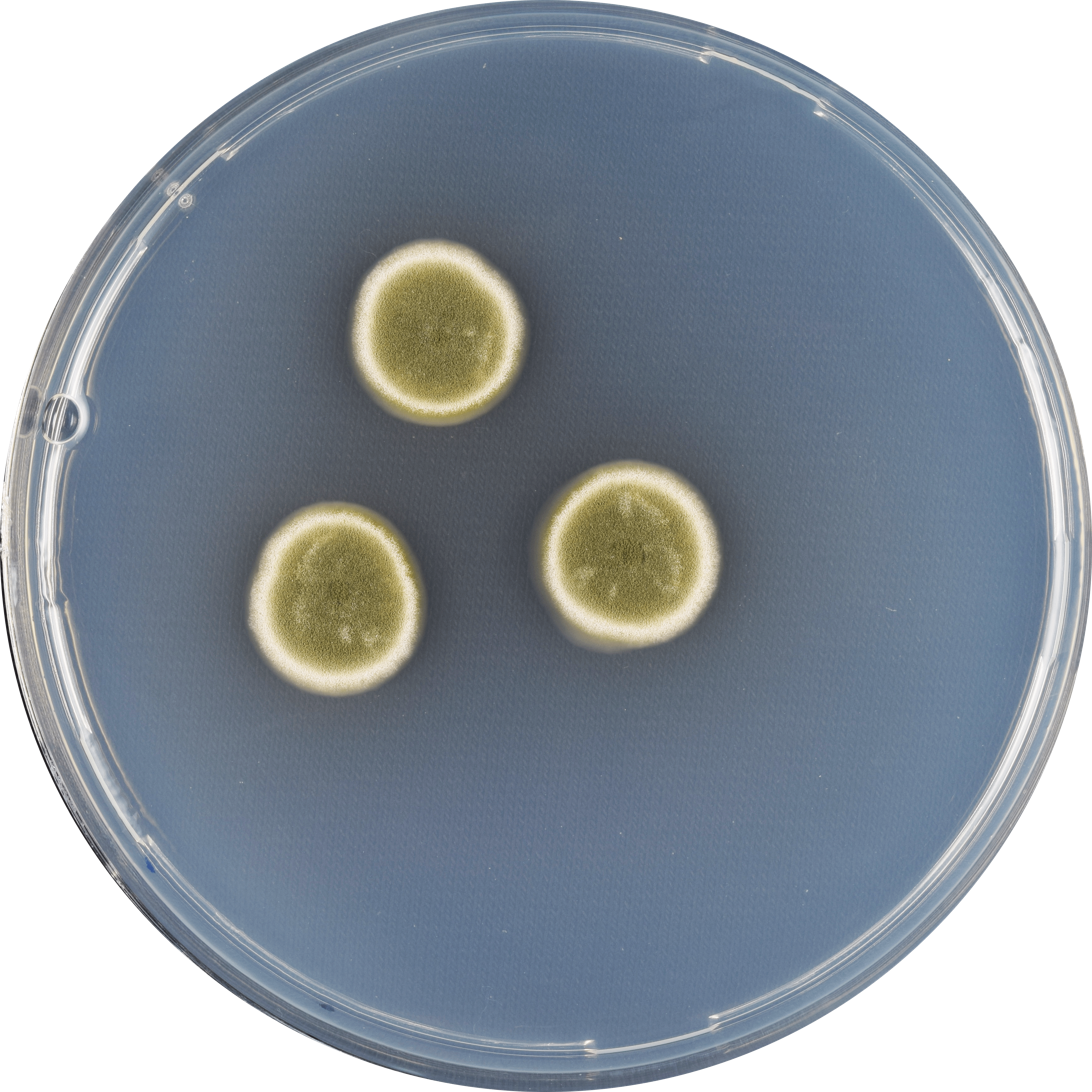
Aspergillus aureolatus growing on CYA plate

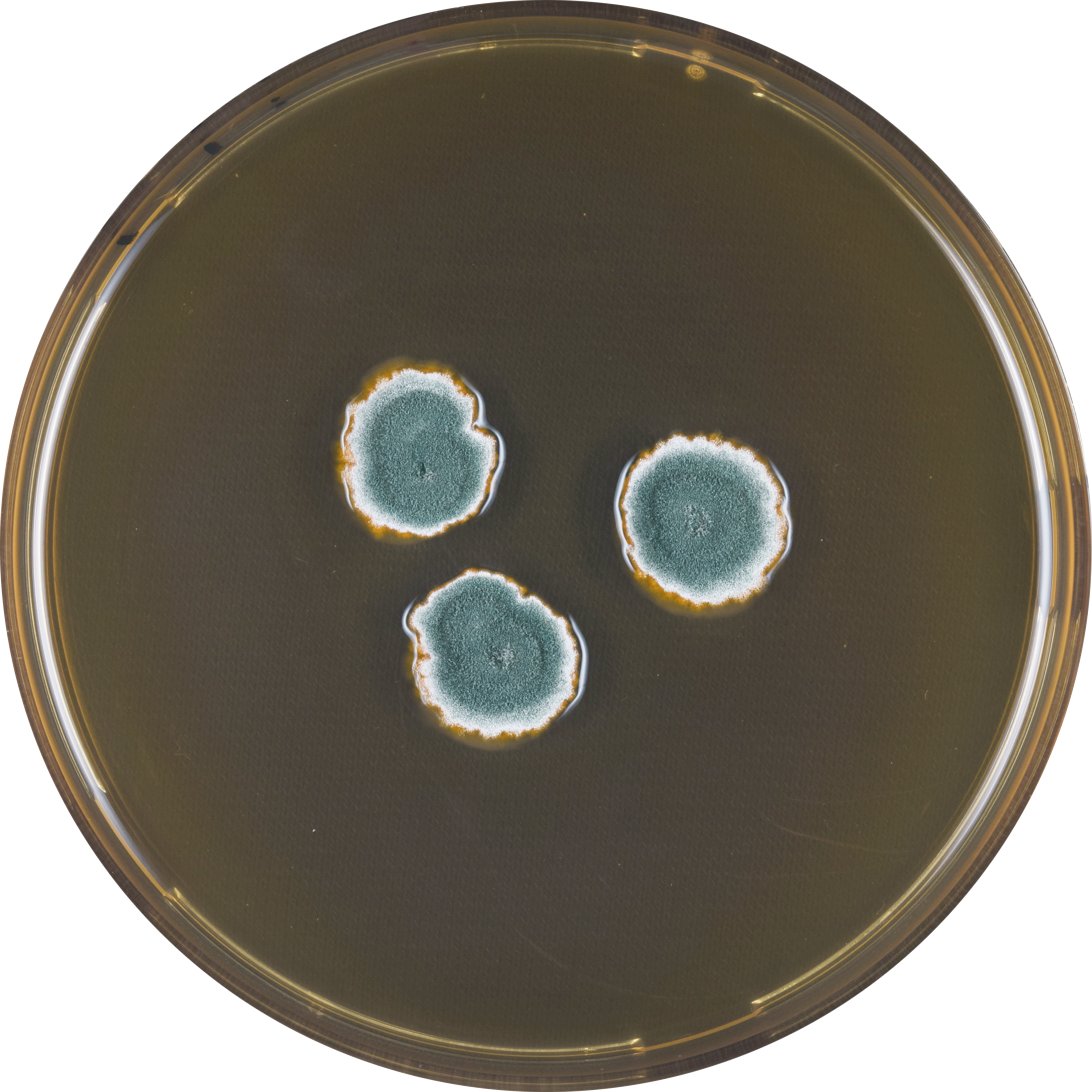
Aspergillus aureolatus growing on MEAOX plate
