= Julián Delmás =

Spanish footballer

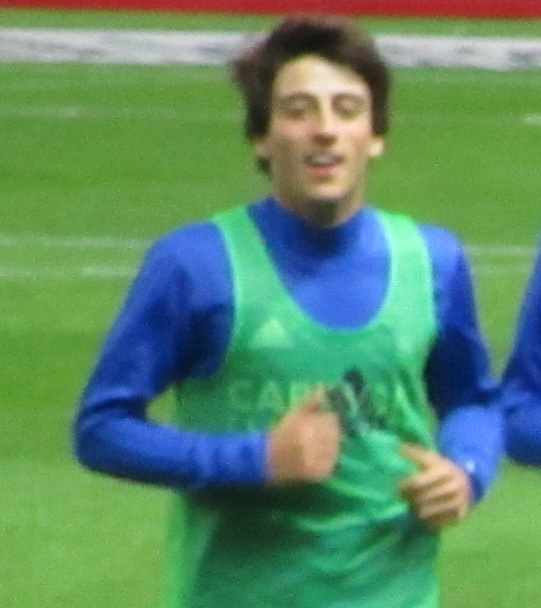
- Delmás with Zaragoza

Personal information
- Full name: Julián Javier Delmás Germán
- Date of birth: 20 April 1995 (age 31)
- Place of birth: Zaragoza, Spain
- Height: 1.73 m (5 ft 8 in)
- Position: Right back

Team information
- Current team: IMT

Youth career
- 2010–2014: Zaragoza

Senior career*
Years	Team	Apps	(Gls)
2014–2017	Zaragoza B	48	(3)
2014–2015	→ Villanueva (loan)	33	(1)
2017–2020	Zaragoza	64	(2)
2020–2022	Cartagena	69	(4)
2023	Málaga	17	(0)
2023–2025	Racing Ferrol	36	(0)
2025	Cartagena	15	(0)
2026	Tarazona	17	(3)
2026–	IMT	1	(0)
- * Club domestic league appearances and goals as of 18 August 2026

Julián Javier Delmás Germán (born 20 April 1995) is a Spanish professional footballer who plays as a right back for Serbian club IMT.

== Club career ==
Delmás played youth football with Real Zaragoza. In 2014 he was loaned to Tercera División side Villanueva CF, making his senior debut with the club during the season.

Delmás returned to Zaragoza in July 2015, being assigned to the reserves also in the fourth level. On 6 June 2017, he renewed his contract until 2021 and was definitely promoted to the main squad ahead of the 2017–18 season.

Delmás made his professional debut on 18 August 2017, starting in a 0–1 away loss against CD Tenerife in the Segunda División. He scored his first professional goal on 3 December, netting the game's only in an away success over Sporting de Gijón.

On 19 September 2019, Delmás renewed his contract until 2023. The following 31 August, however, he signed a three-year deal with second division newcomers FC Cartagena.

On 22 December 2022, Delmás terminated his contract with the Efesé, and moved to fellow second division side Málaga CF two days later, on a 18-month deal. On 30 June 2023, however, after the latter's relegation, he left after activating an exit clause on his contract.

On 19 July 2023, Delmás signed for Racing de Ferrol, newly-promoted to division two. On 14 January 2025, he terminated his link with the club, and returned to Cartagena on a short-term deal just hours later.
