= Penicillium aureocephalum =

Scientific classification
- Domain: Eukaryota
- Kingdom: Fungi
- Division: Ascomycota
- Class: Eurotiomycetes
- Order: Eurotiales
- Family: Aspergillaceae
- Genus: Penicillium
- Species: P. aureocephalum

Binomial name
- Penicillium aureocephalum Munt.-Cvetk., Hoyo & Gomez-Bolea 2001

Type strain
- CBS 102801

Species of fungus

Penicillium aureocephalum is a fungus species of the genus of Penicillium which was isolated in Catalonia in Spain on leaves from Quercus suber and Cistus salviifolius.

== See also ==
- List of Penicillium species
