= Alain Oyarzun =

Spanish footballer

Personal information
- Full name: Alain Oyarzun Aguilar
- Date of birth: 27 September 1993 (age 33)
- Place of birth: San Sebastián, Spain
- Height: 1.83 m (6 ft 0 in)
- Position: Winger

Team information
- Current team: Kanchanaburi Power
- Number: 19

Youth career
- Les Eglantins
- 2005–2012: Real Sociedad

Senior career*
Years	Team	Apps	(Gls)
2012–2015	Real Sociedad B	75	(16)
2014–2017	Real Sociedad	0	(0)
2016–2017	→ Mirandés (loan)	20	(1)
2017–2018	Zaragoza	17	(0)
2018–2020	Numancia	30	(3)
2020–2021	Córdoba	9	(0)
2021–2024	Real Unión	96	(8)
2024–2025	Rajasthan United	20	(8)
2025–2026	Kanchanaburi Power	26	(1)
- * Club domestic league appearances and goals as of 3 August 2025

Alain Oyarzun Aguilar (born 27 September 1993) is a Spanish professional footballer who plays as a left winger for Thai League 1 club Kanchanaburi Power.

== Club career ==
Born in San Sebastián, Gipuzkoa, Basque Country, Oyarzun joined Real Sociedad's youth system in 2005 at the age of 12, after starting out at AS Les Eglantins d'Hendaye, a French club based in Hendaye. On 18 June 2012 he signed his first professional contract, running until 2014, at the same time being promoted to the reserves.

Oyarzun made his debut as a senior in 2012–13, and went on to appear in several Segunda División B seasons. He was called up by the first team for a La Liga match against RCD Espanyol on 30 November 2013, but remained unused in the 2–1 away win.

Oyarzun extended his contract with the Txuri-urdin on 21 January 2014, signing until 2018. On 4 December he made his first-team debut, replacing fellow youth graduate David Zurutuza in a 0–0 away draw with Real Oviedo in the round of 32 of the Copa del Rey.

On 20 August 2015, Oyarzun was definitely promoted to the main squad and given the #12 jersey. On 25 January of the following year, after making no league appearances, he was loaned to CD Mirandés of Segunda División until June.

Oyarzun scored his first professional goal on 9 April 2016, the only one of the game in a home victory over SD Ponferradina. On 13 July, his loan was extended for a year.

On 6 July 2017, Oyarzun signed a permanent two-year deal with Real Zaragoza, with Real Sociedad having a buy-back clause. Roughly one year later, he agreed to a two-year contract with fellow second division side CD Numancia.
