= Jesús Valentín =

Spanish footballer

Personal information
- Full name: Jesús Miguel Valentín Rodríguez
- Date of birth: 15 October 1991 (age 35)
- Place of birth: Las Américas, Spain
- Height: 1.85 m (6 ft 1 in)
- Position: Centre-back

Youth career
- Tenerife

Senior career*
Years	Team	Apps	(Gls)
2010–2012	Ibarra	?	(12)
2012–2014	Las Palmas B	62	(4)
2014–2016	Las Palmas	3	(0)
2015–2016	→ Huesca (loan)	14	(1)
2016	Huesca	10	(0)
2017–2018	Zaragoza	20	(0)
2018–2019	Córdoba	19	(0)
2019	Recreativo	14	(0)
2019–2020	Rayo Majadahonda	22	(0)
2020–2021	Recreativo	18	(1)
2021–2023	Mensajero	8	(0)
- * Club domestic league appearances and goals as of 15:16, 28 January 2024 (UTC)

Jesús Miguel Valentín Rodríguez (born 15 October 1991), is a Spanish footballer who plays as a centre-back.

== Club career ==
Born in Las Américas, Santa Cruz de Tenerife, Canary Islands, Valentín started playing as a senior with local UD Ibarra. In 2012, he moved to UD Las Palmas, being assigned to the reserves in the Tercera División.

On 13 July 2014 Jesús signed a three-year professional deal, being definitely promoted to the main squad. He made his first-team debut on 11 September, starting in a 2–0 away win against RCD Mallorca, in the season's Copa del Rey.

Valentín made his league debut on 1 March 2015, starting in a 1–1 home draw against CD Tenerife in the Segunda División. On 25 August he was loaned to fellow league team SD Huesca, in a season-long deal.

Valentín scored his first professional goal on 13 March 2016, netting the game's only in a home success against AD Alcorcón. On 7 July, he rescinded his contract with Las Palmas and signed a permanent three-year deal with Huesca four days later.

On 3 January 2017, Valentín was transferred to fellow league team Real Zaragoza. On 31 January of the following year, he signed for Córdoba CF in the same division.

On 31 January 2019, Valentín terminated his contract with the Blanquiverdes, and moved to third division side Recreativo de Huelva just hours later. On 4 July, he signed for CF Rayo Majadahonda, freshly relegated to division three.
