= Xiscu Martínez =

Spanish footballer

Xiscu
Personal information
- Full name: Francisco Martínez Anglada
- Date of birth: 6 March 1995 (age 31)
- Place of birth: Ciutadella de Menorca, Spain
- Height: 1.70 m (5 ft 7 in)
- Position: Winger

Team information
- Current team: Don Benito
- Number: 19

Youth career
- 2011–2012: Penya Ciutadella
- 2012–2013: Menorca
- 2013–2014: Atlético Baleares

Senior career*
Years	Team	Apps	(Gls)
2014	Atlético Baleares	0	(0)
2014–2015	Mercadal	38	(15)
2015–2017	Zaragoza B	61	(19)
2016–2017	Zaragoza	7	(0)
2017–2018	Murcia	8	(1)
2018–2019	Villanovense	15	(0)
2019	Málaga B	6	(0)
2019–2020	Calamonte	22	(9)
2020–	Don Benito	2	(0)
- * Club domestic league appearances and goals as of 1 November 2020

Francisco Martínez Anglada (born 6 March 1995), commonly known as Xiscu, is a Spanish footballer who plays for CD Don Benito mainly as a left winger.

== Club career ==
Born in Ciutadella de Menorca, Balearic Islands, Xiscu represented CD Menorca and CD Atlético Baleares as a youth. On 9 June 2014 he joined Tercera División side CE Mercadal, scoring 15 goals during his debut campaign.

On 13 June 2015 Xiscu signed for Real Zaragoza, being assigned to the reserves also in the fourth level. On 13 November of the following year he made his professional debut, coming on as a late substitute for Juan Muñoz in a 2–0 home win against CD Mirandés in the Segunda División.

On 30 July 2017, Xiscu joined Real Murcia of the Segunda División B.
