= Marcos Baselga =

Spanish footballer (born 1999)

Personal information
- Full name: Marcos Baselga García
- Date of birth: 15 February 1999 (age 27)
- Place of birth: Zaragoza, Spain
- Height: 1.80 m (5 ft 11 in)
- Position: Forward

Team information
- Current team: UD Logroñés

Youth career
- 2013–2018: Zaragoza

Senior career*
Years	Team	Apps	(Gls)
2017–2020	Zaragoza B	38	(25)
2020–2024	Zaragoza	1	(0)
2020–2021	→ Atlético Baleares (loan)	19	(2)
2021–2022	→ Zamora (loan)	31	(5)
2022–2023	→ Calahorra (loan)	35	(12)
2023–2024	→ Sabadell (loan)	25	(5)
2024–2025	Arenteiro	28	(12)
2025–2026	Gimnàstic	31	(6)
2026–	UD Logroñés	11	(3)
- * Club domestic league appearances and goals as of 14 November 2026

Marcos Baselga García (born 15 February 1999) is a Spanish footballer who plays as a forward for UD Logroñés.

== Club career ==
Baselga was born in Zaragoza, Aragon, and was a Real Zaragoza youth graduate. He made his senior debut with the reserves on 27 August 2017, playing the last five minutes in a 1–1 Segunda División B away draw against Lleida Esportiu.

Baselga scored his first senior goal on 2 September 2018, scoring the second in a 4–0 home routing of CF Calamocha. Roughly one year later, he scored four times in a 6–0 thrashing of CD Binéfar.

On 14 May 2020, Baselga renewed his contract until 2024 and was definitely promoted to the first team for the 2020–21 season. He made his professional debut on 20 July, coming on as a late substitute for Jannick Buyla in a 2–1 home win against SD Ponferradina in the Segunda División.

On 25 September 2020, Baselga was loaned to CD Atlético Baleares of the third division for a year. The following 29 July, he was loaned to Zamora CF of the Primera División RFEF for a year.

On 14 July 2022, Baselga moved to fellow league team CD Calahorra also in a temporary deal. He scored 12 times for the side during the campaign, but was unable to avoid team relegation.

On 9 August 2023, Baselga renewed his contract with Zaragoza until 2025, and moved to CE Sabadell FC also in the third division on a season-long loan deal. Upon returning, he terminated his link with the Maños on 29 August 2024, and signed for CD Arenteiro two days later.

On 18 July 2025, Baselga joined fellow division three side Gimnàstic de Tarragona on a one-year contract.

On 28 July 2026, Baselga joined fellow Primera RFEF side UD Logroñés on a one-year contract.
