= Sergio Bermejo =

Spanish footballer

Personal information
- Full name: Sergio Bermejo Lillo
- Date of birth: 17 August 1997 (age 29)
- Place of birth: Madrid, Spain
- Height: 1.70 m (5 ft 7 in)
- Position: Attacking midfielder

Team information
- Current team: Gil Vicente
- Number: 17

Youth career
- Getafe

Senior career*
Years	Team	Apps	(Gls)
2015–2018	Getafe B	44	(4)
2017	→ Móstoles (loan)	12	(1)
2018	Navalcarnero	17	(4)
2018–2020	Celta B	42	(8)
2019	Celta	1	(0)
2020–2025	Zaragoza	134	(9)
2024	→ Elche (loan)	12	(0)
2025–	Gil Vicente	26	(1)
- * Club domestic league appearances and goals as of 25 May 2026

Sergio Bermejo Lillo (born 17 August 1997) is a Spanish professional footballer who plays for Portuguese club Gil Vicente. Mainly an attacking midfielder, he can also play as a winger.

== Club career ==
Bermejo was born in Madrid, and finished his formation with Getafe CF. He made his senior debut with the reserves on 1 May 2015, starting in a 0–1 Segunda División B home loss against SD Amorebieta.

On 15 January 2017, after being rarely used, Bermejo was loaned to fellow Tercera División side CD Móstoles URJC until June. Upon returning, he became an undisputed starter for the Azulones' B-team.

On 20 June 2018, Bermejo signed for CDA Navalcarnero in division three. On 18 December, however, he agreed to a four-year deal with RC Celta de Vigo and was assigned to the B-side also in the third tier.

Bermejo made his first team – and La Liga – debut on 30 October 2019, coming on as a late substitute for Denis Suárez in a 1–2 loss against Real Betis. The following 18 August, he signed a four-year contract with Real Zaragoza in Segunda División, after terminating his contract with Celta.

Bermejo scored his first professional goal on 8 January 2021, netting his team's second in a 2–0 home win over UD Logroñés. On 13 September 2022, after establishing himself as a regular starter, he renewed his contract until 2025.

On 1 February 2024, Bermejo was loaned to fellow second division side Elche CF until the end of the season. Upon returning, he featured sparingly before signing a two-and-a-half-year contract with Portuguese Primeira Liga side Gil Vicente FC on 24 January 2025.
